= Cellarius =

Cellarius may refer to:

== Surname ==
Cellarius is the Latin form of cellarer, an office within a medieval Benedictine abbey.

As a surname it is usually a Latinized form of the German name Keller. Notable people with the surname include:

- Andreas Cellarius, 1596–1665, German-Dutch mathematician and cartographer
- Christoph Cellarius, 1638–1707, Christoph Keller, Weimar, classical scholar
- Ludwig Cellarius, died 1526, Ludwig Keller of Basel, first husband of Wibrandis Rosenblatt
- Martin Cellarius, 1499–1564, Martin Borrhaus, anti-Trinitarian reformer
- Henri Cellarius, 1805- 1875, Henri Chrétien Cellarius, a French dance professor and theorist.

== Other ==
- 12618 Cellarius, a minor planet named after Andreas Cellarius
- Cellarius, a pseudonym used by Samuel Butler in his 1863 letter Darwin among the Machines
