= Caspar Hedio =

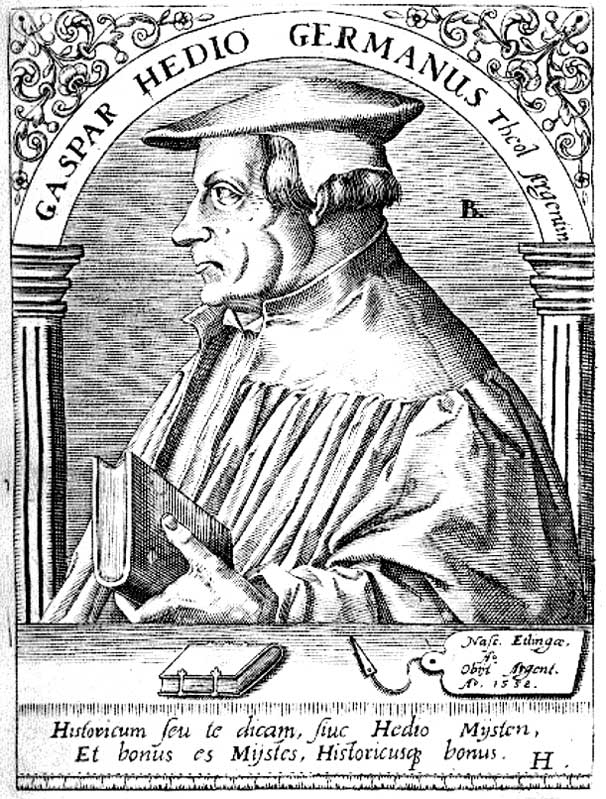

Caspar Hedio, also written as Kaspar Hedio, Kaspar Heyd, Kaspar Bock or Kaspar Böckel (Ettlingen, 1494 - Strasbourg, 17 October 1552) was an Alsatian historian, theologian and Protestant reformer.

He was born into a prosperous family and attended a famous school in Pforzheim. In 1513. he began his studies in Fribourg and later studied theology in Basel, where he received his degree in 1519. At that time, he began his relationship with Ulrich Zwingli and corresponded with Martin Luther. He took his doctorate in Mainz and obtained a position as a preacher at the Strasbourg Cathedral in 1523. His Protestant convictions were made clear when he married Margarete Trenz.

In Strasbourg, he collaborated with Wolfgang Capito and Martin Bucer and participated in the Marburg Colloquy. His influence extended to Alsace, the Margraviate of Baden and the Palatinate. When Philipp Melanchthon went to France, Hedio was asked to accompany him. In 1541, he moved to Regensburg to join Bucer and others in developing Protestant doctrine. As a representative of Strasbourg, he participated in the debate at the Diet of Worms of 1545.

Hedio translated many tracts by the Church Fathers, published a chronicle of the early Christian church based on the works of Eusebius and Sozomen and compiled a world history.

== Sources ==
- T. W. Röhrich: Mitteilungen aus der Geschichte der evangelischen Kirche des Elsasses. Band 3, 1855.
- W. Baum: Capito und Butzer. Elberfeld 1860.
- Ch. Spindler: Caspar Hedio 1864.
- Himmelheber: Caspar Hedio Karlsruhe 1881.
- C. Varrentrapp: Hermann von Wied und sein Reformationsversuch in Köln. Leipzig 1878.
- F. Roth: Friedrich II. von der Pfalz und die Reformation. Heidelberg 1904.
- J. Adam: Versuch einer Bibliographie Kasper Hedio's (ZGO N. F. 31 1916, 424–429).
- J. Adam: Evangelische Kirchengeschichte der Stadt Straßburg. 1922. 54ff. u. ö.
- J. Adam: Evangelische Kirchengeschichte der elsässischen Territorien. Straßburg 1928.
- W. Gunzert. Kleine Beiträge zur Geschichte der Grafschaft Hanau-Lichtenberg (Elsaß-lothr. Jb. 19, 1941, 129–141).
- H. Keute. Kaspar Hedio als Historiograf. Göttingen 1980
