= Stephan Agricola =

Lutheran church reformer

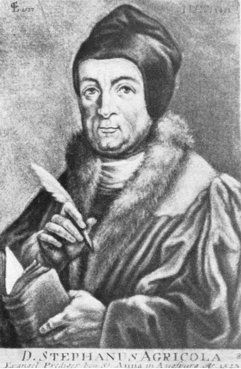
Stephan Agricola

Stephan Agricola (c. 1491 – 1547) was a Lutheran church reformer. Born in Abensberg, at a young age he joined the Augustinian order. As a monk, he studied Augustine deeply. As a student, he went to the universities in Bologna and Venice, where in 1519 he became a Doctor of Theology. He began to preach on whole books of the Bible in 1520. He was led to Lutheranism through his study of Augustine's works on the scriptures. He was accused of Lutheranism as a heresy. Although he claimed his independence of Luther, he was arrested and imprisoned in Mühldorf on November 17, 1522. In 1523 he escaped and came to Augsburg, where with Urbanus Rhegius he fully accepted the Reformation and translated Johannes Bugenhagen's tract ag. Zwingjli into German. He was on the Lutheran side during the Marburg Colloquy, became pastor in Hof in 1532, took part in the meeting at Schmalkalden in 1537, and signed the Smalcald Articles. He was instrumental in introducing the Reformation in the Upper Palatinate, as he was pastor at Sulzbach beginning in 1542. During the Schmalkaldic War, he had to flee to Eisleben, where he died in old age on April 10–11, 1547. Stephen Agricola was a staunch uncompromising Lutheran, earnest and devoted. His son, Stephen, translated some of Luther's commentaries on the minor prophets.

== Works ==
- Am köstlicher guther Sermon vom Sterben, Mühldorf 1523;
- Artickel wider Dr. Stephan Castenpaur eingelegt, auch was er darauf geantwortet hat aus seinem Gefängnuss, o. O. 1523;
- Ein Bedencken, wie der wahrhafftig Gottesdienst von Gott selbs geboten …, o. O. um 1524.
