= Tetrapolitan Confession =

Early Protestant confession of faith drawn up by Martin Bucer and Wolfgang Capito

The Tetrapolitan Confession (Latin: Confessio Tetrapolitana, German: Vierstädtebekenntnis), also called the Strasbourg Confession or Swabian Confession, was an early Protestant confession of faith drawn up by Martin Bucer and Wolfgang Capito and presented to the Emperor Charles V at the Diet of Augsburg on 9 July 1530 on behalf of the four south German cities of Konstanz, Lindau, Memmingen and Strasbourg. (The name "Tetrapolitan" means "of the four cities".) The confession was based on an early draft of the Augsburg Confession to which Bucer and Capito had secretly obtained access, but amended in the direction of Zwinglianism. Its purpose was to prevent a schism within Protestantism. It is the oldest confession of the Reformed tradition produced in Germany.

Bucer and Capito were called to the Diet of Augsburg by the envoys of Strasbourg, who were aware that Philipp Melanchthon was working on a Saxon Confession that would represent the Lutheran position. The north Germans (Lutherans) and the south Germans and Swiss had been divided in opinion since 1524 on the subject of the Lord's Supper, with the Lutherans supporting sacramental union (the physical presence of Christ's body in the sacrament) and the Zwinglians memorialism (the sacrament as a spiritual memorial only). This division had reached its high point in the Marburg Colloquy between Zwingli and Luther in 1529.

The original version of the confession contained the claim, probably authored by Capito, that "Christ the Lord is truly in the Supper and gives his true body truly to eat and his blood truly to drink, but especially to the spirit, through faith". The last clause was meant to express a Zwinglian emphasis on the spiritual nature of the sacrament. Even this was offensive to the Lutherans and at the insistence of Jakob Sturm and Matthis Pfarrer, the Strasbourg envoys, was watered down further.

The confession consists of 23 chapters. The first chapter states that nothing should be taught except that which is explicitly stated in Scripture, a statement that is not found in the Augsburg Confession.

For political reasons, the confession was abandoned in practice within a year of its adoption, when the four cities joined the Schmalkaldic League. In 1536, the theologians of Strasbourg signed the Wittenberg Concord that brought the Lutheran and Reformed churches into alignment. Formally, the Tetrapolitan Confession remained the confession of Strasbourg until 1598. Girolamo Zanchi and Conrad Hubert both appealed to it, but after the 1560s it was regarded as little more than a generic statement of Protestantism. Bucer, however, stayed true to his confession and recited it even on his deathbed.

== Sources ==
- Campbell, Gordon, ed. (2005) [2003]. "Tetrapolitan confession". The Oxford Dictionary of the Renaissance. Oxford University Press. ISBN 978-0-19-860175-3.
- Cross, F. L.; Livingstone, E. A., eds. (2009) [2005]. "Tetrapolitan Confession". The Oxford Dictionary of the Christian Church (3rd rev. ed.). Oxford University Press. ISBN 978-0-19-280290-3.
- Kittelson, James M. (2005) [1996]. "Tetrapolitan Confession". In Hans J. Hillebrand (ed.). The Oxford Encyclopedia of the Reformation. Oxford University Press. ISBN 978-0-19-506493-3.
