= Johannes Oecolampadius =

German Protestant reformer (1482–1531)

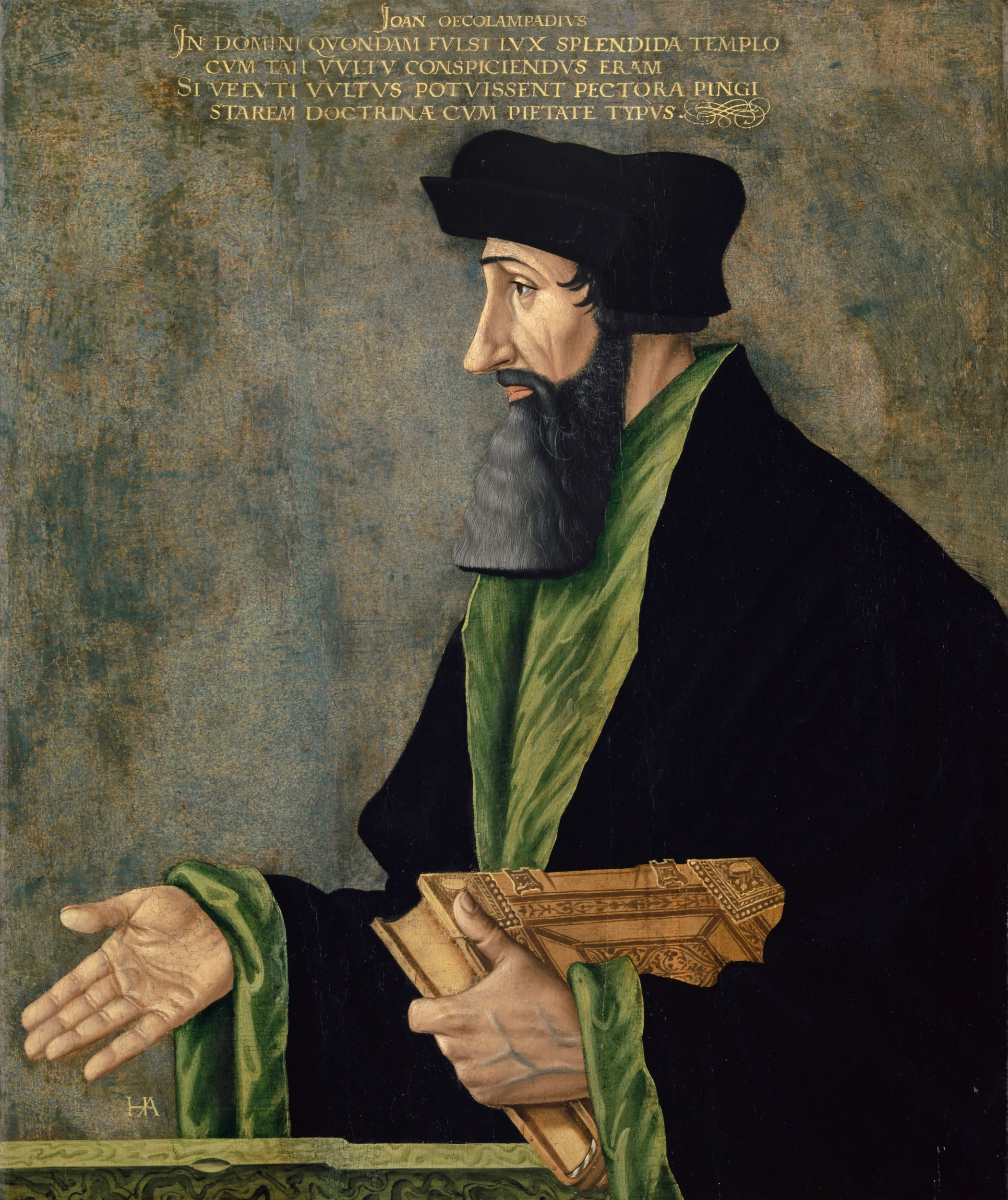
- Posthumous portrait by Hans Asper, before 1550
- Born: 1482; Weinsberg, Electoral Palatinate, Holy Roman Empire
- Died: 24 November 1531 (aged 49); Basel, Old Swiss Confederacy
- Occupation: Theologian
- Theological work
- Tradition or movement: Reformed

Johannes Oecolampadius (also Œcolampadius, in German also Oekolampadius, Oekolampad; 1482 – 24 November 1531) was a German Protestant reformer in the Reformed tradition from the Electoral Palatinate. He was the leader of the Protestant faction in the Baden Disputation of 1526, and he was one of the founders of Protestant theology, engaging in disputes with Erasmus, Huldrych Zwingli, Martin Luther and Martin Bucer.

His German surname was Hussgen (or Heussgen, Huszgen), which he etymologized to Hausschein ("house-shine") and hellenized (as was the custom at the time) to Οἰκολαμπάδιος (Note: An eighteenth-century attested form is Ancient Greek: ΟΙΚΟΛΑΜΠΑΔΙΟΣ in all capital letters, without Greek diacritics, as may be seen in Brucker (Bruckerus) 1752, p. 93, quoting a verse of Johannes Rhellicanus. In modern times, his name has been published in lowercase using polytonic diacritics, viz. (Ancient Greek: Οἰκολαμπάδιος) in katharevousa publications associated with the Greek Orthodox Church, e.g.Hierotheos 2015, p. 2; otherwise, it is spelled Οικολαμπάδιος in Modern Greek, including at Greek Wikipedia.) (Oikolampádios, from οἶκος oîkos, "house," and λαμπάς lampás, "torch, lamp", and -ιος, -ios, "pertaining to"; this was then Latinised as Oecolampadius). (Note: On the surname: Staehelin 1927, p. 605 argues in favour of the long-standing suggestion that the name is simply derived from a dialectal form of Häuschen, i.e. the diminutive of Haus "house".)

== Early life and education ==
Oecolampadius was born as Johannes Heussgen (variously written as Husschyn, Hussgen, Huszgen or Hausschein) in Weinsberg, then part of the Electorate of the Palatinate. He was the son of Johannes Heussgen, a wealthy burgher of Weinberg, and Anna Pfister, from Basel. Oecolampadius attended a latin school at Heilbronn and studied humanities at Heidelberg from 1499 to 1503. Intending to study law, he went to Bologna, but soon returned to Heidelberg and took up theology.

Enthusiastic about the new learning, Oecolampadius passed from the study of Greek to that of Hebrew, taking his bachelor's degree in 1503. He became cathedral preacher at Basel in 1515, serving under Christoph von Utenheim, the evangelical bishop of Basel. In Basel, Oecolampadius became an editorial assistant and Hebrew consultant to Erasmus' first edition of the Greek New Testament, and wrote that edition's epilogue in praise of his master. He obtained a doctorate in theology from the University of Basel in 1518.

== Career ==
From the beginning the sermons of Oecolampadius centred on atonement, and his first reformatory zeal showed itself in a protest (De risu paschali, 1518) against the introduction of humorous stories into Easter sermons. In 1518 he published his Greek Grammar. Two years later, he received an invitation to become preacher in the high church in Augsburg. Germany was ablaze with the questions raised by Martin Luther's theses, and Oecolampadius's introduction into this environment, when he championed Luther's position, especially in his anonymous Canonici indocti (1519), seems to have compelled him to severe self-examination, which ended in his becoming a monk. A short experience convinced him that this was not the ideal Christian life ("amisi monachum, inveni Christianum" — "I have lost the monk; I have found the Christian"). His position as priest in Augsburg was filled by Urbanus Rhegius.

In February 1522 he made his way to Ebernburg, near Kreuznach, where he acted as chaplain to a little group of men holding the new opinions who had settled there under the leadership of Franz von Sickingen.

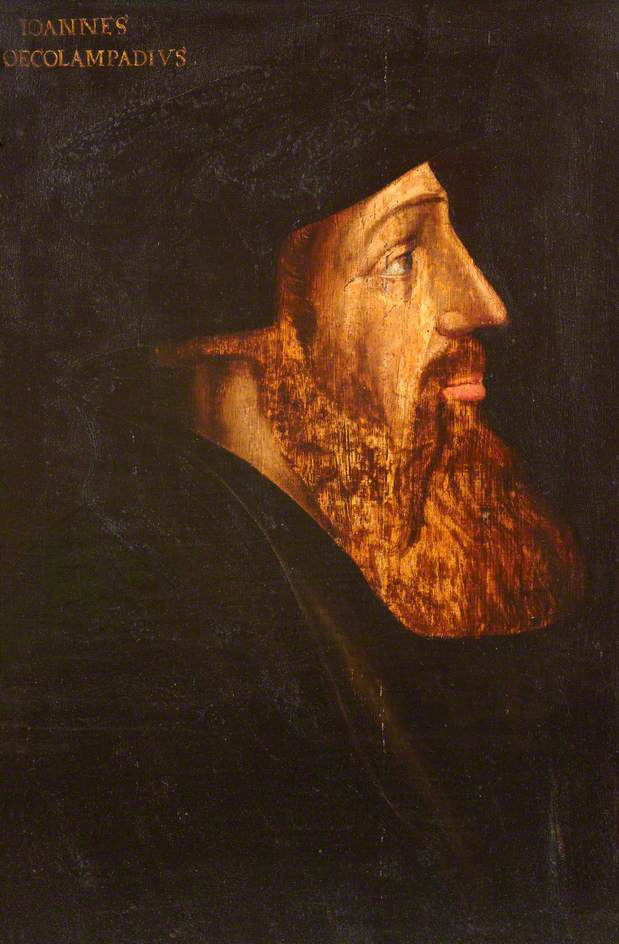
Johannes Œcolampadius by Hans Asper

Oecolampadius returned to Basel in November 1522, as vicar of St Martin's, and (in 1523) reader of the Holy Scripture at the University of Basel. Lecturing on Isaiah, he condemned current ecclesiastical abuses, and in a public disputation (20 August 1523) gained such success that Erasmus writing to Zürich said, "Oecolampadius has the upper hand amongst us." He became Huldrych Zwingli's loyal friend and ally, and after more than a year of earnest preaching and four public disputations in which the popular verdict went in favour of Oecolampadius and his friends, the authorities of Basel began to see the need for Reformation.

At last Oecolampadius was able to refrain from some practices he believed to be superstitious. Basel was slow to accept the Reformation; the news of the Peasants' War of 1524-1525 and the inroads of Anabaptists prevented progress; but by 1525 it seemed as if the authorities were resolved to listen to schemes for restoring the purity of worship and teaching. In the midst of these hopes and difficulties Oecolampadius married, in the beginning of 1528, Wibrandis Rosenblatt, the widow of Ludwig Keller, who proved a suitable wife. After his death she married Wolfgang Fabricius Capito, and, when Capito died, Martin Bucer. She died in 1564.

In January 1528 Oecolampadius and Zwingli took part in the Bern Disputation which led to the adoption of the new faith in that canton, and in the following year to the discontinuance of the Mass at Basel. In 1529 he became officially the Antistes of the Reformed Church in Basel. The Anabaptists claimed Oecolampadius for their views, but in a disputation with them he dissociated himself from most of their positions. In October of 1530 he was visited by Michael Servetus who stayed for about ten months. At first Oecolampadius was impressed by the younger man’s intelligence and scholarship, but eventually he became dismayed by Servetus’ anti-trinitarian theology.

Oecolampadius died on 24 November 1531.

== Theology ==
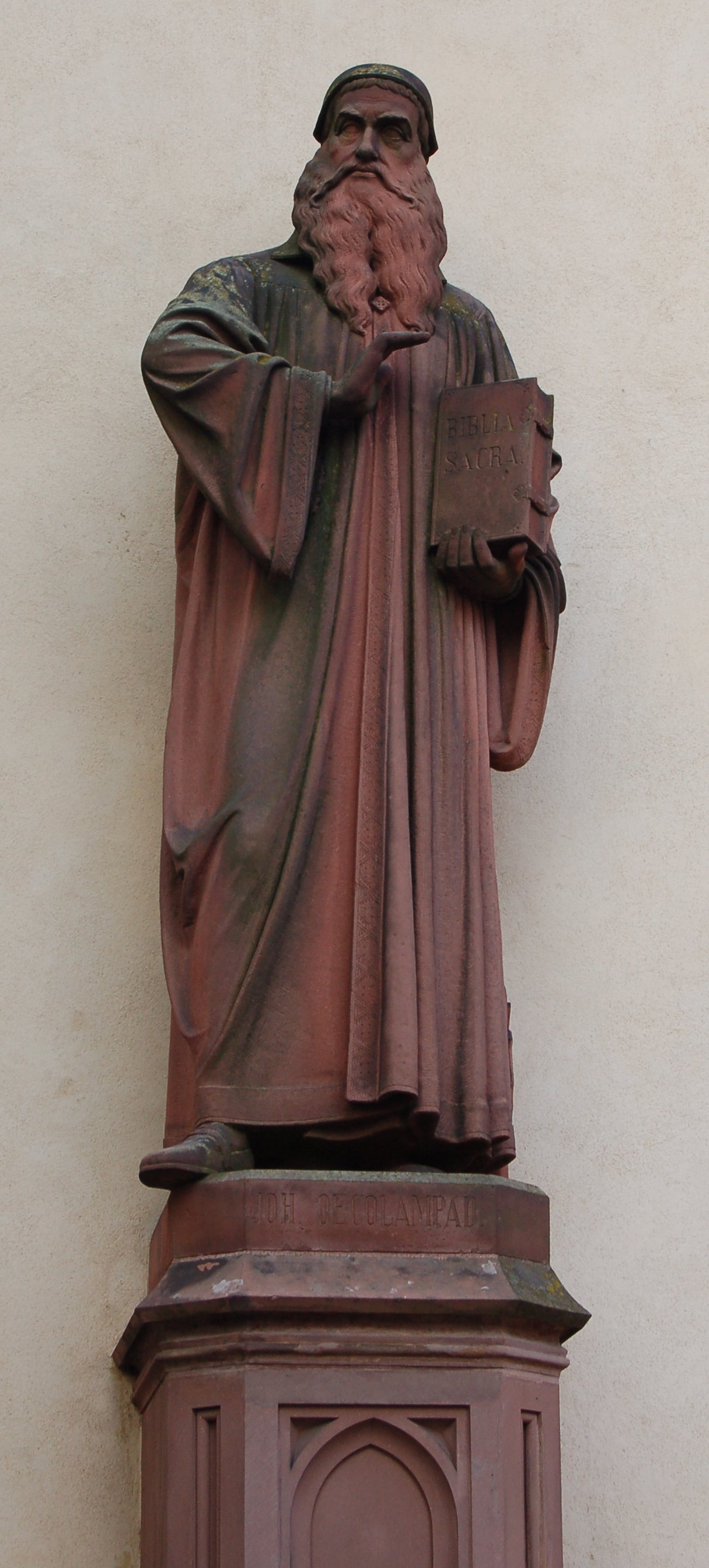
Statue of Oecolampadius at Basel Minster

Oecolampadius, a Protestant theologian, conversed with notables such as Johannes Eck and Philipp Melanchthon, and was professor of theology at the University of Basel. As a theologian, he lacked the glamour of Luther, Zwingli and Calvin, but nonetheless became a trusted religious leader. He was respected even among Catholic scholars of his time and was quoted over forty years after his death by the Jesuit St. Peter Canisius in his work De Maria Virgine. With Zwingli he represented the Swiss at the Marburg Colloquy. His views on the Eucharist upheld the metaphorical against the literal interpretation of the word "body," but he asserted that believers partook of the sacrament more for the sake of others than for their own, though later he emphasized it as a means of grace for the Christian life. To Luther's doctrine of the ubiquity of Christ's body he opposed that of the presence and activity of the Holy Spirit in the church. His views on the Eucharist prompted Luther to publish several sermons on the subject in his 1526 The Sacrament of the Body and Blood of Christ—Against the Fanatics. He did not minutely analyse the doctrine of predestination as Luther, Calvin and Zwingli did, contenting himself with the summary "Our Salvation is of God, our perdition of ourselves."

Theologically he was considered to be close to Zwingli, with whom he shared a friendly attitude towards Mary and Marian veneration. He is considered an example of Protestant Marian piety of his time, largely in light of his sermons. He calls Mary the mediatrix or mediator (Mittlerin) of all graces, to whom the Lord had entrusted the treasure of Grace Thesaurus gratiarum. Oecolampadius borrowed from Radulfus Ardens (d. 1200) and others the image of Mary as the neck who mediates all graces of Christ (the Head) to his mystical body, the church. This view was defended in the 20th century by Gabriel Roschini, and more generally, by Pope Pius XII in his encyclical Mystici corporis as official doctrine of the Catholic Church.

In De laudando in Maria Deo given in Augsburg in 1521, he states that God cannot be praised more in any creature than through Mary. His gifts and graces are expressed in her. God honoured her by becoming human through her. Mary surpassed Abraham with her faith, Isaac with her patience and Joseph with her chastity. She is queen of all heavenly powers. Yet, according to Oecolampadius, Catholic veneration of Mary went too far, because of the numerous titles given to Mary: they surpass in number and content the veneration of Christ himself. The rosary is cited as an example with its 150 Hail Marys and only ten prayers to God. He is also critical of popular customs, by which every Saturday is solemnly observed in her honour, with abstinence from wine and sexual relations, while the following Lord’s day is characterized by heavy drinking and varied entertainments. Throughout his life, Oecolampadius preached the perpetual virginity of Mary, who through her life and her works gave a shining example of Christian virtues. Mary’s life was a life of service and compassion as documented in her visit to Elizabeth.

Religious titles
New title	Antistes of Basel; 1530–1531	Succeeded by Oswald Myconius
