= Judgement of Martin Bucer Concerning Divorce =

Work by John Milton, published 1644

Judgement of Martin Bucer by John Milton was published on 15 July 1644. The work consists mostly of Milton's translations of pro-divorce arguments from Martin Bucer's De Regno Christi. By finding support for his views among orthodox writers, Milton hoped to sway the members of Parliament and the Protestant ministers who had condemned him.

== Background ==
Milton married in spring 1642, and shortly after, his wife Marie Powell left him and returned to live with her mother. The legal statutes of England did not allow for Milton to apply for a divorce and he resorted to promoting the lawfulness of divorce. Although the laws did not change, he wrote four tracts on the topic of divorce, with Judgement of Martin Bucer Concerning Divorce as his second tract. The hostile response by clergymen to the first tract, The Doctrine and Discipline of Divorce, prompted Milton to defend himself by translating Martin Bucer's De Regno Christi and his arguments concerning the legitimacy of divorce. Bucer was a Protestant Reformer and close to the Protestant movement in England, and Milton felt that he would serve as a means to convince Parliamentarians to change their views on divorce. The work was published on 13 August 1644, a week before Milton was attacked in a sermon preached before Parliament by Herbert Palmer.

== Tract ==
The work begins with a preface titled "To the Parlament", and the preface connects the history of Bucer and his reformist ideas with the history of Milton's previous tract on divorce:

For against these my adversaries, who before the examining of a propound truth in a fit time of reformation, have had the conscience to oppose naught els but their blind reproaches and surmises, that a single innocence (his own) might not be opprest and overborn by a crew of mouths for the restoring of a law and doctrin falsely and unlernedly reputed new and scandalous. God... hath unexpectedly rais'd up as it were from the dead... one famous light of the first reformation to bear witnes with me

Milton believed that a translation of Bucer's words would convince Parliament of the truth behind his previous tract on divorce. In the translation, he omits many sections that did not support Milton's purpose (Patterson cites the joys of single life as the main section omitted) and added slight translations that connected to Milton's personal state.
