= Urbanus Rhegius =

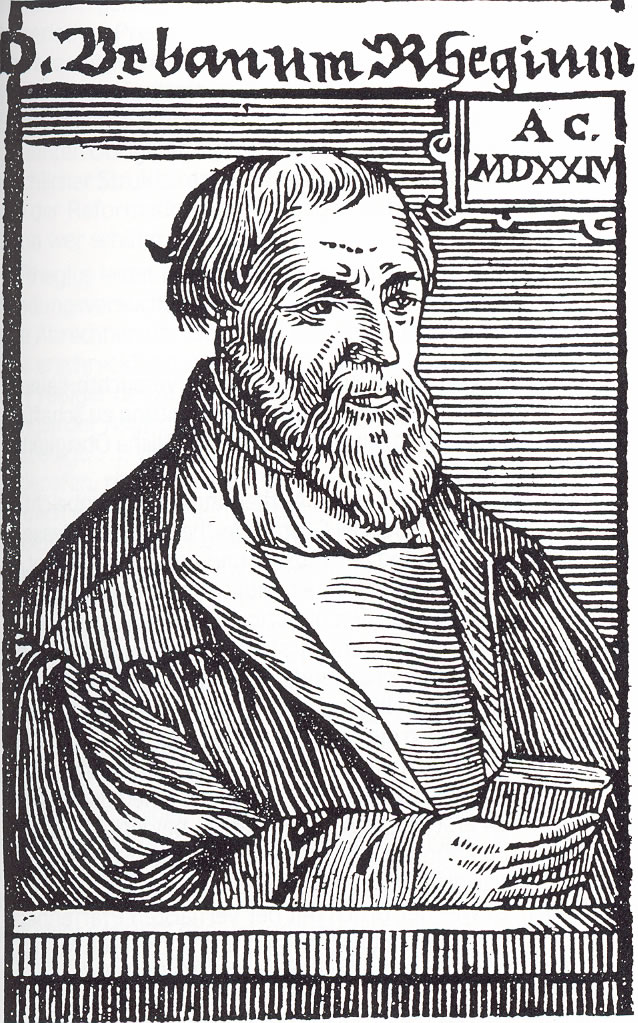
Urbanus Rhegius

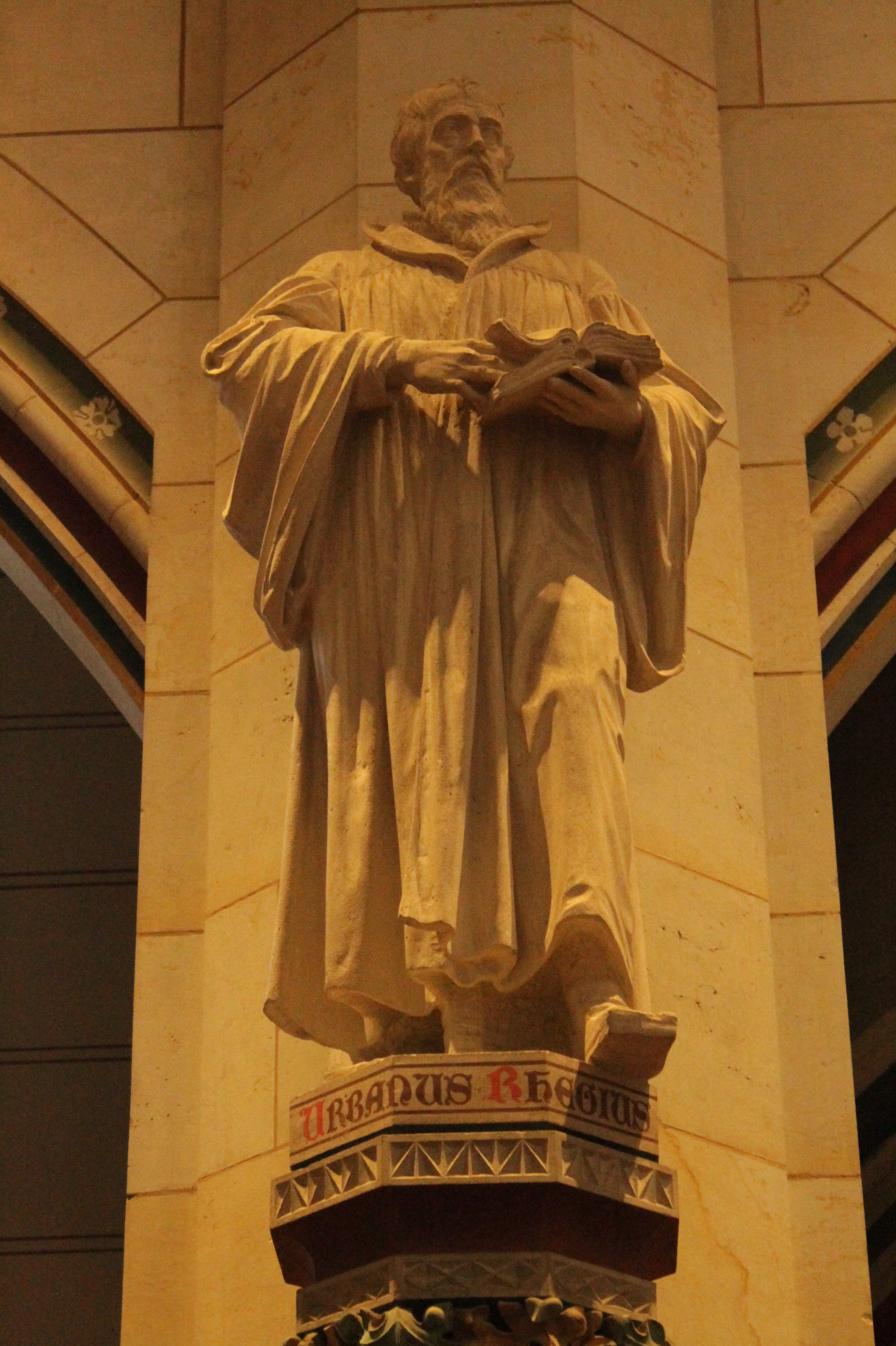
Statue of Urbanus Rhegius, Schlosskirche, Wittenberg

Urbanus Henricus Rhegius or Urban Rieger (May 1489, in Langenargen – 23 May 1541, in Celle) was a Protestant Reformer who was active both in Northern and Southern Germany in order to promote Lutheran unity in the Holy Roman Empire. He was also a popular poet. Martin Luther referred to him as the "Bishop of Lower Saxony".

== Life ==
He was born Urban Rieger, the son of Konrad Rieger, a Catholic priest, and his mistress (priests not being allowed to marry) at Langenargen on Lake Constance.

He was educated at the Latin school in Lindau and then studied arts at Freiburg University. He befriended Wolfgang Capito at the university. After graduating in 1510 he undertook further studies at Ingolstadt University specifically to come under the tutelage of John Eck, graduating MA in 1516. During this period he was created poet laureate by Emperor Maximilian.

In 1519 he went to Konstanz where he befriended Johann Fabri, who encouraged him to train as a preacher, and after brief studies at Tübingen, in 1520 he became a Catholic priest in Augsburg, replacing Johannes Oecolampadius who had left to join the Reform Movement. A condition of this appointment was to gain a doctorate which he did at the University of Basel later that year. From 1521 he began to support the Reform Movement and was a clear admirer of Martin Luther. This forced him to leave his post, and he returned to Langenargen, before going to Hall in the Tyrol where he preached until 1523. Augsburg then invited him to return as preacher for the Carmelite Church of St Anne. Here he began to spread his own ideas in line with the Reform Movement. He initially avoided putting these views in print.

In 1525 he Latinised his name to Urbanus Rhegius. It was under this name that he began publishing Protestant views. He married in this year, usually a forbidden practice as a priest, but accepted in the Protestant views.

From 1527 he began publishing pamphlets against the Anabaptist Movement, which had emerged as a rival movement to both Catholicism and Protestantism. In these early years of Protestantism he proved an arbiter of the different views, particularly the different views on the Eucharist, expressed by Luther and Zwingli, and these views won the admiration of Philip of Hesse. In this capacity, in 1530 he was one of the collaborators (along with Luther and others) who created the Augsburg Confession.

He stayed at Augsburg until 1530 then his final role was as superintendent of the Duchy of Lüneberg (under Ernst of Lüneberg), living thereafter at Celle. From 1535 he was a strong advocate of tolerating the Jews within Germany (an uncommon view at that time).

He died in Celle on 27 May 1541.

== Works (selected) ==
- Nova doctrina, 1526
- Die new Leer sambt jrer Verlegung, 1527
- Seelenarznei, 1529
- Formulae quaedam caute, 1535
- Dialogus von der schönen Predigt, 1536

== Biographies ==
- Dietmar Lamprecht: Urbanus Rhegius: der vergessene Reformator der Lüneburger Heide; eine Erinnerung. Missionsbuchhandlung, Hermannsburg 1980. ISBN 3-87546-024-3
- Prof. Eduard Hindelang (Hrsg.), Walter König: Der Reformator Urbanus Rhegius - Chronik einer Familie zwischen Langenargen und Finkenwerder. ISBN 3-00-019682-X
- Walter König: Urbanus Rhegius: German Protestant Reformer, A History & Genealogy (1489-2001). English Translation by Linda Schwartau Simonton, Jack Kirchner, Walter König. Urbanus Rhegius Press 2023. ISBN 979-8-218-14769-3
