= Martin Bucer =

German Protestant reformer (1491–1551)

The Reverend Martin Bucer
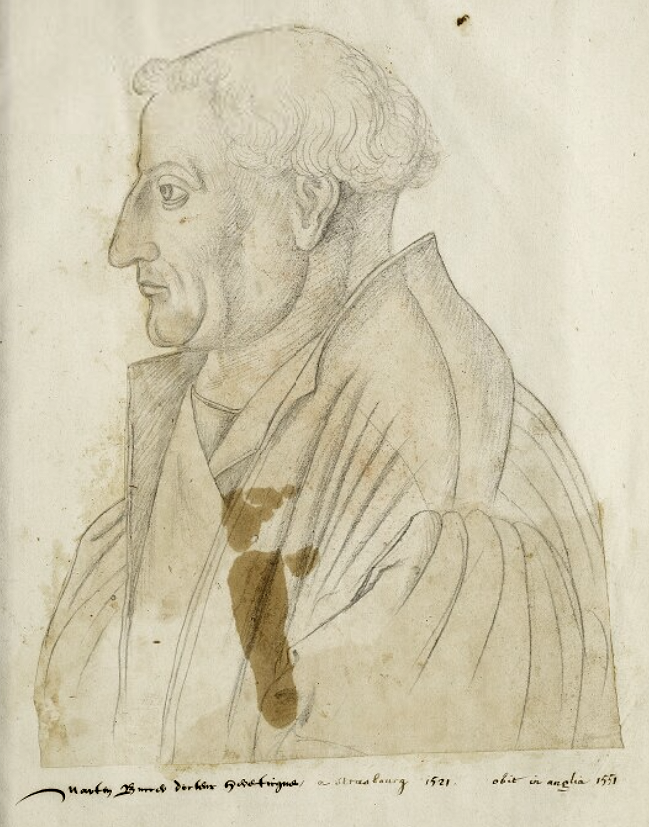
- Portrait, c. 1570
- Born: 11 November 1491; Schlettstadt, Holy Roman Empire (now Sélestat, France)
- Died: 28 February 1551 (aged 59); Cambridge, England
- Occupations: Pastor, theologian
- Notable work: De Regno Christi
- Theological work
- Era: Reformation
- Language: German; Latin
- Tradition or movement: Calvinist
- Notable ideas: Ecumenism

Martin Bucer (/ˈbuːsər/; Early German: Martin Butzer; (Note: When Bucer wrote in German, he used his original name, "Butzer". The Latin form of his name is "Bucerus" and modern scholars have opted to use the abbreviation of the Latin form, "Bucer".) 11 November 1491 – 28 February 1551) was an Alsatian Protestant reformer based in Strasbourg who influenced Lutheran and Anglican doctrines and practices as well as Reformed theology. Bucer was originally a member of the Dominican Order, but after meeting and being influenced by Martin Luther in 1518 he arranged for his monastic vows to be annulled. He then began to work for the Reformation, with the support of Franz von Sickingen.

Bucer's efforts to reform the church in Wissembourg resulted in his excommunication from the Catholic Church, and he was forced to flee to Strasbourg. There he joined a team of reformers which included Matthew Zell, Wolfgang Capito, and Caspar Hedio. He acted as a mediator between the two leading reformers, Martin Luther and Huldrych Zwingli, who differed on the doctrine of the Eucharist. Later, Bucer sought agreement on common articles of faith such as the Tetrapolitan Confession and the Wittenberg Concord, working closely with Philipp Melanchthon on the latter.

Bucer believed that the Catholics in the Holy Roman Empire could be convinced to join the Reformation. Through a series of conferences organised by Charles V, he tried to unite Protestants and Catholics to create a German national church separate from Rome. He did not achieve this, as political events led to the Schmalkaldic War and the retreat of Protestantism within the Empire. However, he continued to promote reforms until the city of Strasbourg accepted the Interim, and forced him to leave.

In 1549, Bucer chose to go to England, where, under the guidance of Thomas Cranmer, he was able to influence both Edwardine Ordinals and the second revision of the Book of Common Prayer. He died in Cambridge, England, at the age of 59. Although his ministry did not lead to the formation of a new denomination, many Protestant denominations have claimed him as one of their own. He is remembered as an early pioneer of ecumenism.

== Historical context ==
Map showing the two partitions that made up Saxony in green and pink. Saxony had long been divided into two principalities, one of which, with its capital at Wittenberg, was an electorate. Charles V transferred the electorate and much of its territory to Albertine Saxony in 1547 after the defeat of the Schmalkaldic League and John Frederick I, Elector of Saxony. Hesse was to the west of Saxony. Important cities that Bucer visited are shown in red.

In the 16th century, the Holy Roman Empire was divided into many princely and city states that provided a powerful check on the rule of the Holy Roman Emperor. The division of power between the emperor and the various states made the Reformation in Germany possible, as individual states defended reformers within their territories. In the Electorate of Saxony, Martin Luther was supported by the elector Frederick III and his successors John and John Frederick. Philip I, Landgrave of Hesse—whose lands lay midway between Saxony and the Rhine—also supported the Reformation, and he figured prominently in the lives of both Luther and Bucer. The Emperor Charles V was often distracted by war with France and the Ottoman Empire and in Italy. The political rivalry among all the players greatly influenced the ecclesiastical developments within the Empire.

In addition to the princely states, free imperial cities, nominally under the control of the Emperor but really ruled by councils that acted like sovereign governments, were scattered throughout the Empire. As the Reformation took root, clashes broke out in many cities between local reformers and conservative city magistrates. It was in a free imperial city, Strasbourg, that Martin Bucer began his work. Located on the western frontier of the Empire, Strasbourg was closely allied with the Swiss cities that had thrown off the imperial yoke. Some had adopted a reformed religion distinct from Lutheranism, in which humanist social concepts and the communal ethic played a greater role. Along with a group of free imperial cities in the south and west of the German lands, Strasbourg followed this pattern of Reformation. It was ruled by a complex local government largely under the control of a few powerful families and wealthy guildsmen. In Bucer's time, social unrest was growing as lower-level artisans resented their social immobility and the widening income gap. The citizens may not have planned revolution, but they were receptive to new ideas that might transform their lives.

== Early years (1491–1523) ==
Martin Bucer was born in Sélestat (Schlettstadt), Alsace, a free imperial city of the Holy Roman Empire. His father and grandfather, both named Claus Butzer, were coopers (barrelmakers) by trade. (Note: Eells 1931, p. 1 gives his father's and grandfather's names as "Nicholas" and says his father was a shoemaker.) Almost nothing is known about Bucer's mother. Bucer likely attended Sélestat's prestigious Latin school, where artisans sent their children. (Note: Greschat 2004, pp. 7–10 gives the history and details of this prestigious school in Sélestat.) He completed his studies in the summer of 1507 and joined the Dominican Order as a novice. Bucer later claimed his grandfather had forced him into the order. After a year, he was consecrated as an acolyte in the Strasbourg church of the Williamites, and he took his vows as a full Dominican friar. In 1510, he was ordained as a deacon.

By 1515, Bucer was studying theology in the Dominican monastery in Heidelberg. The following year, he took a course in dogmatics in Mainz, where he was ordained a priest, returning to Heidelberg in January 1517 to enroll in the university. Around this time, he became influenced by humanism, and he started buying books published by Johannes Froben, some by the great humanist Erasmus. A 1518 inventory of Bucer's books includes the major works of Thomas Aquinas, leader of medieval scholasticism in the Dominican Order.

In April 1518, Johannes von Staupitz, the vicar-general of the Augustinians, invited the Wittenberg reformer Martin Luther to argue his theology at the Heidelberg Disputation. Here Bucer met Luther for the first time. In a long letter to his mentor, Beatus Rhenanus, Bucer recounted what he learned, and he commented on several of Luther's Ninety-five Theses. He largely agreed with them and perceived the ideas of Luther and Erasmus to be in concordance. Because meeting Luther posed certain risks, he asked Rhenanus to ensure his letter did not fall into the wrong hands. He also wrote his will, which contains the inventory of his books. In early 1519, Bucer received the baccalaureus degree, and that summer he stated his theological views in a disputation before the faculty at Heidelberg, revealing his break with Aquinas and scholasticism.

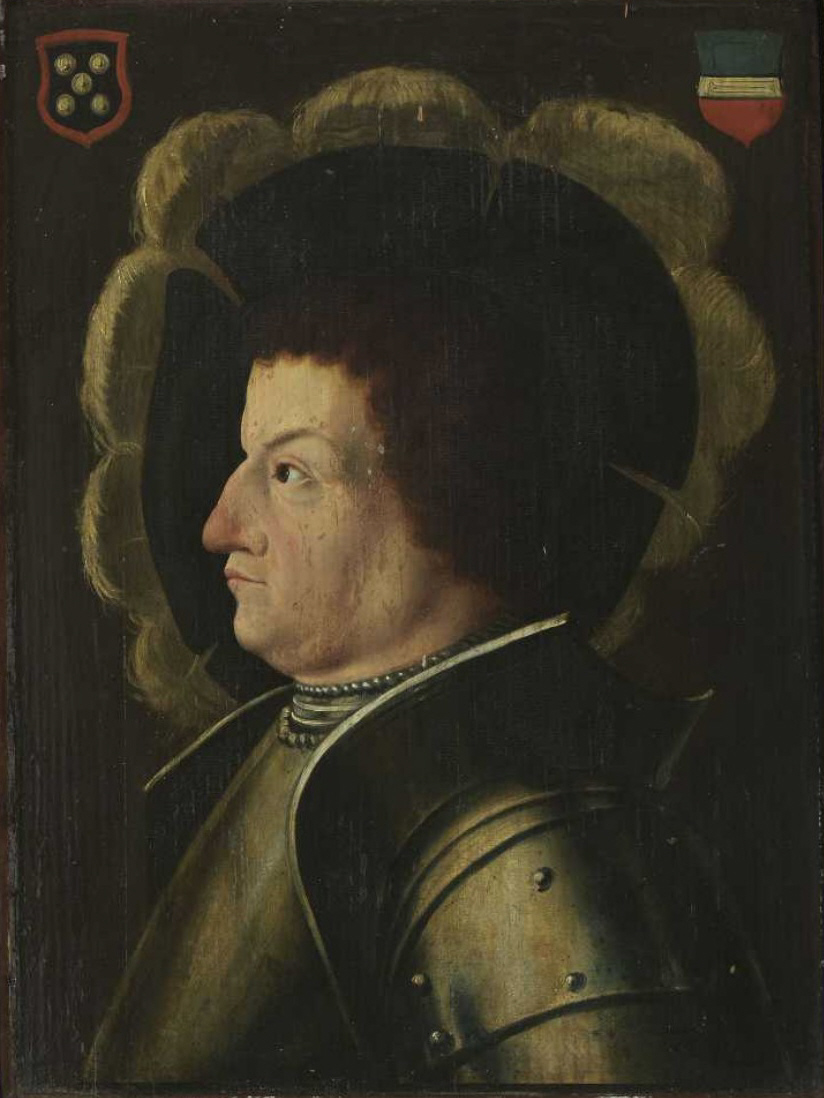
Franz von Sickingen was the protector and defender of Martin Bucer during his early years.

The events that caused Bucer to leave the Dominican Order arose from his embrace of new ideas and his growing contact with other humanists and reformers. A fellow Dominican, Jacob van Hoogstraaten, the Grand Inquisitor of Cologne, tried to prosecute Johann Reuchlin, a humanist scholar. Other humanists, including the nobles Ulrich von Hutten and Imperial Knight Franz von Sickingen, took Reuchlin's side. Hoogstraten was thwarted, but he now planned to target Bucer. On 11 November 1520, Bucer told the reformer Wolfgang Capito in a letter that Hoogstraaten was threatening to make an example of him as a follower of Luther. To escape Dominican jurisdiction, Bucer needed to be freed of his monastic vows. Capito and others were able to expedite the annulment of his vows, and on 29 April 1521 he was formally released from the Dominican Order.

For the next two years, Bucer was protected by Sickingen and Hutten. He also worked for a time at the court of Ludwig V, Elector Palatine, as chaplain to Ludwig's younger brother Frederick. Sickingen was a senior figure at Ludwig's court. This appointment enabled Bucer to live in Nuremberg, the most powerful city of the Empire, whose governing officials were strongly reformist. There he met many people who shared his viewpoint, including the humanist Willibald Pirckheimer and the future Nuremberg reformer Andreas Osiander. In September 1521, Bucer accepted Sickingen's offer of the position of pastor at Landstuhl, where Sickingen had a castle, and Bucer moved to the town in May 1522. In summer 1522, he met and married Elisabeth Silbereisen, a former nun.

Sickingen also offered to pay for Bucer to study in Wittenberg. On his way, Bucer stopped in the town of Wissembourg, whose leading reformer, Heinrich Motherer, asked him to become his chaplain. Bucer agreed to interrupt his journey and went to work immediately, preaching daily sermons in which he attacked traditional church practices and monastic orders. On the basis of his belief that the Bible was the sole source for knowledge to attain salvation (sola scriptura), he preached that the Mass should not be considered as the recrucifying of Christ, but rather the reception of God's gift of salvation through Christ. He accused the monks of creating additional rules above what is contained in the Bible. He summarised his convictions in six theses, and called for a public disputation. His opponents, the local Franciscans and Dominicans, ignored him, but his sermons incited the townspeople to threaten the town's monasteries. The bishop of Speyer reacted by excommunicating Bucer, and although the town council continued to support him, events beyond Wissembourg left Bucer in danger. His leading benefactor, Franz von Sickingen, was defeated and killed during the Knights' War, and Ulrich von Hutten became a fugitive. The Wissembourg council urged Bucer and Motherer to leave, and on 13 May 1523 they fled to nearby Strasbourg.

== Reformer in Strasbourg (1523–1525) ==
Bucer, excommunicated and without means of subsistence, was in a precarious situation when he arrived in Strasbourg. He was not a citizen of the city, a status that afforded protection, and on 9 June 1523 he wrote an urgent letter to the Zürich reformer, Huldrych Zwingli, pleading for a safe post in Switzerland. Fortunately for Bucer, the Strasbourg council was under the influence of the reformer, Matthew Zell; during Bucer's first few months in the city he worked as Zell's unofficial chaplain and was able to give classes on books of the Bible. The largest guild in Strasbourg, the Gärtner or Gardeners, appointed him as the pastor of St Aurelia's Church on 24 August 1523. A month later the council accepted his application for citizenship.

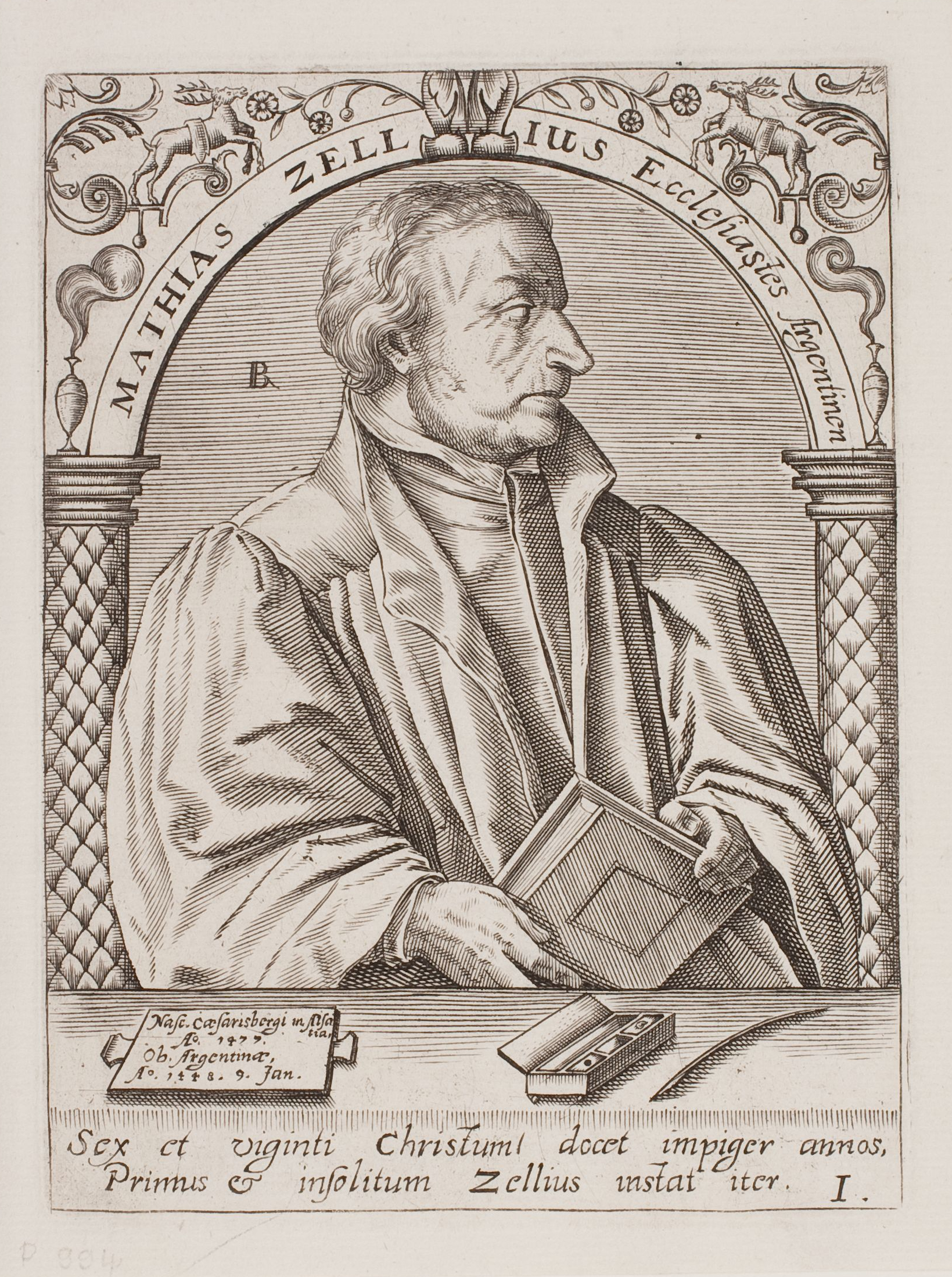
Matthew Zell was the first major reformer in Strasbourg and supported Bucer on his arrival in the city.

In Strasbourg, Bucer joined a team of notable reformers: Zell, who took the role of the preacher to the masses; Wolfgang Capito, the most influential theologian in the city; and Caspar Hedio, the cathedral preacher. One of Bucer's first actions in the cause of reform was to debate with Thomas Murner, a monk who had attacked Luther in satires. While the city council vacillated on religious issues, the number of people supporting the Reformation and hostile towards the traditional clergy had grown.

The hostility reached a boiling point when Conrad Treger, the prior provincial of the Augustinians, denounced the reformist preachers and the burghers of Strasbourg as heretics. On 5 September 1524, angry mobs broke into the monasteries, looting and destroying religious images. Many opponents of the Reformation were arrested, including Treger. After the council requested an official statement from the reformers, Bucer drafted twelve articles summarising the teachings of the Reformation, including justification by faith (sola fide). He rejected the Mass and Catholic concepts such as monastic vows, veneration of saints, and purgatory. He refused to recognise the authority of the pope and instead emphasised obedience to the government. Treger was released on 12 October and left Strasbourg. With his departure, overt opposition to the Reformation ended in the city.

The reformers' first goal was the creation of a new order of service—at this time the Strasbourg reformers followed Zwingli's liturgy. They presented proposals for a common order of service for the entire Reformation movement to the theologians of Wittenberg and Zürich. In Bucer's book Grund und Ursach (Basis and Cause), published in December 1524, he attacked the idea of the Mass as a sacrifice, and rejected liturgical garments, the altar, and certain forms of ritual. It was also this publication that acknowledged the introduction of congregational German hymn singing in the city. (Only his preface to the 1541 Gesangbuch surpassed it in terms of musical significance.) By May 1525, liturgical reforms had been implemented in Strasbourg's parish churches, but the city council decided to allow masses to continue in the cathedral and in the collegiate churches St. Thomas, Young St Peter, and Old St Peter.

== Dialogue with Luther and Zwingli (1524–1530) ==
Beginning in 1524, Bucer concentrated on the main issue dividing leading reformers, the eucharist. In this dispute, he attempted to mediate between Martin Luther and Huldrych Zwingli. The two theologians disagreed on whether the body and blood of Christ were physically present within the elements of bread and wine during the celebration of the Lord's Supper. Luther believed in a corporeal or physical real presence of Christ; and Zwingli believed Christ's body and blood were made present by the Holy Spirit. By late 1524, Bucer had abandoned the idea of corporeal real presence and, after some exegetical studies, accepted Zwingli's interpretation. However, he did not believe the Reformation depended on either position but on faith in Christ, other matters being secondary. In this respect he differed from Zwingli.

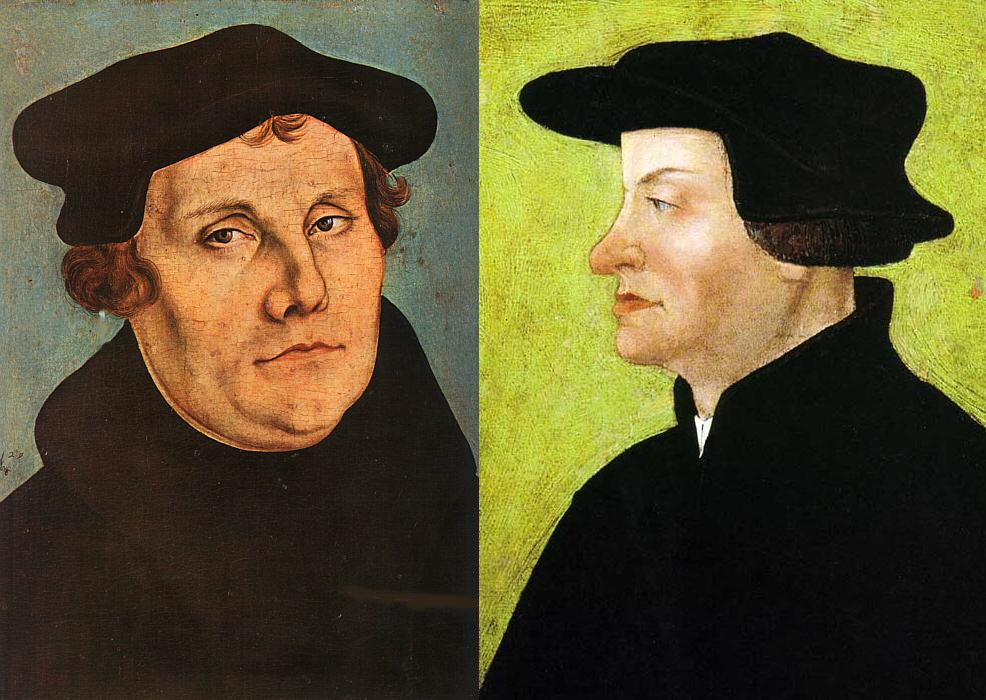
Bucer tried to mediate between Martin Luther (left) and Huldrych Zwingli (right) on doctrinal matters.

In March 1526, Bucer published Apologia, defending his views. He proposed a formula that he hoped would satisfy both sides: different understandings of scripture were acceptable, and church unity was assured so long as both sides had a "child-like faith in God". Bucer stated that his and Zwingli's interpretation on the eucharist was the correct one, but while he considered the Wittenberg theologians to be in error, he accepted them as brethren as they agreed on the fundamentals of faith. He also published two translations of works by Luther and Johannes Bugenhagen, interpolating his own interpretation of the Lord's Supper into the text. This outraged the Wittenberg theologians and damaged their relations with Bucer. In 1528, when Luther published Vom Abendmahl Christi, Bekenntnis [Confession Concerning Christ's Supper] (in German), detailing Luther's concept of the sacramental union, Bucer responded with a treatise of his own, Vergleichnung D. Luthers, und seins gegentheyls, vom Abendmal Christi [Conciliation between Dr. Luther and His Opponents Regarding Christ's Supper] (in German). It took the form of a dialogue between two merchants, one from Nuremberg who supported Luther and the other from Strasbourg who supported Bucer, with the latter winning over his opponent. Bucer noted that as Luther had rejected impanation, the idea that Christ was "made into bread", there was no disagreement between Luther and Zwingli; both believed in a spiritual presence of Christ in the eucharist. Luther harshly rejected Bucer's interpretation.

During this time, Bucer and Zwingli remained in close touch, discussing other aspects of theology and practice such as the use of religious images and the liturgy. Bucer did not hesitate to disagree with Zwingli on occasion, although unity between Strasbourg and the Swiss churches took priority over such differences. In 1527, Bucer and Capito attended the Bern Disputation to decide whether the city should accept reformed doctrines and practices. Bucer provided strong support for Zwingli's leading role in the disputation, which finally brought the Reformation to Bern.

The last meeting between Zwingli and Luther was at the Marburg Colloquy of October 1529, organised by Philip of Hesse and attended by various leading reformers, including Bucer. Luther and Zwingli agreed on 13 of the 14 topics discussed, but Zwingli did not accept the doctrine of the real presence, on which Luther would not compromise. After the discussion broke down between the two, Bucer tried to salvage the situation, but Luther noted, "It is obvious that we do not have one and the same spirit." The meeting ended in failure. The following year, Bucer wrote of his disappointment at doctrinal inflexibility:

If you immediately condemn anyone who doesn't quite believe the same as you do as forsaken by Christ's Spirit, and consider anyone to be the enemy of truth who holds something false to be true, who, pray tell, can you still consider a brother? I for one have never met two people who believed exactly the same thing. This holds true in theology as well.

== Competing Protestant confessions (1530–1533) ==
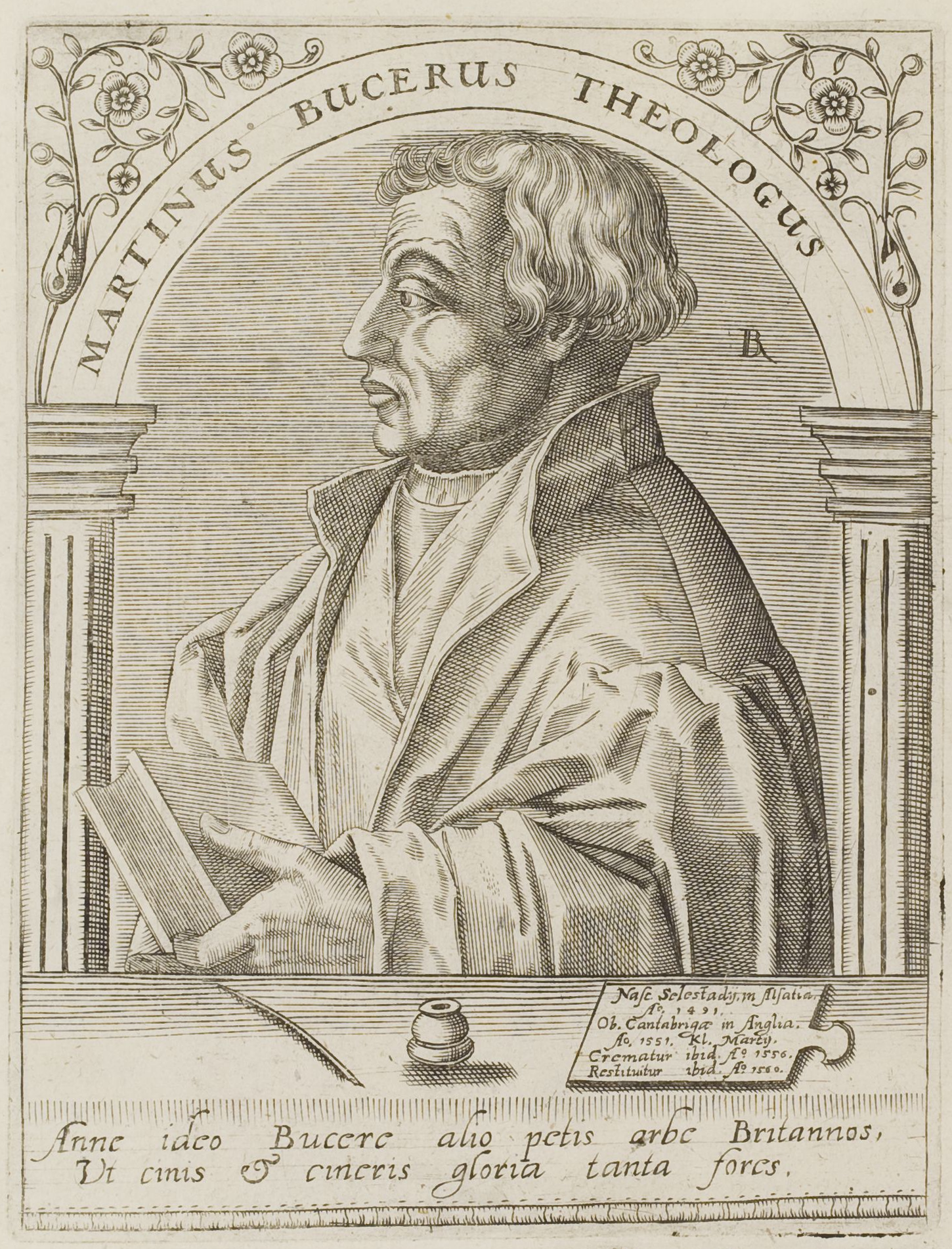
Boissard, Jean-Jacques, "Martin Bucer", Icones quinquaginta vivorum (portrait) (in Latin)

The extent of the theological division among the reformers became evident when the Holy Roman Emperor Charles V asked them to present their views to him in 1530 at the Diet of Augsburg. Philipp Melanchthon, the main delegate from Wittenberg, quickly prepared the draft that eventually became the Augsburg Confession. The Wittenberg theologians rejected attempts by Strasbourg to adopt it without the article on the Lord's Supper. In response, Bucer wrote a new confession, the Confessio Tetrapolitana (Tetrapolitan Confession), so named because only four cities adopted it, Strasbourg and three other southern German cities, Konstanz, Memmingen, and Lindau. A copy of Melanchthon's draft was used as the starting point and the only major change was the wording on the article on the eucharist. According to Eells, the article on the eucharist in the Tetrapolitan Confession stated, "In this sacrament his true body and true blood are truly given to eat and drink, as food for their souls, and to eternal life, that they may remain in him and he in them". The ambiguous word "truly" was not defined.

Charles, however, decreed on 22 September that all reformers must reconcile with the Catholic faith, or he would use military force to suppress them. This prompted Melanchthon to call a meeting with Bucer and after lengthy discussions they agreed on nine theses, which they sent to Luther and to Strasbourg. The Strasbourg magistrates forwarded them to Basel and Zürich. Bucer met Luther in Coburg on 26–28 September. Luther still rejected Bucer's theses, but he encouraged him to continue the search for unity. Bucer then traveled to several southern German cities, including Ulm, Isny, Konstanz, Memmingen, and Lindau, and to the Swiss cities of Basel and Zürich. In Zurich on 12 October, he presented the articles to Zwingli, who neither opposed him nor agreed with him.

In February 1531, the evangelical princes and cities of the Empire set up the Protestant Schmalkaldic League to defend the reformed religion. Strasbourg's Jakob Sturm negotiated the city's inclusion on the basis of the Tetrapolitan Confession. By this time, Bucer's relationship with Zwingli was deteriorating. Strasbourg's political ties with the Elector of Saxony, and Bucer's partial theological support of Luther, became too much for Zwingli, and on 21 February 1531, he wrote to Bucer ending their friendship. When representatives of the southern German cities convened in Ulm on 23–24 March 1532 to discuss their alliance with the Schmalkaldic League, Bucer advised them to sign the Augsburg Confession, if they were being pressured to do so. For Bucer to recommend the rival confession over his own version surprised the Swiss cities. Luther continued his polemical attacks on Bucer, but Bucer was unperturbed: "In any case, we must seek unity and love in our relationships with everyone," he wrote, "regardless of how they behave toward us." In April and May 1533, he again toured the southern German cities and Swiss cities. The latter remained unconvinced and did not join the Protestant alliance.

== Organising the Strasbourg church (1529–1534) ==
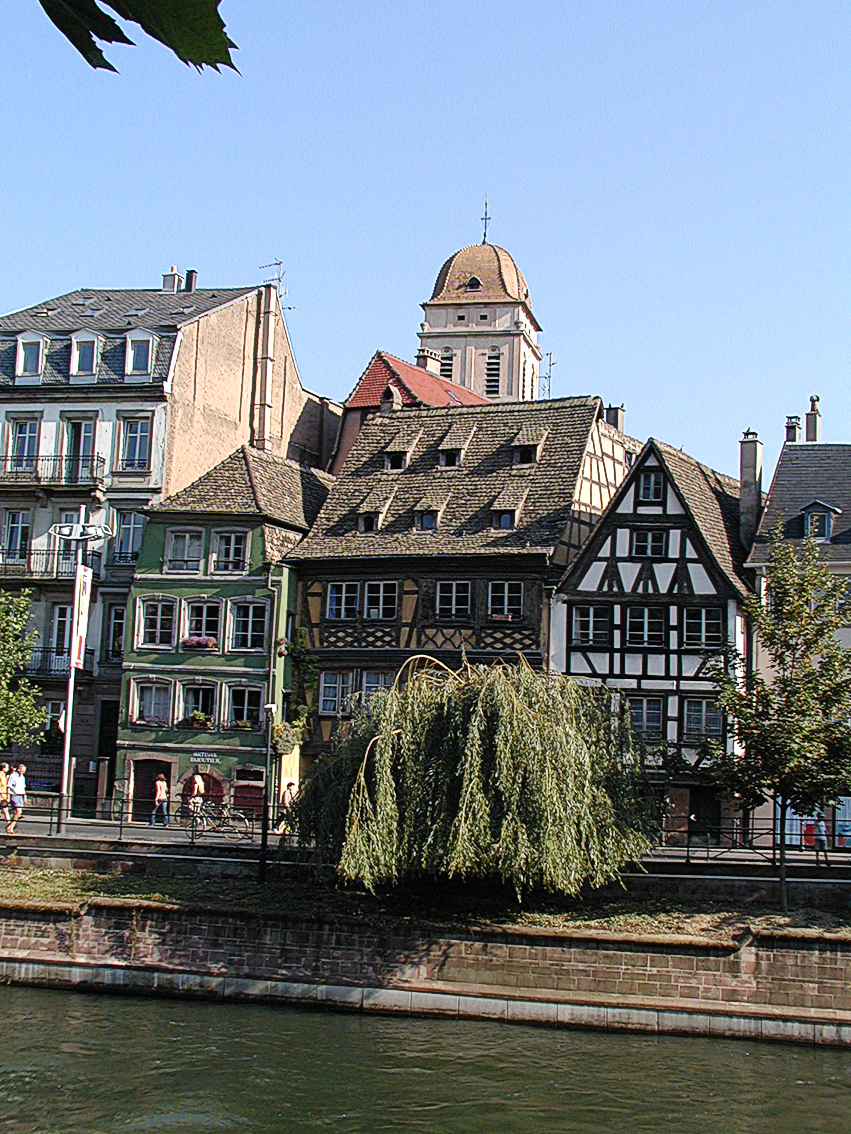
The Church of the Penitent Magdalens' steeple behind timber-framed houses extant since the time of Martin Bucer

While these events unfolded, the reformers in Strasbourg were slowly making progress. Their pressure on the council to ban all masses finally succeeded. On 20 February 1529, Strasbourg openly joined the Reformation when the practice of the mass was officially suspended. In its place, two preaching services (Predigtgottesdienste) per Sunday were held in all the parish churches. On 5 January 1530, when Strasbourg joined the alliance of Swiss cities, the Christliches Burgrecht (Christian Confederation), the council systematically removed images and side altars from the churches. Bucer had at first tolerated images in places of worship as long as they were not venerated. He later came to believe they should be removed because of their potential for abuse, and he advocated in a treatise for their orderly removal. First the authority of the magistrates should be obtained, and then the people instructed on abandoning devotion to images.

Bucer's priority in Strasbourg was to instill moral discipline in the church. To this end, special wardens (Kirchenpfleger), chosen from among the laity, were assigned to each congregation to supervise both doctrine and practice. His concerns were motivated by the effects of a rapidly rising refugee population, attracted by Strasbourg's tolerant asylum policies. Influxes of refugees, particularly after 1528, had brought a series of revolutionary preachers into Strasbourg. These men were inspired by a variety of apocalyptic and mystical doctrines, and in some cases by hostility towards the social order and the notion of an official church. Significant numbers of refugees were Anabaptists and spiritualists, such as the followers of Melchior Hoffman, Caspar Schwenckfeld, and Clemens Ziegler. Bucer personally took responsibility for attacking these and other popular preachers to minimize their influence and secure their expulsion and that of their followers. On 30 November 1532, the pastors and wardens of the church petitioned the council to enforce ethical standards, officially sanction the reformed faith, and refute the "sectarian" doctrines. The ruling authorities, who had allowed sectarian congregations to thrive among the refugees and lower orders, would only expel the obvious troublemakers. Bucer insisted that the council urgently take control of all Christian worship in the city for the common good.

In response to the petition, the council set up a commission that proposed a city synod. For this gathering, Bucer provided a draft document of sixteen articles on church doctrine. The synod convened on 3 June 1533 at the Church of the Penitent Magdalens to debate Bucer's text, eventually accepting it in full. Sectarian leaders were brought before the synod and questioned by Bucer. Ziegler was dismissed and allowed to stay in Strasbourg; Hoffmann was imprisoned as a danger to the state; and Schwenckfeld left Strasbourg of his own accord.

Following the synod, the city council dragged its heels for several months. The synod commission, which included Bucer and Capito, decided to take the initiative and produced a draft ordinance for the regulation of the church. It proposed that the council assume almost complete control of the church, with responsibility for supervising doctrine, appointing church wardens, and maintaining moral standards. Still the council delayed, driving the pastors to the brink of resignation. Only when Hoffman's followers seized power in Münster, in the Münster Rebellion, did the council act, fearing a similar incident in Strasbourg. On 4 March 1534, the council announced that Bucer's Tetrapolitan Confession and his sixteen articles on church doctrine were now official church statements of faith. All Anabaptists should either subscribe to these documents or leave the city. The decision established a new church in Strasbourg, with Capito declaring, "Bucer is the bishop of our church."

== Champion of Protestant unity (1534–1538) ==
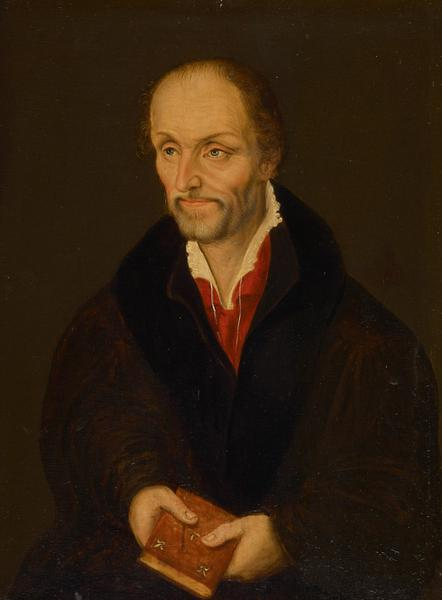
Philipp Melanchthon worked closely with Bucer on many theological documents to advance the reformed cause.

By 1534, Bucer was a key figure in the German Reformation. He repeatedly led initiatives to secure doctrinal agreement between Wittenberg, the south German cities, and Switzerland. In December 1534, Bucer and Melanchthon held productive talks in Kassel, and Bucer then drafted ten theses that the Wittenberg theologians accepted. In October 1535, Luther suggested a meeting in Eisenach to conclude a full agreement among the Protestant factions. Bucer persuaded the south Germans to attend, but the Swiss, led by Zwingli's successor Heinrich Bullinger, were skeptical of his intentions. Instead they met in Basel on 1 February 1536 to draft their own confession of faith. Bucer and Capito attended and urged the Swiss to adopt a compromise wording on the eucharist that would not offend the Lutherans. The true presence of Christ was acknowledged while a natural or local union between Christ and the elements was denied. The result was the First Helvetic Confession, the success of which raised Bucer's hopes for the upcoming meeting with Luther.

The meeting, moved to Wittenberg because Luther was ill, began on 21 May 1536. To the surprise of the south Germans, Luther began by attacking them, demanding that they recant their false understanding of the eucharist. Capito intervened to calm matters, and Bucer claimed that Luther had misunderstood their views on the issue. The Lutherans insisted that unbelievers who partake of the eucharist truly receive the body and blood of Christ. Bucer and the south Germans believed that they receive only the elements of the bread and the wine. Johannes Bugenhagen formulated a compromise, approved by Luther, that distinguished between the unworthy (indigni) and the unbelievers (impii). The south Germans accepted that the unworthy receive Christ, and the question of what unbelievers receive was left unanswered. The two sides then worked fruitfully on other issues and on 28 May signed the Wittenberg Concord. Strasbourg quickly endorsed the document, but much coaxing from Bucer was required before he managed to convince all the south German cities. The Swiss cities were resistant, Zürich in particular. They rejected even a mild statement suggesting a union of Christ with the elements of the eucharist. Bucer advised the Swiss to hold a national synod to decide on the matter, hoping he could at least persuade Bern and Basel. The synod met in Zürich from 28 May to 4 April 1538, but Bucer failed to win over a single city. The Swiss never accepted or rejected the Wittenberg Concord.

Bucer's influence on the Swiss was eventually felt indirectly. In summer 1538, he invited John Calvin, the future reformer of Geneva, to lead a French refugee congregation in Strasbourg. Bucer and Calvin had much in common theologically and maintained a long friendship. The extent to which Bucer influenced Calvin is an open question among modern scholars, but many of the reforms that Calvin later implemented in Geneva, including the liturgy and the church organisation, were originally developed in Strasbourg.

== Advice to Philip of Hesse (1538–1539) ==
When Philip of Hesse's law on the protection of the Jews in his territory expired in 1538, he commissioned Bucer to create a new policy. Philip gave him a draft that was tolerant in the regulation of their affairs. Bucer rejected the favourable conditions and recommended that Jews be prohibited from all trades except those providing minimum subsistence. His Judenratschlag also included his first use of negative stereotypes of the Jews. Philip's ordinance of 1539 represented a compromise. He allowed the Jews to engage in trade and commerce but included strict rules on their association with Christians. The potential for an arbitrary enforcement of the new policy was frightening, and as a result many Jews chose to leave Hesse. For this Bucer must share part of the blame.

In November 1539, Philip asked Bucer to produce a theological defence of bigamy, since he had decided to contract a bigamous marriage. Bucer reluctantly agreed, on condition the marriage be kept secret. Bucer consulted Luther and Melanchthon, and the three reformers presented Philip with a statement of advice (Wittenberger Ratschlag); later, Bucer produced his own arguments for and against bigamy. Although the document specified that bigamy could be sanctioned only under rare conditions, Philip took it as approval for his marriage to a lady-in-waiting of his sister. When rumours of the marriage spread, Luther told Philip to deny it, while Bucer advised him to hide his second wife and conceal the truth. Some scholars have noted a possible motivation for this notorious advice: the theologians believed they had advised Philip as a pastor would his parishioner, and that a lie was justified to guard the privacy of their confessional counsel. The scandal that followed the marriage caused Philip to lose political influence, and the Reformation within the Empire was severely compromised.

== Doctrinal issues (1539–1542) ==
At the end of 1538, shortly before the Catholic Duke Georg of Saxony died, a religious colloquy was convened in Leipzig to discuss potential reforms within the Duchy. The Electorate of Saxony sent Melanchthon, and Philip of Hesse sent Bucer. The Duchy itself was represented by Georg Witzel, a former Lutheran who had reconverted to Catholicism. In discussions from 2 to 7 January 1539, Bucer and Witzel agreed to defer controversial points of doctrine, but Melanchthon withdrew, feeling that doctrinal unity was a prerequisite of a reform plan. Bucer and Witzel agreed on fifteen articles covering various issues of church life. Bucer, however, made no doctrinal concessions: he remained silent on critical matters such as the mass and the papacy. His ecumenical approach provoked harsh criticism from other reformers.

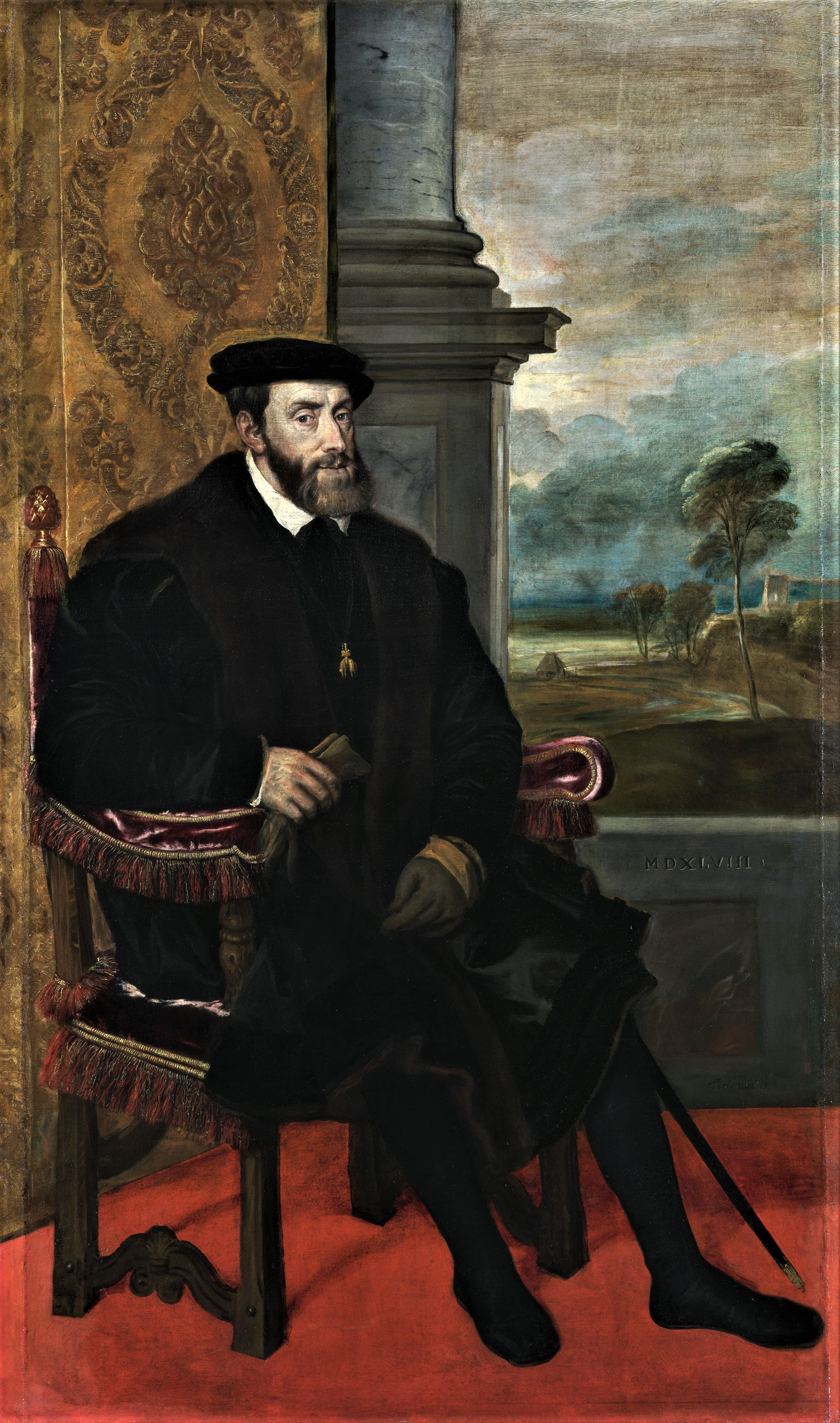
Charles V attempted to win back Protestant princes through a series of colloquies and imperial diets. When reconciliation failed, he sought to suppress Protestant resistance in the Schmalkaldic War.

In the Truce of Frankfurt of 1539, Charles and the leaders of the Schmalkaldic League agreed on a major colloquy to settle all religious issues within the Empire. Bucer placed great hopes on this meeting: he believed it would be possible to convince most German Catholics to accept the doctrine of sola fide as the basis for discussions on all other issues. Under various pseudonyms, he published tracts promoting a German national church. A conference in Haguenau began on 12 June 1540, but during a month's discussion the two sides failed to agree on a common starting point. They decided to reconvene in Worms. Melanchthon led the Protestants, with Bucer a major influence behind the scenes. When the colloquy again made no progress, the imperial chancellor, Nicholas Perrenot de Granvelle, called for secret negotiations. Bucer then began working with Johannes Gropper, a delegate of the archbishop of Cologne, Hermann von Wied. Aware of the risks of such apparent collusion, he was determined to forge unity among the German churches. The two agreed on twenty-three articles in which Bucer conceded some issues toward the Catholic position. These included justification, the sacraments, and the organisation of the church. Four disputed issues were left undecided: veneration of the saints, private masses, auricular confession, and transubstantiation. The results were published in the "Worms Book", which they confidentially presented to a prince on each side of the religious divide: Philip of Hesse and Joachim II, Elector of Brandenburg.

The Worms Book laid the groundwork for final negotiations at the Diet of Regensburg in 1541. Charles created a small committee, consisting of Johannes Eck, Gropper, and Julius Pflug on the Catholic side and Melanchthon, Bucer, and Johann Pistorius on the Protestant side. The basis for discussion was the "Regensburg Book"—essentially the Worms Book with modifications by the papal legate, Gasparo Contarini, and other Catholic theologians. The two sides made a promising start, reaching agreement over the issue of justification by faith. But they could not agree on the teaching authority of the Church, the Protestants insisting it was the Bible, the Catholics the magisterium—in other words, the pope and his bishops. Into the article on the mass and the Lord's Supper, Contarini had inserted the concept of transubstantiation, which was also unacceptable to the Protestants. As a result, the colloquy became deadlocked. To salvage some of the agreements reached, Charles and Granvelle had the Regensburg Book reprinted with additional articles in which the Protestants were allowed to present their views. However, Luther in Wittenberg and the papal court in Rome had by this time seen the book, and they both publicly rejected the article on justification by faith. The failure of the conference was a major setback for Bucer.

After Bucer's return from Regensburg, the city of Strasbourg was struck by the plague. First, Bucer's friend and colleague Wolfgang Capito succumbed to the disease; then Bucer's wife Elisabeth died on 16 November 1541. How many children Elisabeth had borne is unknown; several died during child-birth or at a young age. One son, Nathanael, although mentally and physically handicapped, survived to adulthood and remained with the Bucer family throughout his life. During Elisabeth's final hours, she urged Bucer to marry Capito's widow, Wibrandis Rosenblatt, after her death. He married Rosenblatt on 16 April 1542, as her fourth husband—she had outlived Ludwig Keller, Johannes Oecolampadius, and Wolfgang Capito. She brought with her four children from her previous marriages. The new couple produced a daughter, whom they named Elisabeth.

== Reform in the Electorate of Cologne (1542–1547) ==
On 5 February 1542, Bucer and Gropper met with Hermann von Wied, archbishop-elector of Cologne, to discuss the introduction of church reform in his archdiocese. As one of the seven electors of the Holy Roman Empire, the archbishop of Cologne was a key political figure for both the emperor and the reformers. After consulting the territorial diet, the archbishop enlisted Bucer to lead the reform, and on 14 December Bucer moved to Bonn, the capital of the electorate. His selection caused consternation in the Cologne cathedral chapter, the clerics assisting the archbishop. The hostility of the clergy soon caused a rift between Bucer and Gropper. On 19 December, the chapter lodged a formal protest against Bucer's appointment, but von Wied supported his new protégé and Bucer was allowed to stay. He led a small congregation at Bonn cathedral, where he preached three times a week, although his main responsibility was to plan reform.

In January 1543, Bucer began work on a major document for von Wied, Einfältiges Bedenken, worauf eine christliche, im Worte Gottes gegründete Reformation ... anzurichten sei [Simple Consideration Concerning the Establishment of a Christian Reformation Founded upon God's Word] (in German). Melanchthon joined him in Bonn in May, and Caspar Hedio a month later, to help draft the document. At the beginning of July, Bucer discussed the draft with the archbishop, who, after studying it, submitted the document to the territorial diet on 23 July. Although the cathedral chapter flatly rejected it, the diet ruled in favour of the reform programme. The final document was over three hundred pages and covered a number of subjects on doctrine, church law, and liturgy. Some of the principles proposed include justification by faith, the acceptance of baptism and the Lord's Supper as the only valid sacraments, the offering of the cup to the laity, the holding of worship services in the vernacular, and the authorisation of priests to marry.

These first steps toward reform were halted on 17 August 1543 when Charles V and his troops entered Bonn. The emperor was engaged in a harsh campaign to assert his claim over lands contested by Wilhelm, Duke of Jülich-Cleves-Berg. Bucer was forced to return to Strasbourg shortly afterwards. When the anti-reformist Cologne cathedral chapter and the University of Cologne appealed to both emperor and pope for protection against their archbishop, Charles took their side. Bucer wrote several treatises defending von Wied's reformation plan, including a six-hundred-page book, Beständige Verantwortung (Steadfast Defence), but he was unable to influence the course of events. Von Wied was excommunicated on 16 April 1546, and he formally surrendered his electoral titles on 25 February 1547. Bucer's congregation in Bonn wrote to him in dismay at this disaster. Bucer reassured them that Christians who humble themselves before God eventually receive his protection.

== Rejecting the Augsburg Interim (1547–1549) ==
With the onset of the Schmalkaldic War in 1546, Protestants began a gradual retreat within the Empire. On 21 March 1547, Strasbourg surrendered to the imperial army, and the following month the decisive imperial victory at the Battle of Mühlberg ended most Protestant resistance. In Strasbourg, Bucer and his colleagues, including Matthew Zell, Paul Fagius and Johannes Marbach, continued to press the council to bring more discipline and independence to the church. Charles V overruled their efforts at the Diet of Augsburg, which sat from September 1547 to May 1548. The Diet produced an imperial decree, the provisional Augsburg Interim, which imposed Catholic rites and ceremonies throughout the Empire, with a few concessions to the Reformation. To make the document acceptable to the Protestants, Charles needed a leading figure among the reformers to endorse it, and he selected Bucer.

Bucer arrived in Augsburg on 30 March 1548 of his own volition. On 2 April, after he was shown the document, he announced his willingness to ratify it if certain changes were made; but the time for negotiations had passed, and Charles insisted on his signature. When he refused, he was placed under house arrest on 13 April, and shortly afterwards in close confinement. On 20 April, he signed the Interim and was immediately freed. (Note: According to Eells 1931, p. 394, rather than being freed immediately, he supposedly escaped and returned to Strasbourg.)

Despite this capitulation, Bucer continued to fight. On his return to Strasbourg, he stepped up his attacks on Catholic rites and ceremonies, and on 2 July published the Ein Summarischer vergriff der Christlichen Lehre und Religion [Concise Summary of Christian Doctrine and Religion] (in German), a confessional statement calling on Strasbourg to repent and to defend reformed principles outlined in twenty-nine articles. Charles ordered all copies destroyed. Tension grew in Strasbourg, as Bucer's opponents feared he was leading the city to disaster. Many Strasbourg merchants left to avoid a potential clash with imperial forces. On 30 August, the guild officials voted overwhelmingly to begin negotiations to introduce the Interim. Bucer stood firm; even after the city of Konstanz surrendered and accepted the Interim, he called for Strasbourg to reject it unconditionally. In January 1549, with plans underway for the implementation of the Interim in Strasbourg, Bucer and his colleagues continued to attack it, producing a memorandum on how to preserve the Protestant faith under its directives. With no significant support left, Bucer and Fagius were finally relieved of their positions and dismissed on 1 March 1549. Bucer left Strasbourg on 5 April a refugee, as he had arrived twenty-five years earlier.

== Exile in England (1549–1551) ==
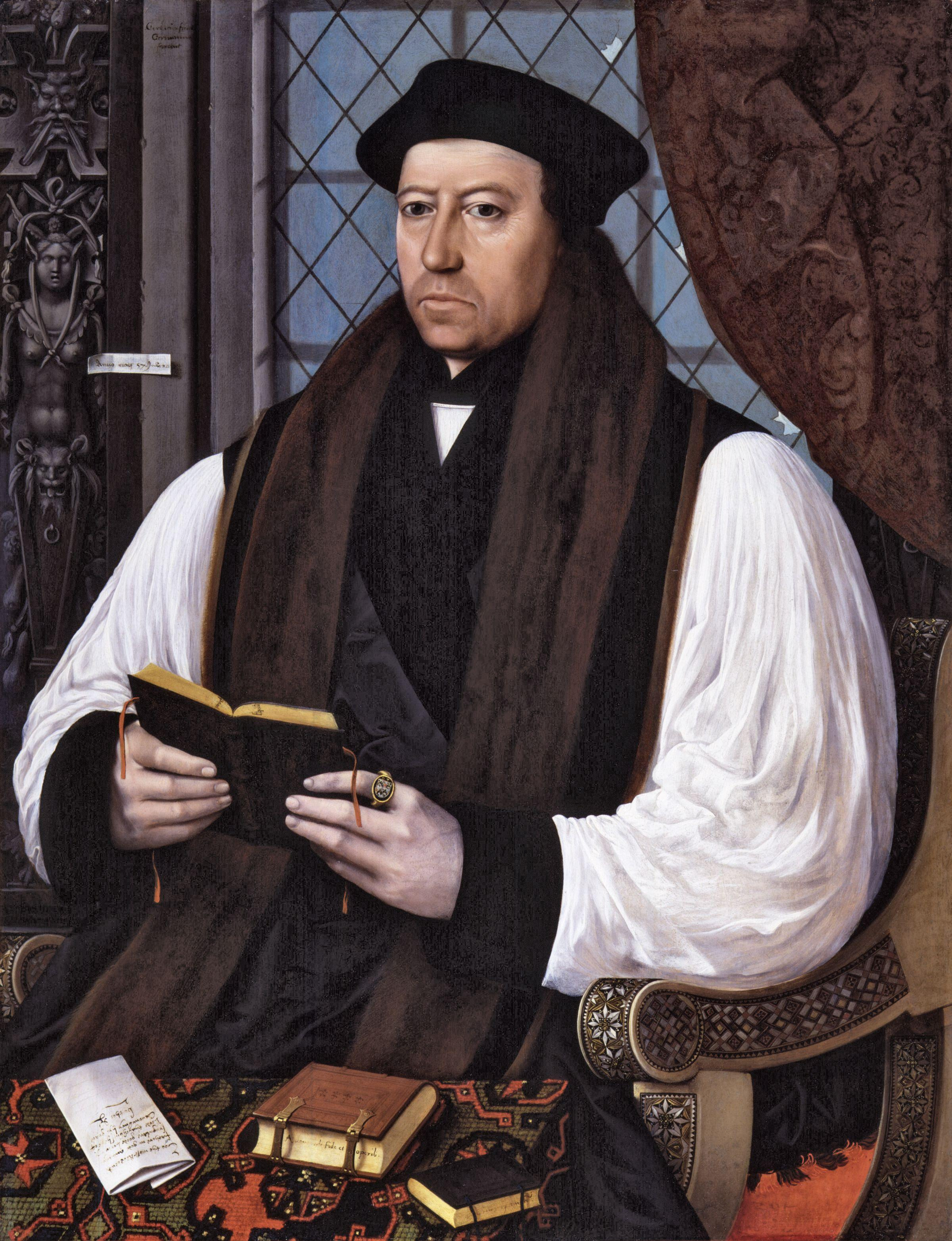
Thomas Cranmer gave Martin Bucer refuge in England, where he lived his final years.

Bucer received several offers of sanctuary, including Melanchthon's from Wittenberg and Calvin's from Geneva. He accepted Archbishop Thomas Cranmer's invitation to come to England; from his correspondence with several notable Englishmen, he believed that the English Reformation had advanced with some success. On 25 April 1549 Bucer, Fagius, and others arrived in London, where Cranmer received them with full honours. A few days later, Bucer and Fagius were introduced to Edward VI and his court. Bucer's wife Wibrandis and his stepdaughter Agnes Capito (daughter of Wolfgang Capito) joined him in September. The following year, Wibrandis arranged for the rest of her children and her elderly mother to come to England.

Bucer took the position of Regius Professor of Divinity at the University of Cambridge. In June he entered a controversy when Peter Martyr Vermigli, another refugee who had taken the equivalent Regius Professor position at Oxford University, debated with Catholic colleagues over the issue of the Lord's Supper. Martyr asked Bucer for his support, but Bucer did not totally agree with Martyr's position and thought that exposure of differences would not assist the cause of reform. Unwilling to see the eucharist conflict repeat itself in England, he told Martyr he did not take sides, Catholic, Lutheran, or Zwinglian. He said, "We must aspire with the utmost zeal to edify as many people as we possibly can in faith and in the love of Christ—and to offend no one."

In 1550, another conflict arose when John Hooper, the new bishop of Gloucester, refused to don the traditional vestments for his consecration. The vestments controversy pitted Cranmer, who supported the wearing of clerical garments, against Hooper, Martyr and Jan Laski, the pastor of the Stranger church in London. As it was known that Bucer had reformed the church services in Strasbourg to emulate the simplicity of the early church, Hooper expected Bucer's support. However, Bucer tried to stay out of the fray, arguing that there were more important issues to deal with—lack of pastors and pastoral care, the need for catechismal instruction, and the implementation of church discipline. Hooper refused to be swayed, and was imprisoned in the Tower of London until he accepted Cranmer's demand.

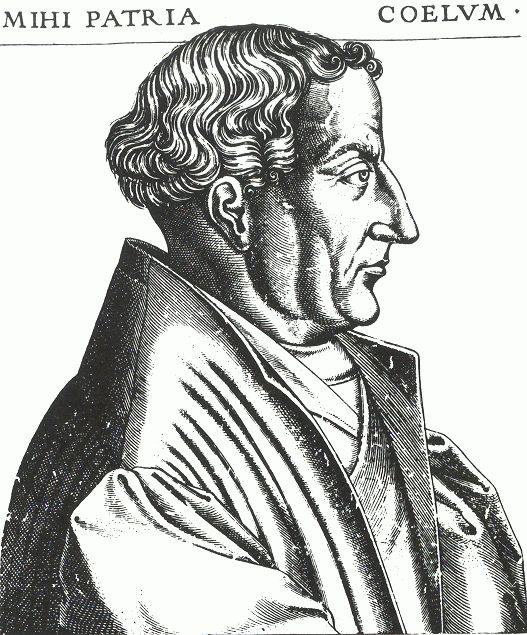
Boyvin, René, Martin Bucer at the age of 53 (engraving).

Bucer had ambitious goals in diffusing the Reformation throughout England. He was disappointed, therefore, when those in power failed to consult him in bringing about change. On learning about the custom of presenting a memorandum to the king every new year, he worked on a major treatise which he gave as a draft to his friend John Cheke on 21 October 1550. The De Regno Christi [On the Kingdom of Christ] was the culmination of Bucer's many years of experience, a summary of his thought and theology that he described as his legacy. In it he urged Edward VI to take control of the English Reformation, and proposed that Parliament introduce fourteen laws of reform, covering both ecclesiastical and civil matters. In his view the Reformation was not only concerned with the church, but in all areas of life. Noting the difficult social conditions in England, he promoted the role of deacons to care for the poor and needy. He described marriage as a social contract rather than a sacrament, hence he permitted divorce, a modern idea that was considered too advanced for its time. He advocated the restructuring of economic and administrative systems with suggestions for improving industry, agriculture, and education. His ideal society was distinctively authoritarian, with a strong emphasis on Christian discipline. The De Regno Christi was never to be the charter of the English Reformation that Bucer intended: it was finally printed not in England but in Basel, in 1557.

Bucer's last major contribution to the English Reformation was a treatise on the original 1549 edition of the Book of Common Prayer. Cranmer had requested his opinion on how the book should be revised, and Bucer submitted his response on 5 January 1551. He called for the simplification of the liturgy, noting non-essential elements: certain holidays in the liturgical calendar, actions of piety such as genuflections, and ceremonies such as private masses. He focused on the congregation and how the people would worship and be taught. How far Bucer's critique influenced the 1552 second edition of the Prayer Book is unknown. (Note: Eells and Greschat do not claim a direct connection between Bucer's recommendations and the 1552 Prayer Book. Hall, however, states that of fifty-eight points made by Bucer, nearly half were accepted for the new edition of the book. Eells and Hall note that the title of the treatise is Censura; Greschat notes that the title was not used until after Bucer's death.) Scholars agree that although Bucer's impact on the Church of England should not be overestimated, he exercised his greatest influence on the revision of the Prayer Book.

== Death ==
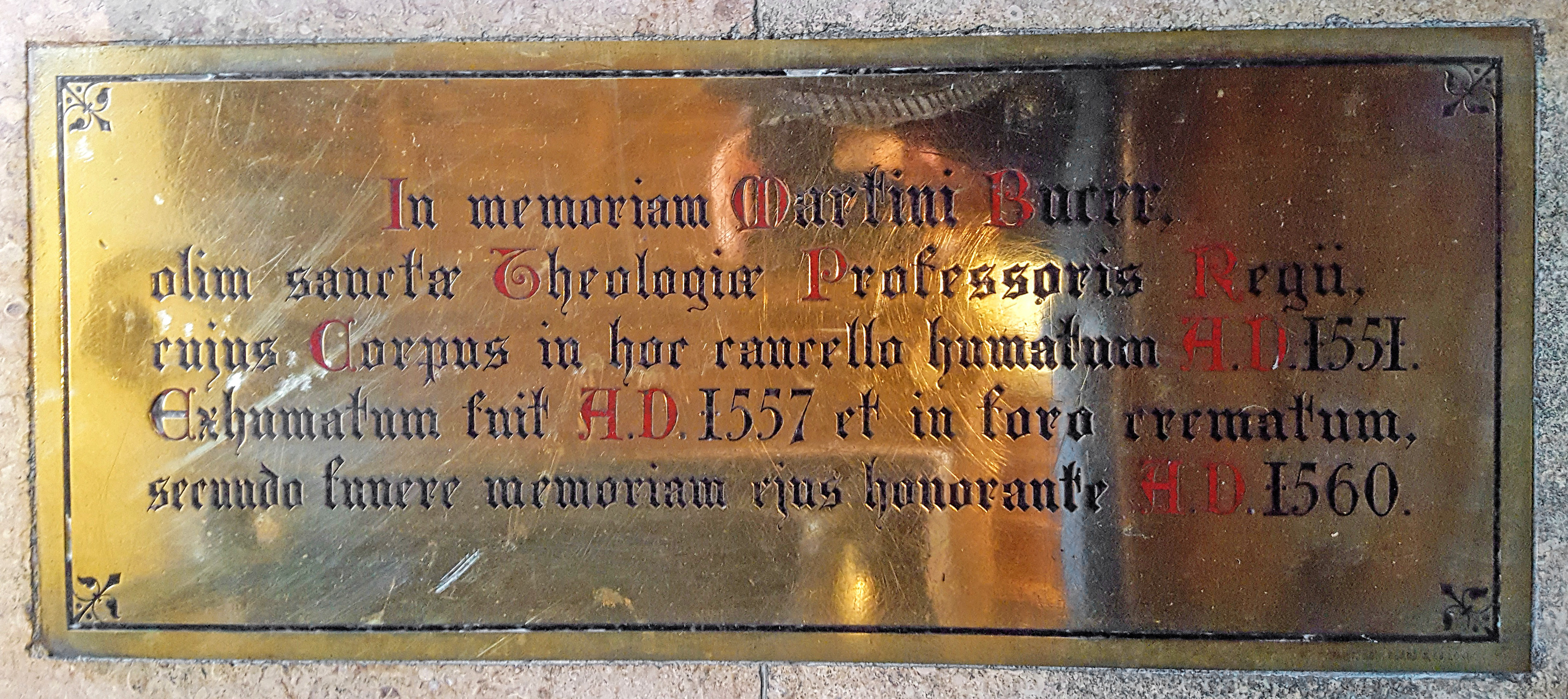
Plaque commemorating Martin Bucer in Great St Mary's, where he was buried.

Bucer's time in England was dogged by illnesses, including rheumatism, coughs, and intestinal ailments. Symptoms such as vomiting, shivering, and sweating suggest severe tuberculosis. In February 1551, his health finally broke down, and on the 22nd he dictated an addition to his will. He named Walter Haddon and Matthew Parker as executors, commended his loved ones to Thomas Cranmer, and thanked his stepdaughter Agnes Capito for taking care of him. On 28 February, after encouraging those near him to do all they could to realise his vision as expressed in De Regno Christi, he died at the age of 59. (Note: According to Eells, Bucer died on 1 March 1551, and he cites sources that support that date. However, he also notes that Beza and Edward VI mentioned the 28 February date. Selderhuis 1999, p. 115 also says he died on 1 March.) He was buried in the church of Great St Mary's in Cambridge before a large crowd of university professors and students.

In a letter to Peter Martyr, John Cheke wrote a fitting eulogy:

We are deprived of a leader than whom the whole world would scarcely obtain a greater, whether in knowledge of true religion or in integrity and innocence of life, or in thirst for study of the most holy things, or in exhausting labour in advancing piety, or in authority and fulness of teaching, or in anything that is praiseworthy and renowned.

Bucer left his wife Wibrandis a significant inheritance consisting mainly of the household and his large collection of books. She eventually returned to Basel, where she died on 1 November 1564 at the age of 60.

== Legacy ==
When Mary I came to the throne, she had Bucer and Fagius tried posthumously for heresy as part of her efforts to restore Catholicism in England. Their caskets were disinterred and their remains burned, along with copies of their books. On 22 July 1560, Elizabeth I formally rehabilitated both reformers. A brass plaque on the floor of Great St Mary's marks the original location of Bucer's grave.

After Bucer's death, his writings continued to be translated, reprinted, and disseminated throughout Europe. No "Buceran" denomination, however, emerged from his ministry, probably because he never developed a systematic theology as Melanchthon had for the Lutheran church and Calvin for the Reformed churches. Several groups, including Anglicans, Puritans, Lutherans, and Calvinists, claimed him as one of their own. The adaptability of his theology to each confessional point-of-view also led polemicists to criticise it as too accommodating. His theology could be best summarised as being practical and pastoral rather than theoretical. Bucer was not so concerned about staking a doctrinal claim per se, but rather he took a standpoint in order to discuss and to win over his opponents. At the same time his theological stand was grounded in the conditions of his time where he envisioned the ideal society to be one that was led by an enlightened, God-centred government with all the people united under Christian fellowship. Martin Bucer is chiefly remembered for his promotion of doctrinal unity, or ecumenism, and his lifelong struggle to create an inclusive church.

== See also ==
- Judgement of Martin Bucer Concerning Divorce
- Hochstratus Ovans

== Sources ==
- Augustijn, Cornelis (1994), "Bucer's ecclesiology in the colloquies with the Catholics, 1540–41", in Wright, DF (ed.), Martin Bucer: Reforming church and community, Cambridge: Cambridge University Press, pp. 107–21, ISBN 0-521-39144-X.
- Bainton, Roland H. (1995), Here I Stand: A Life of Martin Luther, New York: Meridian, ISBN 0-452-01146-9.
- Brecht, Martin (1993), Martin Luther: the Preservation of the Church, 1532–1546, Minneapolis: Fortress Press, ISBN 0-8006-2704-0.
- Collinson, Patrick (2003), The Reformation, London: Phoenix, ISBN 0-7538-1863-9.
- Dickens, AG (1974), The German Nation and Martin Luther, London: Edward Arnold, ISBN 0-7131-5700-3.
- Eells, Hastings (1931), Martin Bucer, New Haven, CT: Yale University Press, OCLC 639395.
- Eire, Carlos MN (1989), War Against the Idols: The Reformation of Worship from Erasmus to Calvin, Cambridge: Cambridge University Press, ISBN 0-521-37984-9.
- Greschat, Martin (2004), Martin Bucer: A Reformer and His Times, Louisville, KY: Westminster John Knox Press, ISBN 0-664-22690-6. Translated from Martin Bucer: Ein Reformator und seine Zeit (in German), Munich: CH Beck, 1990.
- Hall, Basil (1994), "Martin Bucer in England", in Wright, DF (ed.), Martin Bucer: Reforming church and community, Cambridge: Cambridge University Press, ISBN 0-521-39144-X.
- Hughes, Michael (1992), Early Modern Germany, 1477–1806, London: MacMillan, ISBN 0-333-53774-2.
- Kittelson, James (1994), "Martin Bucer and the ministry of the church", in Wright, DF (ed.), Martin Bucer: Reforming church and community, Cambridge: Cambridge University Press, ISBN 0-521-39144-X.
- MacCulloch, Diarmaid (2003), Reformation: Europe's House Divided, 1490–1700, London: Allen Lane, ISBN 0-7139-9370-7.
- Matheson, Peter (1994), "Martin Bucer and the Old Church", in Wright, DF (ed.), Martin Bucer: Reforming church and community, Cambridge: Cambridge University Press, ISBN 0-521-39144-X.
- Pauck, Wilhelm (1929), "Calvin and Butzer", The Journal of Religion, 9 (2), Chicago: The University of Chicago Press: 237–256, doi:10.1086/480825, S2CID 170560215.
- Selderhuis, HJ (1999), Marriage and Divorce in the Thought of Martin Bucer, Kirksville, MO: Thomas Jefferson University Press, ISBN 0-943549-68-X. Translated from Huwelijk en Echtscheiding bij Martin Bucer (in Dutch), Leiden: Uitgeverij JJ Groen en Zoon BV, 1994.
- Thompson, Nicholas (2004), Eucharistic Sacrifice and Patristic Tradition in the Theology of Martin Bucer 1534–1546, Leiden, NL: Koninklijke Brill, ISBN 90-04-14138-3.
- Trocmé-Latter, Daniel (2015), The Singing of the Strasbourg Protestants, 1523–1541, Farnham: Ashgate.
- van 't Spijker, Willem (1994), "Bucer's influence on Calvin: church and community", in Wright, DF (ed.), Martin Bucer: Reforming church and community, Cambridge: Cambridge University Press, ISBN 0-521-39144-X.

Academic offices
Preceded by John Madew	Regius Professor of Divinity at Cambridge; 1550–1551	Succeeded by John Young
