= Wibrandis Rosenblatt =

Swiss theologian

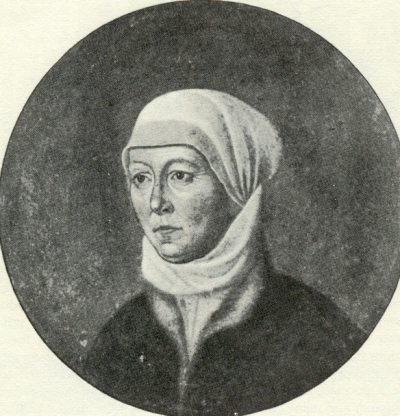
- Born: 1504; Bad Säckingen
- Died: 1564 (aged 59–60); Basel
- Occupation: Theologian

Wibrandis Rosenblatt (1504–1564) was the wife of three major religious reformers, who predeceased her: Johannes Oecolampadius (married, 1528–1531), Wolfgang Capito (married, 1532–1541), and Martin Bucer (married, 1542–1551).

== Family life ==
Rosenblatt was born in 1504 in Bad Säckingen and raised in Basel.

She first married a young scholar and humanist named Ludwig Keller (married, 1524-1526), with whom she had one daughter. Keller died in 1528, and she married Oecolampadius later that year.

She had three children with Oecolampadius, two of whom died in childhood. After Oecolampadius died in 1531, she married his friend Capito (who was also newly widowed) and moved to Strasbourg. She had five children with Capito, but he and several of their children died in the plague of 1541. Rosenblatt's friend Elisabeth Bucer also died in the same plague, but before she died asked her widowed friend to marry her own husband. Rosenblatt married Bucer in 1542, and had two children with him (they did not survive to adulthood). She joined him in his exile to England in 1549.

She was in all the mother of 11 children, and also cared for other children and relatives in her four husbands' households.

After Bucer died she returned to Basel, where she died of bubonic plague in 1564.
