= Martin Cellarius =

German theologian (1499–1564)

Martin Borrhaus (Latin: Martin Cellarius) (1499 – 11 October 1564) was a German Protestant theologian and reformer.

== Life ==
Borrhaus was born in Stuttgart and raised as an adopted child of a Simon Keller. He enrolled at the University of Tübingen, where in 1515 he graduated and came to know Philipp Melanchthon. In 1520, he moved to the University of Ingolstadt, where he took up the study of Greek and Hebrew, and theology under Johann Eck. Following a dispute with Eck, he left for Wittenberg, where he taught mathematics at the private school of Melanchthon. However his ideas became more radical, and he was expelled for heterodoxy in April 1522. Borrhaus travelled in the company of Felix Manz through Switzerland, Austria, Poland and Prussia. In 1526, he moved to Strasbourg, where he married Odilia of Utenheim. Under the influence of Wolfgang Capito, Borrhaus published his first work, "De operibus Dei" 1527. In 1536, his wife died and Borrhaus went to Basel, where he earned a living as a glass blower and married again. In 1541, his friend Simon Grynaeus arranged for Borrhaus a position teaching philosophy at the University of Basel, and then in 1544 he became professor of Old Testament and 1546, 1553 and 1564 served as rector. He died in Basel.

Borrhaus associated with the advocates of tolerance Sebastian Castellio, Celio Secondo Curione and Michael Servetus. At this point he openly rejected infant baptism. His views on the Trinity were less open in his later years, not surprisingly, given the death by burning of Servetus in 1553.

== Works ==
- De operibus Dei (1527) – the first open questioning of the doctrine of the Trinity in print anywhere in Europe, and the first openly millenarian work in Martin Luther's circle. The combination of Arianism and Millenarianism led Giorgio Biandrata and Francis David in Transylvania to regard Borrhaus as the first precursor of Unitarian belief, and David published key extracts of De operibus Dei with his own writings.
