= Marburg Colloquy =

1529 meeting of Protestant theologians

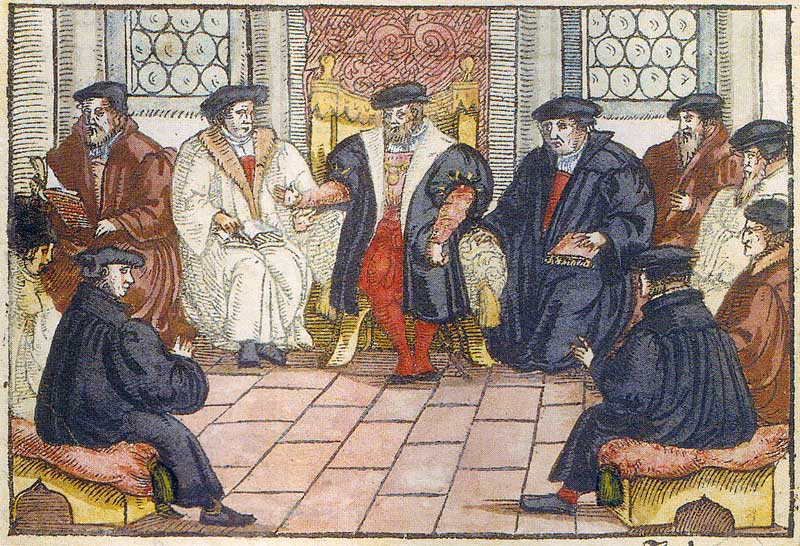
Anonymous woodcut, 1557

The Marburg Colloquy was a meeting at Marburg Castle, Marburg, Hesse, Germany, which attempted to solve a disputation between Martin Luther and Ulrich Zwingli over the Real Presence of Christ in the Eucharist. It took place between 1 October and 4 October 1529. The leading Protestant reformers of the time attended at the behest of Philip I of Hessen. Philip's primary motivation for this conference was political; he wished to unite the Protestant states in political alliance, and to this end, religious harmony was an important consideration.

After the Diet of Speyer had confirmed the edict of Worms, Philip I felt the need to reconcile the diverging views of Martin Luther and Ulrich Zwingli in order to develop a unified Protestant theology. Besides Luther and Zwingli, the reformers Stephan Agricola, Johannes Brenz, Martin Bucer, Caspar Hedio, Justus Jonas, Philip Melanchthon, Johannes Oecolampadius, Andreas Osiander, and Bernhard Rothmann participated in the meeting.

Both Luther and Zwingli renounced transubstantiation as well as the belief that the eucharist was a sacrifice for the living and the dead, and they insisted on communion in both kinds of Christ. The meeting ultimately failed to unify the Protestant movement, with both sides being unable to come to an agreement as to whether or not Christ's body and blood are present in the Eucharist.

== Background ==
Philip of Hesse had a political motivation to unify all the leading Protestants because he believed that as a divided entity they were vulnerable to Charles V. As a unified force, they would appear to be more powerful. Religious harmony was vital amongst the Protestants for there to be a unification.

== Participants ==
Main participants

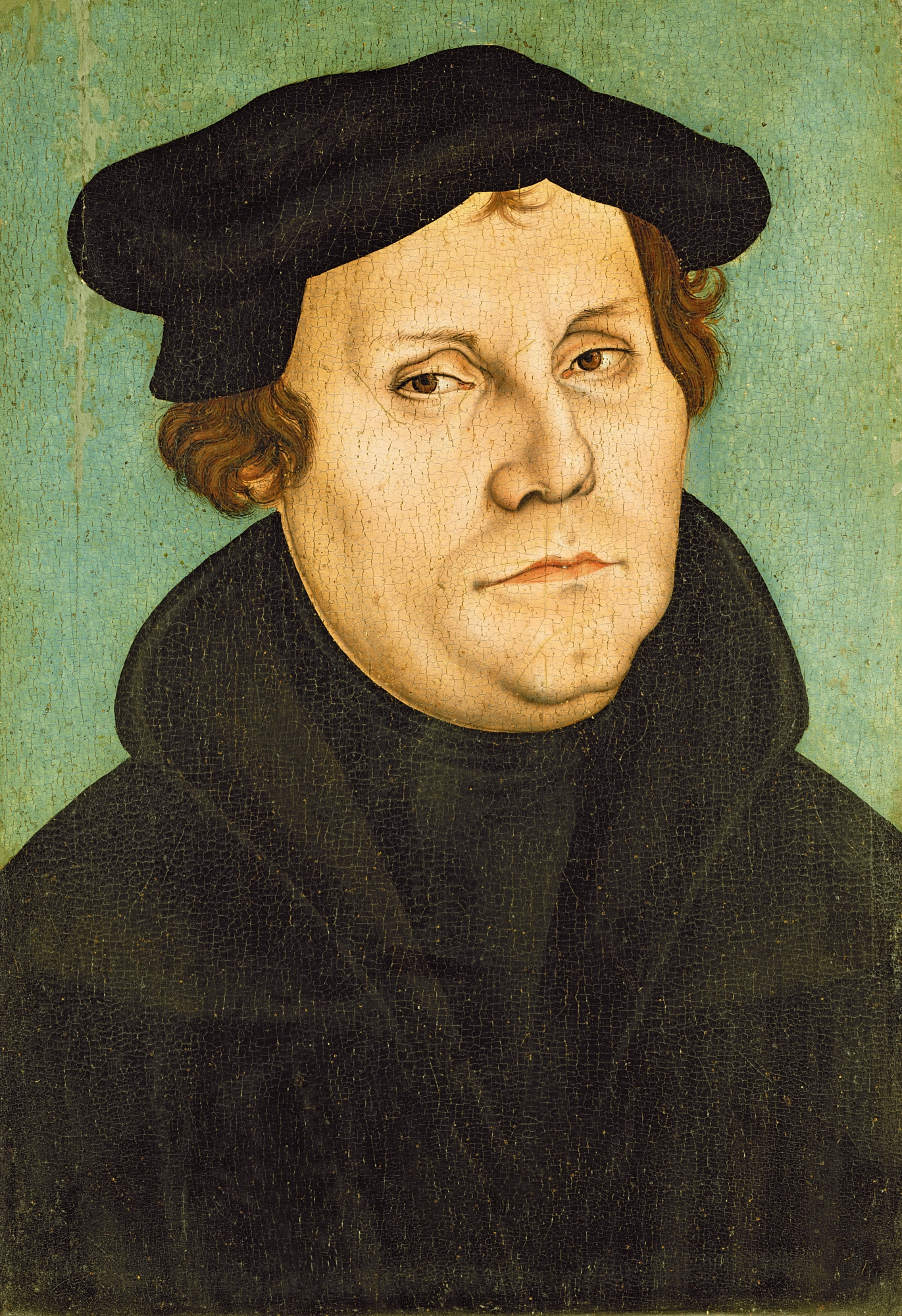
Martin Luther

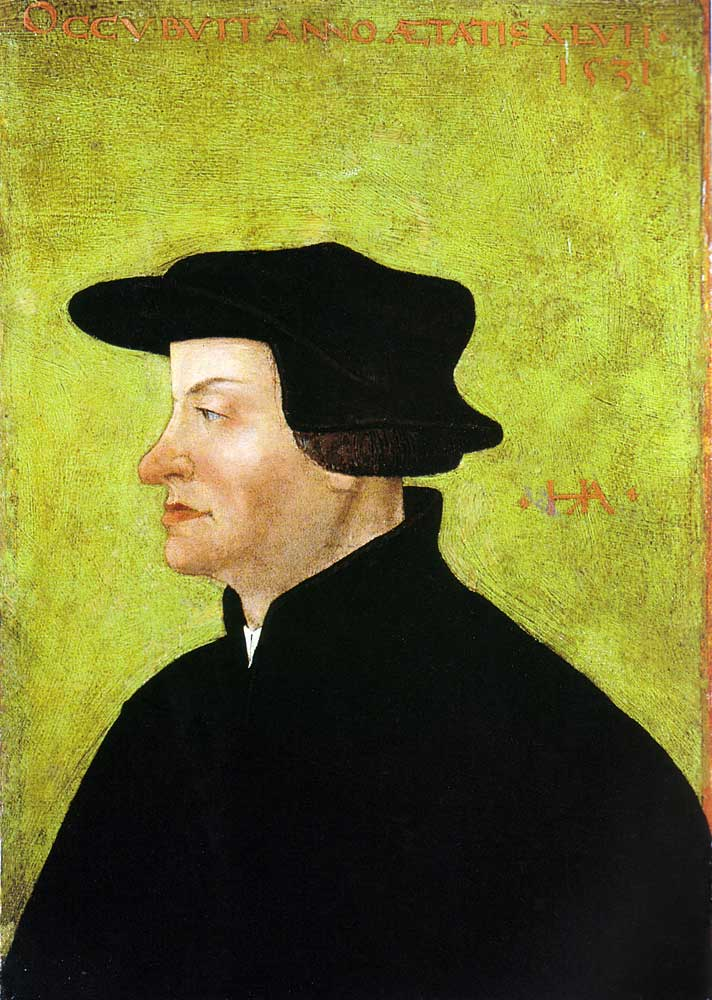
Huldrych Zwingli

Other participants (not all)

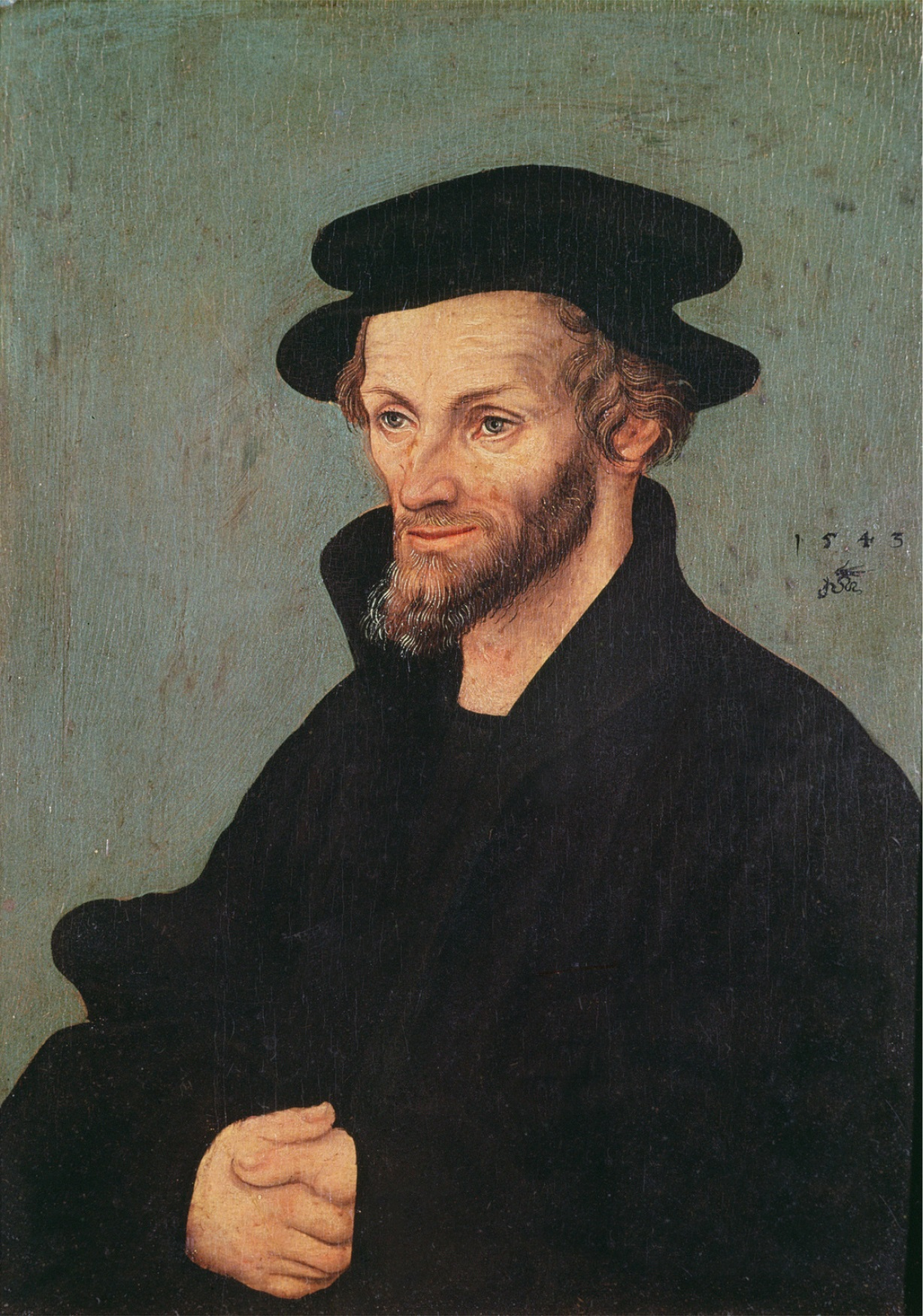
Philipp Melanchthon, born as Philipp Schwartzerdt

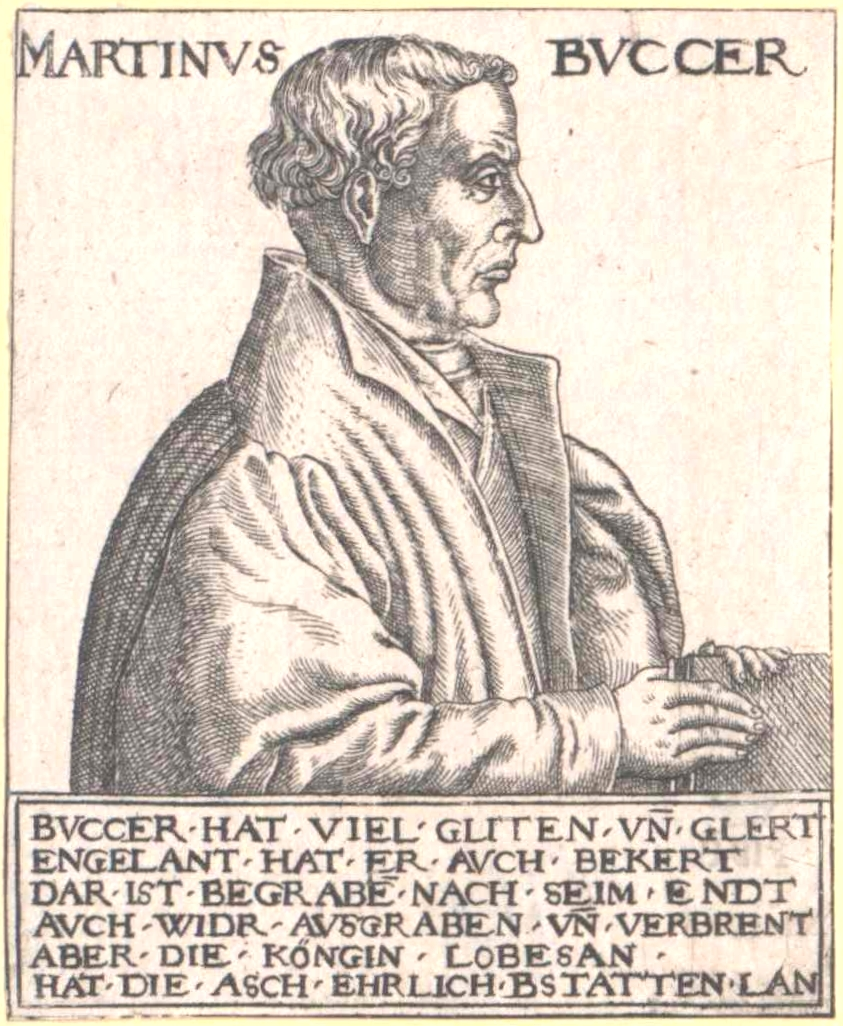
Martin Bucer

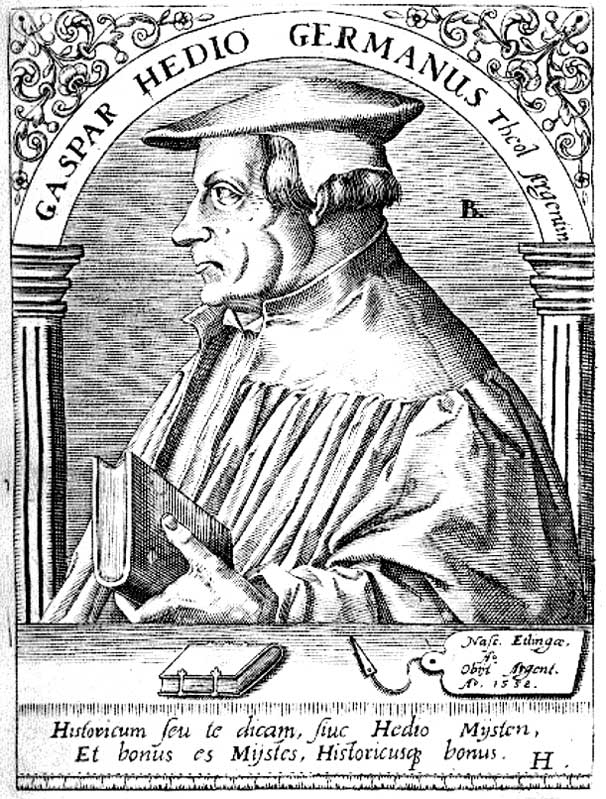
Caspar Hedio

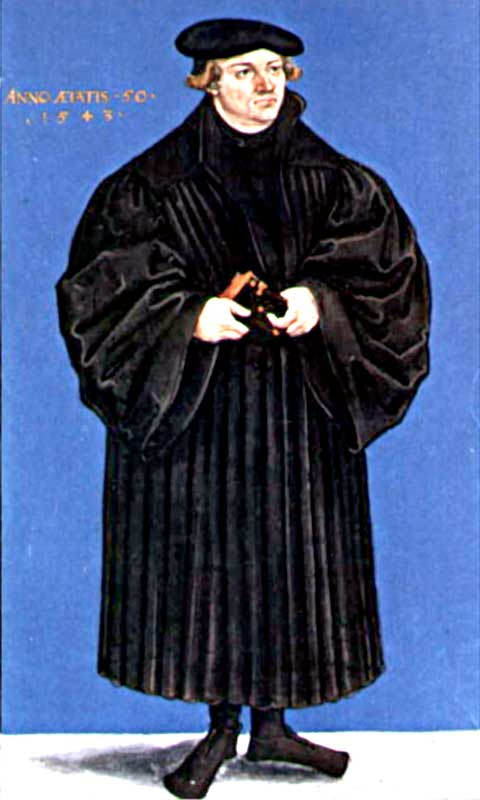
Justus Jonas

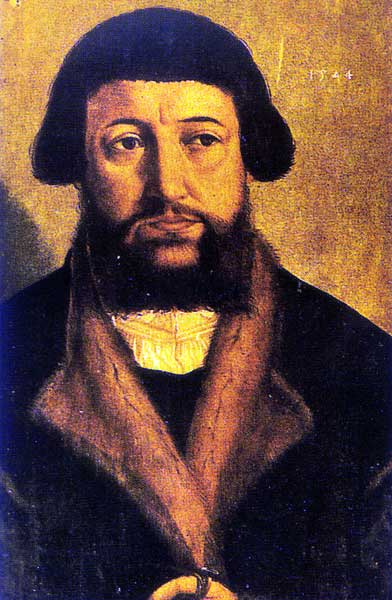
Andreas Osiander

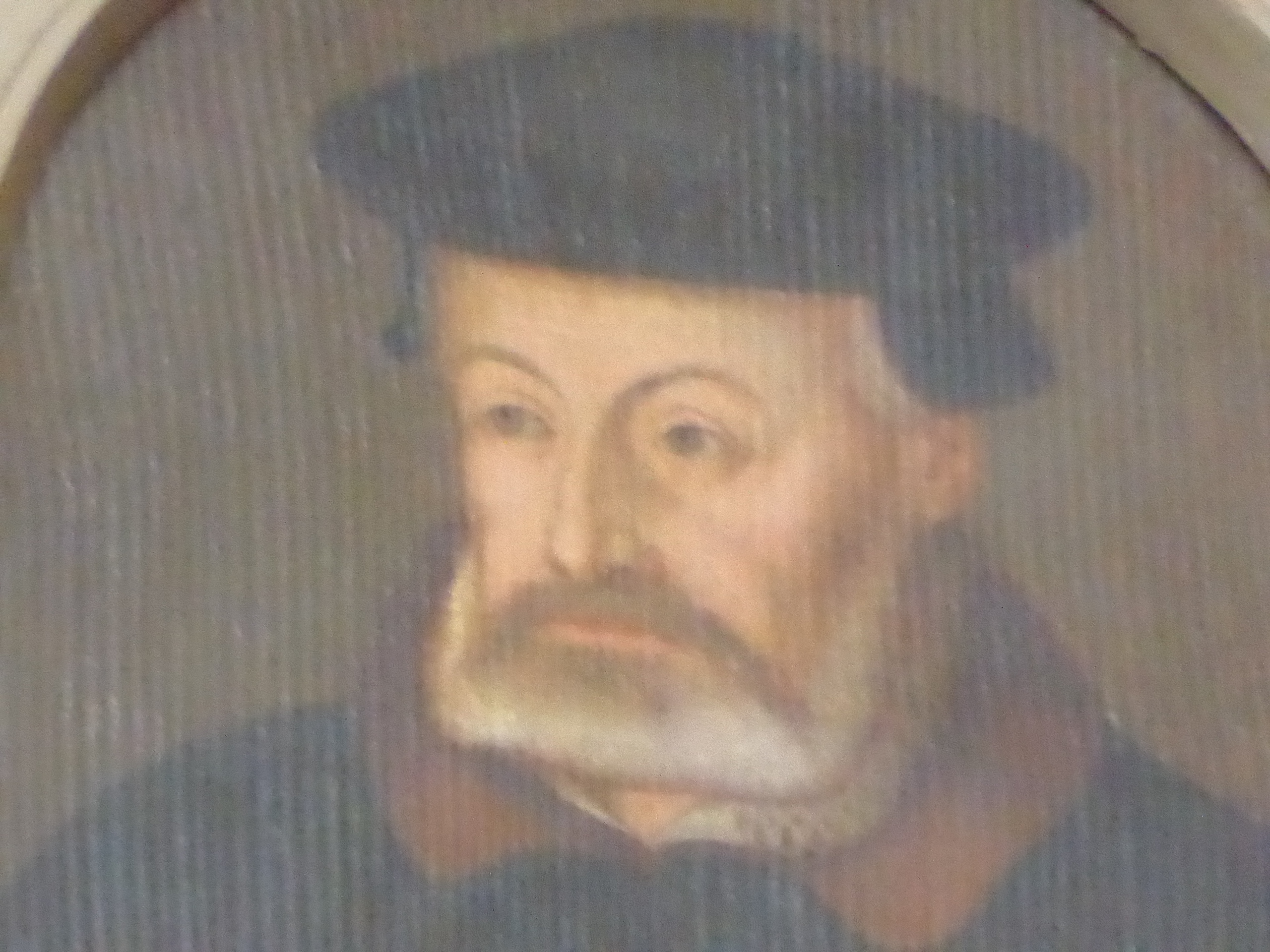
Johannes Brenz

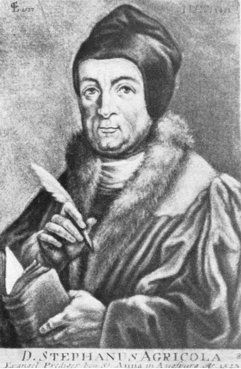
Stephan Agricola

== The colloquy ==
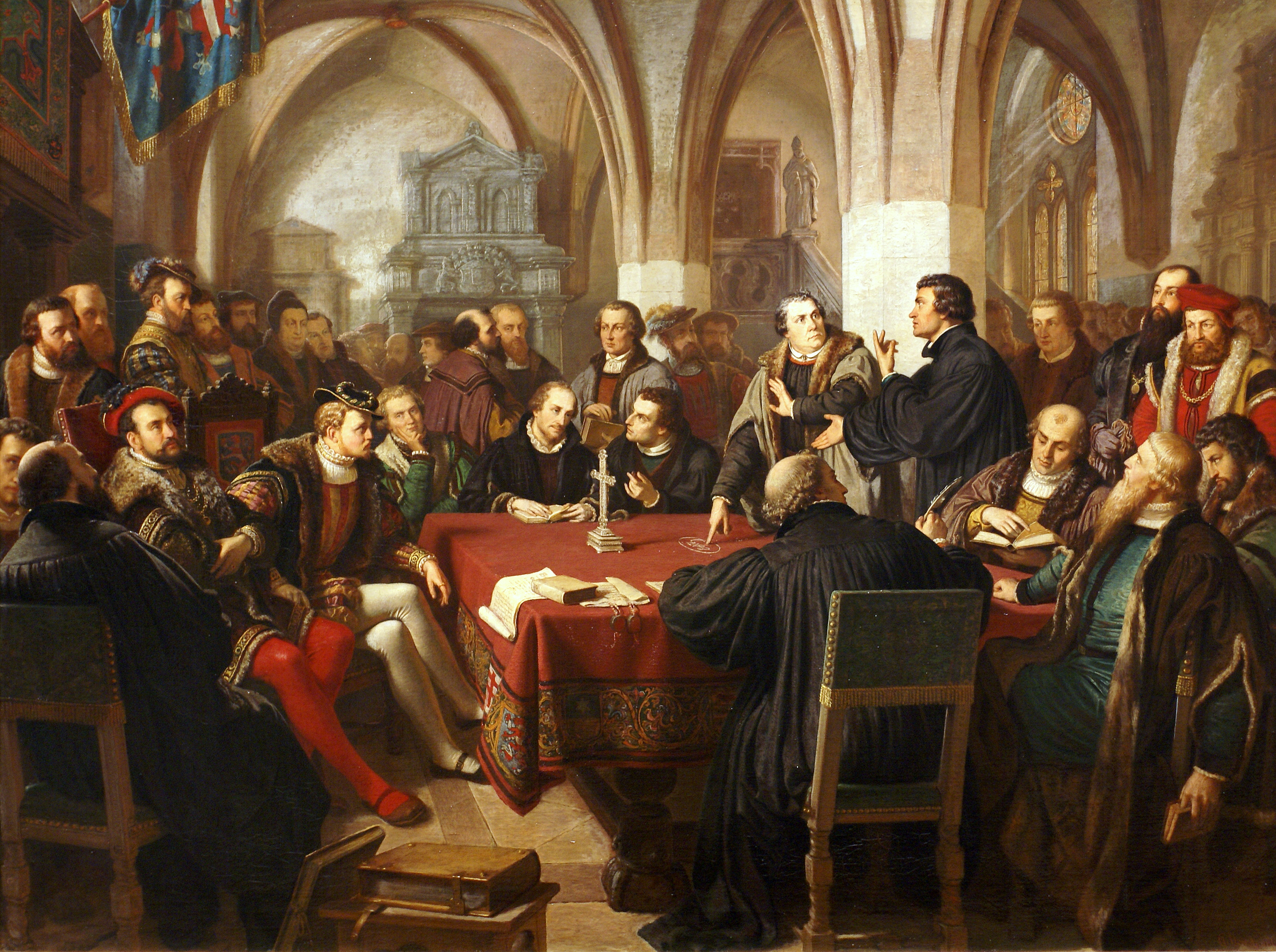
The Marburg Colloquy

Although the two prominent reformers, Luther and Zwingli, found a consensus on fourteen theological points, they could not find agreement on the fifteenth point pertaining to the Eucharist. Timothy George, an author and professor of Church History, summarized the incompatible views, "On this issue, they parted without having reached an agreement. Both Luther and Zwingli agreed that the bread in the Supper was a sign. For Luther, however, that which the bread signified, namely the body of Christ, was present "in, with, and under" the sign itself. For Zwingli, though, sign and thing signified were separated by a distance—the width between heaven and earth."

Underlying this disagreement was their theology of Christ. Luther began by arguing that the phrase “this is my body” cannot be understood in any other way than as written in the Bible. He believed that the human body of Christ was ubiquitous (present in all places) and so present in the bread and wine. This was possible because the attributes of God infused Christ's human nature. Luther emphasized the oneness of Christ's person. While Luther stated that Christ is present in the Eucharist for all recipients, Zwingli maintained Christ’s presence is only in the hearts of believers. Zwingli, who emphasized the distinction of the natures, believed that while Christ in his deity was omnipresent, Christ's human body could only be present in one place, that is, at the right hand of the Father. The executive editor for Christianity Today magazine carefully detailed the two views that would forever divide the Lutheran and Reformed view of the Supper:

Luther claimed that the body of Christ was not eaten in a gross, material way but rather in some mysterious way, which is beyond human understanding. Yet, Zwingli replied, if the words were taken in their literal sense, the body had to be eaten in the most grossly material way. "For this is the meaning they carry: this bread is that body of mine which is given for you. It was given for us in grossly material form, subject to wounds, blows and death. As such, therefore, it must be the material of the supper." Indeed, to press the literal meaning of the text even farther, it follows that Christ would have again to suffer pain, as his body was broken again—this time by the teeth of communicants. Even more absurdly, Christ’s body would have to be swallowed, digested, even eliminated through the bowels! Such thoughts were repulsive to Zwingli. They smacked of cannibalism on the one hand and of the pagan mystery religions on the other. The main issue for Zwingli, however, was not the irrationality or exegetical fallacy of Luther’s views. It was rather that Luther put "the chief point of salvation in physically eating the body of Christ," for he connected it with the forgiveness of sins. The same motive that had moved Zwingli so strongly to oppose images, the invocation of saints, and baptismal regeneration was present also in the struggle over the Supper: the fear of idolatry. Salvation was by Christ alone, through faith alone, not through faith and bread. The object of faith was that which is not seen (Heb 11:1) and which therefore cannot be eaten except, again, in a nonliteral, figurative sense. "Credere est edere," said Zwingli: "To believe is to eat." To eat the body and to drink the blood of Christ in the Supper, then, simply meant to have the body and blood of Christ present in the mind.

Near the end of the colloquy when it was clear an agreement would not be reached, Philipp asked Luther to draft a list of doctrines that both sides agreed upon. The Marburg Articles, based on what would become the Articles of Schwabach, had 15 points, and every person at the colloquy could agree on the first 14. The 15th article of the Marburg Articles reads:

Fifteenth, regarding the Last Supper of our dear Lord Jesus Christ, we believe and hold that one should practice the use of both species as Christ himself did, and that the sacrament at the altar is a sacrament of the true body and blood of Jesus Christ and the spiritual enjoyment of this very body and blood is proper and necessary for every Christian. Furthermore, that the practice of the sacrament is given and ordered by God the Almighty like the Word, so that our weak conscience might be moved to faith through the Holy Spirit. And although we have not been able to agree at this time, whether the true body and blood of Christ are corporally present in the bread and wine [of communion], each party should display towards the other Christian love, as far as each respective conscience allows, and both should persistently ask God the Almighty for guidance so that through his Spirit he might bring us to a proper understanding.

The failure to find agreement resulted in strong emotions on both sides. "When the two sides departed, Zwingli cried out in tears, 'There are no people on earth with whom I would rather be at one than the [Lutheran] Wittenbergers.'" Because of the differences, Luther initially refused to acknowledge Zwingli and his followers as Christians, though following the colloquy the two Reformers showed relatively more mutual respect in their writings.

== Aftermath ==
At the later Diet of Augsburg, the Zwinglians and Lutherans again explored the same territory as that covered in the Marburg Colloquy and presented separate statements which showed the differences in opinion.

== See also ==
- First War of Kappel (1529)
