= Wolfgang Capito =

German Protestant reformer

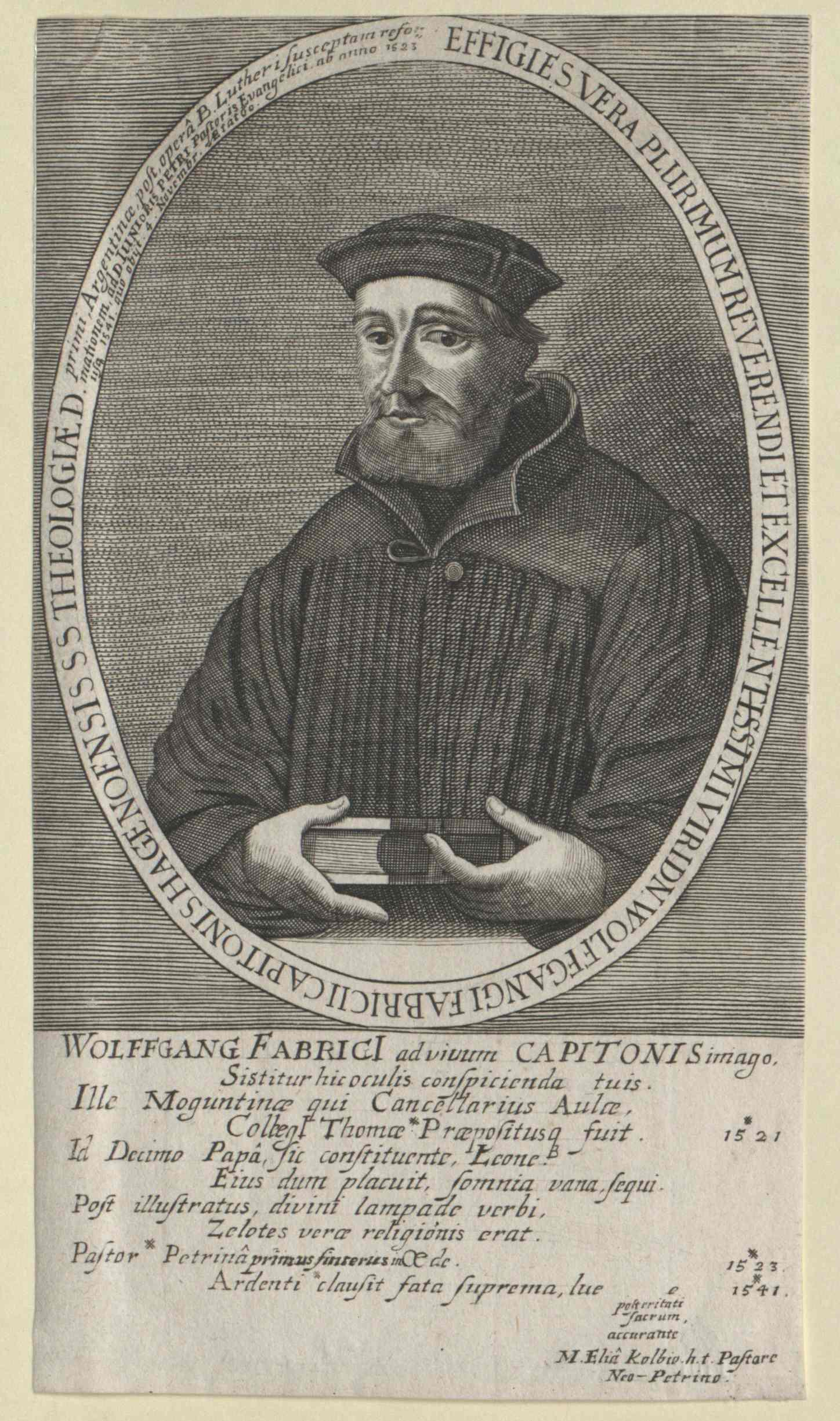
Wolfgang Capito

Wolfgang Fabricius Capito (also Koepfel) (c. 1478 – November 1541) was an Alsatian Protestant reformer in the Reformed tradition.

== His life and revolutionary work ==
Capito was born circa 1478 to a smith at Hagenau in Alsace. He attended the famous Latin school in Pforzheim, where his friend Philip Melanchthon studied.

He was educated for the medical profession but also studied law. He received a doctorate in theology at Freiburg. Having joined the Benedictines, taught for some time at Freiburg. He acted for three years as pastor in Bruchsal. In 1516 he became cathedral preacher of Basel Minster. Here he made the acquaintance of Zwingli and began to correspond with Luther. He persuaded Johann Froben to publish a collection of Luther's works in 1518.

In 1519, he removed to Mainz at the request of Albrecht, archbishop of that city, who soon made him his chancellor. In 1523 he settled at Strasbourg, where he remained until his death in November 1541. He had found it increasingly difficult to reconcile the new religion with the old, and from 1524 was one of the leaders of the reformed faith in Strasbourg. He took a prominent part in the earlier ecclesiastical transactions of the 16th century, was present at the second conference of Zürich and at the conference of Marburg, and along with Martin Bucer drew up the Confessio Tetrapolitana.

Capito was always more concerned for the "unity of the spirit" than for dogmatic formularies, and from his endeavours to conciliate the Lutheran and Zwinglian parties in regard to the sacraments, he seems to have incurred the suspicions of his own friends; while from his intimacy with Martin Cellarius and other divines of the Socinian school he drew on himself the charge of Arianism.

In 1532, Capito married Wibrandis Rosenblatt, the widow of Oecolampadius. After Wolfgang Capito's death, she married Martin Bucer.

Capito died in Strasbourg.

== Works ==
His principal works were:

- Institutionum Hebraicarum libri duo
- Enarrationes in Habacuc et Hoseam Prophetas
- a life of Oecolampadius and an account of the synod of Bern (1532)
- a Greek version of the Iliad in which he refers to himself as volfivs cephalaevs or wolfius cephalaeus

== See also ==
- Hochstratus Ovans
