= Joachim Mörlin =

German Evangelical Lutheran theologian

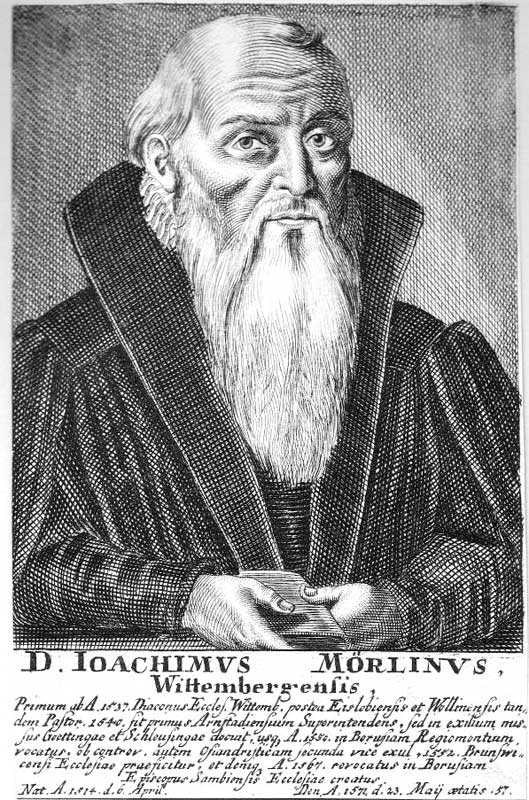
Joachim Mörlin

Joachim Mörlin (5 April 1514, in Wittenberg, Electorate of Saxony – 29 May 1571, in Königsberg, Duchy of Prussia (now Kaliningrad in Russia) - 1945) was an Evangelical Lutheran theologian and an important figure in the controversies following Martin Luther's (1483-1546) death. He was the older brother of Maximilian Mörlin, another Lutheran theologian and Reformer.

== Early life ==
Mörlin was born at Wittenberg, where his father, Jodok Mörlin, also known as Jodocus Morlinus, was the Professor of Philosophy at the University of Wittenberg. Joachim himself studied at the same University under Luther, Philipp Melanchthon, Justus Jonas, and Casper Cruciger the Elder from 1532 to 1536. After a brief residence at Coburg, he returned to Wittenberg and in 1539 became Luther's chaplain, declining a call to succeed Poliander at Königsberg. While a true pupil of Luther, Mörlin was more influenced by the dogmatics of Melanchthon, though devoid of sympathy with the Philippistic efforts for union with the Reformed.

On 22 September 1540 Joachim left Wittenberg to become superintendent at Arnstadt, where, until deposed in March 1543 for his rigid discipline and opposition to union, he displayed great activity, moral earnestness, and courage. But neither the appeal of his congregation nor the sympathy of Luther could overcome the hostility of the Count of Schwartzburg, Günther XL.

On 10 May 1544 Mörlin became superintendent at Göttingen. Here he was equally firm in insistence on purity of life and doctrine, and wrote his Enchiridion catecheticum (1544), taught rhetoric in the Latin school, and lectured on Erasmus and the Loci of Melanchthon. Mörlin's activity in Göttingen came to an end with his uncompromising resistance to the union advocated by the Interim. On 17 January 1550, after vain protests by both council and congregation to the Duke of Brunswick-Lüneburg, Eric II, Mörlin was dismissed from office.

Mörlin went to Erfurt, thence to Arnstadt, and finally to Schleusingen, where he lived and preached in the castle of William IV, the Count of Henneberg. Yet even here Mörlin was not altogether safe, and on 25 August 1550 he left Schleusingen, arriving at Königsberg on 13 September. There, since Prussia did not belong constitutionally to the Holy Roman Empire, he could not be molested, and on 27 September 1550 was appointed pastor at the Kneiphöfer Dom and inspector.

== Controversy with Osiander ==
There Mörlin became involved in the Osiandrian controversy, for it was not in his nature to remain neutral. However, the break between Mörlin and Osiander was gradual. When the latter defended his view of justification (act. 24, 1550), Mörlin remained a silent witness; but Osiander's work with on the incarnation and the image of God, and still more his Bericht und Trostschrift, with its savage attack on Melanchthon, led Mörlin to complain, on 7 February 1551, to Albert of Prussia, though he did this so delicately that the duke commissioned him and Aurifaber, Osiander's son-in-law, to assemble the theologians for the conference which was held on 13–17 February. Here Mörlin's sincere desire for peace was evident, but his suspicion of Osiander increased, even though the latter claimed to be in harmony with Luther, denying the truth of Mörlin's Antilogia seu contraria doctrina inter Lutherum et Osiandrum. On 19 April Mörlin preached against those who depreciated the merits of Christ, and Osiander rightly took this as directed against himself.

The breach was now complete, and after an interchange of recriminations, Mörlin was replaced by Stancarus, professor of Hebrew. Before a new colloquy could be held, however, the duke directed (on 8 May) first Osiander and then his opponents to present their views in writing. Osiander hesitated, and Mörlin attacked him from the pulpit (on 27 May). The duke now forced Mörlin to defend his tenets in writing, and further roused him and his followers to passionate resistance by appointing Osiander to administer the bishopric of Samland, and by requiring Mörlin and others to submit to the decision of the church. The characteristic reply (on 21 July) was that Mörlin and his adherents refused to recognize Osiander's jurisdiction, since he was a heretic, and they appealed to a free synod. Osiander's opponents now continued their attacks and virtually met up a separate church. This was forbidden by the duke (on 12 August), who sent them Osiander's confession of faith, which was returned unread.

The polemics still continued, and Albert in despair sent Osiander's confession to the princes and cities of Germany, urging a synod. Mörlin's position was gaining strength in Prussia, and the majority of the opinions of the churches outside Prussia were also favorable to him. The very refusal of the duke to publish these condemnations of Osiander aided Mörlin, who, on 23 May 1552, published a polemic defending the doctrine of justification against his opponent, in which he clearly set forth the orthodox Wittenberg position, and emphasized the difference between it and Osiander's teaching. Besides continuing to urge the publication of the opinions just mentioned, Mörlin preached a sermon (June 1552) directed against Osiander, deprecating speculations on the inscrutable essence of God; and Osiander replied with his impassioned Schmeckbier, in which he arraigned Mörlin and his friends.

The controversy increased in pettiness and coarseness, until Albert threatened (on 15 July 1552) to depose Mörlin, only to receive the respectful but firm reply that Mörlin held it his divinely commissioned duty to polemize against Osiander. Meanwhile, a second opinion came from Württemberg, and from it both Osiander and Mörlin claimed the support of Johann Brenz, but on 17 October 1552 the weary struggle found its end in the death of Osiander, a defeated man.

== Driven from Königsberg ==
The peace-loving policy of Albert was still to demonstrate its futility. The ambiguity of the Württemberg declaration seemed to him to constitute a good formula of union, and on 24 January 1553 he required that sermons on justification should be preached according to the six Württemberg articles, and that all coarseness should be avoided. This was tantamount to a defense of Osiandrianism, but the great majority of the duke's subjects were opposed, while Mörlin declared himself unable to obey the ducal mandate when contrary to the obligations of religion. This was the only course open to him, but the duke's displeasure was now finally incurred, and on 16 February 1553 he presented his resignation. Three days later he sought refuge in Danzig, where he awaited an expected recall, supported as he was by the council and the citizens. But all appeals to the duke were in vain; and the exile at last resigned himself to his punishment and sought for a new field of activity.

Mörlin had not long to wait. Brunswick and Lübeck were rivals for his services; the former won by right of priority, and he entered Brunswick on 25 July 1553. In the following year he received an assistant in the Melanchthonian Martin Chemnitz, and developed a powerful activity, strengthening the Lutheran cause with the aid of the religious peace of Augsburg, and preparing, in 1577, his Leges pro ministerio Brunsvicensi, which all the clergy of his superintendency were required to subscribe when entering upon office. He assailed the Reformed as bitterly as the Roman Catholics.

Again, in 1564, the council of Brunswick enacted that the Corpus doctrinae should be subscribed by all theologians, a rule which remained in force until 1672. And this was no dead letter, for in 1566 Johannes Becker, a pastor in Brunswick who had subscribed to the Corpus but become a Calvinist, was forced to resign and ultimately was banished from the city.

Meanwhile, Mörlin and Chemnitz were active in other inter-Lutheran controversies and in warding off Calvinistic attacks; and the former was the prime mover in the rejection, by the Brunswick clergy, of the doctrines of Schwenckfeld, besides being one of those asked by the council of Bremen to settle the dispute between Johann Timann and Albert Hardenberg. He furthermore defended Hesshusen in his pamphlet Wider die Landlügen der heidelbergischen Theologen (1565).

== Efforts for Theological Reconciliation ==
In the struggle with Calvinism Mörlin supported Joachim Westphal, and to this end wrote his Confessio fidei de eucharistiae sacramento ministrorum ecclesiarum Saxonicarum (Magdeburg, 1557). At Coswik he sought to mediate between Melanchthon and Flacius, and in his eagerness for peace, when the delegates of the Hanseatic League assembled at Brunswick, he held a conference with Chemnitz, Westphal, and others (on 14 January 1557) and reached an agreement on articles tending to reconcile the adiaphorists and those holding to the true Gospel. Mörlin then took these articles to Flacius at Magdeburg, after which he conferred with Melanchthon at Wittenberg, but returned to Brunswick unsuccessful (on 28 January 1557).

Eight months later Mörlin went to the Colloquy of Worms, but by his opposition to the Philippists and by his withdrawal helped render the conference resultless. In December 1558 he visited Weimar and Jena to reconcile Flacius and Strigel, and in 1560 he signed the petition of the Jena theologians to the princes to call a Lutheran synod to combat Calvinism. Mörlin was also a prominent figure at the conference of theologians from Lower Saxony held at Lüneburg in July 1561, and wrote the confession of faith there drawn up, Erklärung aus Gottes Wort und kurzer Bericht der Artikel, etc. (Magdeburg, Jena, and Regensburg, 1561), which became binding on all pastors in Brunswick; and he again showed his Wittenberg orthodoxy in his Verantwortung der Präfation so für die lüneburgischen Artikel (1562).

In 1563 the Council of Wesel asked the opinion of the Brunswick theologians for a ruling on the admission of Reformed refugees from England, and the decision was that the immigrants should be received and instructed; but, should they propagate their erroneous views, they should be expelled.

In 1566 and 1567 Mörlin found himself compelled to break with his old friend Flacius because of the latter's teaching on original sin; and at the same time he wrote against the Antinomians his Tres disputationes de tertio usu legis.

== Recalled to Königsberg ==
Meanwhile, inspired partly by him, the struggle had continued in Prussia between the Melanchthonians and the Osiandrian peace-policy of the court. Well informed of all that went on in Königsberg, Mörlin strengthened his sympathisers with his Historia welcher Gestalt sich die osiandrische Schwärmerei im Lande zu Preussen erhoben (Brunswick, 1554). In 1555 he published two other pamphlets on the course of events in Prussia; and finally Albert found himself obliged to yield.

On 30 November 1566 Mörlin was invited to return to Prussia, but he declined to leave Brunswick. The invitation was repeated, however (31 January 1567), and after much persuasion Mörlin accepted and obtained leave of absence from the reluctant Council of Brunswick. On 9 April 1567 he and Chemnitz were joyfully welcomed in Königsberg, and at once began the restoration of Melanchthonian orthodoxy.

After much consideration it was decided that the confessional bases should remain the Augsburg Confession, the Apology, and the Schmalkald Articles, the only change being the correction of certain false doctrines which had crept in since the formulation of the Augsburg Confession. The duke, assenting to the rejection of Osiandrianism, readily agreed, and on 6 May Mörlin and Chemnitz gave him their Repetitio corporis doctrinae Christianae, refuting Osiandrianism, Synergism, Antinomianism, Majorism, and similar teachings. Accepted by the synod and the estates, the Repetitio was proclaimed by Albert on 8 July 1567 and Prussia was at last free from theological rancor.

== Becomes Bishop of Samland ==
Though offered the bishopric of Samland, and though urged by clergy and laity alike to remain in Prussia, Mörlin still felt bound to Brunswick. Accordingly, promised by the estates (8 June 1567) that no Calvinists should be allowed at court, he returned to Brunswick. But his stay there was brief, and he was unexpectedly released. Learning that a patricide had been let go free, both he and Chemmtz sharply upbraided the magistracy in a sermon on 13 July, and were cited to appear before the court. Under these circumstances the envoys of Albert succeeded in inducing the council, unwilling though it was even then, to let Mörlin go (on 24 September 1567). He was now declared bishop of Samland, while Chemnitz was made superintendent. Henceforth until his death, in his new office, Mörlin was active in preaching and catechizing, never ceasing to polemize against Philippists, Synergists, and, above all, Calvinists. He died, aged 57, in Königsberg.

Joachim Mörlin Born: 5 April 1514 in Wittenberg upon Elbe Died: 29 May 1571 in Königsberg in Prussia
Titles in Lutheranism
Preceded by George of Polentz	Bishop of Samland; 1550-1571	Succeeded by Tilemann Heshusius
