= Philippists =

The Philippists formed a party in early Lutheranism. Their opponents were called Gnesio-Lutherans.

== Before Luther's death ==
Philippists was the designation usually applied in the latter half of the sixteenth century to the followers of Philipp Melanchthon. It probably originated among the opposite or Flacian party, and was applied at first to the theologians of the universities of Wittenberg and Leipzig, who were all adherents of Melanchthon's distinctive views, especially those in which he approximated to Roman Catholic doctrine on the subject of free will and the value of good works, and to the Swiss Reformers' on the Lord's Supper. Somewhat later it was used in Saxony to designate a distinct party organized by Melanchthon's son-in-law Caspar Peucer, with George Cracovius, Johann Stössel, and others, to work for a union of all the Protestant forces, as a means to which end they attempted to break down by this attitude the barriers which separated Lutherans and Calvinists. Melanchthon had won, by his eminent abilities as a teacher and his clear, scholastic formulation of doctrine, a large number of disciples among whom were included some of the most zealous Lutherans, such as Matthias Flacius and Tilemann Heshusius, afterward to be numbered among the vehement opponents of Philippism; both of whom formally and materially received the forms of doctrine shaped by Melanchthon. As long as Luther lived, the conflict with external foes and the work of building up the Evangelical Church so absorbed the Reformers that the internal differences which had already begun to show themselves were kept in the background.

== Opposition to Melanchthon ==
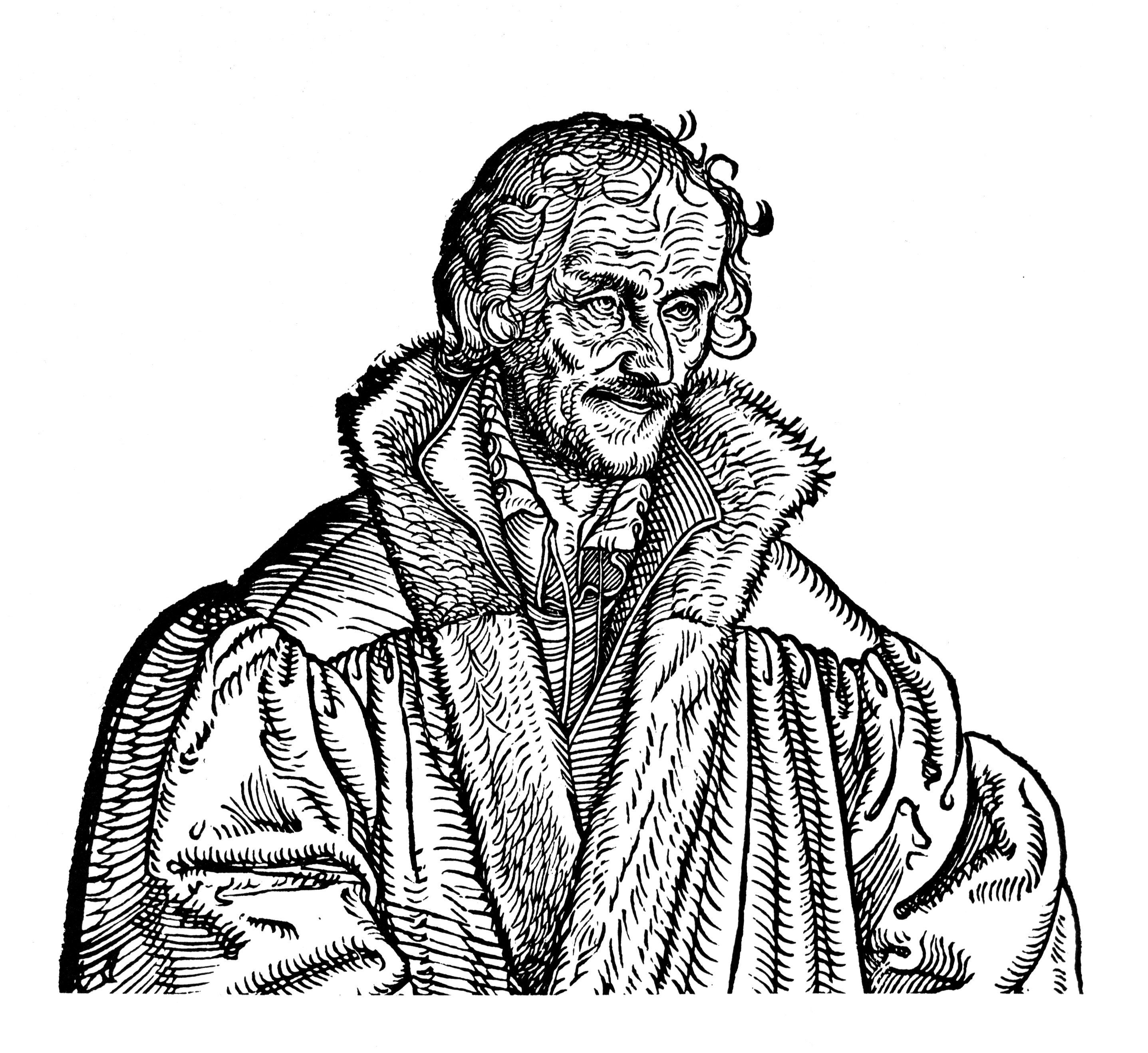
Melanchthon as an old man by Lucas Cranach the Elder

But no sooner was Luther dead than did the internal, as well as the external, peace of the Lutheran Church decline. It was a misfortune not only for Melanchthon but for the whole Lutheran body, that he who had formerly stood as a teacher by the side Luther, the original leader, was now forced suddenly into the position to head not only the University of Wittenberg but the entire Evangelical Church of Germany. There was among Luther's associates, notably Nikolaus von Amsdorf, a disinclination to accept Melanchthon's leadership. When, in the negotiations between German Protestants and Catholics that resulted in the Augsburg Interim and Leipzig Interim, Melanchthon showed himself ready to yield and make concessions on matters adiaphora, he ruined his position with a large part of the Evangelical theologians. An opposition party was formed in which the leadership was assumed by Flacius in view of his learning, controversial ability, and inflexible firmness. Melanchthon, on the other hand, with his faithful followers Joachim Camerarius, Georg Major, Justus Menius, Johann Pfeffinger, Paul Eber, Caspar Cruciger the Elder, Victorinus Strigel, and others saw in the self-styled genuine Lutherans nothing but a narrow and contentious class, which, ignoring the inherent teaching of Luther, sought to domineer over the church by letter and name, and in addition to assert its own ambitious self. On the other hand, the Philippists regarded themselves as the faithful guardians of learning over against the alleged "barbarism," and as the mean between the extremes. The genuine Lutherans also claimed to be representatives of the pure doctrine, defenders of orthodoxy, and heirs of the spirit of Martin Luther. Personal, political, and ecclesiastical animosities widened the breach; such as the rivalry between the Ernestine branch of the Saxon house (now extruded from the electoral dignity) and the Albertine branch; the jealousy between the new Ernestine University of Jena and the electoral universities of Wittenberg and Leipzig, in both of which the Philippists had the majority; and the bitter personal antagonism felt at Wittenberg for Flacius, who assailed his former teachers harshly and made all reconciliation impossible.

== Open conflict ==
The actual conflict began with the controversy over the Interim and the question of Adiaphora in 1548 and the following years. In the negotiations concerning the Leipzig Interim the Wittenberg theologians as well as Johann Pfeffinger and the intimate of Melanchthon, George of Anhalt, were on the side of Melanchthon, and thus drew upon themselves the violent opposition of the strict Lutherans, under the leadership of Flacius, who now severed his connection with Wittenberg. When the Philippist Georg Major at Wittenberg and Justus Menius at Gotha put forth the proposition that good works were necessary to salvation, or as Menius preferred to say "the new obedience, the new life, is necessary to salvation," they were not only conscious of the danger that the doctrine of justification by faith alone would lead to antinomianism and moral laxity but they manifested a tendency to bring into account the necessary connection of justification and regeneration: namely, that justification as possession of forgiving grace by faith is indeed not conditioned by obedience; but also that the new life is presupposed by obedience and works springing out of the same justification. But neither Major nor Menius was sufficiently firm in his view to stand against the charge of denying the doctrine of justification and going over to the Roman camp, and thus they were driven back to the general proposition of justification by faith alone. The Formula of Concord closed the controversy by avoiding both extremes, but failed to offer a final solution of the question demanded by the original motive of the controversy. The synergistic controversy, breaking out about the same time, also sprang out of the ethical interest which had induced Melanchthon to enunciate the doctrine of free will in opposition to his previous predestinarianism. After the clash in 1555 between Pfeffinger (who in his Propositiones de libero arbitrio had held closely to the formula of Melanchthon) and Amsdorf and Flacius, Strigel went deeper into the matter in 1559 and insisted that grace worked upon sinful men as upon personalities, not natural objects without a will; and that in the position that there was a spontaneous cooperation of human powers released by grace there was an actual lapse into the Roman Catholic view. The suspicions now entertained against Melanchthon and his school were quickened by the renewed outbreak of the sacramentarian controversy in 1552. Joachim Westphal accused Melanchthon of agreement with John Calvin, and from this time the Philippists rested under the suspicion of Crypto-Calvinism. The more the German Lutherans entertained a dread of the invasion of Calvinism, the more they mistrusted every announcement of a formula of the Lord's Supper after the form of Luther's doctrine yet obscure. The controversy on this subject, in which Melanchthon's friend Albert Rizaeus Hardenberg of Bremen was involved with Johann Timann and then with Heshusius, leading to his deposition in 1561, elevated the doctrine of ubiquity to an essential of Lutheran teaching. The Wittenberg pronouncement on the subject prudently confined itself to Biblical expressions and forewarned itself against unnecessary disputations, which only strengthened the suspicion of unavowed sympathy with Calvin.

== Lutheran strictures ==
The strict Lutherans sought to strike a decisive blow at Philippism. This was apparent at the Weimar meeting of 1556 and in the negotiations of Coswig and Magdeburg in this and the following years, which showed a tendency to work not so much for the reconciliation of the contending parties as for a personal humiliation of Melanchthon. He, although deeply wounded, showed great restraint in his public utterances; but his followers in Leipzig and Wittenberg paid their opponents back in their own coin. The heat of partizan feeling was displayed at the Conference of Worms in 1557, where the Flacian party did not hesitate, even in the presence of Roman Catholics, to show their enmity for Melanchthon and his followers. After several well-meant attempts at pacification on the part of the Lutheran princes, the most passionate outbreak occurred in the last year of Melanchthon's life, 1559, in connection with the "Weimar Confutation" published by Duke John Frederick, in which together with the errors of Servetus, Schwenckfeld, the Antinomians, Zwingli, and others, the principal special doctrines of the Philippists (Synergism, Majorism, see Majoristic Controversy, adiaphorism) were denounced as dangerous errors and corruptions. It led, however, to discord among the Jena theologians themselves, since Strigel defended against Flacius Melanchthon's doctrine on sin and grace, and drew upon himself very rough treatment from the impetuous duke. But the ultimate outcome was the decline of the University of Jena, the deposition of the strict Lutheran professors and the replacing of them by Philippists. It seemed for the time that the Thuringian opposition to the Philippism of Electoral Saxony was broken; but with the downfall of John Frederick and the accession of his brother John William to power, the tables were turned; the Philippists at Jena were again displaced (1568–69) by the strict Lutherans, Johann Wigand, Cölestin, Kirchner, and Heshusius, and the Jena opposition to Wittenberg was once more organized, finding voice in the Bekenntnis von der Rechtfertigung und guten Werken of 1569. The Elector August was now very anxious to restore peace in the Saxon territories, and John William agreed to call a conference at Altenburg (Oct. 21, 1568), in which the principal representatives of Philippism were Paul Eber and Caspar Cruciger the Younger, and of the other side Wigand, Cölestin, and Kirchner. It led to no result, although it continued until the following March. The Philippists asserted the Augsburg Confession of 1540, the loci of Melanchthon of the later editions, and of the Corpus Philippicum, met by the challenge from the other side that these were an attack upon the pure teaching and authority of Luther. Both sides claimed the victory, and the Leipzig and Wittenberg Philippists issued a justification of their position in the Endlicher Bericht of 1571, with which is connected the protest of the Hessian theologians in conference at Ziegenhain in 1570 against Flacian Lutheranism and in favor of Philippism.

== Downfall ==
Pure Lutheranism was now fortified in a number of local churches by Corpora doctrinæ of a strict nature, and the work for concord went on more and more definitely along the lines of eliminating Melanchthonism. The Philippists, fully alarmed, attempted not only to consolidate in Electoral Saxony but to gain ascendency over the entire German Evangelical Church. They met their downfall first in Electoral Saxony. The conclusion of the Altenburg Colloquy prompted the elector, in Aug., 1569, to issue orders that all the ministers in his domains should hold to the Corpus doctrinæ Philippicum, intending thus to avoid Flacian exaggerations and guard the pure original doctrine of Luther and Melanchthon in the days of their union. But the Wittenberg men interpreted it as an approval of their Philippism, especially in regard to the Lord's Supper and the person of Christ. They pacified the elector, who had become uneasy, by the Consensus Dresdensis of 1571, a cleverly worded document; and when on the death of John William, in 1574, August assumed the regency in Ernestine Saxony and began to drive out not only strict Lutheran zealots like Heshusius and Wigand, but all who refused their subscription to the Consensus, the Philippists thought they were on the way to a victory which should give them all Germany. But the unquestionably Calvinist work of Joachim Cureus, Exegesis perspicua de sacra cœna (1574), and a confidential letter of Johann Stössel which fell into the elector's hands opened his eyes. The heads of the Philippist party were imprisoned and roughly handled, and the Torgau Confession of 1574 completed their downfall. By the adoption of the Formula of Concord their cause was ruined in all the territories which accepted it, although in some others it survived under the aspect of a modified Lutheranism, as in Nuremberg, or, as in Nassau, Hesse, Anhalt, and Bremen, where it became more or less definitely identified with Calvinism. It raised its head once more in Electoral Saxony in 1586, on the accession of Christian I., but on his death five years later it came to a sudden and bloody end with the execution of Nikolaus Krell as a victim to this unpopular revival of Calvinism.
