= Magdeburg Centuries =

Ecclesiastical history

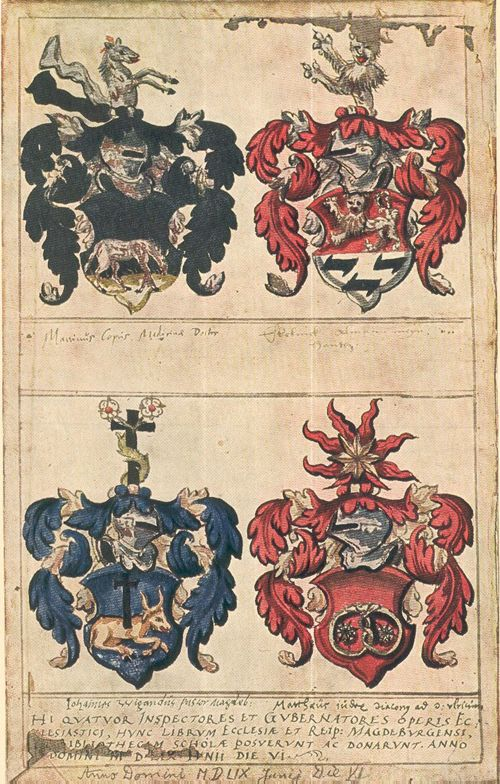
Ex libris from a now-lost copy of the Centuries

The Magdeburg Centuries is an ecclesiastical history, divided into thirteen centuries, covering thirteen hundred years, ending in 1298; it was first published from 1559 to 1574. It was compiled by several Lutheran scholars in Magdeburg, known as the Centuriators of Magdeburg. The chief of the Centuriators was Matthias Flacius. Lutheran theologian Werner Elert argued that due to its revolutionary critical method of presenting history, it is the basis of all modern church history. It is said that Baronius undertook his Annales Ecclesiastici purely to oppose the Magdeburg Centuriators.

== Themes ==
The Magdeburg Centuries demonstrates the continuity of the Christian faith throughout the ages. As the Centuries put it, Church history shows a "perpetual agreement in the teaching of each article of faith in all ages". Instead of presenting a Restorationist platform, the writers held that "this very form of the teaching which we now have in our churches because of the great kindness of God is that very ancient one, not a new one; genuine, not adulterous; true, not fabricated." The view of the work is generally pessimistic after the fifth century, in keeping with the writers' objective of presenting "the origins and the increments of errors and their corrupting influences."

Presenting a view of such corrupting errors by the Catholic Church, increasing and accumulating over a thousand years' time, served to legitimize the Reformation and make Lutherans rather than Catholics into the true heirs of the original Christianity founded by Jesus Christ and his disciples. Another characteristic of the work is the widespread use of primary sources rather than secondary or tertiary ones. In order to accomplish this, scholars traveled and borrowed manuscripts from all over Europe. With such diverse sources, one might expect a fractured or incoherent presentation of history. Instead, it provides a perspective that is completely independent from any of its sources, even though they are as wide-ranging as Gregory of Nazianzus and Alcuin.

== Criticism ==
Not only are the volumes artificially divided by century rather than by historical eras, but each century is treated from a similar perspective, rather than from a fresh perspective for every era of history. Catholics have dissented from controversial historical arguments in the Centuries, made to discredit the papacy, including the identification of the pope as the Anti-Christ, and the legend of Pope Joan.

== Full title ==
The full title of the work is Ecclesiastica Historia, integram Ecclesiae Christi ideam, quantum ad Locum, Propagationem, Persecutionem, Tranquillitatem, Doctrinam, Hæreses, Ceremonias, Gubernationem, Schismata, Synodos, Personas, Miracula, Martyria, Religiones extra Ecclesiam, & statum Imperii politicum attinet, secundum singulas Centurias, perspicuo ordine complectens: singulari diligentia & fide ex vetustissimis & optimis historicis, patribus, & aliis scriptoribus congesta: Per aliquot studiosos & pios viros in urbe Magdeburgicâ.

== Origin and composition ==
The first three folio volumes of the work appeared in 1559 at Basel. It was the work of a group of Lutheran scholars who had gathered at Magdeburg, and who are now known to history as the Centuriators of Magdeburg because of the way in which they divided their work (century by century) and the place in which the first five volumes were written; most of the others were written at Wismar or elsewhere, but the subtitle in Urbe Magdeburgicâ was retained.

The originator of the idea and the moving spirit of the organization which produced the work was Matthias Vlacich (Latinized Flacius), also known as Francovich, and, from the country of his birth (Istria), Illyricus. Born in 1520, he went to university in 1539 in Switzerland and Germany, where, at Augsburg, Basle, Tübingen, and Wittenberg, he converted to Lutheranism. The Augsburg Interim of 1548 led to the Adiaphoristic controversy, in the course of which he wrote numerous harsh criticisms of the Reformer Philipp Melanchthon; the bitter feeling generated gave rise to the hostile parties of Philippists and Flacians. All attempts to restore peace failed, and the University of Jena, where Flacius was appointed professor of theology in 1557, became a centre of rigid Lutheranism in strong opposition to Melachthon. His wanderings after 1562, and the numerous domestic controversies between the Reformers, in which Flacius took part until his death (11 March 1575), did not prevent him from becoming the most learned Lutheran theologian of his day, while, in addition to numerous minor controversial works, his untiring energy led him to devise the vast historical work known as "The Centuries".

After Martin Luther's death in 1546, anti-Catholic controversy tended to lose its dogmatic character and to become historical. Flacius critiqued the history of Catholicism, and in that spirit wrote his once famous and influential catalogue of anti-papal witnesses, Catalogus testium veritatis, qui ante nostram aetatem reclamarunt Papae (Basel, 1556; enlarged ed., Strasburg, 1562; ed. by Dietericus, Frankfort, 1672). Some four hundred anti-papal witnesses were cited, Pope Gregory I and Thomas Aquinas being included in the number of those who had stood up for truth against "the Papal Antichrist".

As early as 1553, Flacius was seeking patrons whose financial support should enable him to carry out his plan of a comprehensive church history which was "to reveal the beginnings, the development and the ruthless designs of the Antichrist." The German princes, and the burghers particularly of Augsburg and Nuremberg, helped him generously, but no support was forthcoming from the followers of Melanchthon. He travelled through Germany in search of material while his co-worker, Marcus Wagner (from Weimar near Gotha), searched the libraries of Austria, Bavaria, Scotland, and Denmark for the same purpose.

Research has emphasized the importance of the assistance given by the crypto-Protestant, Caspar von Nydbruck, imperial counselor, and head of the Imperial Library of Vienna, whose influence was exerted throughout Europe on behalf of the work. The editorial board, Gubernatores et Inspectores institut historiæ Ecclesiasticæ, was composed of Flacius, John Wigand (1523–1587), superintendent at Magdeburg, Matthew Judex (1528–1576), preacher at Magdeburg, Basil Faber (1525–1576), humanist, who collaborated in the first four Centuries, Martin Copusgas, a physician who acted as treasurer, and Eblinek Alman, a burgher of Magdeburg, each of whom had his own assistants. Seven junior assistants were appointed to compile extracts from early Christian writers and historians in accordance with a fixed plan; two more mature scholars acted as "architects", grouped the material, and submitted it to the editors. When approved, the materials were worked up into chapters and again submitted before the final form was fair-copied.

== Contents ==
An analysis of the Quarta Centuria, (Fourth Century) which appeared in 1560, will give an idea of the contents:

- Title page
- dedication to Queen Elizabeth (co. 3–12)
  1. brief statement of the chief events of the century (col.13)
  2. spread of the Church: where and how (13–35)
  3. persecution and peace of the Church under Diocletian and Maximian (35–159)
  4. the Church's teaching and its history (160–312)
  5. heresies (312–406)
  6. rites and ceremonies (406 -483)
  7. Church discipline and government (483–582)
  8. schisms and controversies (583–609)
  9. councils (609–880)
  10. leading bishops and doctors (880–1337)
  11. leading heretics (1338–1403)
  12. the martyrs (1403–1432)
  13. miracles and miraculous occurrences (1433–1456)
  14. political relations of the Jews (1456–1462)
  15. other non-Christian religions (1462–1560)
  16. political changes (1560–1574)
- Scriptural index (8 cols.)
- general index (92 pages of four columns)

This method was applied only to the first thirteen centuries, which were published separately in folio volumes at Basel; I–III in 1559 (reprinted 1560, 1562, 1564); IV in 1560 (reprinted 1562); V and VI in 1562; VII and VIII in 1564; IX in 1565; X and XI in 1567; XII in 1569; and XIII in 1574. The three remaining centuries were completed in manuscript by Wigand (who was largely responsible for all the work done between 1564–74), but never published, and the various attempts made in the seventeenth and eighteenth centuries to continue the work came to naught. In 1624, a complete edition of the Centuries in six folio volumes was issued at Basel by Louis Lucius, who omitted the authors' names and dedications, and introduced various modifications of the text in a Calvinistic sense. A third edition appeared at Nuremberg 1757–1765, but did not get beyond the fifth century.
