= Johann Stössel =

Johann Stössel (also spelled Stoessel; 24 June 1524 – 18 March 1576) was a Lutheran Theologian and Reformer.

== Life ==
Stössel was born in Kitzingen. He came to Wittenberg at 15 to study theology and philosophy, and became a master after 10 years of study. He then studied at the University of Jena and became a Lutheran.

Since he distanced himself from the Philippists, he was appointed by John Frederick II, Duke of Saxony as a court preacher in Weimar. Here he developed into a zealous Gnesio-Lutheran. As such, he took part in the Reformation in the Margraviate of Baden-Durlach. It was in keeping with his strident attitude that he wanted to include anathemas in the church order there against all dissenters.

He maintained this stance at the Colloquy of Worms of 1557 where he spoke against Philip Melancthon, as well as in the drafting of the Konfutationsbuch. He defended his position in a special Apology. When he accompanied Duke Johann Friedrich to Heidelberg, he tried to bring Elector Frederick III, the Pious, over to his opinions. There he disputed with Pierre Boquin and Thomas Erastus on the Lord's Supper. In the aftermath of this disputation, his theological convictions began to change.

As he began to warm to other theological perspectives, this shift naturally led to a break with the Gnesio-Lutherans. Matthias Flacius Illyricus and Johann Wigand accused him at court, however they were dismissed from their offices themselves. Stössel was appointed Doctor of Theology at the University of Jena in 1864. On the basis of the Declaratio, Nicholas Selnecker and others returned to Jena, but soon left the university. Stössel was left as the only theologian. During this period, Paul Eber oversaw his reception of the first doctorate in Jena.

With the regime change of 1567, Stössel had to give way to the Gnesio-Lutherans. For a short time he was church superintendent in Mühlhausen and then in Pirna. He rose quickly in the favor of Elector August of Saxony that he soon served as his father confessor. His downfall, however, came abruptly. In a series of poorly understood events, Stössel advocated the cause of the Dresden Crypto-Calvinists, was denounced before the Elector, and imprisoned in the castle at Senftenberg, where he died, aged 51, after a short illness.

== Family ==
Stössel was married to Miss Musa. She died in the same week that he did.
