= Justus Menius =

German Lutheran pastor and Protestant reformer

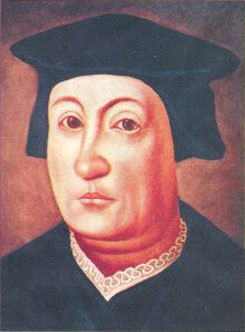
Justus Menius

Justus Menius (13 December 1499 – 11 August 1558) was a German Lutheran pastor and Protestant reformer whose name is Latinized from Jost or Just (i.e. Jodocus) Menig.

== Early life ==
Menius was born in Fulda to poor but respectable parents. Entering the University of Erfurt in 1514, he received his bachelor's degree in 1515 and his master's degree in 1516. At this time, in association with the keen humanists Conrad Mutian, Crotus Rubeanus, and Eoban Hess, Menius became more sceptical. Moving to Wittenberg in 1519, he became evangelical under the teaching of Philipp Melanchthon and the preaching of Martin Luther.

After travel in Italy (1521–1522) Menius was appointed (1523) town preacher at Wittenberg, but was soon transferred to the charge of Mühlberg, under Erfurt. Here he published his commentary on Acts (1524) and married. He resigned his charge (1525) and opened a school at Erfurt, but the town council insisted on his resuming his ministry, appointing him preacher in St Thomas, Erfurt. He worked in conjunction with Luther's friend, John Lange, and was opposed by the Franciscans under Conrad Kling.

== Major works ==
Menius left for Gotha (1528), resumed teaching, and enjoyed the friendship of Friedrich Myconius. John, Elector of Saxony, had placed him on the commission for church visitation in Thuringia, and in 1529 appointed him pastor and superintendent at Eisenach, where for eighteen years he administered church affairs with tact, and fostered the spread of education. In 1529 he brought out his Oeconomia christiana (a treatise in German, on the right ordering of a Christian household) with a dedication to Duchess Sybil of Saxony and a preface by Luther. Menius's tractate, written in concert with Myconius, controverting Der Wiedertaufer Lehre und Geheimniss (1530) was also prefaced by Luther.

The reversion to the Roman communion of his old friend Crotus led to his mordant Responsio amici (1532, anon.) to the Apologia (1531) of Crotus. He took his part in the theological disputations of the time, at Marburg (1529), the Concordia at Wittenberg (1536), the Convention at Schmalkalden (1537), and the discussions at Hagenau and Worms (1540). His tractate (1542) against the permission of bigamy in the case of Philip of Hesse was not allowed to be printed (the manuscript is in the University of Heidelberg library).

== Later life ==
In 1542 Menius moved to Mühlhausen, being appointed by Maurice, Elector of Saxony, for the ordering of the church there. On the death of Myconius (1546) he was entrusted with the oversight of Gotha, in addition to that of Eisenach; to Gotha he returned in 1547.

The remainder of his life was not happy. He was against the Leipzig Interim (1548) with its compromise on some Catholic usages, and was involved in controversies and quarrels; with Georgius Merula, against whom he maintained the need of exorcism in baptism; with Osiander's adherents in the matter of justification; with his colleague, Nicholas von Amsdorf, to whom he had resigned the Eisenach superintendency; with Flacius Illyricus, and others.

He lost favor with John Frederick I, Elector of Saxony, fell into bad health, was deposed (1555) from his offices, and was disappointed in his hopes of being reinstated, after the colloquy at Eisenach (1556). He died at Leipzig.

Menius was twice married, and had several sons, of whom Eusebius held a chair of philosophy at Wittenberg, and married Melanchthon's granddaughter, Anna Sabinus.

G. L. Schmidt wrote a full bibliography of the numerous writings of Menius, who translated several of Luther's biblical commentaries into German. His Oeconomia was reprinted in 1855.
