= Georg Major =

German Lutheran theologian (1502–1574)

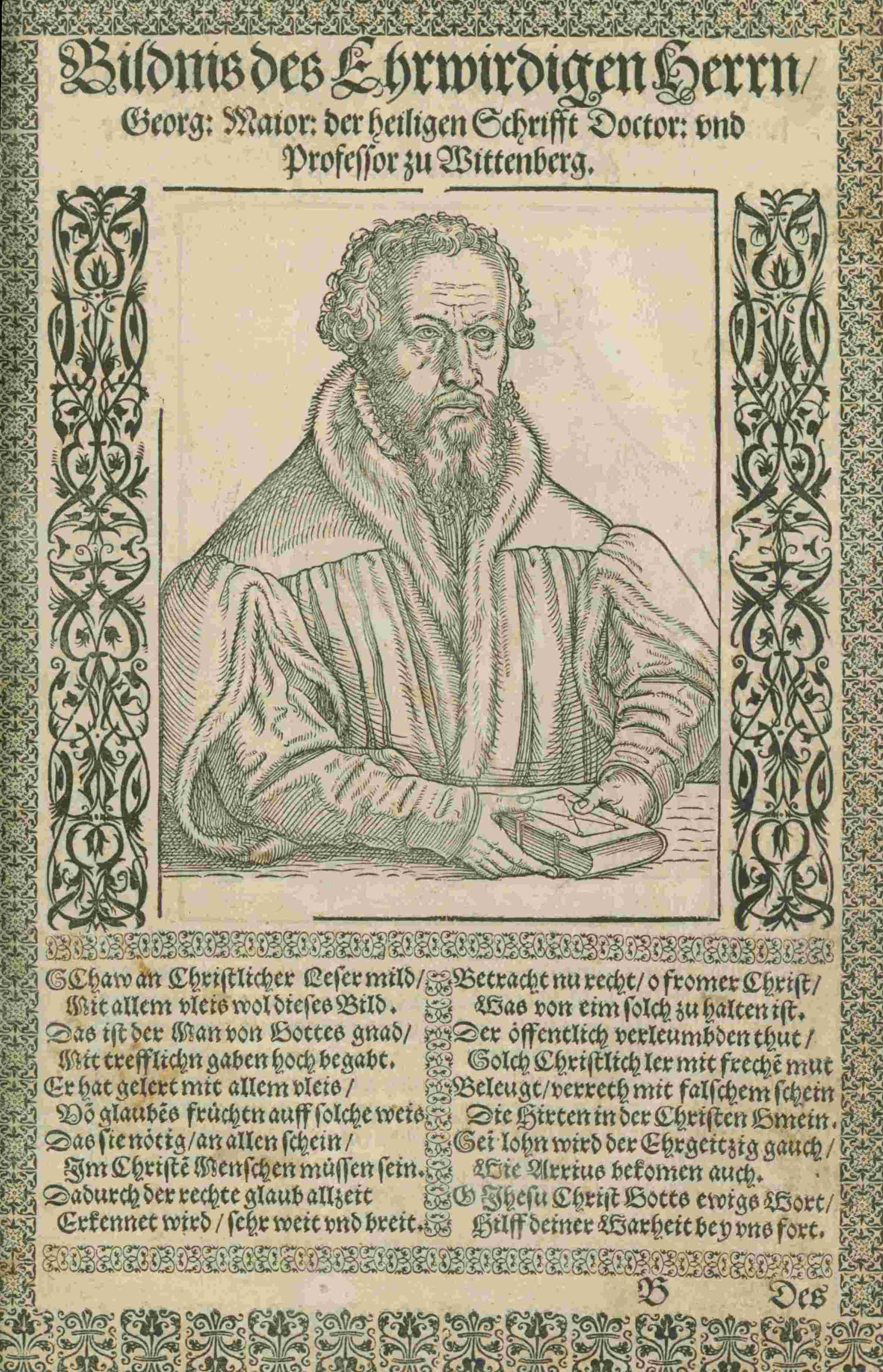
Portrait of Georg Major from the Warhaffte Bildnis etlicher Hochloeblichen Fuersten vnd Herrn, 1562

Georg Major (April 25, 1502 – November 28, 1574) was a Lutheran theologian of the Protestant Reformation.

== Life ==
Major was born in Nuremberg in 1502. At the age of nine he was sent to Wittenberg, and in 1521 he entered the university there. He was a student of Martin Luther and Philip Melanchthon, the latter being a particular influence. When Cruciger returned to Wittenberg in 1529, Major was appointed rector of the Johannisschule in Magdeburg, but in 1537 he became court preacher at Wittenberg and was ordained by Martin Luther. He began to lecture on theology in 1541.

In 1545 he joined the theological faculty, and his authority increased to such an extent that in the following year the elector sent him to the Conference of Regensburg, where he was soon captivated by the personality of Butzer. Like Philipp Melanchthon, he fled before the disastrous close of the Schmalkald war, and found refuge in Magdeburg. In the summer of 1547, he returned to Wittenberg, and in the same year became cathedral superintendent at Merseburg, although he resumed his activity at the university in the following year.

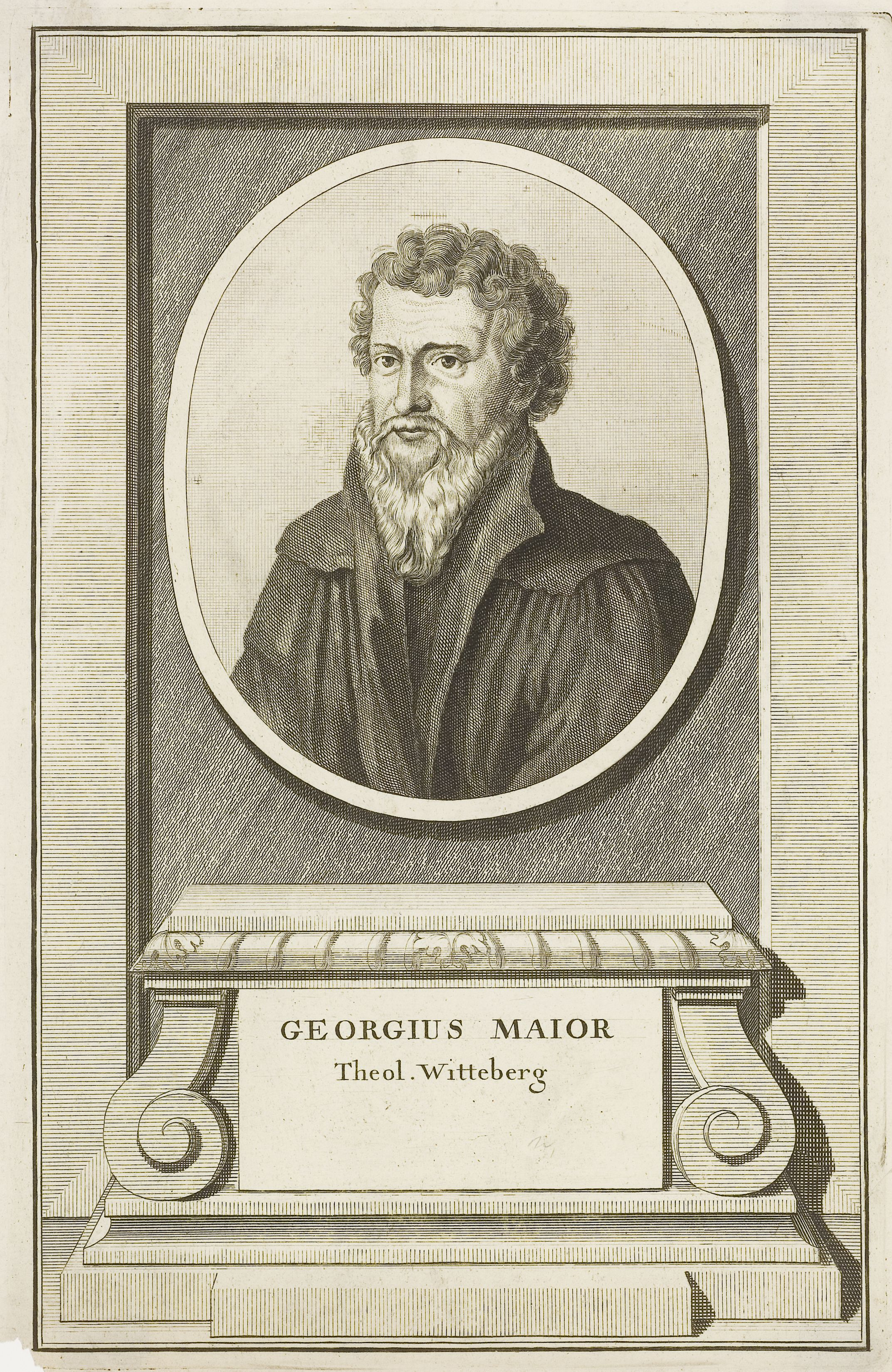
Georg Major

In the negotiations of the Augsburg Interim, he took the part of Melanchthon in first opposing it and then making concessions. This attitude incurred the enmity of the opponents of the Interim, especially after he cancelled a number of passages in the second edition of his Psalterium in which he had violently attacked the position of Maurice, Elector of Saxony, whom he now requested to prohibit all polemical treatises proceeding from Magdeburg, while he condemned the preachers of Torgau who were imprisoned in Wittenberg on account of their opposition to the Interim. He was even accused of accepting bribes from Maurice.

In 1552, Count Hans Georg, who favored the Interim, appointed him superintendent of Eisleben, on the recommendation of Melchior Kling. The orthodox clergy of the County of Mansfeld, however, immediately suspected him of being an interimist and adiaphorist, and he tried to defend his position in public, but his apology resulted in a dispute called the Majoristic Controversy.

At Christmas, 1552, Count Albrecht expelled him without trial and he fled to Wittenberg, where he resumed his activity as professor and member of the Wittenberg Consistory. Thence forth he was an important and active member in the circle of the Wittenberg Philippists.

From 1558 to 1574 he was dean of the theological faculty and repeatedly held the rectorate of the university. He lived long enough to experience the first overthrow of Crypto-Calvinism in the Electorate of Saxony, and Paul Crell, his son-in-law, signed for him at Torgau in May 1574 the articles which repudiated Calvinism and acknowledged the unity of Luther and Melanchthon.

He died at Wittenberg in 1574.

== Works ==
His significant writings include:

- A text edition of Justini ex Trogo Pompejo historia (Hagenau, 1526);
- an edition of Luther's smaller catechism in Latin and Low German (Magdeburg, 1531);
- Sententiae veterum poetarum (1534);
- Quaestiones rhetoricae (1535);
- Vita Patrum (Wittenberg, 1544);
- Psalterium Davidis juxta translationem veterem repurgatum (1547);
- De origine et auctoritate verbi Dei (1550);
- Commonefactio ad ecclesiam catholicam, orthodoxam, de fugiendis ... blasphemiis Samosatenicis (1569).

He also wrote commentaries on the Pauline epistles and homilies on the pericopes.
