= Tilemann Heshusius =

Gnesio-Lutheran theologian and Protestant reformer

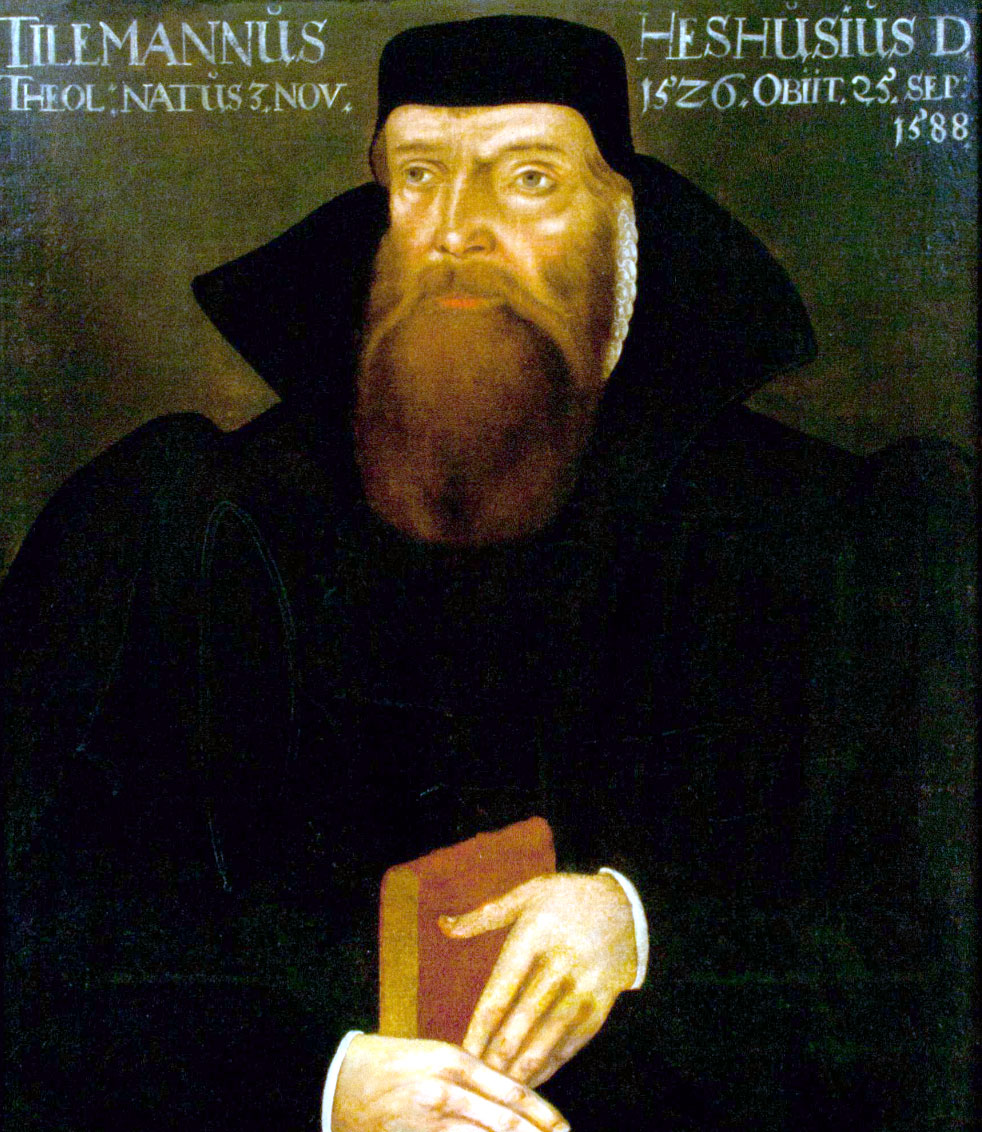
- Born: 3 November 1527; Wesel, Duchy of Cleves, Holy Roman Empire
- Died: 25 September 1588 (aged 60); Helmstedt, Principality of Brunswick-Wolfenbüttel, Holy Roman Empire
- Occupation: Theologian

Tilemann Heshusius (also Hesshus, Heßhusen, Hess Husen, Heshusen) (3 November 1527 in Wesel — 25 September 1588 in Helmstedt) was a Gnesio-Lutheran theologian and Protestant reformer.

== Life ==
Heshusius came from an influential family in Wesel. He was a student of Philipp Melanchthon at the University of Wittenberg and was consequently close to him. During the time of the Augsburg Interim, he lived in Oxford and Paris. In 1550 he took his master's degree and was received by the Senate of the philosophical faculty; he lectured on rhetoric and as well as theology. In 1553 he became Superintendent in Goslar and acquired his doctoral degree in Wittenberg on 19 May that year at the expense of the city. However, he soon came into conflict with Goslar and left in 1556 to take a post at the University of Rostock.

There too he became involved in a dispute over Sunday weddings and the participation of Protestants in Roman Catholic celebrations. After attempting to excommunicate two leading city officials, he was expelled from the town. Melanchthon was able to arrange his appointment as general superintendent of the church of the Electorate of the Palatinate in Heidelberg. In 1559 a controversy broke out in Heidelberg over the Lord's Supper between Heshusius and his deacon Wilhelm Klebitz. To restore peace, Elector Frederick released both clerics from their posts—a decision later approved by Melanchthon. He became involved in another controversy over the Lord’s Supper in Bremen, which did not redound to his glory, opposing Albert Hardenberg and Jacob Probst. Heshusius himself resigned and went from there to Magdeburg, where he received the pastorate at the Church of St. John in 1560 and the position of superintendent in 1561. But he would not refrain from publicly testifying against the Crypto-Calvinists, Synergists, and others, and he felt compelled to pronounce the ban on the city council. After continuing to preach in spite of the prohibition he had received, the border warden and 30 to 40 armed citizens invaded and occupied his parsonage property at 3 a.m., with 500 armed citizens stationed at the gate, and he and his "very pregnant wife" were forcibly conducted out of the city on 21 October 1562.

Even his hometown Wesel refused him asylum. Count Palatine Wolfgang of Pfalz-Zweibrücken took him in. After Wolfgang’s death, Heshusius went to Jena. There he advocated the theological position that obedience should be a defining mark of the church in addition to Word and Sacrament (the only two “marks” recognized by most Lutherans). For that reason he challenged Jacob Andreae, Victorinus Strigel, Matthias Flacius and all those who pursued the cause of Lutheran unity.

In 1573, when the Elector August of Saxony took over the administration of Saxe-Weimar after the death of Duke John William, nearly 100 pastors were forced to leave the territory. Heshusius and Johann Wigand went to Königsberg in East Prussia. There Heshusius became the Bishop of Samland in 1573, but when Wigand turned against him, he was dismissed from his post. Martin Chemnitz helped him secure an influential position on the theology faculty at the newly established University of Helmstedt. In 1578 his claims against Wigand were vindicated at the Herzberger Konvent.

Though he had earlier opposed the union efforts of Andreae, he was finally persuaded to sign the Formula of Concord, and every obstacle to its introduction in Brunswick seemed to be removed; but in comparing the printed copy with the written text, Hesshusius found a considerable number of deviations, and was not satisfied with the explanations of Chemnitz. Julius, Duke of Brunswick-Wolfenbüttel, also opposed the Formula, so that it was not accepted in his country, and thus lost much of its general authority.

Tilemann's sons, Gottfried Heshusius (1554-1625) and Heinrich Heshusius (1556-1597) followed him into the ministry and became Lutheran pastors and superintendents in the German lands, generally allied with Gnesio-Lutheran causes and universities.

== Translations ==
- Raising Wings Like the Eagles: Overview of Isaiah 40 and Commentary on Isaiah 40:30-31, translated by Nathaniel J. Biebert (Red Brick Parsonage, 2016).
- An Arduous Business: Overview of 1 Timothy, translated by Nathaniel J. Biebert (Red Brick Parsonage, 2016).

Tilemann Hesshus(en), Latinised: Tilemann Heshusius Born: 3 November 1527 in Wesel Died: 25 September 1588 in Helmstedt
Titles in Lutheranism
Preceded by Joachim Mörlin	Bishop of Samland; 1571–1577	Succeeded by Johannes Wigand per pro Bishop of Pomesania
