= Basil Faber =

Basil Faber (1520–1576), Lutheran schoolmaster and theologian, was born in Sorau (modern Żary), in lower Lusatia, in 1520. In 1538 he entered the University of Wittenberg, studying as pauper gratis under Philipp Melanchthon.

Choosing the schoolmaster's profession, he became successively rector of the schools at Nordhausen, Tennstadt (1555), Magdeburg (1557) and Quedlinburg (1560). From this last post he was removed in December 1570 as a crypto-Calvinist. In 1571 he was appointed to the Rathsgymnasium at Erfurt, not as rector, but as director (Vorsteher). In this situation he remained till his death in 1575 or 1576.

His translation of the first twenty-five chapters of Luther's commentary on Genesis was published in 1557; in other ways he promoted the spread of Lutheran views. He was a contributor to the first four of the Magdeburg Centuries. He is best known by his Thesaurus eruditionis scholasticae (1571; last edition, improved by J. H. Leich, 1749, folio, 2 vols.); this was followed by his Libellus de disciplina scholastica (1572).

== Selected works ==
- Libellus de Synonymia Terentii et copiosa phrasium et locutionum commutatione, Leipzig 1553, 2. Bd. 1556
- Loci observatorium atque expositionum indices numerosissimi in Cicerone Epistolae Familiares omnes, Leipzig 1553
- Libellus de ratione genuina dicendi et scribendi, monstrata e Terentio et Cicerone, Leipzig 1554
- Elenchus legum et disciplinae scholasticae, 1571
- Libellus de disciplina scholastica, 1572
- Thesaurus eruditionis scholasticae, 1571, 1587, 1623, 1625, 1691, 1749
