= Johann Pfeffinger =

German theologian

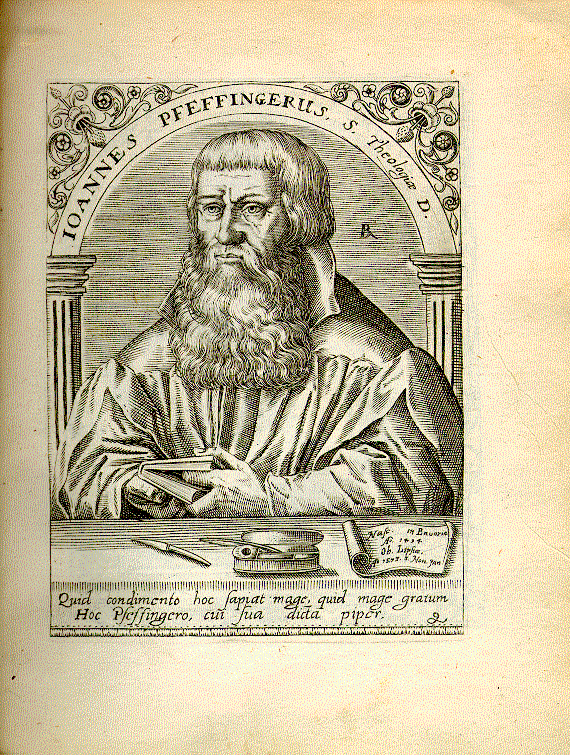
- Pfeffinger from the Bibliotheca chalcographica, hoc est Virtute et eruditione clarorum Virorum Imagines of Jean-Jacques Boissard, 1669
- Born: 27 December 1493; Wasserburg am Inn, Upper Bavaria, Holy Roman Empire
- Died: 1 January 1573 (aged 79); Leipzig, Saxony, Holy Roman Empire
- Occupation: Theologian

Johann Pfeffinger (27 December 1493 – 1 January 1573) was a significant theologian and Protestant Reformer.

== His life and work ==
Devoting himself to the religious life, Pfeffinger became an acolyte at Salzburg in 1515, and soon afterward was made subdeacon and deacon. Receiving a dispensation from the regulations concerning canonical age, he was ordained priest and stationed at Reichenhall, Saalfelden, and Passau, where his clerical activity soon found great approbation. Suspected of Lutheran heresy, he went to Wittenberg in 1523, where he was cordially welcomed by Martin Luther, Philip Melanchthon, and Bugenhagen.

In 1527 he went as parish priest to Sonnenwalde, and in 1530, when expelled by the bishop of Meissen, he removed to the monastery of Eicha, near Leipzig, where his services were attended by many outside the parish. In 1532 he went to Belgern, whence he was delegated, in 1539, to complete the Reformation in Leipzig. In 1540, he was permanently vested with the office of superintendent.

He declined calls to Halle and Breslau, though he took part in completing the work of the Reformation at Glauchau in 1542. In his capacity of censor he prevented further printing of Schenk's postilla. In 1543 he was graduated as the first Protestant doctor of theology, and became a professor of theology in the following year. In 1548 he was made a canon of Meissen.

Duke Maurice of Saxony drew him into the negotiations regarding the introduction of a Protestant church constitution and liturgy. Having been appointed assessor in the Leipzig Consistory in 1543, he participated, in 1545, in the consecration of a bishop of Merseburg as one of the ordaining clergy. In the following year he negotiated at Dresden with Anton Musa and Daniel Greser, and took part in the deliberations concerning the Interim at the Diet of Meissen (July, 1548), at Torgau (October 18), at Altzella (November), and at the Leipzig Saxon Diet (December 22). The Elector August likewise sought formal expressions of opinion from Pfeffinger; and in this connection, in 1555, he proposed, with a view to securing religious uniformity, that the Interim liturgy of 1549 should again be used. Melanchthon, however, opposed this suggestion, holding that, were it adopted, additional religious disunion would follow.

Pfeffinger also took part in the deliberative proceedings of the delegates of the three consistories in 1556, as well as in the Dresden convention of 1571. Pfeffinger's writings were ethical, ascetic, and polemic. His Propositiones de libero arbitrio (1555) occasioned the outbreak of the synergistic strife. Against Nicolaus von Amsdorf he wrote his Antwort (Wittenberg, 1558), Demonstratio mendacii (1558), and Nochmals grundlicher Bericht; while he opposed Matthias Flacius in his Verantwortung. He embodied his tenets in five articles of the Formula der Bekendnus of June 3, 1556, which he also submitted, in amplified form, to the Wittenberg theologians.
