= Moravian Confession =

- Authors: Pavel Aquilinas, Benedikt Ostrožský
- Language: Czech
- Genre: Confession
- Publication date: 1566
- Publication place: Moravia

Moravian Confession is a doctrinal document of Protestants in Moravia from 1566. It is written in moderate and inclusivistic tone (sometimes referred as Philippistic or Neo-Utraquistic). It is based on Augsburg Confession and puts emphasis on church discipline (what is typical for Bohemian Reformation).

About two-thirds of Moravian Protestant clergy adhered initially to Moravian Confession. It was explicitly rejected by Unitas Fratrum (Moravian Church). The importance of the Moravian Confession soon declined, as the Augsburg Confession became prevalent in Moravia by the end of the next decade.

== See also ==
- Bohemian Confession

== Bibliography ==
- Zemek, Petr: Konfese moravských (novo)utrakvistů z roku 1566. Studia Comeniana et Historica 33, 2003, is. 69-70, p. 109-149.
- Hrdlička, Josef - Just, Jiří - Zemek, Petr: Evangelické církevní řády pro šlechtická panství v Čechách a na Moravě 1520 -1620. České Budějovice, 2018.
