= Strigel =

Strigel is a German surname. Notable people with the surname include:

- Bernhard Strigel (c. 1461–1528), German painter
- Daniel Strigel (born 1975), German fencer
- Victorinus Strigel (1524–1569), German Lutheran theologian
