= Crypto-Calvinism =

Pejorative term in 16-th century Germany

Crypto-Calvinism is a pejorative term describing a segment of those members of the Lutheran Church in Germany who were accused of secretly subscribing to Calvinist doctrine of the Eucharist in the decades immediately after the death of Martin Luther in 1546. It denotes what was seen as a hidden (crypto- from Greek: κρύπτω meaning "to hide, conceal, to be hid") Calvinist belief, i.e., the doctrines of John Calvin, by members of the Lutheran Church. The term crypto-Calvinist in Lutheranism was preceded by terms Zwinglian and Sacramentarian. Also, Jansenism has been accused of crypto-Calvinism by Roman Catholics.

== Background ==
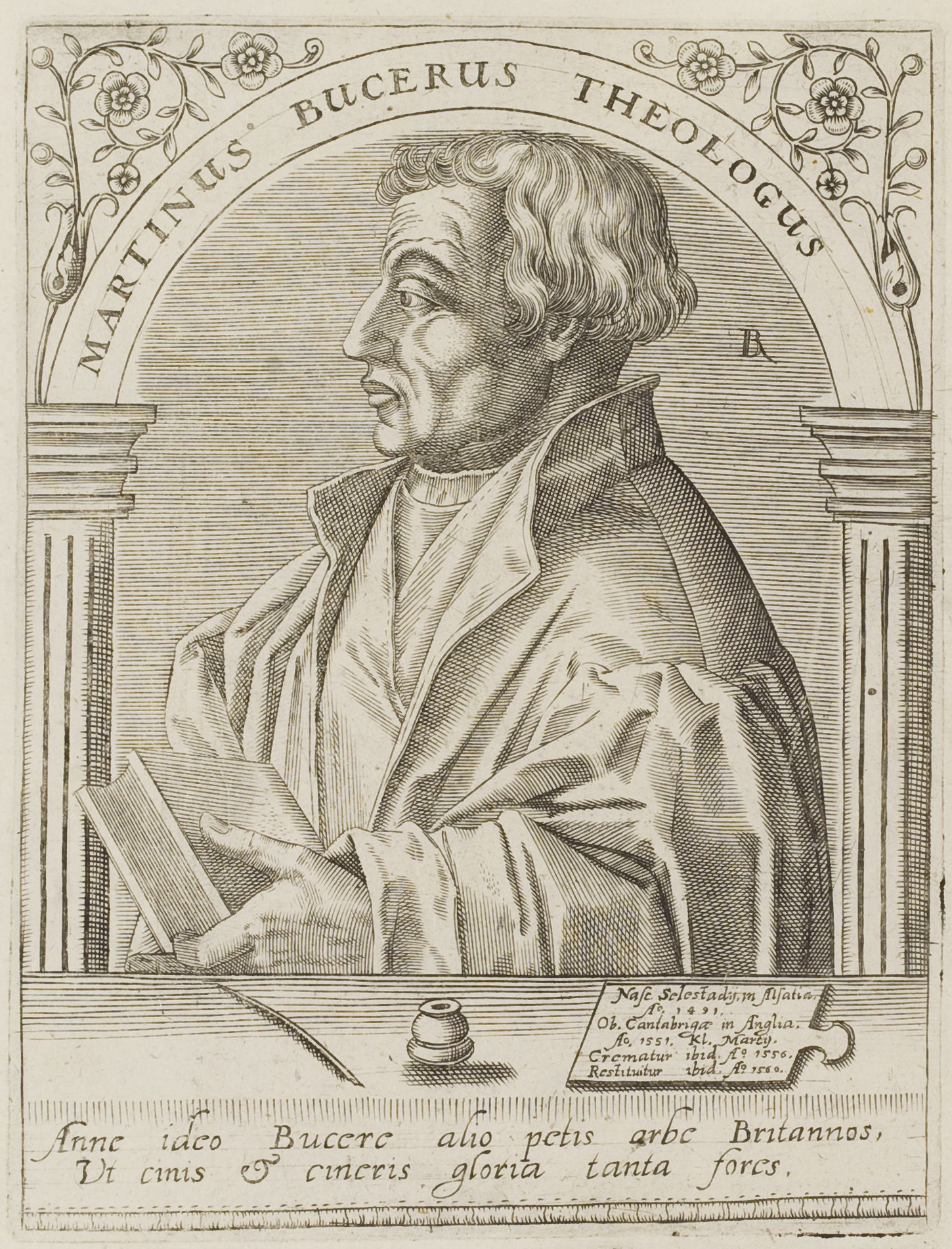
Martin Bucer, one of the Sacramentarians

Martin Luther had controversies with "Sacramentarians", and he published against them, for example, in his The Sacrament of the Body and Blood of Christ—Against the Fanatics and Confession Concerning Christ's Supper. Philipp I of Hessen arranged the Marburg Colloquy in 1529, but no agreement could be reached concerning the doctrine of Real Presence. Subsequently, the Wittenberg Concord of 1536 was signed, but this attempt at resolving the issue ultimately failed.

While Lutheranism had weakened after the Schmalkaldic War and Interim controversies, the Calvinist Reformation was spreading across Europe. Calvinists wanted to help Lutherans to give up "remnants of popery", as they saw it. By this time Calvinism had expanded its influence to southern Germany (not least because of the work of Martin Bucer), but the Peace of Augsburg (1555) had given religious freedom in Germany only to Lutherans, and it was not officially extended to Calvinists until the Treaty of Westphalia in 1648. While Bullinger, Zwingli's successor, had, in 1549, accepted Calvin's much less radical view of Christ's presence in the Lord's Supper (that is, that the Eucharist was more than a sign and that Christ was truly present in it and was received by faith), Calvinist theologians thought that Lutheran theology also had changed its view of the Real Presence because the issue was not discussed anymore, and Philippist teaching gave some justification to this conclusion.

== Philippism ==
=== Modern use of the term crypto-Philippist ===
Beginning in the 20th century, some scholars began using the term crypto-Philippist in place of the word crypto-Calvinist. However, there is no change in the meaning of the term.

=== History ===
When Luther died in 1546, his closest friend and ally, Philipp Melanchthon, became the leading Lutheran theologian of the Protestant Reformation. He was by training not a theologian but rather a classics scholar, and his theological approach became more or less irenic both toward Catholicism and toward Calvinism, an approach that his disciples, called Philippists, also followed. This attitude towards the Reformed doctrine of the Eucharist had become evident already in 1540, when Melanchthon had published another version of the Augsburg Confession ("Variata"), in which the article on the Real Presence differed essentially from what had been expressed in 1530. The wording is as follows:

- Edition of 1530: "Concerning the Lord's Supper, they teach that the body and blood of Christ are truly present, and are distributed (communicated) to those that eat in the Lord's Supper; and they disapprove of those that teach otherwise."
- "Variata" edition of 1540: "Concerning the Lord's Supper, they teach that with bread and wine are truly exhibited the body and blood of Christ to those that eat in the Lord's Supper."

The altered edition was made the basis of negotiations with the Roman Catholics at the Colloquies of Worms and Ratisbon in 1541, and at the later Colloquies in 1546 and 1557. It was printed (with the title and preface of the Invariata) in Corpus Doctrinae Philippicum in 1559; it was expressly approved by the Lutheran princes at the Convention of Naumburg in 1561, after Melanchthon's death, as an improved modification and authentic interpretation of the Confession, and was adhered to by the Melanchthonians and the Reformed even after the adoption of the Book of Concord (1580). John Calvin also signed it. However, it did not have the legal status given to the original version by the Peace of Augsburg.

=== Second Sacramentarian Controversy ===
The Real Presence for Luther was beyond any doubt: The host consecrated is Christ's body, while for Melanchthon the words spoken during the establishment by Jesus only promised that his body and blood were received. Melanchthon rejected the doctrine of ubiquity and spoke about the personal presence of Christ in the Eucharist, without any further definitions. The theology of Melanchthon's school in general was opposed by Lutherans, who were called Flacians by their opponents. Later they were called "Gnesio-Lutherans". Matthias Flacius had been the leader against Philippism in earlier controversies, but even Gnesio-Lutherans did not pay much attention to the doctrine of the Eucharist until Joachim Westphal began, in 1552, to write against those who denied the Real Presence. When John Calvin himself answered him in 1555, there was open, inter-Protestant controversy about Eucharist, which involved Lasco, Bullinger, Ochino, Valerandus Polanus, Beza, and Bibliander on the Reformed side and Timann, Heshusius Paul von Eitzen, Schnepff, E. Alberus, Gallus, Flacius, Judex, Brenz, and Andreä on the Lutheran side. The Colloquy of Worms in 1557 was an attempt to achieve unity among Lutherans, but it failed.

During these controversies the State Church of the Electorate of the Palatinate, where Philippism predominated, changed from the Lutheran to the Reformed faith under Frederick III (1560). The Heidelberg Catechism, which was written there, was also meant to form bridges between Lutherans and Reformed in Germany – one of its authors, Zacharias Ursinus, was Melanchthon's disciple.

=== Great Adoration Controversy ===
There were a number of local controversies, such as the Saligerian Controversy in Lübeck in 1568 and 1574, a controversy in Rostock in 1569, a controversy in Bremen in 1554 involving Melanchthon's friend Albert Rizaeus Hardenberg, and a controversy in Danzig in 1561–1562.

The earliest of these incidents had happened with Simon Wolferinus, pastor of St. Andreas at Eisleben in 1543, while Martin Luther still lived. The controversy was also about eucharistic adoration, which was defended by "Gnesio-Lutherans" and also many other Lutherans outside of the Flacian party, including Johann Hachenburg, Andreas Musculus, Jakob Rungius, and Laurentius Petri. This belief was shared by Nikolaus Selnecker, Martin Chemnitz, and Timotheus Kirchner. A feast of victory of genuine Lutheranism over Philippism was celebrated in one of the German principalities with prayers for the preservation of the doctrine of justification and the doctrine of the adoration of the Sacrament. Paul Eber was one of the main Philippist opponents of eucharistic adoration.

== In Saxony ==
Controversy about crypto-Calvinism inside of Lutheran Church divides into two stages: 1552–1574 and 1586–1592. It was the most bitter of all controversies after Luther's death.

Crypto-Calvinists had gained the ecclesiastical power in Saxony during the rule of Elector Augustus, but the unquestionably Calvinistic work of Joachim Cureus, Exegesis perspicua de sacra cœna (1574) and a confidential letter of Johann Stössel that fell into the elector's hands opened his eyes. The heads of the Philippist party were imprisoned and roughly handled, and the Torgau Confession of 1574 completed their downfall. Caspar Peucer, not incidentally Melanchthon's son-in-law, was captured and jailed for 12 years in the Königstein Fortress for Crypto-Calvinism. Their cause was thwarted in those territories that adopted the Formula of Concord, although in some others it survived under the aspect of a modified Lutheranism, as in Nuremberg, or, as in Nassau, Hesse, Anhalt, and Bremen, where it became more or less definitely identified with Calvinism.

Crypto-Calvinism raised its head once more in the Electorate of Saxony in 1586, on the accession of Christian I, but on his death five years later it came to a sudden and bloody end with the Leipzig Calvinist storm and the murder of Nikolaus Krell as a victim to this unpopular revival of Calvinism.

== In Scandinavia ==
In Denmark crypto-Calvinism was represented by Niels Hemmingsen. In Sweden, crypto-Calvinism, which was resisted by Archbishop Olaus Martini, was supported by Duke Charles, uncle of Catholic king Sigismund III Vasa. Calvinism was finally banned at the Uppsala Synod of 1593 by the initiative of Bishop of Turku, Ericus Erici Sorolainen, and Bishop Olaus Stephani Bellinus.

== Later history and evaluation ==
Following the Prussian Union and other Evangelical unions in Germany, today's Evangelical Church in Germany is an umbrella organisation of Lutheran, Union, and Reformed church bodies. The Leuenberg Concord (1962) made a similar irenic solution between Lutheran and Calvinist doctrines, while Confessional Lutheran church bodies still continue to see Calvinist teaching on the Lord's Supper as a danger to Lutheran faith and identity.

== See also ==
- Crypto-Protestantism
- Eucharistic theologies contrasted
- Saxon Visitation Articles
- Receptionism
- Nicodemite

== Bibliography ==
- Bouman, Herbert (1977), "Retrospect and Prospect", Sixteenth Century Journal, 8 (4): 84–104, doi:10.2307/2539395, JSTOR 2539395.
- Brandes, Friedrich (1873), Der Kanzler Krell, ein Opfer des Orthodoxismus (in German).
- Diestelmann, Jürgen (1997), Actio Sacramentalis. Die Verwaltung des Heiligen Abendmahles nach den Prinzipien Martin Luthers in der Zeit bis zur Konkordienformel (PDF) (in German), Groß-Ösingen: Luther in BS, archived from the original (PDF) on 2011-02-20.
- ——— (2007), Usus und Actio – Das Heilige Abendmahl bei Luther und Melanchthon (PDF) (in German), Berlin: Luther in BS, archived from the original (PDF) on 2011-02-21.
- Froner, Hans v (1919), "Der Kryptocalvinismus Wittenbergs", in Weißenborn, Bernhard (ed.), Die Universität Halle-Wittenberg [The Halle-Wittenberg University] (in German), Berlin: Furche.
- Hasse, Hans-Peter, ed. (2004), 'Caspar Peucer (1525–1602): Wissenschaft, Glaube und Politik im konfessionellen Zeitalter (in German), Leipzig: EVA.
- Hardt, Tom GA (1971), "Venerabilis et adorabilis Eucharistia. En Studie i den lutherska Nattvardsläran under 1500-talet", Studia Doctrinae Christianae Upsaliensia, Acta Universitatis Uppsaliensis (in Swedish), 9, Uppsala.
- ——— (1988), "Venerabilis et adorabilis Eucharistia. Eine Studie über die lutherische Abendmahlslehre im 16. Jahrhundert", Forschungen zur Kirchen-und Dogmengeschichte (in German), Göttingen: Band 42.
- ———, The Sacrament of the Altar, America online, archived from the original on June 10, 2001. A book on the Lutheran Doctrine of the Lord's Supper]
- Henke, Ernst Ludwig Theodor (1865), Caspar Peuker und Nikolaus Krell (in German), Marburg: Elwert.
- Koch, Uwe, ed. (2002), Zwischen Katheder, Thron und Kerker: Leben und Werk des Humanisten Caspar Peucer (in German), Bautzen: Domowina.
- Luther, Martin (2000) [1529, The Large Catechism], Kolb, Robert (ed.), The Book of Concord: The Confessions of the Evangelical Lutheran Church, Fortress Press
- Richard, August Victor (1859), Der kurfürstlich sächsische Kanzler Dr. Nikolas Crell (in German), 2 vols.
- Roebel, Marin (2005), Humanistische Medizin und Kryptocalvinismus. Leben und Werk... Caspar Peucers (PDF) (MD/PhD thesis) (in German), DE: University of Heidelberg.
- Saran, G (1879), "Der Kryptocalvinismus in Kursachsen und Dr. Nikolaus Krell", DEBI (in German): 596–614.
