= Matija Grbić =

German philologist

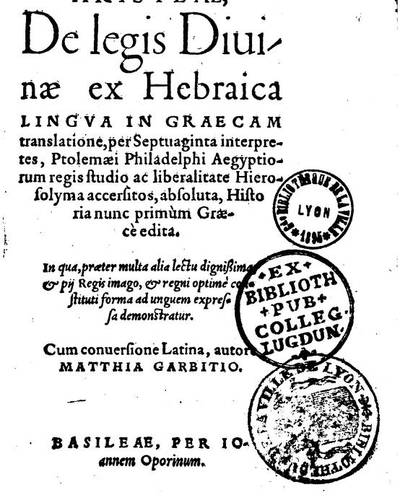
De legis Diui nae ex Hebraica by Matthia Garbitio (Matija Grbić)

Matthias Garbitius or Matija Grbić (also Matthias Illyricus; around 1505 – 1559) was a German humanist, classical philologist and translator. Born in Istria, he emigrated to Nuremberg. Between 1545 and 1557 he was the dean of the philosophical faculty at the University of Tübingen. He is the first known Protestant from the Balkans.

== Life ==
He was born in Istria, from whence he moved to Nuremberg as a pauper. There, he was welcomed by Joachim Camerarius the Elder, who was to become the first biographer of Melanchton and a great friend of Garbitius, and taught the Greek language at the Aegidianum, the first evangelical gymnasium. He met Melanchthon when the latter delivered a speech at the opening ceremony of the school. The two would develop a friendship that is reflected in Melanchthon's correspondence.

He then studied at the University of Heidelberg and switched to the University of Wittenberg on May 6, 1534. Here he became a protégé of Martin Luther and a student of Philip Melanchthon. Melanchthon praised his pupil in his letters. According to Tübingen professor Georg Lieber: "Melanchthon had developed great respect for his talented student, and was especially proud of his thorough knowledge of Greek. Garbitius was often a guest in the homes of Luther and Melanchthon during his stay in Wittenberg.

In September 1534 he obtained the academic degree of a master's degree. On Melanchthon's recommendation, he was appointed professor of Greek literature at the University of Wittenberg. In his classes he interpreted the works of Aristotle, Homer and Sophocles, and became increasingly interested in ethics. Beside lecturing on the Greek classics, he composed and published poetry himself, both in Greek and Latin. His longest piece of poetry is a 82-couplet epithalamium wrote for the wedding of Melanchthon's daughter Anna in 1536. In 1537 he was appointed professor of Greek language and ethics at the University of Tübingen.

Because of his evangelical sentiments, he had to put up with professional criticism at a church visit in Tübingen. Nevertheless, he remained in office until the end of his life. Between 1545 and 1557 he was the dean of the philosophical faculty (facultas artium) at the University of Tübingen.

He helped Matthias Flacius when the latter moved to Tübingen, receiving him into his house. Flacius, who was from Labin (Albona), Istria, called him "fellow countryman" (conterraneous) in his writings. Melanchthon referred to him as a compatriot of Jerome, who is believed to have been born in the Istrian peninsula. He tried to assist his young protégé in the same way as Melanchthon and Camerarius had assisted him, introducing Flacius to many prominent people. Both he and Camerarius saw potential in Flacius, and together they decided to send him to Wittenberg to continue his studies there.

He didn't take sides in the conflict between Flacius and Melanchthon of the 1550s, but rather "stayed neutral, and therefore exercised a more irenic spirit."

He translated Hesiod's poem Works and Days into Latin (Basel 1559), and Aeschylus' Prometheus (Basel 1559) with extensive philological and cultural commentaries. He translated and commented two other works from Greek into Latin, which were published posthumously: Aristeae, De Legis Divinae et Hebraica lingua in Graecam translatione (Basel 1561) and Dionysius Halicarnasseus, De Thucydidis historia (Basel 1579). He composed occasional speeches, of which he published an introduction to his lectures on morality, Oratio et docrina morum et vitae (Tübingen 1545), and a speech on Hippocrates, Oratio de vita, moribus, doctrina et professione Hippocratis (Tübingen 1546).

== Literature ==
- Heinz Scheible: Melanchthons Briefwechsel Personen 12. Stuttgart-Bad Cannstatt 2005 ISBN 3-7728-2258-4
- Julius Köstlin: Die Baccaulaurei und Magistri der Wittenberger philosophischen Fakultät 1518–1537. Halle (Saale) 1888
- Karl Eduard Förstemann: Album Academiae Vitebergensis. Leipzig 1841
- Karl August Klüpfel: Garbitius, Matthias. In: Allgemeine Deutsche Biographie (ADB). Band 8, Duncker & Humblot, Leipzig 1878, p. 367.
- Luka Ilić, Praeceptor Humanissimus et duo Illyri: Garbitius et Flacius. In: Philipp Melanchthon: Lehrer Deutschlands, Reformator Europas, Leipzig 2011, 65-80.
