= Pavel Aquilinas =

Pavel Aquilinas (also Vorličný or Aquilinus) (before 1520 – c. 1569) was a Czech Protestant theologian, pedagogist, humanistic poet and translator.

He is one of co-authors of the Moravian Confession.
