= Adiaphora =

Concepts in philosophy and religion

Adiaphoron (/ædɪˈæfərɒn, ædiˈæfərɒn/; plural: adiaphora; from the Greek ἀδιάφορον (pl. ἀδιάφορα), meaning 'not different or differentiable') is the negation of διαφορά diaphora, 'difference'.

== In Ancient Greek philosophy ==
In Cynicism, adiaphora represents indifference to the vicissitudes of life through ascetic practices which help one become free from influences – such as wealth, fame, and power – that have no value in nature. Examples include Diogenes' practice of living in a tub and walking barefoot in winter.

Similarly, the Stoics distinguish all the objects of human pursuit into three classes: good, bad, and adiaphora (indifferent). Virtue, wisdom, justice, temperance, and the like, are denominated good; their opposites were bad. Besides these there are many other objects of pursuit such as wealth, fame, etc., of themselves neither good nor bad. These are thought therefore in ethics to occupy neutral territory, and are denominated "adiaphora". This distinction amounts practically to an exclusion of the adiaphora from the field of morals. In the context of Stoicism adiaphora is usually translated as "indifference".

Unlike in Stoicism and Cynicism, In Pyrrhonism adiaphora has no specific connection to morality, but indicates things that cannot be logically differentiated, while Aristotle uses "adiaphora" to mean "undifferentiated by a logical διαφορά/differentia."

== Christianity ==
In Christianity, adiaphora are matters not regarded as essential to faith, but nevertheless as permissible for Christians or allowed by the church. What is specifically considered adiaphora depends on the specific theology in view.

=== Lutheranism ===
The issue of what constituted adiaphora became a major dispute during the Protestant Reformation. In 1548, two years after the death of Martin Luther, the Holy Roman Emperor Charles V tried to unite Catholics and Protestants in his realm with a law called the Augsburg Interim. This was rejected by Philipp Melanchthon, because it did not ensure justification by faith as a fundamental doctrine. Later, he was persuaded to accept a compromise known as the Leipzig Interim, deciding that doctrinal differences not related to justification by faith were adiaphora or matters not essential for salvation. Melanchthon's compromise was vehemently opposed by Matthias Flacius and his followers in Magdeburg, who went to the opposite extreme by claiming that adiaphora cease to be such in a case of scandal and confession. By 1576, both extremes were rejected by the majority of Lutherans led by Martin Chemnitz and the formulators of the Formula of Concord.

In 1577, the Formula of Concord was crafted to settle the question of the nature of genuine adiaphora, which it defined as church rites that are "neither commanded nor forbidden in the Word of God". However, the Formula added that believers should not yield even in matters of adiaphora when these are being forced upon them by the "enemies of God's Word".

The Lutheran Augsburg Confession states that true unity of the church is enough to allow for agreement, concerning the doctrine of the Gospel and administration of the Lutheran sacraments. It also posits that merely human traditions, namely extrabiblical rites or ceremonies, need not be the same across all congregations.

=== Puritanism ===
The Westminster Confession of Faith distinguishes between elements or acts of worship (worship proper) and the circumstances of worship. The elements of worship must be limited to what has positive warrant in scripture, a doctrine known as the regulative principle of worship. In this framework, the elements of worship have included praise (the words and manner of music), prayer, preaching and teaching from the Christian Bible, the taking of vows, and the two sacraments of baptism and the Lord's Supper, while the circumstances of worship have included the building and its necessary furniture and the time of day for worship.

The circumstances of worship are considered adiaphora, although they must be observed for the edification of others and to promote peace and order. According to the Westminster Confession 20.2, the conscience is left free in general belief and behavior within the realm of whatever is not contrary to the Word. However, specifically concerning worship and religious faith, the conscience is free from whatever is "besides" scripture; that is, one is free to worship and believe only according to whatever has positive warrant in scripture.

Presbyterians who have subscribed to the Westminster Confession, for instance, sometimes considered the questions of musical instruments and of the singing of hymns (as opposed to exclusive psalmody) not drawn directly from the Christian Bible as related to the elements of worship, as not optional circumstances. Thus, they rejected musical instruments and hymns because they believed these were neither commanded by scripture nor deduced by good and necessary consequence from it. However, adherence to such a position is rare among modern Presbyterians.

The Puritan position on worship is thus in line with the common saying regarding adiaphora: "In necessary things, unity; in doubtful things, liberty; in all things, charity."

=== Latitudinarianism in Anglicanism ===
Latitudinarianism was initially a pejorative term applied to a group of 17th-century English theologians who believed in conforming to official Church of England practices, but who felt that matters of doctrine, liturgical practice, and ecclesiastical organization were of relatively little importance. Good examples of the latitudinarian philosophy were found among the Cambridge Platonists. The latitudinarian Anglicans of that period built on Richard Hooker's position in Of the Laws of Ecclesiastical Polity, which states God cares about the moral state of the individual soul and that matters such as church leadership are "things indifferent". However, they took the position far beyond Hooker's own and extended it to doctrinal matters.

== See also ==
- Ataraxia – Concept in Hellenistic philosophy
- Evangelical counsels – Poverty, (perfect) chastity, and obedience
- Heterodoxy – Opinions or practices which vary from official positions
- Lex orandi, lex credendi – Principle of the relationship between belief and prayer in Christian tradition
- Orthodoxy – Adherence to the actual accepted belief, especially in religion
- Theologoumenon – Statement lacking absolute doctrinal authority
- Via Media – Latin phrase, a position that seeks middle ground between extremes of tradition and reform.

== Bibliography ==
- Waddell, James Alan (2005). The Struggle to Reclaim the Liturgy in the Lutheran Church: Adiaphora in Historical, Theological and Practical Perspective. Lewiston, NY: Mellen. ISBN 0-7734-5922-7..
- ——— (2009). A Simplified Guide to Worshiping As Lutherans. Eugene, OR: Wipf & Stock. Archived from the original on 2012-07-22..
