= Nicolaus von Amsdorf =

German Protestant reformer (1483–1565)

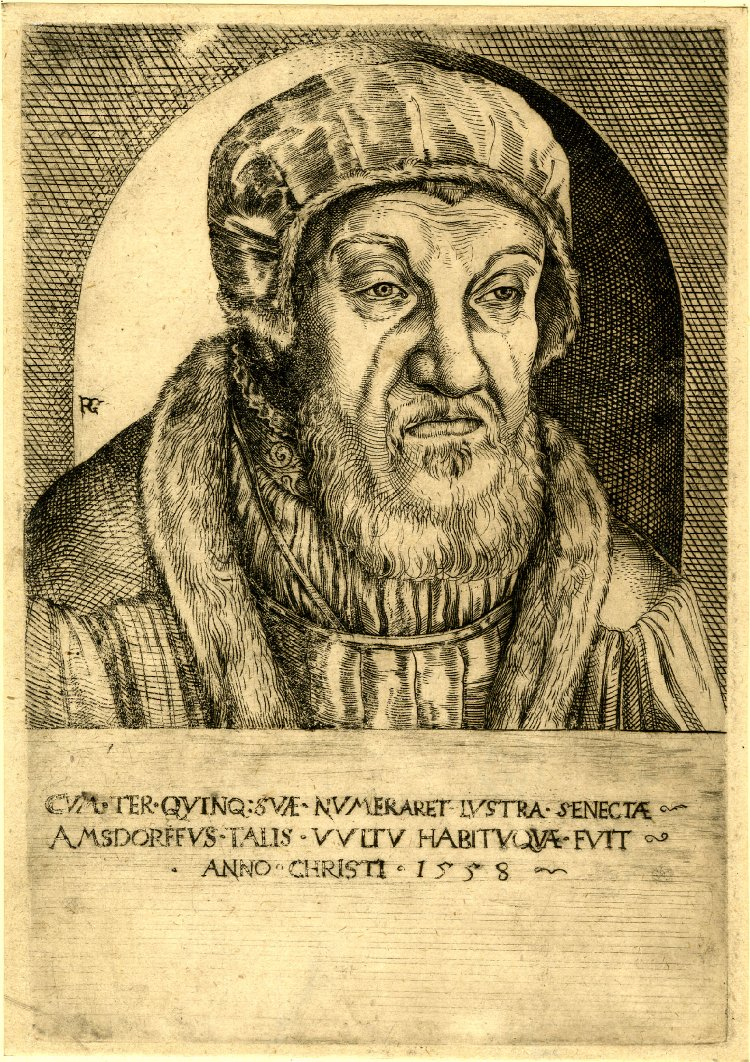
Nikolaus von Amsdorf, 1558 etching by Peter Gottlandt

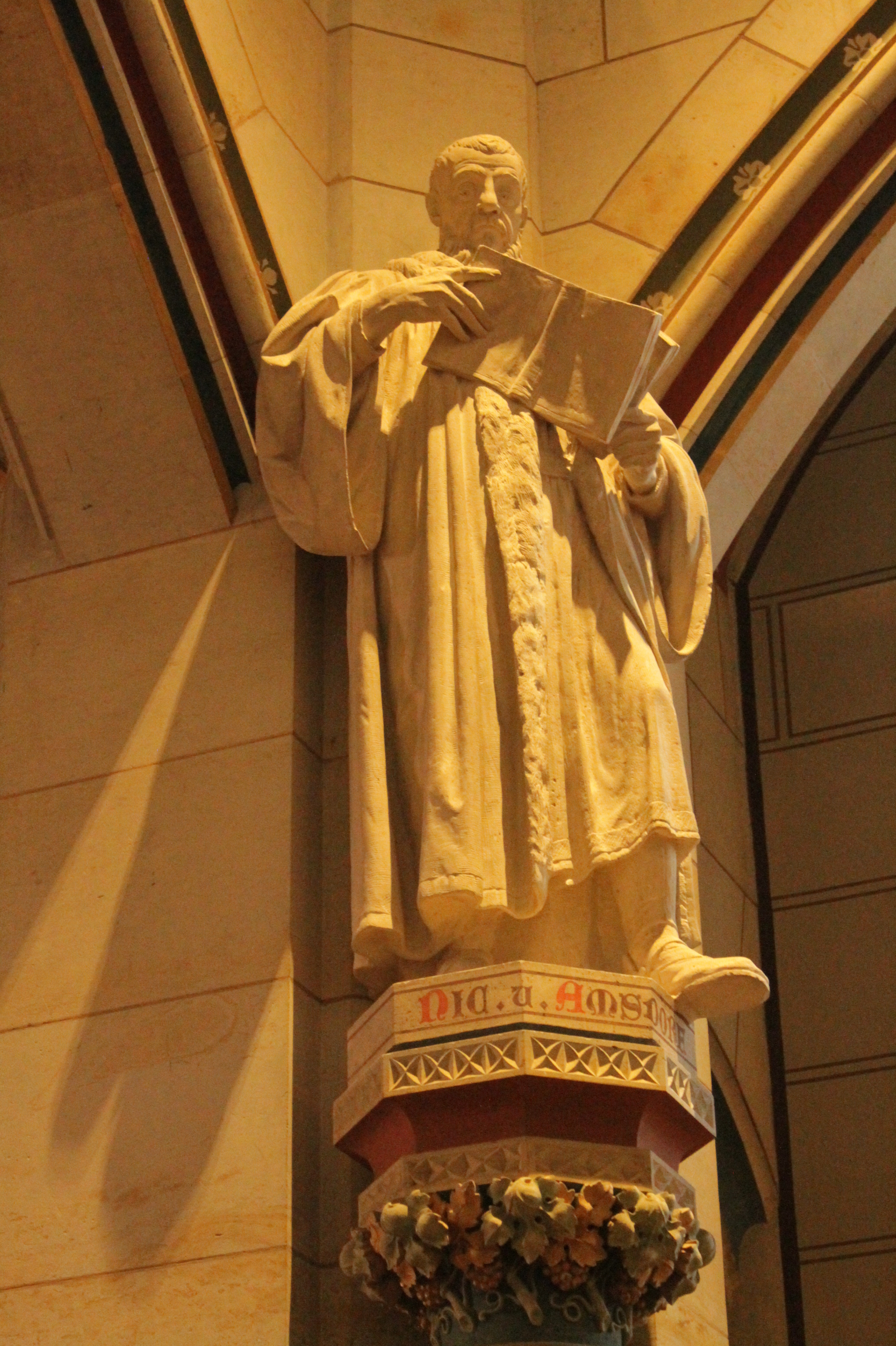
Statue of Nicolaus von Amsdorf, Schlosskirche, Wittenberg

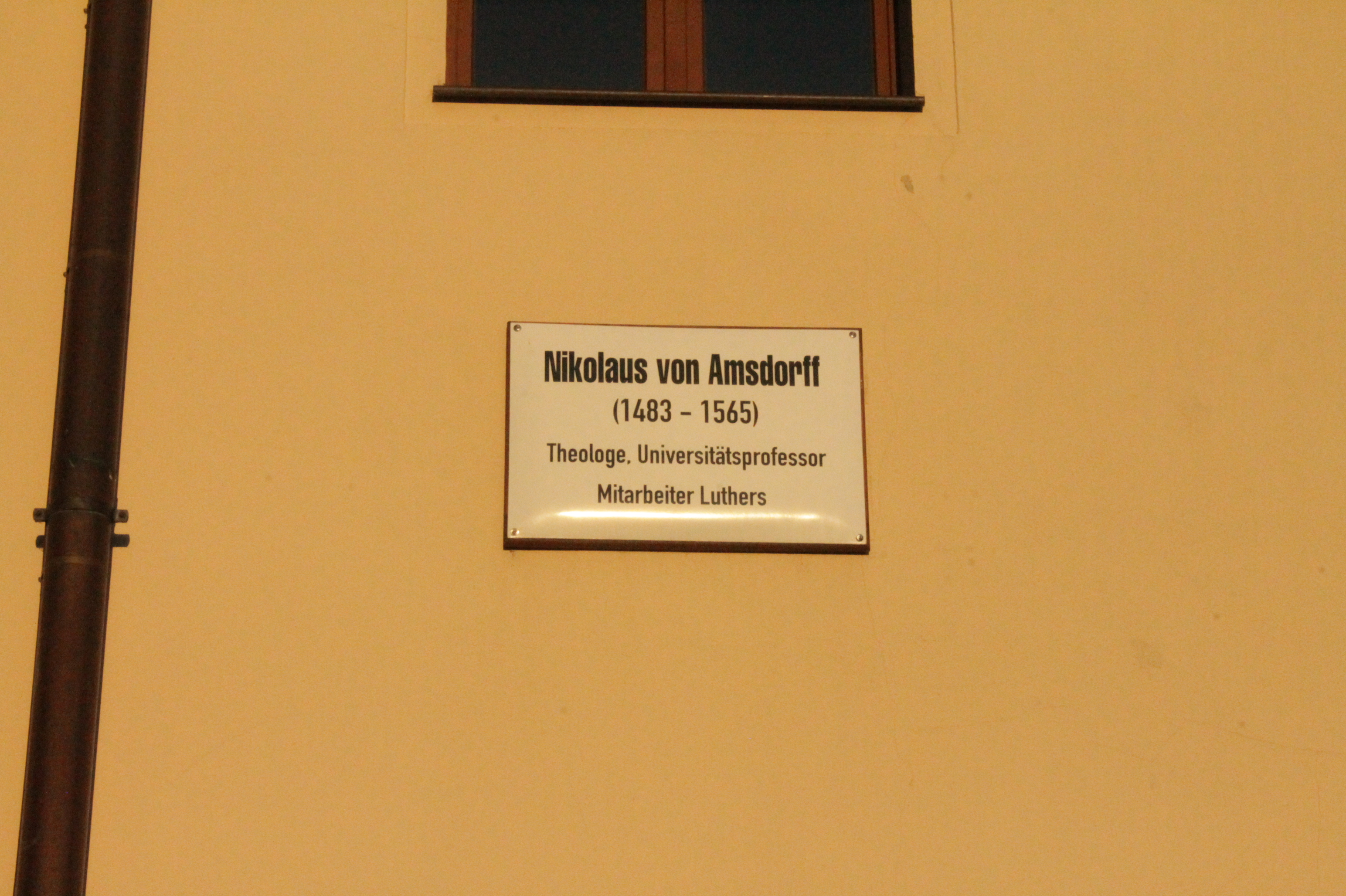
Plaque to Nicolaus von Amsdorf, quadrangle, Wittenberg University

Nicolaus von Amsdorf (Latin: Nicolaus Amsdorfius, 3 December 1483 – 14 May 1565) was a German Lutheran theologian and an early Protestant reformer. As bishop of Naumburg (1542–1546), he became the first Lutheran bishop in the Holy Roman Empire.

== Biography ==
He was born in Torgau, on the Elbe.

He was educated at Leipzig, and then at Wittenberg, where he was one of the first who matriculated (1502) in the recently founded university. He soon obtained various academic honours, and became professor of theology in 1511.

Like Andreas Karlstadt, he was at first a leading exponent of the older type of scholastic theology, but under the influence of Luther abandoned his Aristotelian positions for a theology based on the Augustinian doctrine of grace. Throughout his life he remained one of Luther's most determined supporters; he was with him at the Leipzig conference (1519), and the Diet of Worms (1521); and was privy to the secret of his Wartburg seclusion. He assisted the first efforts of the Reformation at Magdeburg (1524), at Goslar (1531) and at Einbeck (1534); took an active part in the debates at Schmalkalden (1537), where he defended the use of the sacrament by the unbelieving; and (1539) spoke out strongly against the bigamy of the Landgrave of Hesse.

After the death of Philip of the Palatinate, bishop of Naumburg-Zeitz, he was installed there on 20 January 1542, though in opposition to the chapter, by the Prince-elector of Saxony and Luther. His position was a painful one, and he longed to get back to Magdeburg, but was persuaded by Luther to stay. After Luther's death (1546) and the Battle of Mühlberg (1547) he had to yield to his rival, Julius von Pflug, and retire to the protection of the young duke of Weimar. Here he took part in founding Jena University (1558); opposed the "Augsburg Interim" (1548); superintended the publication of the Jena edition of Luther's works; and debated on the freedom of the will, original sin, and, more noticeably, on the Christian value of good works, in regard to which he held that they were not only useless, but prejudicial in the matter of man's salvation. He urged the separation of the High Lutheran party from Melanchthon (1557), got the Saxon dukes to oppose the Frankfurt Recess (1558) and continued to fight for the purity of Lutheran doctrine.

He died at Eisenach in 1565, and was buried in the church of St. Georg there, where his effigy shows a well-knit frame and sharp-cut features.

== Assessment ==
He exercised a decided influence on the Reformation. Many letters and other short productions of his pen are extant in manuscript, especially five volumes of Amsdorfiana, in the Weimar library. They are a valuable source for our knowledge of Luther. A small sect, which adopted his opinion on good works, was named after him; but it is now of mere historical interest.

== See also ==
- Amsdorfians
- Katharina von Bora

Nicolaus von Amsdorf Born: 3 December 1483 in Torgau Died: 14 May 1565 in Eisenach
Regnal titles
Titles in Lutheranism
Preceded by Philip of the Palatinate	Prince-Bishop of Naumburg; 1542–1546	Succeeded by Julius von Pflug
