= Johann Wigand =

German Lutheran cleric, Protestant reformer and theologian

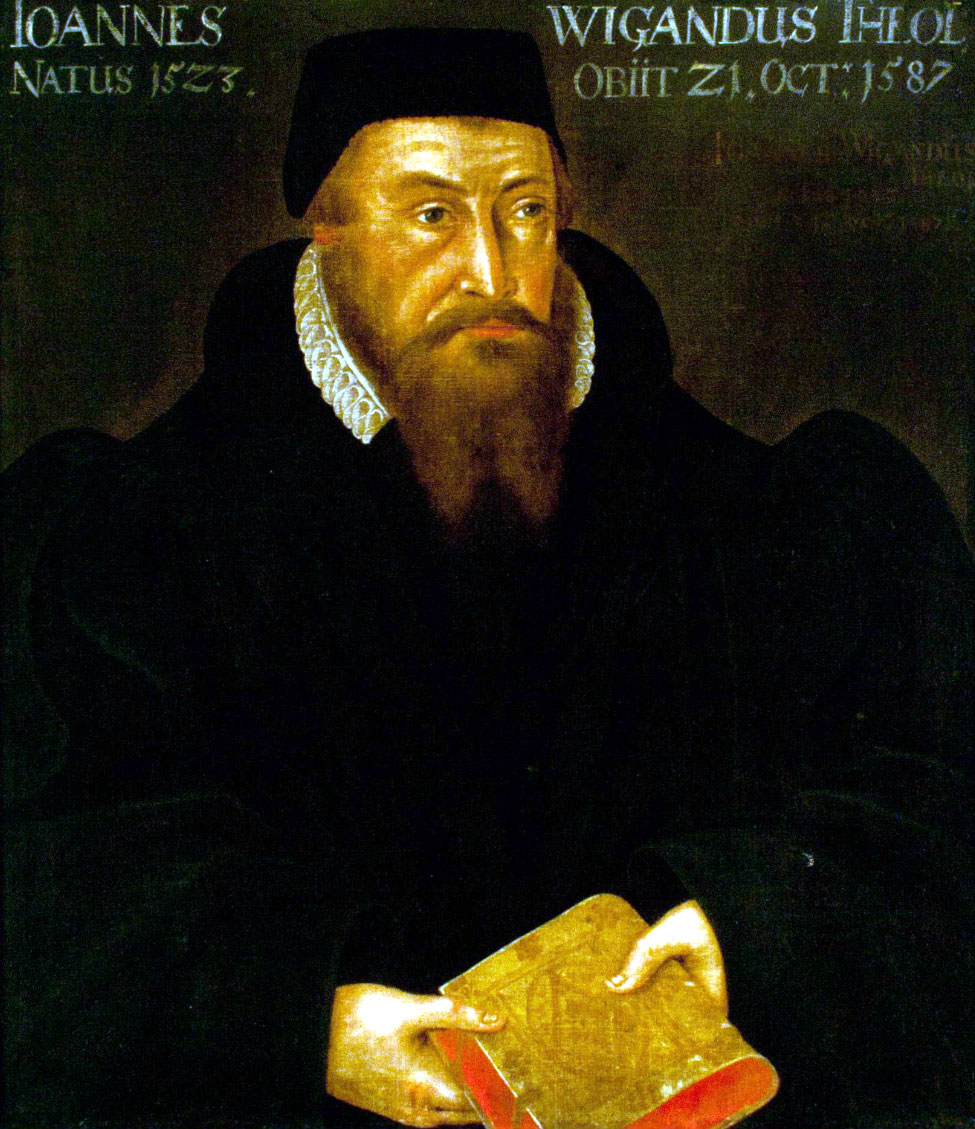
- Born: 1523
- Died: 21 October 1587 (aged 63–64)

Johann Wigand (Latin: Jo(h)annes Wigandus; c. 1523 – 21 October 1587) was a German Lutheran cleric, Protestant reformer and theologian. He served as Bishop of Pomesania.

Johann Wigand was born at Mansfeld in Saxony-Anhalt, Germany. He was raised within a Lutheran family. From 1538, Wigand studied at University of Wittenberg, attending lectures by Martin Luther and Philipp Melanchthon. While working in Magdeburg, he was one of the main contributors to the Magdeburg Centuries, a critical work on church history. In 1545, he graduated with a master's degree.

In 1546, he became pastor in his hometown. In 1553, he was appointed pastor at the Church of St. Ulrich (Sankt-Ulrich-und-Levin-Kirche) in Magdeburg. In 1560, he became a professor of theology at University of Jena in Thuringia. In 1563, Wigand received his Doctorate of Theology from the University of Rostock.

In 1573, August of Saxony took over the administration of Saxe-Weimar. Johann Wigand, together with nearly 100 pastors, including Tilemann Heshusius, were forced to leave the territory. Heshusius and Wigand went to Königsberg in East Prussia. In 1575, Wigand became Bishop of Pomesania, a post he held until his death in 1587.

He is commemorated in the botanical genus Wigandia.

== See also ==
- Gnesio-Lutherans

== Notes ==
- (in German) de:s:ADB:Wigand, Johann
