= Leipzig Interim =

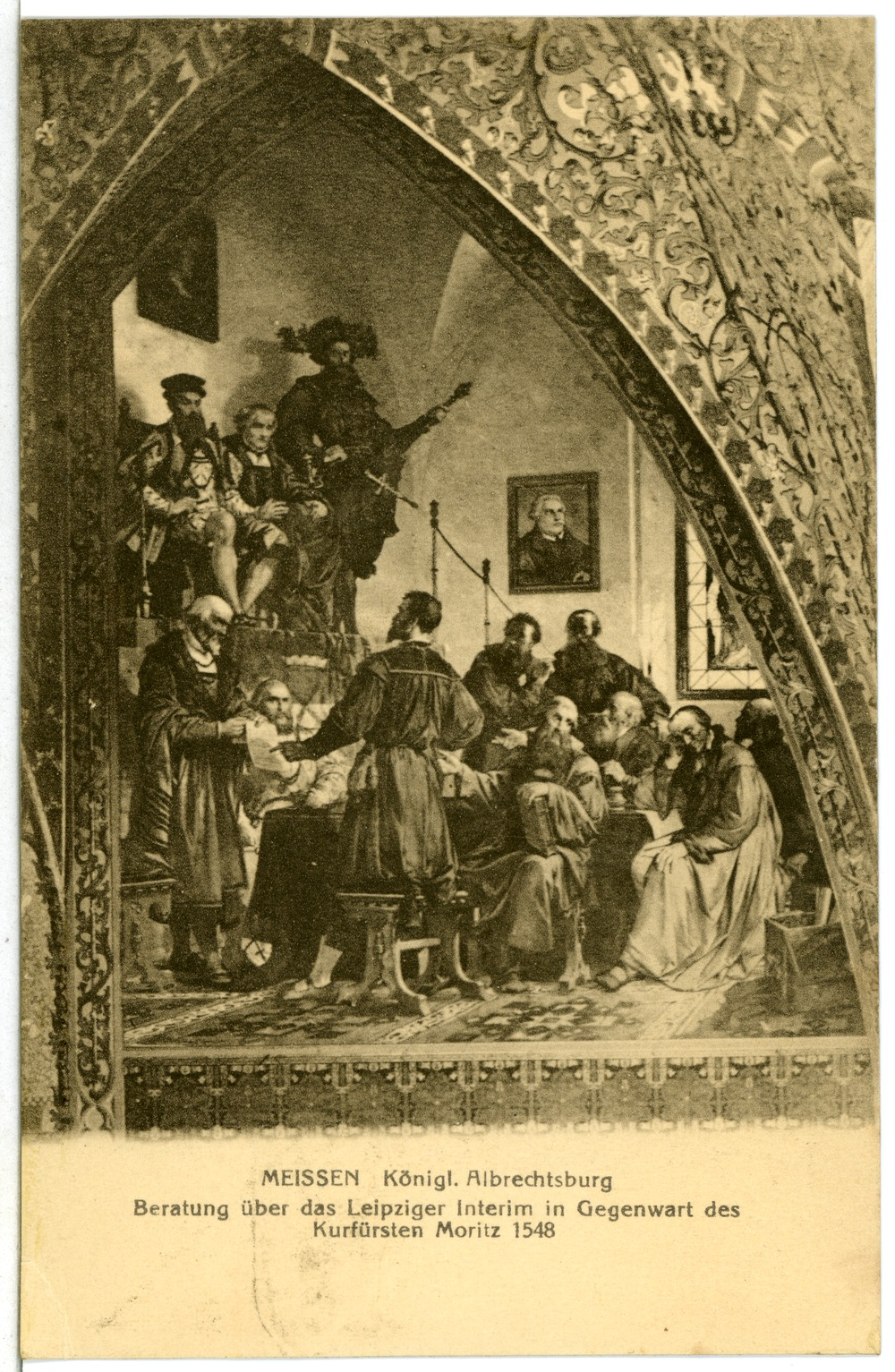
Meissen; Albrechtsburg - Consultation on the Leipzig interim (1910)

The Leipzig Interim was one of several temporary settlements between the Emperor Charles V and German Lutherans following the Schmalkaldic War. It was presented to an assembly of Saxon political estates in December 1548. Though not adopted by the assembly, it was published by its critics under the name "Leipzig Interim."

The earlier Augsburg Interim of 1548 met with strong opposition on the Lutheran side. In order to make it less objectionable, a modification was introduced by Melanchthon and other Protestant theologians, commissioned by Elector Maurice of Saxony. Over the course of several months, several meetings took place between Lutheran theologians, Roman Catholic leaders and political advisors, including a meeting held at Alt Zella in November 1548. The Lutherans attempted to explain their sense of what they considered essential points of doctrine, e.g. justification and others. They continued to negotiate on non-essentials or adiaphora, such as confirmation, the use of candles, vestments, holy days, etc.

The document was presented to the Saxon assembly held at Leipzig in December 1548; it was not adopted by the estates of the Electorate of Saxony, though some portions of it were later applied selectively to some regions in the land. Its final form was given by the political advisors and not by the theologians.

The controversies surrounding the Leipzig Interim caused a split in the Protestant side between Philippists and Gnesio-Lutherans, the so-called adiaphora controversies. In 1552 Moritz led a coalition against Charles V, which resulted in the Peace of Passau and finally the 1555 Augsburg Settlement, which made the Augsburg Interim and similar statements a dead letter.
