= Victorinus Strigel =

Philippist Lutheran theologian and Protestant reformer

Viktorin (Victorinus) Strigel (16 or 26 December 1524, Kaufbeuren — 26 June 1569, Heidelberg) was a Philippist Lutheran theologian and Protestant reformer.

== Life ==
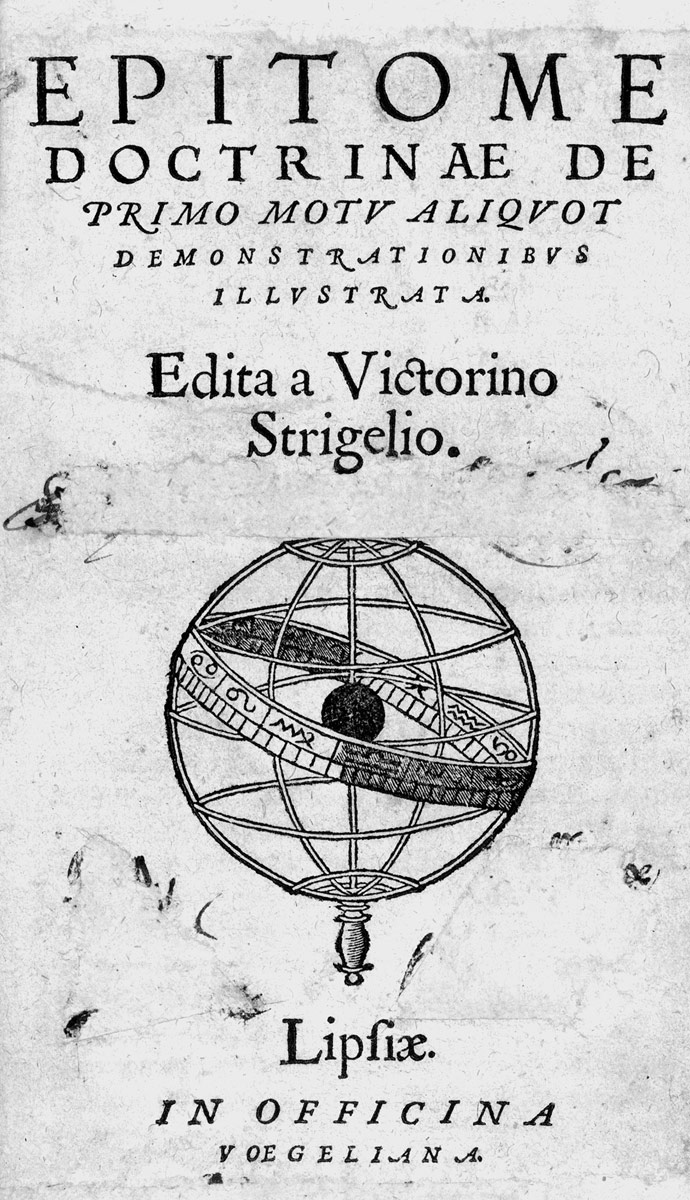
Epitome doctrinae de primo motu, Leipzig 1564

Victorinus Strigel was born 1524 in Kaufbeuren, the son of the physician Ivo Strigel. He attended the University of Freiburg in October 1542 and went to the University of Wittenberg to study philosophy and theology. There he became a follower of Philipp Melanchthon in 1544, earned a Master of Arts, and gave his own lectures. Due to the Schmalkaldic War, he fled with Melanchthon at first to Magdeburg and went to the University of Erfurt, where he also taught. From Erfurt, he was recommended to Jena, where he took part in the founding of the Gymnasium's academicum and from 20 March gave lectures on philosophy, history, and later on Melanchthon's Loci Communes.

He then continued his academic career as a professor and rector of the University of Jena. He supported the establishment of the university constitution. Strigel taught students in Jena in the abandoned Dominican monastery; this was the setting of the emergence of the "Collegium Jenense." With the appointment of Matthias Flacius 1557 Strigel entered into the dispute between the Gnesio-Lutherans and the Philippists, who tended toward the more mediating position of the followers of Melanchthon. In 1559 he was even taken into custody because of his theological views and suspended from duty. In 1562 he moved to the University of Leipzig to take a post, from there to Wittenberg, and finally to the University of Heidelberg in 1567, where he accepted the Reformed teaching of the Eucharist.

== Selected works ==
- Loci theologici 1581–84) Neustadt/Haardt
- Epistolae . . . de negocio Eucharistico scriptae ad amicos (1584) Neustadt/Haardt
- Epitome doctrinae de primo motu (1564) Leipzig
