= Colloquy of Worms (1557) =

The Colloquy of Worms was the last colloquy in the 16th century on an imperial level, held in Worms from September 11 to October 8, 1557. At the Diet of Augsburg in 1555 it had been agreed that the dialog on controversial religious issues should be continued. A resolution was passed at Regensburg in 1556, and the next colloquy took place in Worms in 1557. The Catholics Michael Helding, John Gropper, and Peter Canisius met with the Protestants Philip Melanchthon, Johannes Brenz and Erhard Schnepf. They first discussed the relation between the Bible and tradition. When Canisius mischievously alluded to differences among the Protestants themselves in their doctrine of original sin and justification, which they could not overcome, the meeting was dissolved.

Other participants present at this Colloquy included Julius von Pflug, Kaspar Schwenkfeld von Ossig, Johannes Pistorius, François Hotman, Maximilian Mörlin, and Theodore Beza.
