= Matthias Flacius =

Venetian theologian and Lutheran reformer (1520–1575)

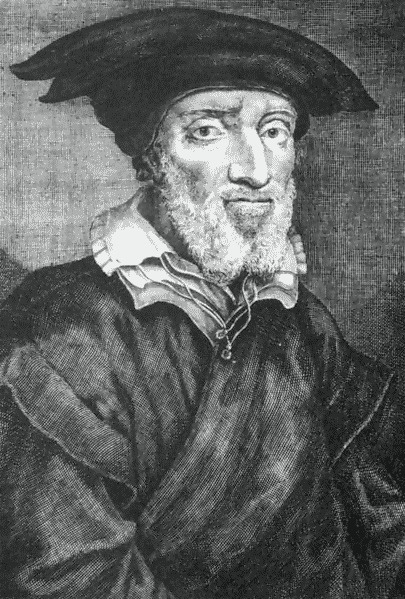
- Matthias Flacius Illyricus
- Born: Matthias Vlacich or Francovich; 3 March 1520; Labin, Venetian Republic (modern Croatia)
- Died: 11 March 1575 (aged 55); Free Imperial City of Frankfurt, Holy Roman Empire (Present day Germany)
- Other name: Matija Vlačić Ilirik (Franković)
- Occupations: Theologian, church historian, philosopher
- Years active: 1544–1575

Matthias Flacius Illyricus (Latin; Croatian: Matija Vlačić Ilirik) or Francovich (Croatian: Franković) (3 March 1520 – 11 March 1575) was a Lutheran reformer from Istria, present-day Croatia. He was notable as a theologian, sometimes dissenting strongly with his fellow Lutherans, and as a scholar for his editorial work on the Magdeburg Centuries.

== Biography ==
=== Early life and education ===
Flacius was born in Labin (Albona) in Istria, son of Andrea Vlacich (Andrija Vlačić (Note: Vlacich (Vlačić) is a surname typical of Labin, generally bore by its Slavic-speaking (Croat) inhabitants. Its etymology is not clear. It might be related to the term Vlach, a historical term from the Middle Ages that designates an exonym mostly for Eastern Romance-speaking peoples living in the Balkans.)) alias Francovich and Jacobea (Jakovica) Luciani, daughter of a wealthy and powerful Albonian civic family. Her family was related by marriage to the local Lupetino (Lupetina) family: Jacobea's brother, Luciano Luciani, married Ivanka Lupetina, the sister of the friar Baldo Lupetino (Lupetina), likewise born in Labin, who later was condemned to death in Venice for his Lutheran sympathies.

Andrea Vlacich was a small landowner, who died during his son's early childhood. Flacius went also by the name Franković. He matriculated at the University of Basel in 1539 under the name Mattheus de Francistis [Franković] de Albona. Further, he himself signed a payment slip at the University of Wittenberg as Mathias Francovich Illyricus. The origin of the double surname is not clear, but it might have been a double last name resulting from marriage, his or some of his ancestors'. Likewise, the 'Illyricus' is of uncertain origin, likely in reference to his place of origin, the historical province of Illyricum.

At the age of sixteen, Flacius went to study in Venice, where he was taught by the humanist Giambattista Cipelli (Baptista Aegnatius / Battista Egnazio). At the age of seventeen, he intended to join a monastic order, with a view to sacred learning. His intention, however, was diverted by his uncle-in-law, (Note: As mentioned, his uncle Luciano Luciani, married Ivanka Lupetina, the sister of the friar Baldo. Flacius himself calls Lupetino the "brother-in-law of his uncle (der Schwager meines Oheims)) Baldo Lupetina, provincial of the Franciscans and sympathetic to the Reformation cause, who convinced him to start a university career.

Flacius continued his studies in Basel in 1539, then went to Tübingen and finally ended up in Wittenberg, where in (1541) he was welcomed by Philip Melanchthon. In Tübingen, Flacius was received into the house of Matthias Garbitius (Matija Grbac) a humanist and a professor of Greek at the University of Tübingen, who, like Flacius, was from Istria, and was called "fellow countryman" (conterraneous) by Flacius. There he came under the influence of Martin Luther. In 1544, Flacius was appointed professor of Hebrew at Wittenberg. He finished his master's degree on 24 February 1546, ranking first among the graduates.

=== Career and teachings ===
Soon, Flacius was prominent in the theological discussions of the time, strenuously opposing the Augsburg Interim, and the compromise of Melanchthon known as the Leipzig Interim. Melanchthon wrote of him with venom as a renegade (aluimus in sinu serpentem, "we have nourished a snake in our bosom"). In 1549, Flacius moved to Magdeburg. On 7 May 1557, he was appointed professor of New Testament at the theological faculty in Jena but was soon involved in controversy with his colleague Victorinus Strigel on the synergistic question (relating to the function of the will in the conversion). He remained at the university between 1557 and 1562.

Affirming the natural inability of man, he adopted a position on sin as not being an accident of human nature, but involved in its substance, since The Fall of Man. Holding to a strong view of what Calvinists later called total depravity, Flacius insisted that human nature was entirely transformed by original sin, human beings were transformed from goodness and almost wholly corrupted with evil, making them kin to the Devil in his view, so that within them, without divine assistance, there lies no power even to cooperate with the Gospel when they hear it preached. Human acts of piety are valueless in themselves, and humans are entirely dependent on the grace of God for salvation. Those who agreed with him on this point, for example, Cyriacus Spangenberg, were termed Flacians.

Resisting ecclesiastical censure, he left Jena in December 1561 to found an academy at Regensburg. That assignment was not successful, so in October 1566 he accepted a call from the Lutheran community at Antwerp. Thence he was driven in early 1567 by the exigencies of war, and went to Frankfurt, where the authorities stood against him. He proceeded to Strasbourg where he was well received by the superintendent Johannes Marbach. Here again, his religious views caused controversies. The authorities ordered him to leave the city by May Day 1573. The prioress Catharina von Meerfeld of the Convent of White Ladies secretly harboured him and his family in Frankfurt where he fell ill and died on 11 March 1575.

=== Impact and aftermath ===
Flacius' life was eventful in a turbulent epoch. He represents in some sense a move in the direction of the scientific study of church history in the modern sense and similarly of hermeneutics, though no doubt his impelling motive was not dispassionate but polemical, namely to prove the false premises of Roman Catholicism. His characteristic formula, historia est fundamentum doctrinae ("History is the foundation of teaching"), is better understood now than in his own day.

According to Emil Petru Rațiu, the Moldovan president of the Andrei Glavina Cultural Association of the Istro-Romanians, Flacius could have been an ethnic Istro-Romanian. He based these claims on the fact that there used to be a notorious Istro-Romanian presence in Labin during the times in which Flacius lived, in the surname of his father ("Vlacich", which could originate from "Vlach" and have been Latinized as "Flacius") and other arguments.

=== Family life ===
In 1545, while at Wittenberg, Flacius married a pastor's daughter. He had twelve children with his first wife before she died in 1564. He remarried the same year in Regensburg and had six more children with his second wife. His son Matthias Flacius Junior was professor of logic and medicine at Rostock.

== Works ==
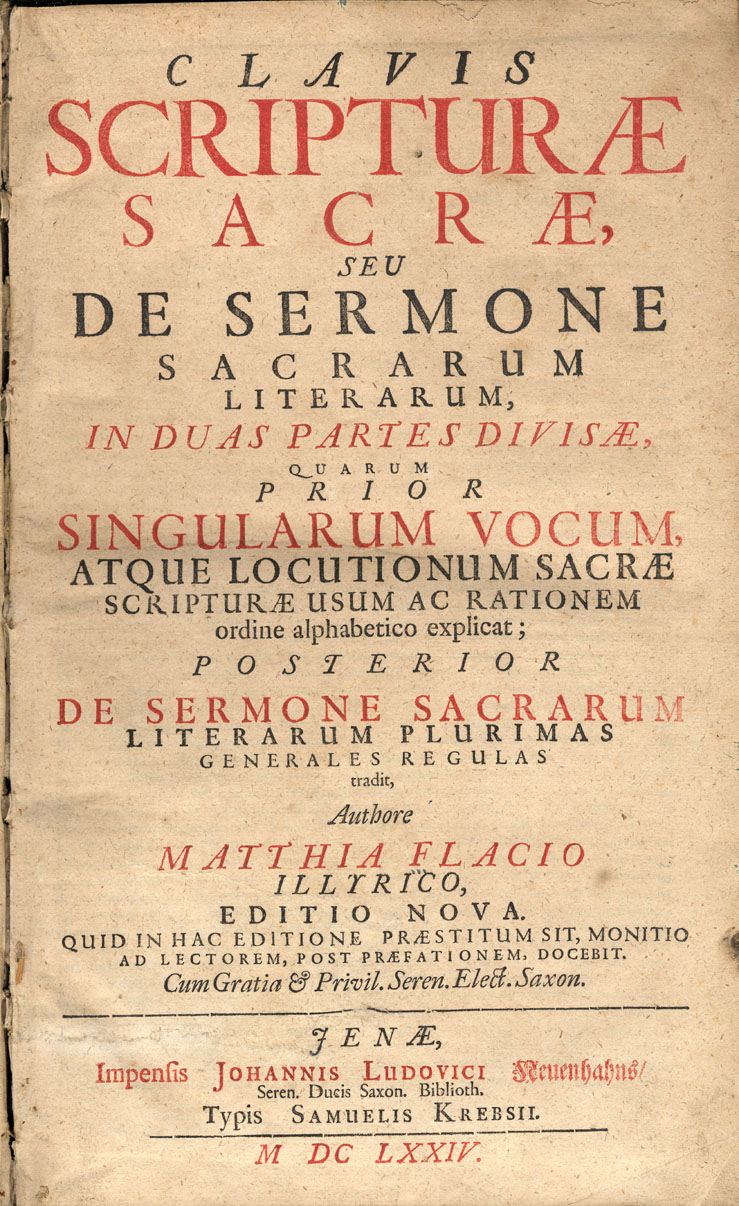
Clavis scripturae sacrae, 2nd edition, 1674

- De vocabulo fidei (1549)
- De voce et re fidei (1555)
- Antilogia Papae: hoc est, de corrupto Ecclesiae statu et totius cleri papistici perversitate, Scripta aliquot veterum authorum, ante annos plus minus CCC, et interea: nunc primum in lucem eruta, et ab interitu vindicata (1555)
- Catalogus testium veritatis, qui ante nostram aetatem reclamarunt Papae (1556)
- Confessio Waldensium (1568)
- Konfutationsbuch (1559)
- Ecclesiastica historia, integram Ecclesiae Christi ideam ... secundum singulas Centurias, perspicuo ordine complectens ... ex vetustissimis historicis ...congesta: Per aliquot studiosos et pios viros in urbe Magdeburgica (1559–1574)
- Clavis Scripturae Sacrae seu de Sermone Sacrarum literarum (1567)
- Glossa compendiaria in Novum Testamentum (1570)

== Sources ==
- Luka Ilić, Theologian of Sin and Grace. The Process of Radicalization in the Theology of Matthias Flacius Illyricus (2014)
- Oliver K. Olson, Matthias Flacius and the Survival of Luther's Reform (2000)
- Matthias Flacius Illyricus, Leben & Werk: Internationales Symposium, Mannheim (February 1991)
- J. B. Ritter, Flacius's Leben u. Tod (1725)
- M. Twesten, M. Flacius Illyricus (1844)
- Wilhelm Preger M. Flacius Illyricus u. seine Zeit (1859—1861)
- "Flacius, Matthias", in P. Schaff and J.J. Herzog, eds. New Schaff-Herzog Encyclopedia of Religious Knowledge, vol. 4 (1952), pp. 321–323.
- Franolić, Branko (1984). An Historical Survey of Literary Croatian. Nouv. éd. latines. ISBN 978-2-7233-0126-8.
