= Augsburg Interim =

1548 religious decree of Emperor Charles V

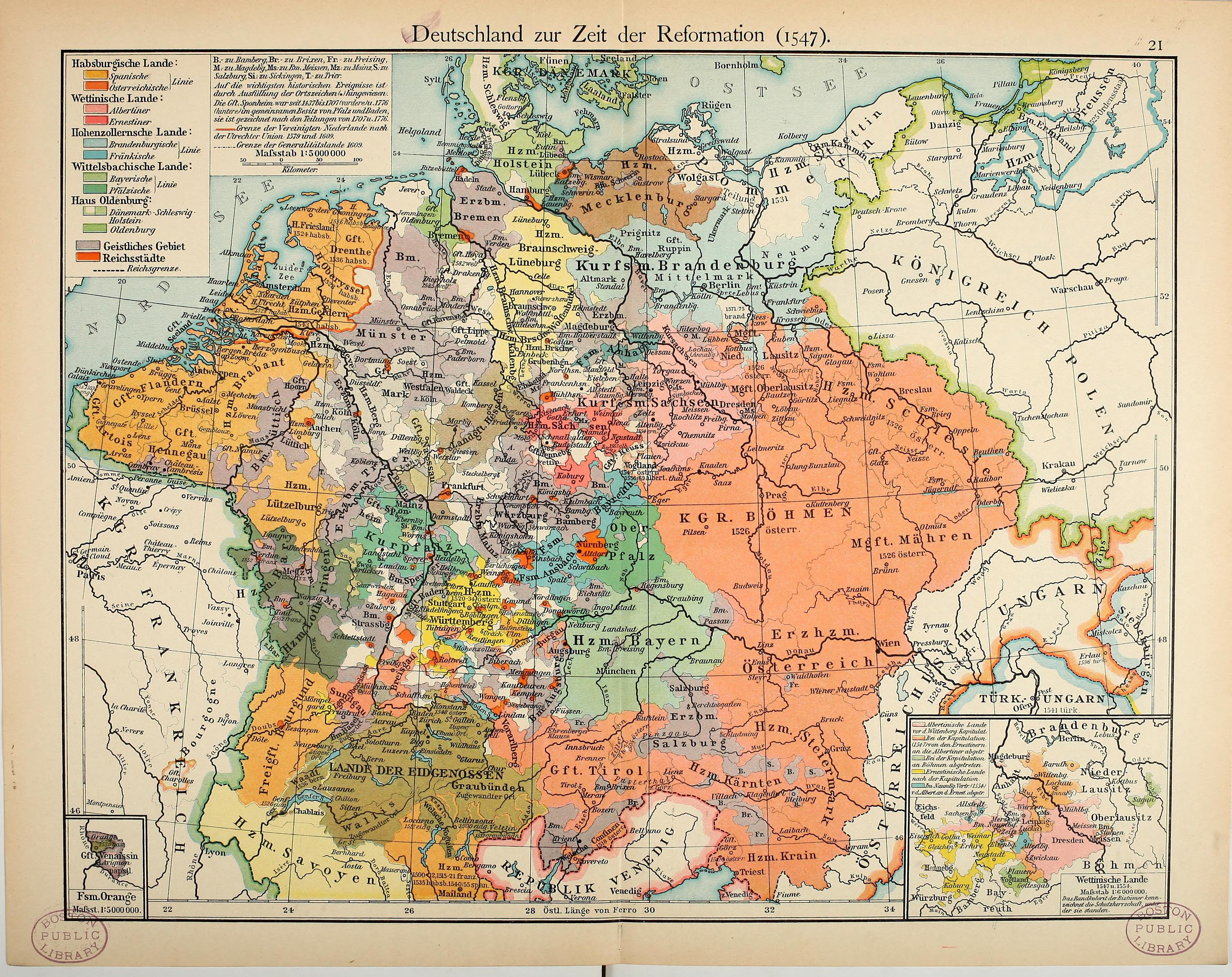
The Holy Roman Empire in 1547

The Augsburg Interim (full formal title: Declaration of His Roman Imperial Majesty on the Observance of Religion Within the Holy Empire Until the Decision of the General Council) was an imperial decree ordered on 15 May 1548 at the 1548 Diet of Augsburg (also having become known as the 'harnessed diet', due to its tense atmosphere, very close to outright hostility) by Charles V, Holy Roman Emperor, who had just defeated the forces of the Protestant Schmalkaldic League in the Schmalkaldic War of 1546/47. Although it ordered Protestants to readopt traditional Catholic beliefs and practices, including the seven Sacraments, it allowed for Protestant clergymen the right to marry and for the laity to receive communion in both kinds (bread and wine). It is considered the first significant step in the process leading to the political and religious legitimization of Protestantism as a valid alternative Christian creed to Roman Catholicism finally realized in the 1552 Peace of Passau and the 1555 Peace of Augsburg. The Interim became Imperial law on 30 June 1548. The Pope advised all bishops to abide by the concessions made to the Protestants in the Interim in August 1549.

== Schmalkaldic War and the Battle of Mühlberg ==
In June 1546, Pope Paul III entered into an agreement with Holy Roman Emperor Charles V to curb the spread of the Protestant Reformation. The agreement stated, in part:

In the name of God and with the help and assistance of his Papal Holiness, his Imperial Majesty should prepare himself for war, and equip himself with soldiers and everything pertaining to warfare against those who objected to the Council [of Trent], against the Smalcald League, and against all who were addicted to the false belief and error in Germany, and that he do so with all his power and might, in order to bring them back to the old faith and to the obedience of the Holy See.

Shortly thereafter, Maurice of Saxony invaded the lands of his rival and stepbrother John Frederick, beginning the brief, but devastating, conflict known as the Schmalkaldic War. The military might of Maurice combined with that of Charles V proved to be overwhelming to John Frederick and the Protestant Schmalkaldic League. On 24 April 1547, the armies of the Schmalkaldic League were decisively defeated at the Battle of Mühlberg.

Following the defeat of the Schmalkaldic League at Mühlberg, Charles V's forces took and occupied the Lutheran territories in quick succession. On 19 May 1547 Wittenberg, the heart of the Reformation and the final resting place of Martin Luther’s remains, fell to the Emperor without a fight.

== The Interim ==
Charles V had won a military victory but realized that his only chance he had to contain Lutheranism as a movement effectively was to pursue political and ecclesiastical compromises to restore religious peace in the Empire. The series of decrees issued by the Emperor became known as an “Interim” because they were intended to govern the church only temporarily pending the conclusions of the general council convened at Trent by Pope Paul III in December 1545.

The first draft of the twenty-six chapter decree was written by Julius von Pflug, but several theologians were involved in the final draft: on the Catholic side, Michael Helding, Eberhard Billick, Pedro Domenico Soto and Pedro de Malvenda; on the Protestant side, John Agricola.

Included in the provisions of the Interim was that the Lutherans restore the number of sacraments (which the Lutherans reduced to two: Baptism, the Lord's Supper) and that the churches restore a number of specifically Roman ceremonies, doctrines, and practices that had been discarded by the Lutheran reformers, including transubstantiation, and the rejection of the doctrine of justification by grace, through faith alone. The God-given authority of the Pope over all bishops and the whole Church was reaffirmed but with the proviso that "the powers that he has should be used not to destroy but to uplift".

In stark contrast to Charles V's past attitude, significant concessions were made to the Protestants. What was basically a new code of religious practices permitted both clerical marriage and communion under both kinds. The Mass was reintroduced, but the offertory was to be seen as an act of remembrance and thanks, rather than an act of propitiation as in traditional Catholic dogma. The Interim went further in making significant statements on other matters of dogma such as justification by faith, the veneration of the saints, and the authority of the Scriptures. Even such details as the practice of fasting was breached upon.

The attempt by the emperor to devise a formula to which both Catholics and Protestants of Germany could subscribe was objected to outright by the Catholic Electors, the prince-bishops and the Pope even before the decree was published. Charles had intentionally kept the text of the document from the Pope and his representatives, making it available to a papal nuncio less than an hour before it was read out to the Diet and subsequently published. The Pope, of course, would have preferred to be consulted first. Therefore, as a decree, the Interim applied only to the Protestant princes, who were given just 18 days to signify their compliance.

Although Philip Melanchthon, a friend of Luther's and co-architect and voice of the Reformation movement, was willing to compromise on those issues for the sake of peace, the Augsburg Interim was rejected by a significant number of Lutheran pastors and theologians.

Pastors who refused to follow the regulations of the Augsburg Interim were removed from office and banished; some were imprisoned and some were even executed. In Swabia and along the Rhine River, some four hundred pastors went to prison, rather than agree to the Interim. They were exiled, and some of their families were killed or died as a result. Some preachers left for England (McCain et al., 476).

As a result of the Interim, many Protestant leaders, such as Martin Bucer, fled to England, where they would influence the English Reformation.

Charles V tried to enforce the Interim in the Holy Roman Empire but was successful only in territories under his military control, such as Württemberg and certain imperial cities in southern Germany. There was a great deal of political opposition to the Interim. Many Catholic princes did not accept the Interim since they were worried about rising imperial authority. The papacy refused to recognize the Interim for over a year, as it was seen as an infringement upon papal jurisdiction.

== Leipzig Interim ==
In a further effort to compromise, Melanchthon strived for a second "Interim". Maurice of Saxony, who had been Charles's ally in the previous conflict, worked with Melanchthon and his supporters a compromise known as the Leipzig Interim in late 1548. Despite its even greater concessions to Protestantism, it was barely enforced.

Protestant leaders rejected the terms of the Augsburg Interim. The Leipzig Interim was designed to allow Lutherans to retain their core theological beliefs, specifically where the doctrine of justification by grace was concerned, but to make them yield in other less important matters, such as church rituals. This compromise document again drew opposition. Those who supported the Leipzig Interim became identified as Philippists, as they supported Melanchthon's efforts at compromise. Those who opposed Melanchthon became known as "Gnesio-Lutherans", or "genuine" Lutherans.

Maurice, seeing that the Leipzig Interim was a political failure, began making plans to drive Charles V and his army from Saxony. It was, in his estimation, "more expedient for him [Maurice] to be viewed as a champion of Lutheranism than as a traitor" (McCain et al., 480). On 5 April 1552, Maurice attacked Charles V's forces at Augsburg, and Charles was forced to withdraw. This victory eventually resulted in the signing of the treaties of Passau (2 August 1552) and Augsburg (1555). These two treaties resulted in the principle "Cuius regio, eius religio" – He who rules, his the religion – allowing the ruler of a territory to set the religion therein.

== Sources ==
- Acton, John Emerich Edward Dalberg; Benians, Ernest Alfred; Ward, Sir Adolphus William; Prothero, George Walter (1904). The Cambridge Modern History. New York: Macmillan & Co., ltd.
- Bente, Friedrich (2005). Historical Introductions to the Lutheran Confessions. Concordia Publishing House.
- Kagan, Donald; Steven Ozment; Frank M. Turner (2002). The Western Heritage: Since 1300 (Eighth ed.). New York: Prentice Hall publishing. ISBN 0-13-182883-5.
- Lindsay, Thomas M. (1906). A History of the Reformation. New York: Charles Scribner's Sons.
- McCain, Paul Timothy; Robert Cleveland Baker; Gene Edward Veith; Edward Andrew Engelbrecht (2005). Concordia: The Lutheran Confessions. A Reader's Edition of the Book of Concord. Concordia Publishing House.
- Smith, Henry Preserved (1920). The Age of the Reformation. New York: Henry Holt and Company.
