= Melanchthonhaus =

Melanchthonhaus may refer to:

- Melanchthonhaus (Bretten), a museum and research facility of the Protestant Reformation in Bretten
- Melanchthonhaus (Wittenberg), a writer's house museum in Lutherstadt Wittenberg
