= Hermann Billing =

German architect

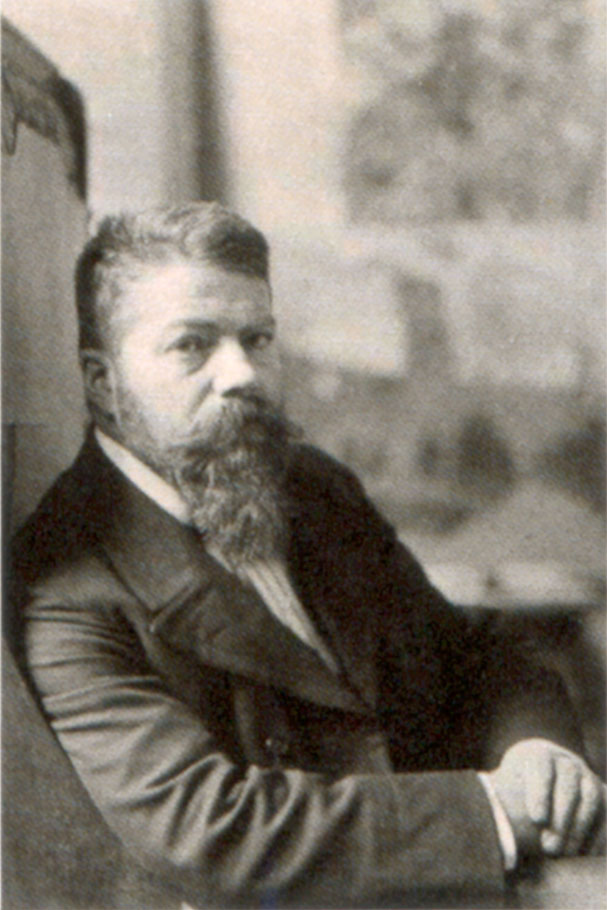
Hermann Billing in 1909

Hermann Billing (February 7, 1867, Karlsruhe – March 2, 1946, Karlsruhe) was a German Art Nouveau architect and designer.

He attended high school, Kunstgewerbeschule and architectural college, but completed none of them. Funded by his wealthy first wife, he started his work by taking part in competitions. He gained reputation for his avantgarde ideas and subsequently contracts for public buildings. After 1920, he was professor at the Academy of Fine Arts, Karlsruhe and the University of Technology.

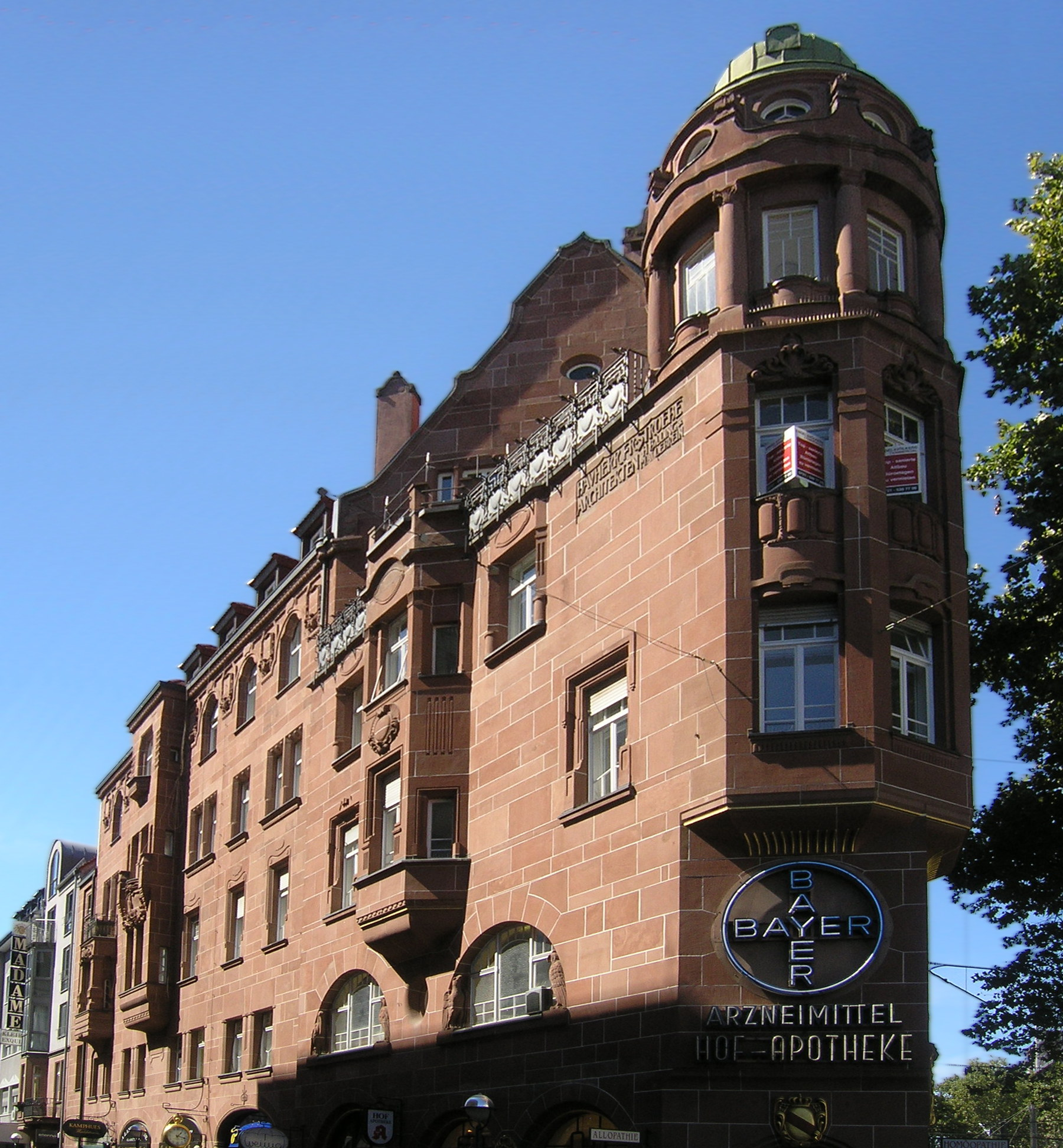
Court pharmacy building in Karlsruhe, 1901

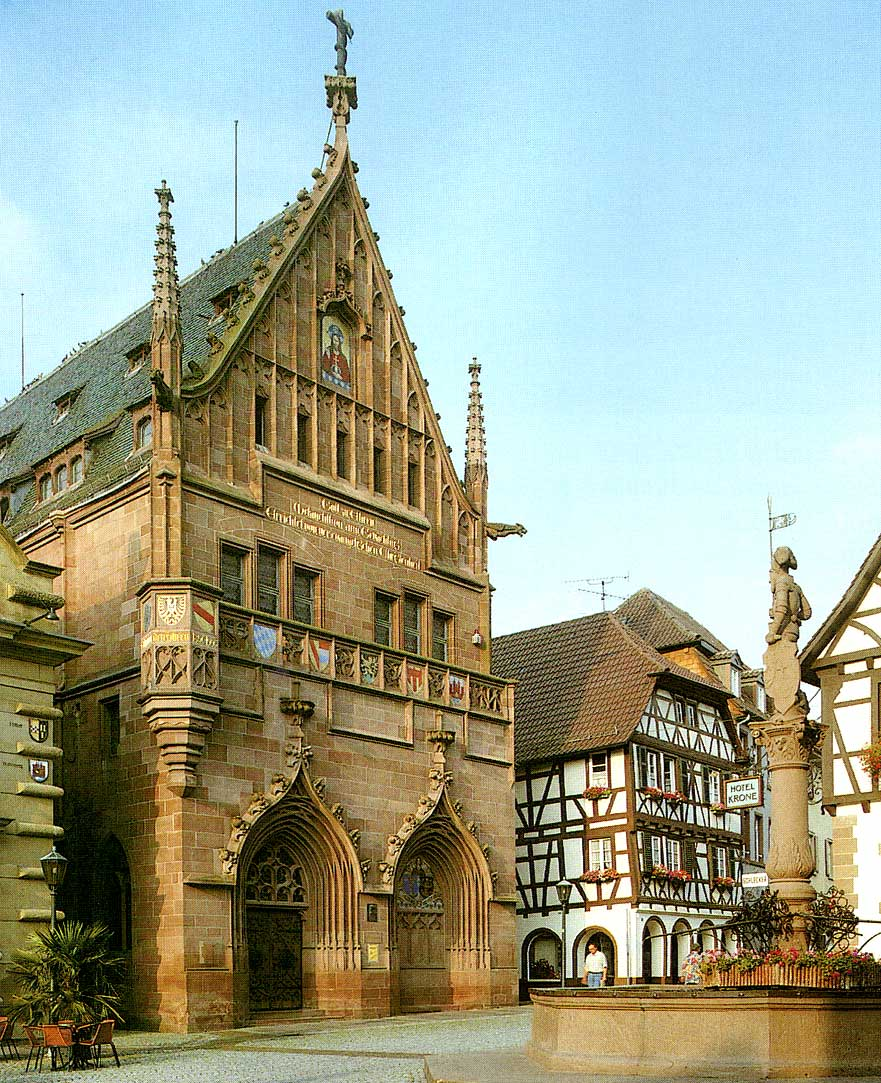
Melanchthonhaus (Bretten), 1903

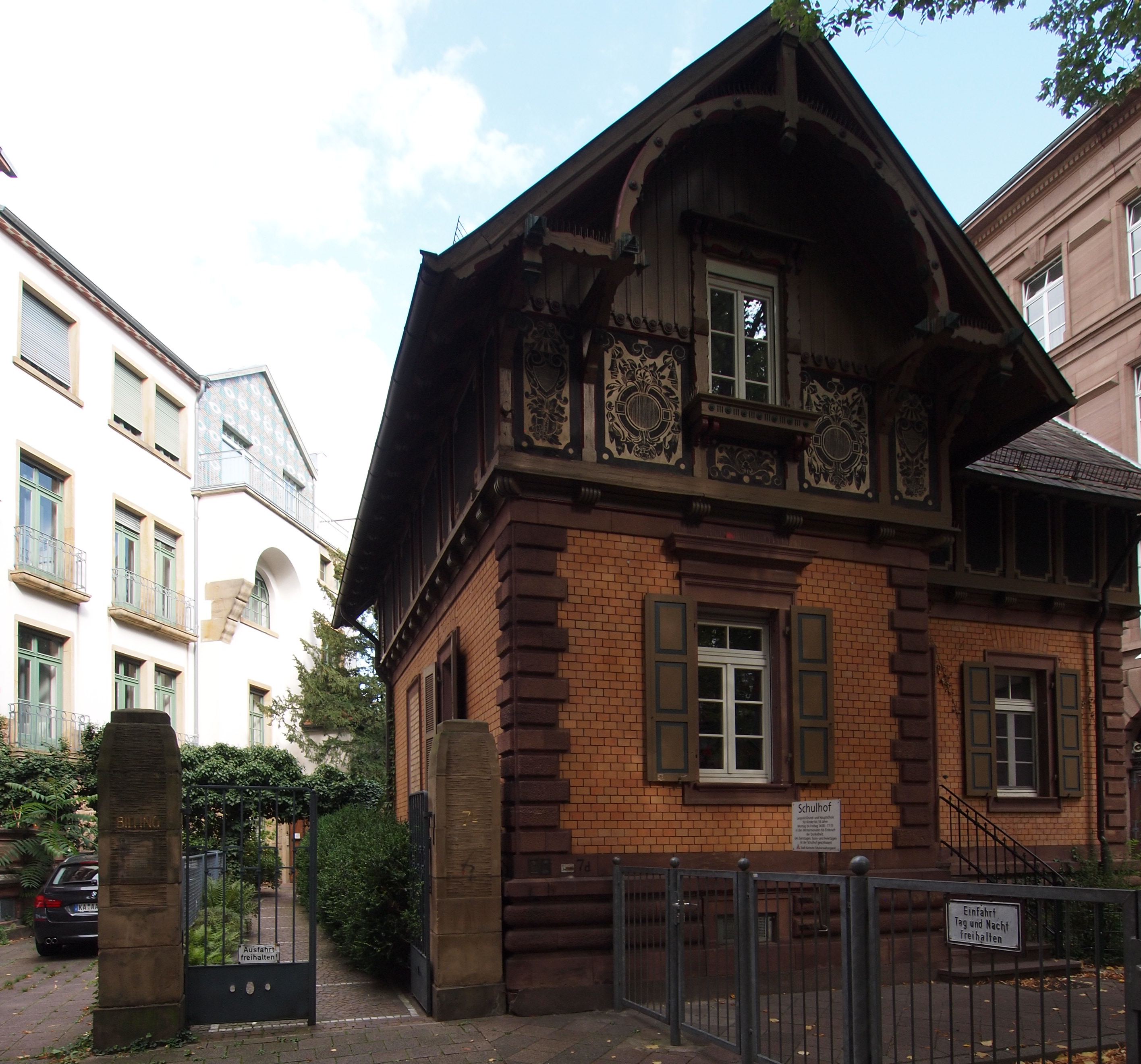
his own house in Karlsruhe, 1905

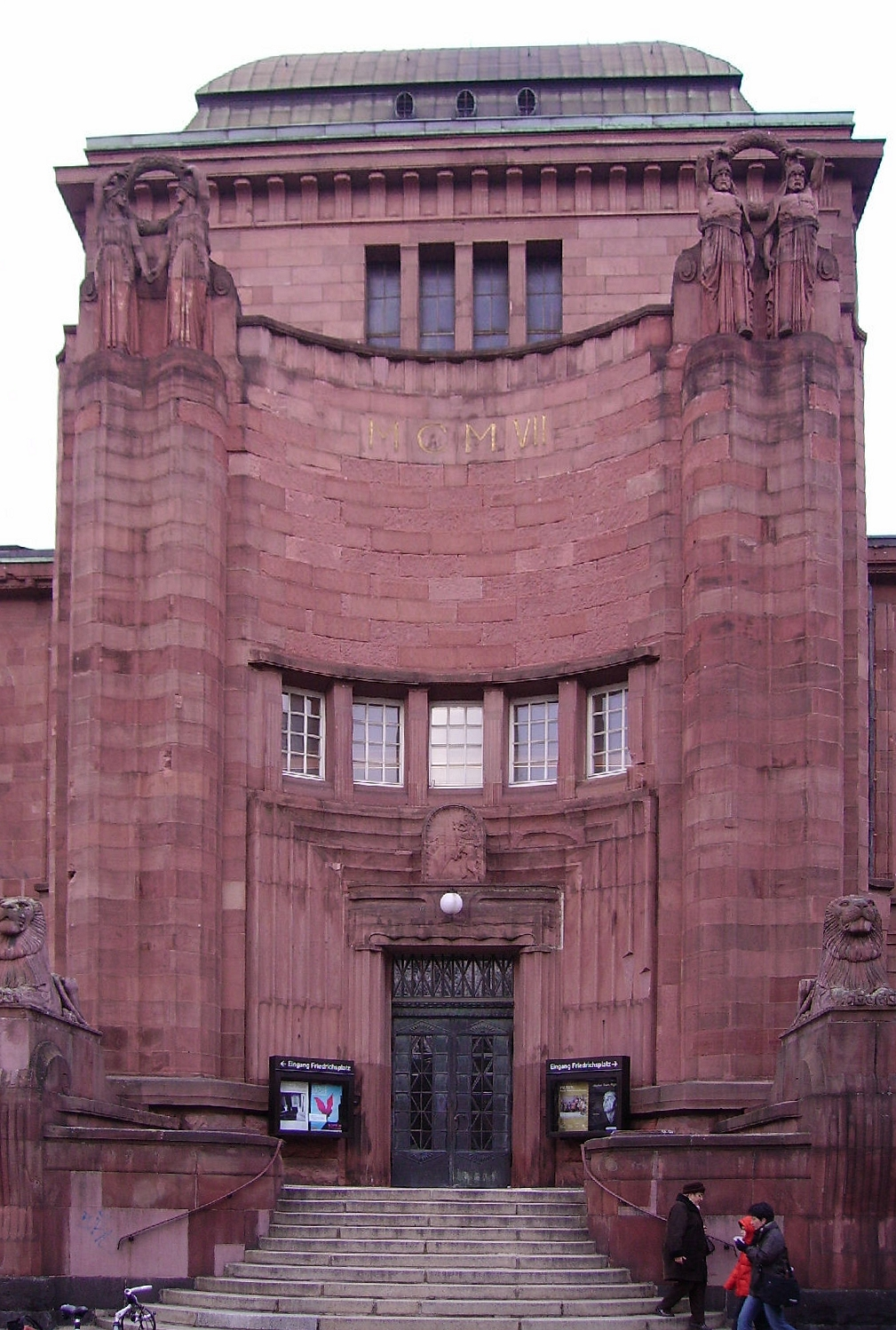
Kunsthalle Mannheim, 1907

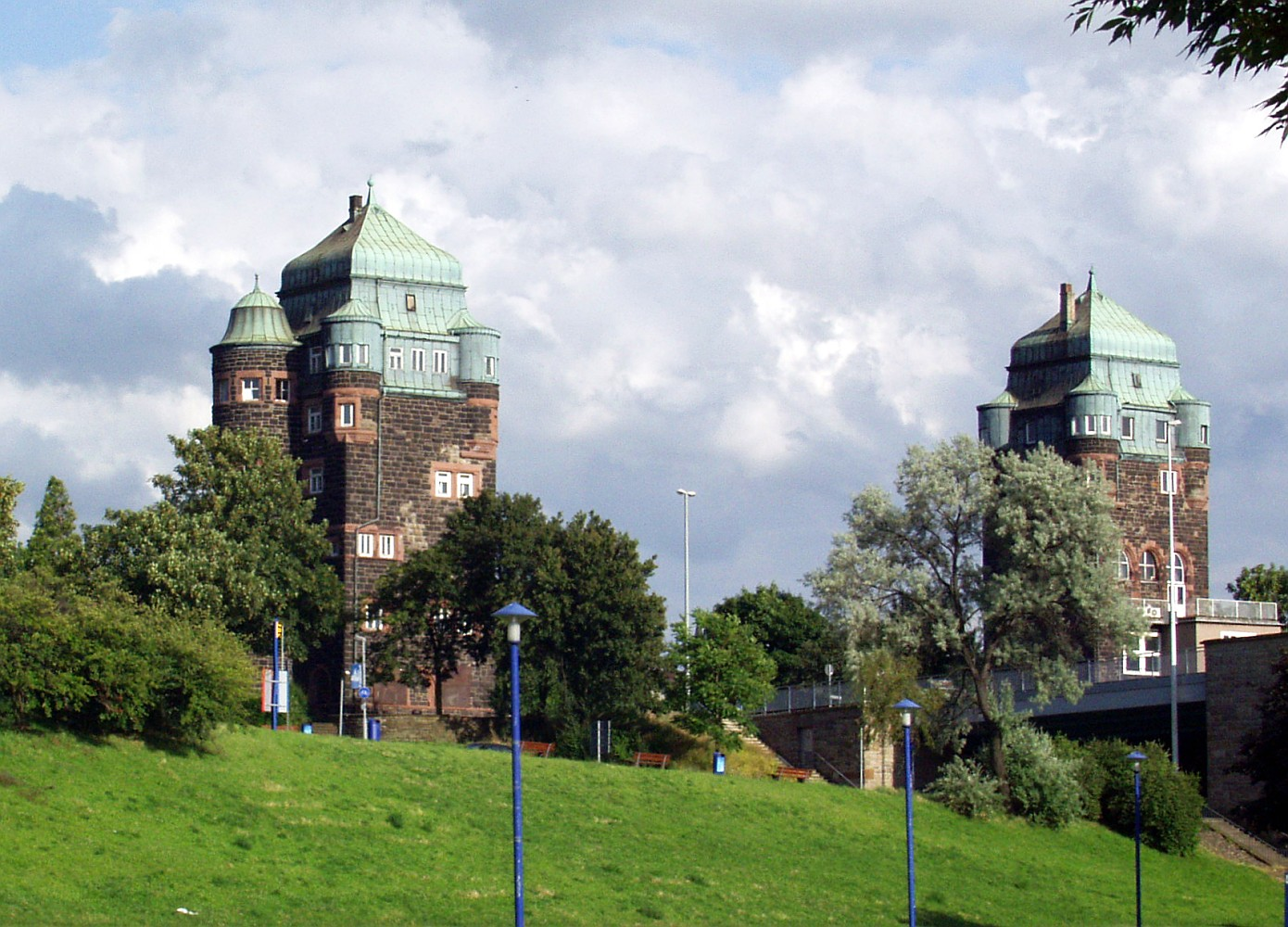
Bridge towers in Duisburg, 1907

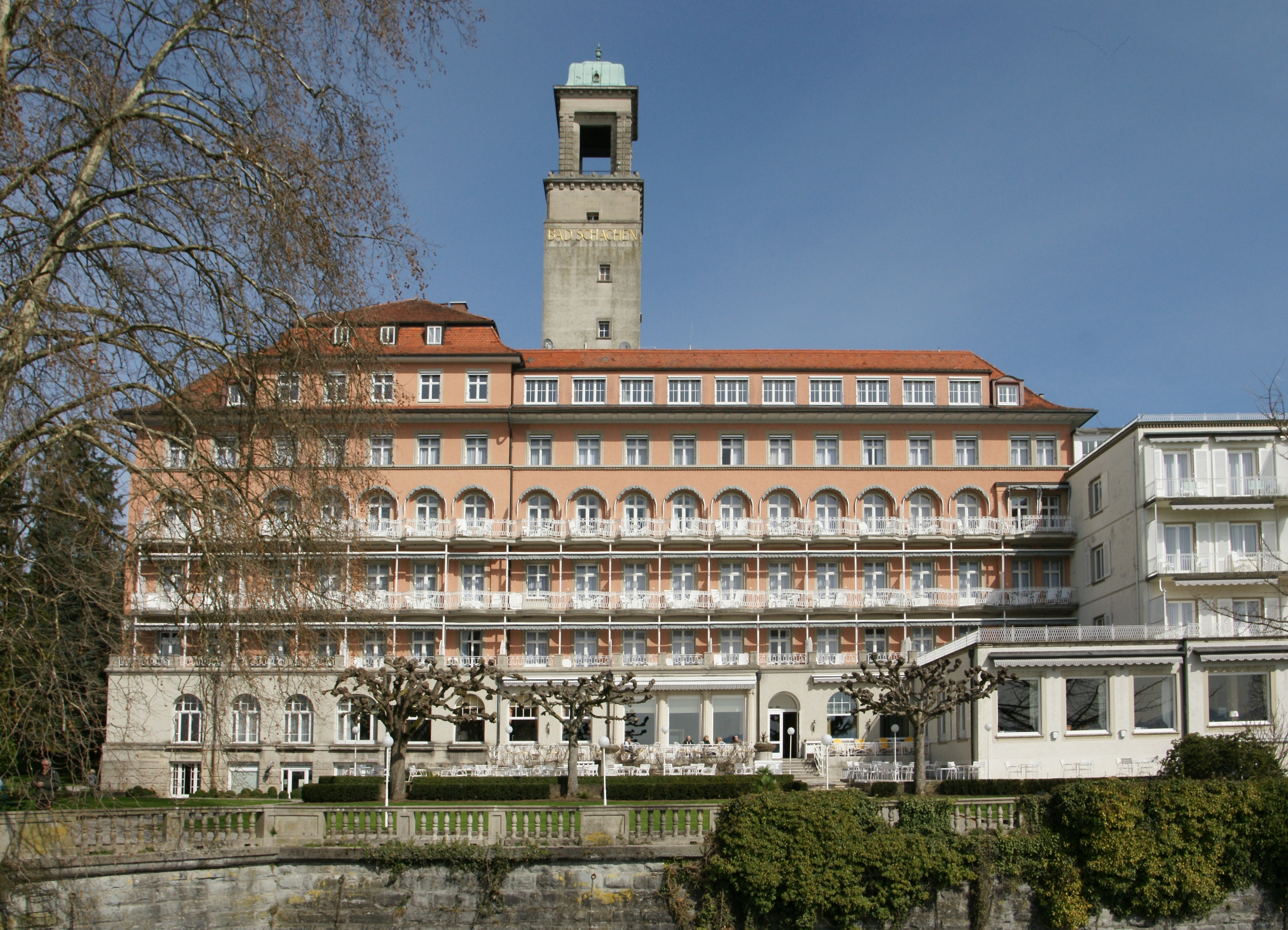
Hotel Bad Schachen in Lindau, 1910

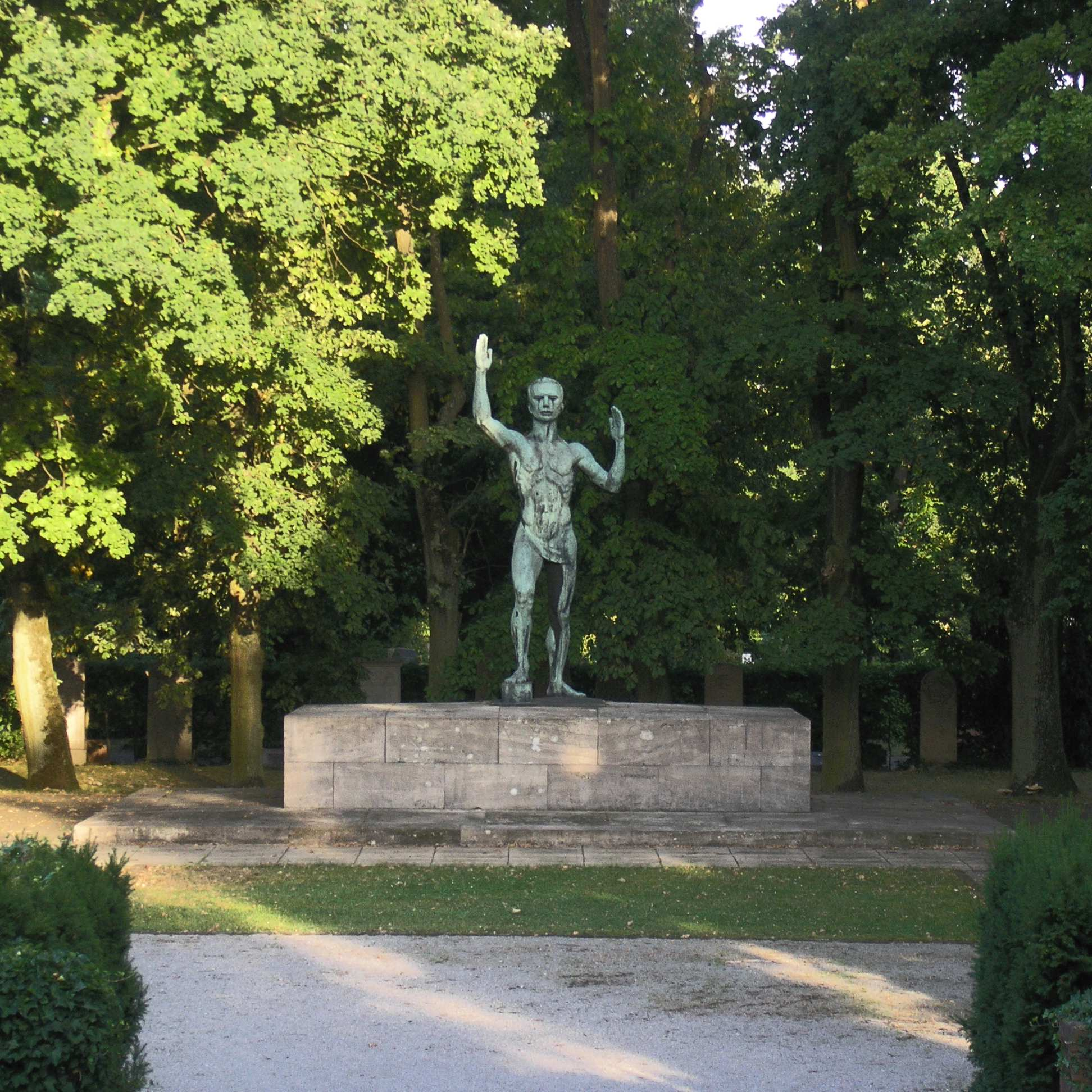
War memorial, 1930

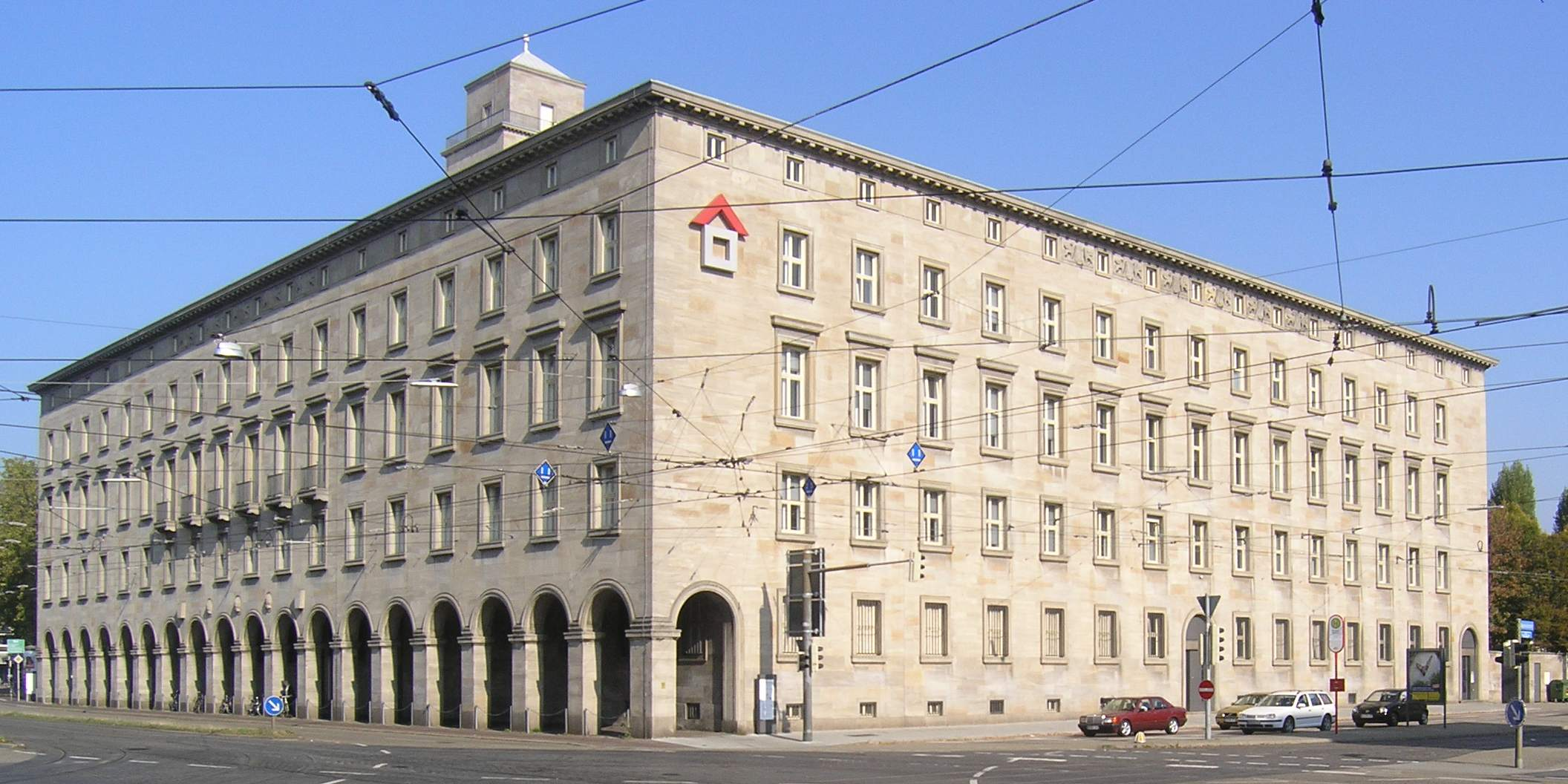
Postal administration in Karlsruhe, 1938
Baischstraße in Karlsruhe, a neighbourhood planned completely by Hermann Billing, 1900-1903

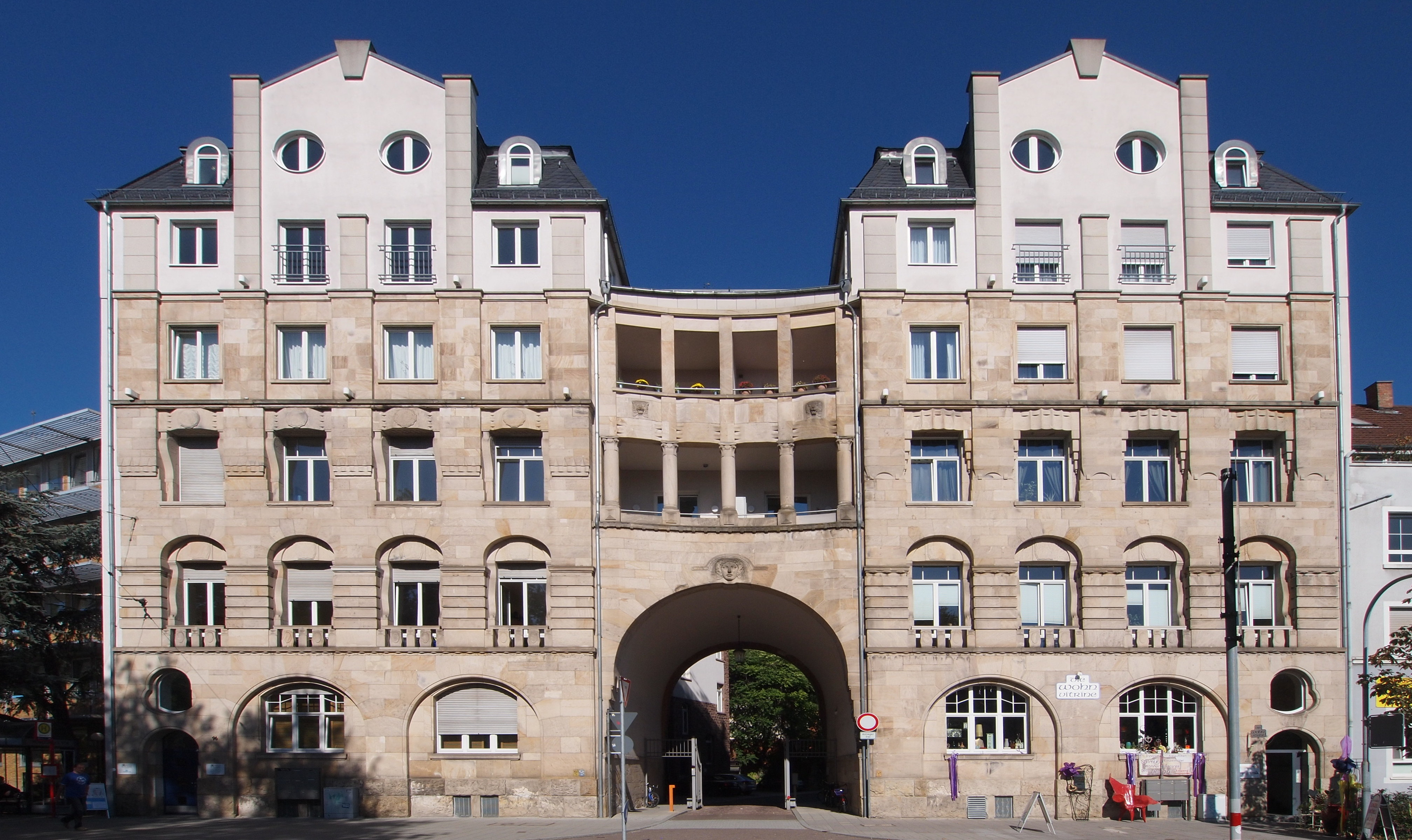
gate house (altered)

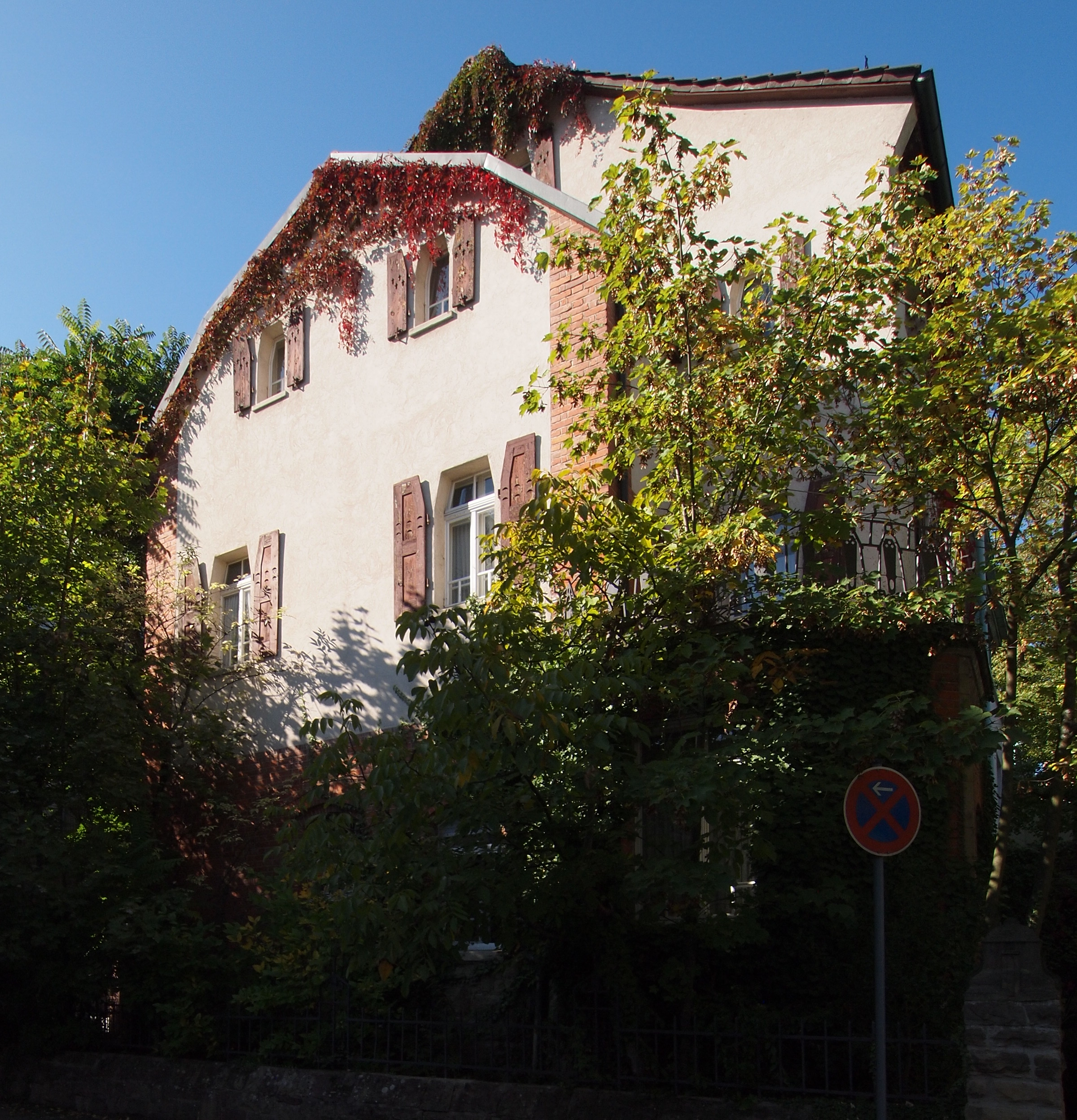
Nr. 1

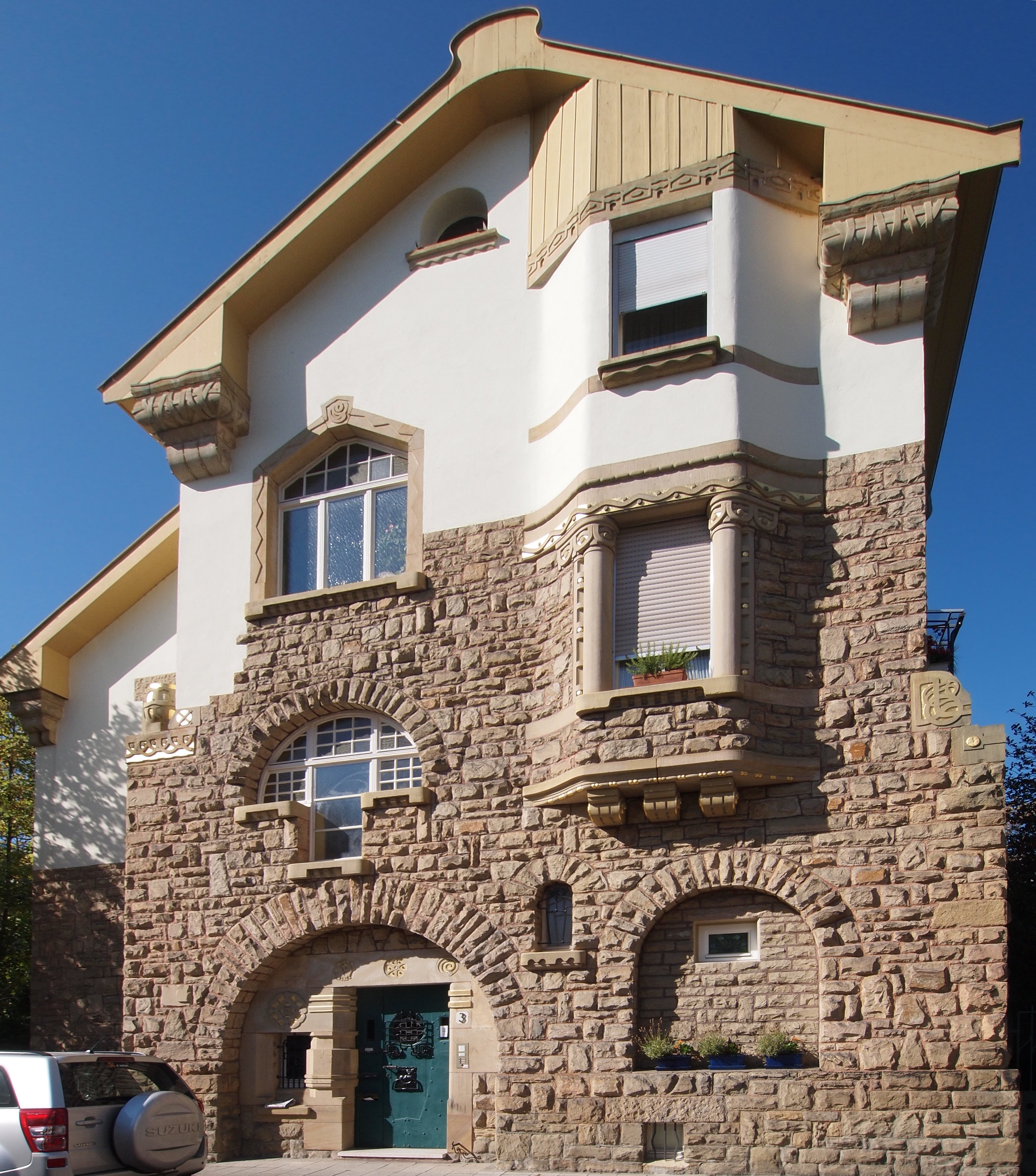
Nr. 3

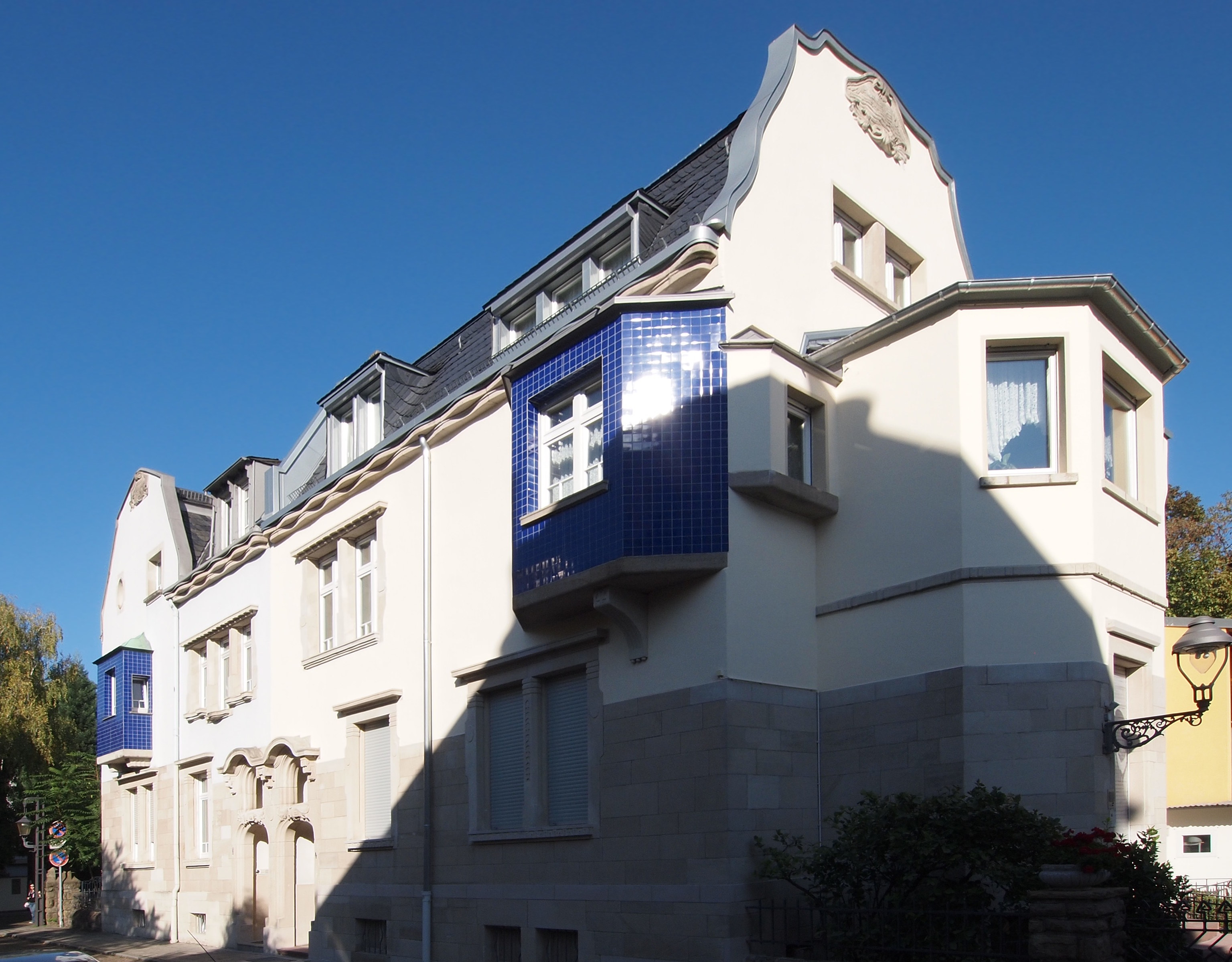
Nr. 4–6

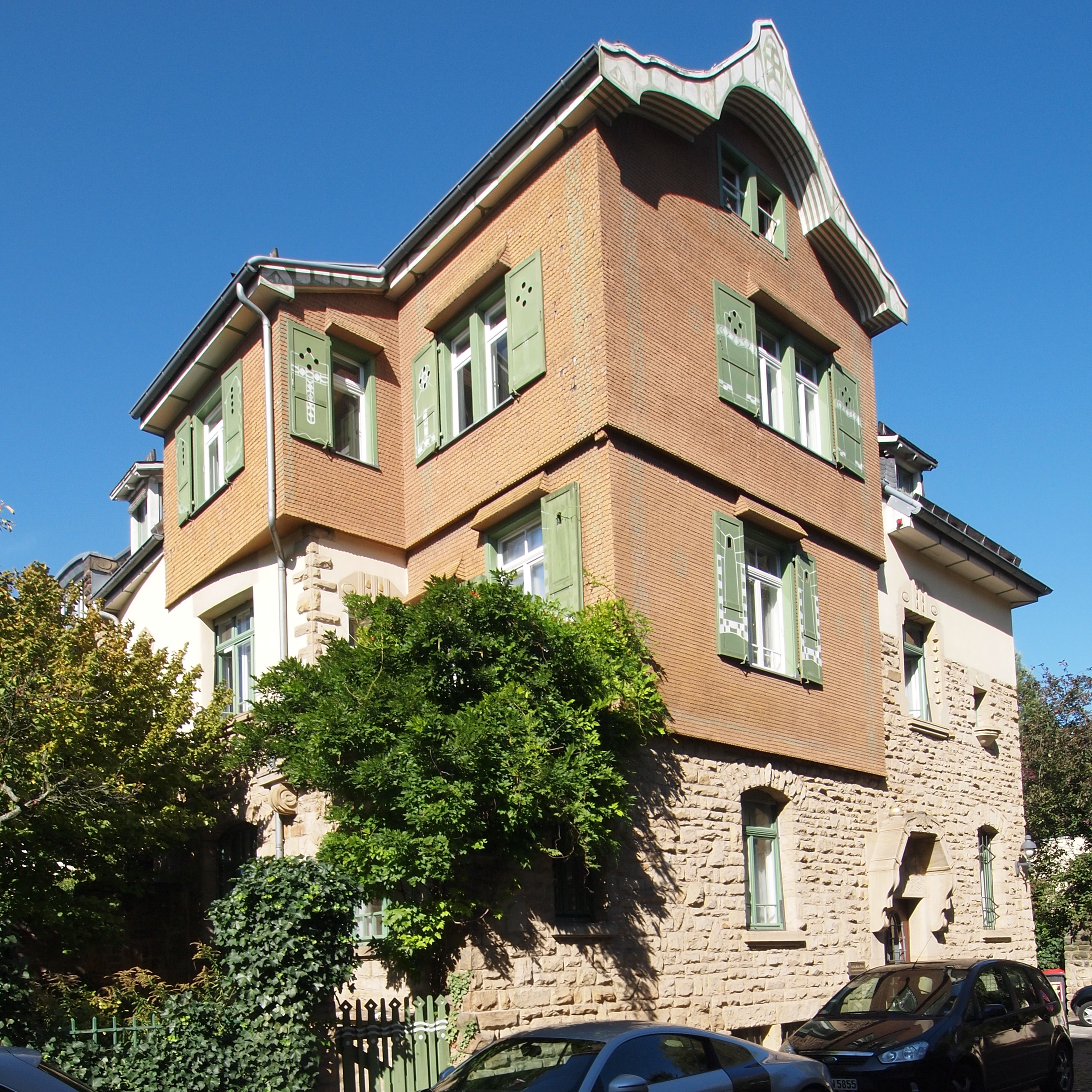
Nr. 5
