= Katharina Krapp =

Wife of Philipp Melanchthon

- Born: 1497
- Died: 11 October 1557
- Spouse: Philipp Melanchthon

Katharina Krapp, also known as Katharina Melanchthon, (October 1497–11 October 1557 in Wittenberg), was a German woman, daughter of the tailor and mayor of Wittenberg, Hans Krapp.

An independent and free woman, she later married Philip Melanchthon and was involved in managing their family and educating their children.

== Biography ==
Katharina Krapp was the daughter of the mayor of Wittenberg, Hans Krapp. She married Philip Melanchthon on 25 November 1520, and, surprisingly for the time, they were the same age. The marriage was actually pushed by Luther, their protector, who declared as early as August that God "intervened for the good of the Gospel, so that he may live longer under the protection of a woman". She seemed to be an independent and free woman because, shortly after their marriage, Melanchthon wrote to his friend Martin Luther, in Greek, that he was "no longer the master in his own house". He complained to another friend in these early years of marriage, declaring to Johann Lange, in a mix of Greek and Latin:

Katharina Krapp is given to me as a wife. I do not say that she was unexpected or that she was cold, but she possesses the manners and character that I should have wished from the immortal gods. [...] But I followed the advice of my friends, who encouraged me to marry because of the danger of the weakness of the flesh and the malignity of carnal liberty.

Unfortunately, for our understanding of Katharina Krapp, there are no preserved letters between her and her husband, although correspondence between them likely existed. Moreover, apart from a letter written in her name to the chancellor of Brandenburg, there are no primary sources about her except for testimonies from her husband to others. Initially, the couple were quite unhappy but gradually grew to love each other over the years. Katharina bore the couple's four children.

She died on 11 October 1557, in Wittenberg. Shortly after her death, Melanchthon wrote tenderly about her, suggesting that the two managed to reconcile over time: "The desire for the lost spouse does not fade in the elderly as it does in the young, who are always capable of new amorous impulses".
