= Philipp Melanchthon =

German Lutheran reformer and theologian (1497–1560)

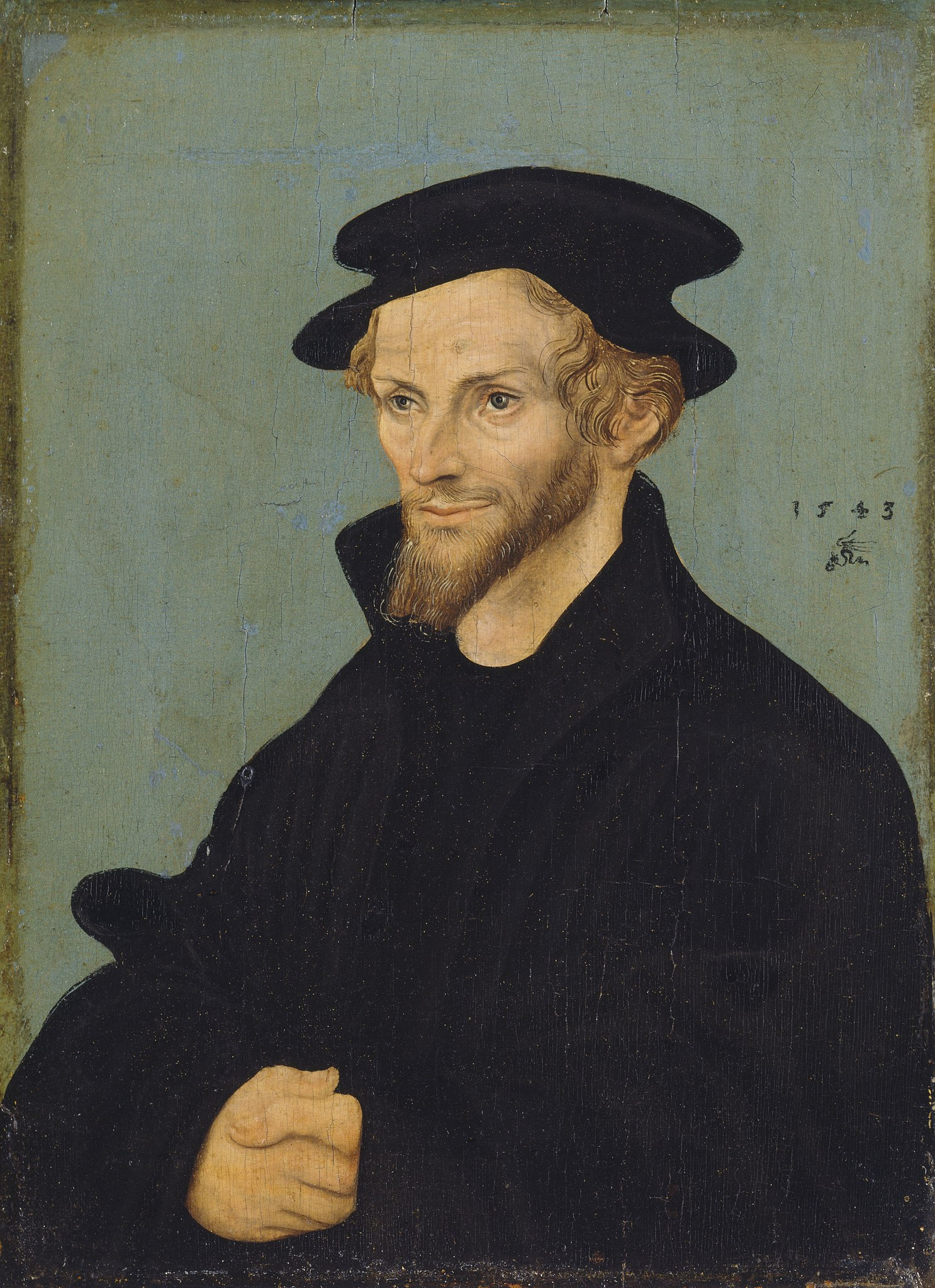
- Portrait by Lucas Cranach the Elder, 1543
- Born: Philipp Schwartzerdt; 16 February 1497; Bretten, Electoral Palatinate, Holy Roman Empire
- Died: 19 April 1560 (aged 63); Wittenberg, Electoral Saxony, Holy Roman Empire
- Education: University of Heidelberg; University of Tübingen
- Theological work
- Era: Reformation
- Language: German
- Tradition or movement: Lutheranism

Philipp Melanchthon (Note: /məˈlæŋkθən/ mə-LANK-thən; German: [ˈfɪlɪp meˈlançtɔn]; Latin: Philippus Melanchthon.) (born Philipp Schwartzerdt; (Note: German: [ˈʃvaʁtsʔeːɐ̯t].) 16 February 1497 – 19 April 1560) was a German Lutheran reformer, collaborator with Martin Luther, the first systematic theologian of the Protestant Reformation, an intellectual leader of the Lutheran Reformation, and influential designer of educational systems. Along with Luther and John Calvin, he played a major role in shaping Protestantism.

== Early life and education ==
He was born Philipp Schwartzerdt on 16 February 1497 at Bretten, where his father Georg Schwarzerdt (1459–1508) was armorer to Philip, Count Palatine of the Rhine. His mother was Barbara Reuter (1476/77-1529). Bretten was burned in 1689 by French troops during the War of the Palatinate Succession. The town's Melanchthonhaus was built on the site of his place of birth in 1897.

In 1507 he was sent to the Latin school at Pforzheim, where the rector, Georg Simler of Wimpfen, introduced him to the Latin and Greek poets and to Aristotle. He was influenced by his great-uncle Johann Reuchlin, a Renaissance humanist, who suggested Philipp follow a custom common among humanists of the time and change his surname from "Schwartzerdt" (literally 'black earth'), into the Greek equivalent "Melanchthon" (Μελάγχθων).

Philipp was 11 years old in 1508 when both his grandfather (d. 17 October) and father (d. 27 October) died within eleven days of each other. He and a brother were brought to Pforzheim to live with his maternal grandmother, Elizabeth Reuter, sister of Reuchlin.

The next year he entered the University of Heidelberg, where he studied philosophy, rhetoric, astronomy, and astrology, and became known as a scholar of Greek thought. In 1509, Melanchthon received his B.A. at the University of Heidelberg, and in 1512, his M.A. at Tübingen, where he would teach after obtaining his degrees. In 1518, he was called to Wittenberg at the request of his uncle to teach Greek. While there, he was also taught the technical aspects of astrology by Johannes Stöffler.

After gaining a master's degree in 1512, he began to study theology at Tübingen. Under the influence of Reuchlin, Erasmus, and others, he became convinced that true Christianity was something different from the scholastic theology taught at the university. In 1519, he received a B.D. and quickly began collaborating with Martin Luther on a translation of the Bible.

His first publications included a number of poems in a collection edited by Jakob Wimpfeling (c. 1511), the preface to Reuchlin's Epistolae clarorum virorum (1514), an edition of Terence (1516), and a book of Greek grammar (1518).

== Professor at Wittenberg ==
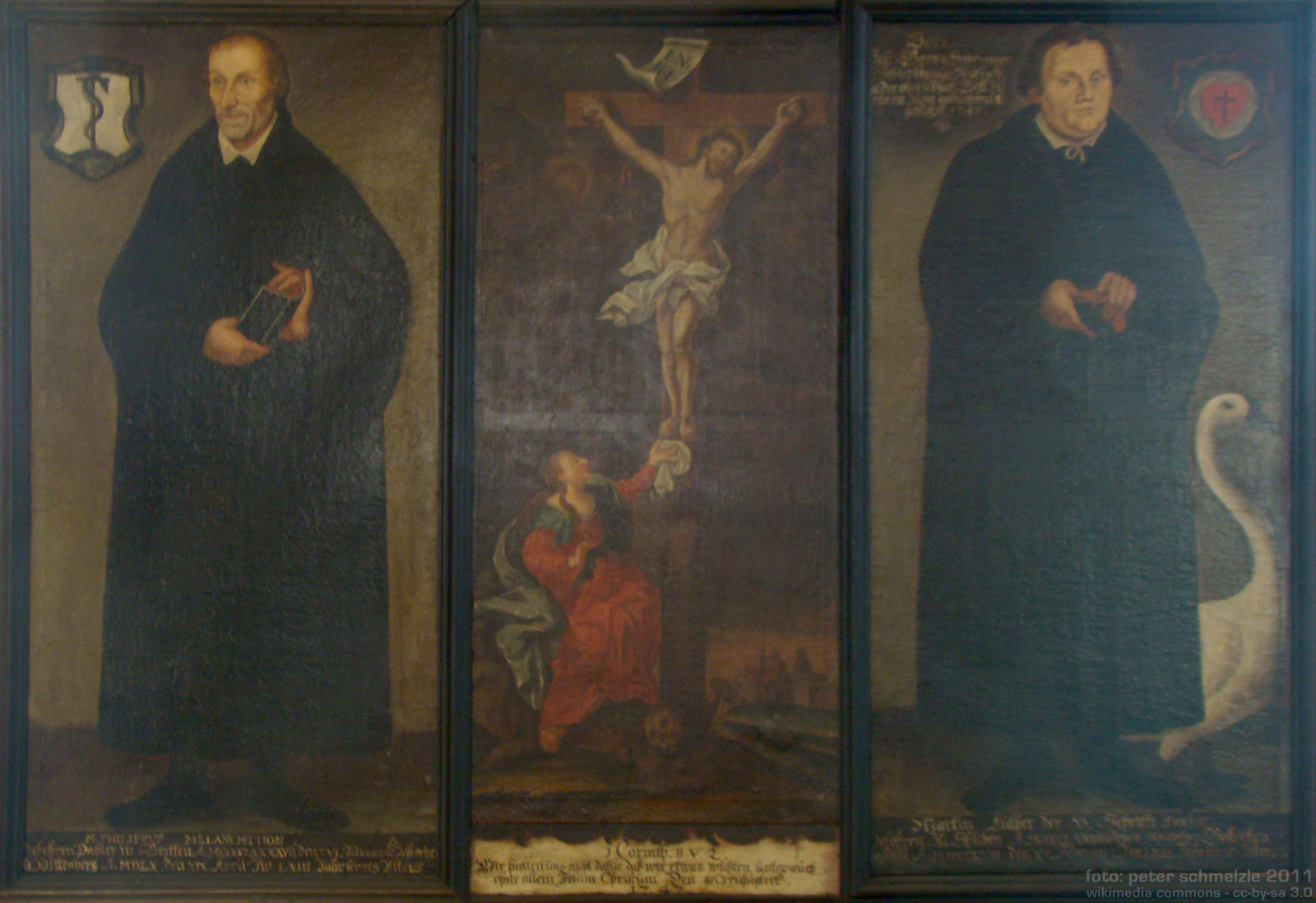
Melanchthon and Luther with Christ crucified in the middle

Already recognized as a reformer, he was opposed at Tübingen. He accepted a call to the University of Wittenberg from Martin Luther on the recommendation of his great-uncle, and became professor of Greek there in 1518 at the age of 21. He studied the Scriptures, especially of Paul, and evangelical doctrine. He attended the disputation of Leipzig (1519) as a spectator, but participated with his own comments. After his views were attacked by Johann Eck, he replied based on the authority of Scripture in his Defensio contra Johannem Eckium (Wittenberg, 1519).

Following lectures on the Gospel of Matthew and the Epistle to the Romans, together with his investigations into Pauline doctrine, he was granted the degree of bachelor of theology, and transferred to the theological faculty. He married Katharina Krapp (Katharina Melanchthon), (1497–1557) daughter of Wittenberg's mayor, on 25 November 1520. They had four children: Anna, Philipp, Georg, and Magdalen.

== Theological disputes ==
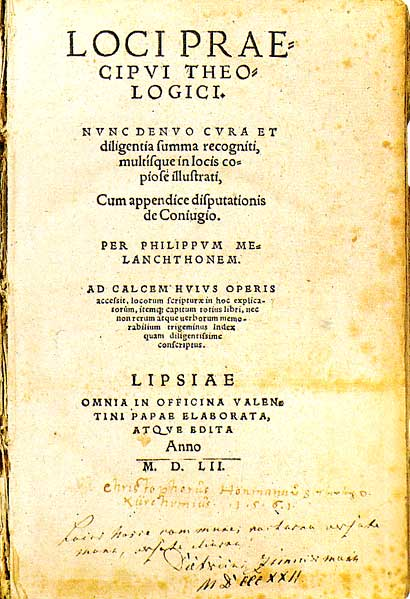
Loci Communes, 1552 edition

In the beginning of 1521, Melanchthon defended Luther in his Didymi Faventini versus Thomam Placentinum pro M. Luthero oratio (Wittenberg, n.d.). He argued that Luther rejected only papal and ecclesiastical practises which were at variance with Scripture. But while Luther was absent at Wartburg Castle, during the disturbances caused by the Zwickau prophets, Melanchthon wavered.

The appearance of Melanchthon's Loci communes rerum theologicarum seu hypotyposes theologicae (Wittenberg and Basel, 1521) was of subsequent importance to the Reformation. Melanchthon discussed the "leading thoughts" of Paul's Letter to the Romans and used this platform to present a new doctrine of Christianity; one where faith in God was more important than good deeds. Loci communes contributed to the gradual rise of the Lutheran scholastic tradition, and the later theologians Martin Chemnitz, (Note: For an example of this from Chemnitz, see Chemnitz 2004, which is excerpted from his Loci Theologici.) Mathias Haffenreffer, and Leonhard Hutter expanded upon it. Melanchthon continued to lecture on the classics.

On a journey in 1524 to his native town, he encountered the papal legate, Cardinal Lorenzo Campeggio, who tried to draw him from Luther's cause. In his Unterricht der Visitatorn an die Pfarherrn im Kurfürstentum zu Sachssen (1528) Melanchthon presented the evangelical doctrine of salvation as well as regulations for churches and schools.

In 1529, Melanchthon accompanied the elector to the Diet of Speyer. His hopes of persuading the Holy Roman Empire to recognize the Reformation were not fulfilled. A friendly attitude towards the Swiss at the Diet was something he later changed, calling Huldrych Zwingli's doctrine of the Lord's Supper "an impious dogma".

== Augsburg Confession ==
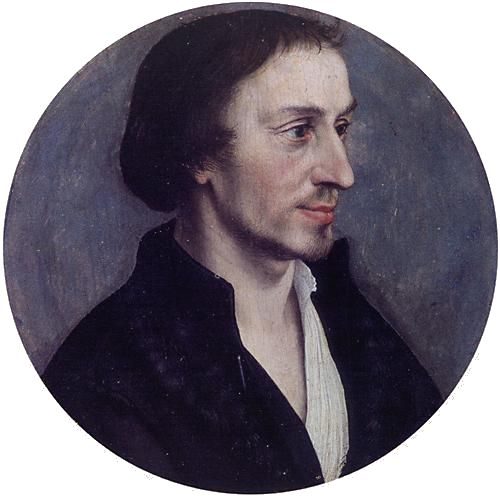
Portrait by Hans Holbein the Younger, c. 1530-1535

The composition now known as the Augsburg Confession was presented at the Diet of Augsburg in 1530, and would come to be considered perhaps the most significant document of the Protestant Reformation.

While the confession was based on Luther's Marburg and Schwabach articles, it was mainly the work of Melanchthon; although it was commonly thought of as a unified statement of doctrine by the two reformers, Luther did not conceal his dissatisfaction with its irenic tone. Indeed, some would criticize Melanchthon's conduct at the Diet as unbecoming of the principle he promoted, implying that faith in the truth of his cause should logically have inspired Melanchthon to a firmer and more dignified posture. Others point out that he had not sought the part of a political leader, suggesting that he seemed to lack the requisite energy and decision for such a role and may simply have been a lackluster judge of human nature.

Melanchthon represented Luther at the conference, as Luther was barred from attending. Charles V had called the Diet of Augsburg in order to unite religious groups in the face of a potential war with the Ottoman Empire. However, despite all efforts and attempts at compromise, there was no reconciliation between Catholics and Lutherans.

After the confession was discussed and official response, the Pontifical Confutation of the Augsburg Confession was produced. Melanchthon wrote a reply to this which became known as the Apology of the Augsburg Confession.

Melanchthon then settled into the comparative quiet of his academic and literary labours. His most important theological work of this period was the Commentarii in Epistolam Pauli ad Romanos (Wittenberg, 1532), noteworthy for introducing the idea that "to be justified" means "to be accounted just", whereas the Apology had placed side by side the meanings of "to be made just" and "to be accounted just". Melanchthon's increasing fame gave occasion for prestigious invitations to Tübingen (September 1534), France, and England but consideration of the elector caused him to refuse them.

In 1540, he produced a revised edition, the Variata, which was signed by John Calvin. The main difference is in the treatment of the real presence in the Lord's Supper. Many Lutheran churches specify that they subscribe to the "Unaltered Augsburg Confession", as opposed to the Variata.

== Controversies in the 1530s ==
Melanchthon played an important role in discussions concerning the Lord's Supper which began in 1531. He approved of Bucer's Wittenberg Concord and discussed the question with Bucer in Kassel in 1534. He worked for an agreement on this question, as his patristic studies and the Dialogue (1530) of Johannes Oecolampadius had made him doubt the correctness of Luther's doctrine.

Zwingli's death and the change of the political situation changed his earlier stance in regard to a union. Bucer did not go so far as to believe with Luther that the true body of Christ in the Lord's Supper is bitten by the teeth, but admitted the offering of the body and blood in the symbols of bread and wine. Melanchthon discussed Bucer's views with Luther's adherent, but Luther himself would not agree to a veiling of the dispute. Melanchthon's relationship with Luther was not changed by his mediation work, although for a time Luther suspected that Melanchthon was "almost of the opinion of Zwingli".

During his time in Tübingen in 1536 Melanchthon was heavily criticised by Cordatus, preacher in Niemeck, as he had taught that works are necessary for salvation. In the second edition of his Loci (1535), he abandoned his earlier strict doctrine of determinism and instead taught what he called Synergism. He repudiated Cordatus' criticism in a letter to Luther and his other colleagues, stating that he had never departed from their common teachings on this subject and in the Antinomian Controversy of 1537 Melanchthon was in harmony with Luther.

== Controversies in the 1540s ==
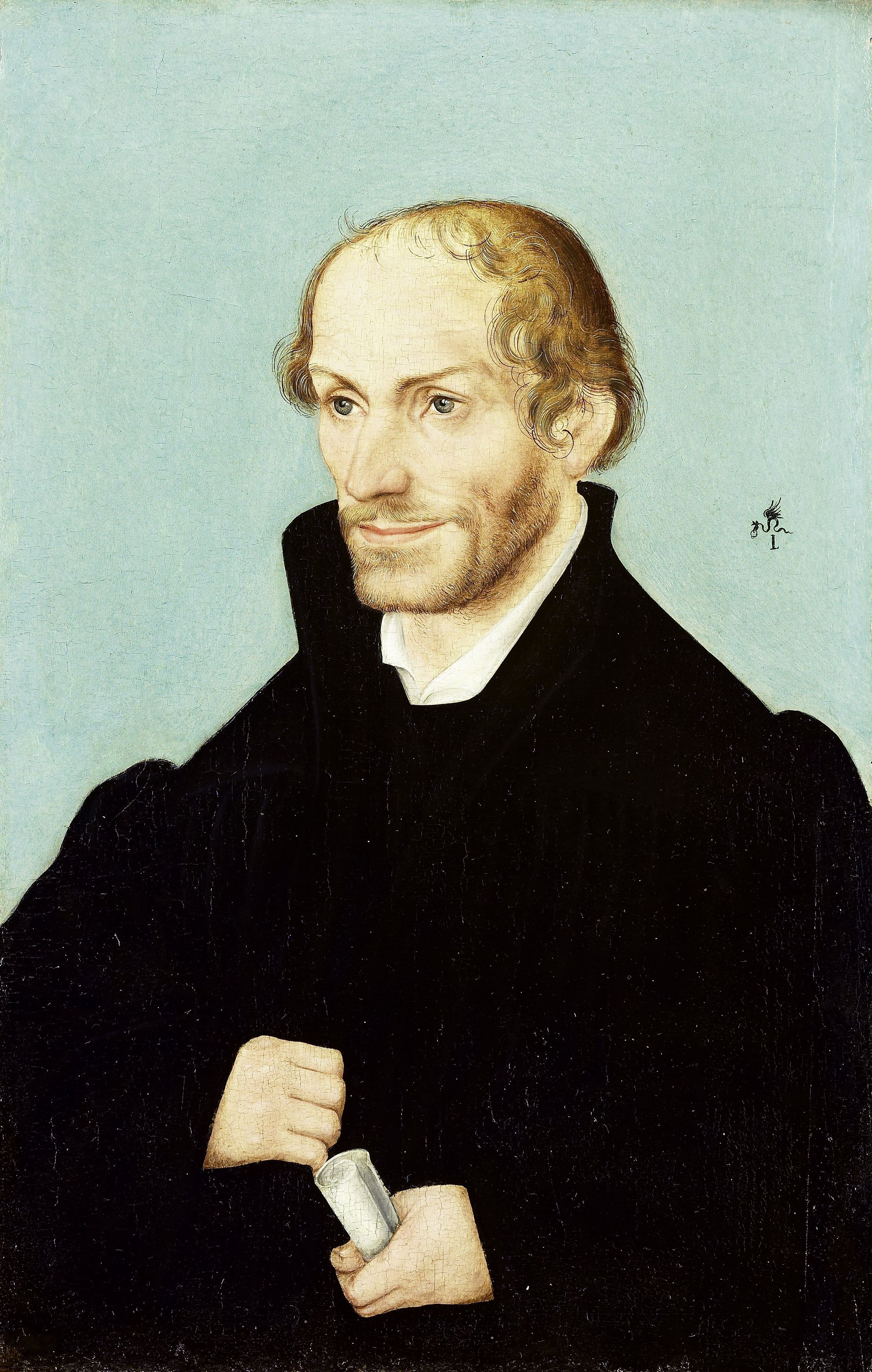
Portrait of Philipp Melanchthon, 1537, by Lucas Cranach the Elder

Melanchthon faced controversies over the Interims and the Adiaphora (1547). He rejected the Augsburg Interim, which the emperor wished to impose. During negotiations concerning the Leipzig Interim he made controversial concessions. In agreeing to various Catholic usages, Melanchthon held the opinion that they are adiaphora, if nothing is changed in the pure doctrine and the sacraments which Jesus instituted. However he disregarded the position that concessions made under such circumstances have to be regarded as a denial of Evangelical convictions.

Melanchthon later regretted his actions.

After Luther's death he became seen by many as the "theological leader of the German Reformation" although the Gnesio-Lutherans led by Matthias Flacius accused him and his followers of heresy and apostasy. Melanchthon bore the accusations with patience, dignity, and self-control.

In his controversy on justification with Andreas Osiander Melanchthon satisfied all parties. He took part also in a controversy with Stancaro, who held that Christ was our justification only according to his human nature.

== Controversies in the 1550s ==
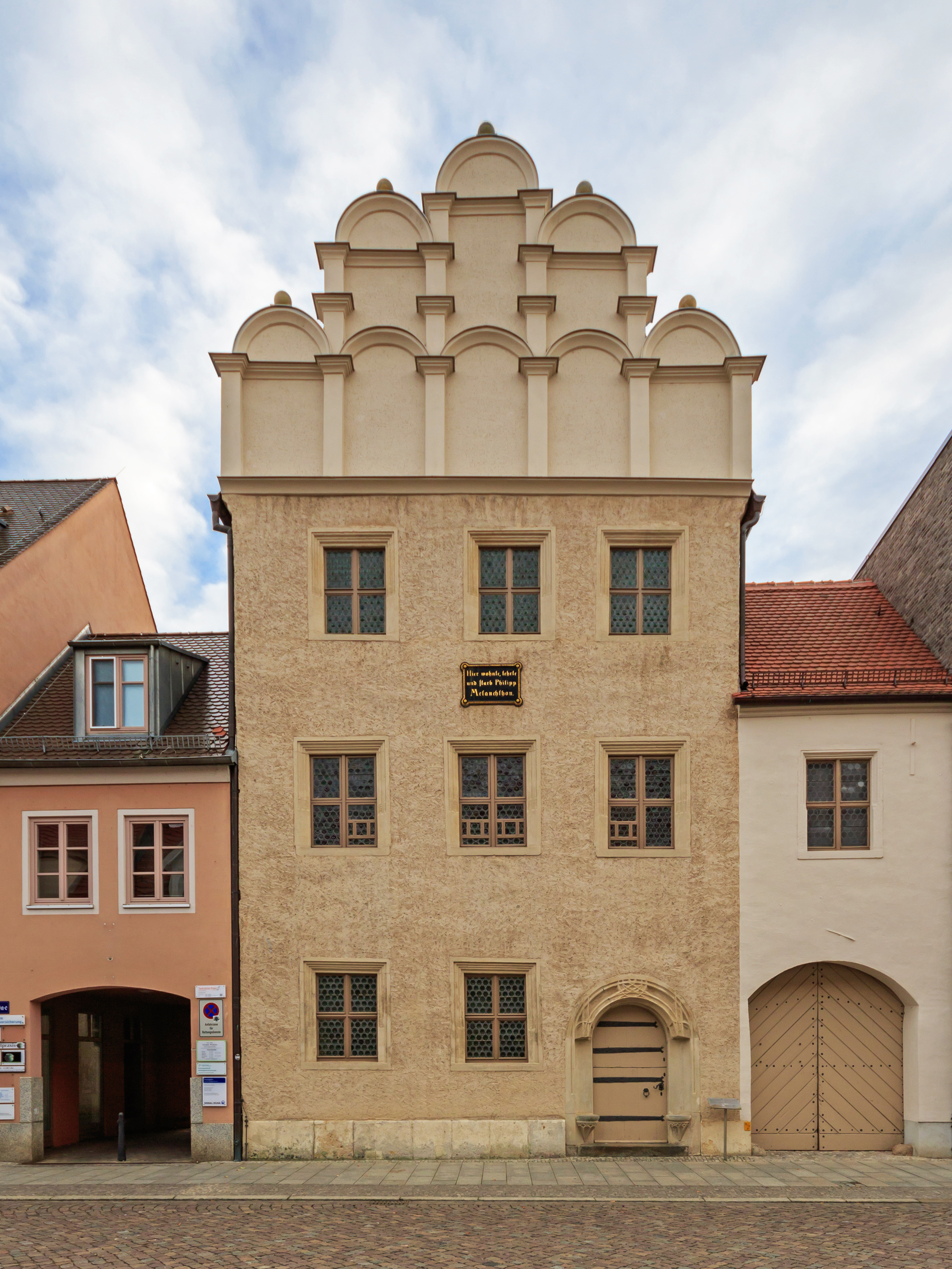
Melanchthon's house in Wittenberg

In 1552 the Elector of Saxony declared himself ready to send deputies to a council to be convened at Trent, but only under the condition that the Protestants should have a share in the discussions, and that the Pope should not be considered as the presiding officer and judge. This declaration was partly due to advice from Melanchthon. As it was agreed upon to send a confession to Trent, Melanchthon drew up the Confessio Saxonica, a repetition of the Augsburg Confession, discussing in greater detail the points of controversy with Rome. On his way to Trent at Dresden in March 1552, he saw the military preparations of Maurice of Saxony, and after reaching Nuremberg, he returned to Wittenberg, as Maurice had turned against the emperor. After his return, the condition of the Protestants became more favourable and were still more so at the Peace of Augsburg (1555). However Melanchthon's difficulties increased from that time.

The last years of his life were embittered by disputes over the Interim and the freshly started controversy on the Lord's Supper. As the statement "good works are necessary for salvation" appeared in the Leipzig Interim, in 1551 its Lutheran opponents attacked Georg Major, Melanchthon's friend and disciple. Melanchthon dropped the formula altogether, seeing how easily it could be misunderstood.

His opponents continued to go against him, accusing him of synergism and Zwinglianism. At the Colloquy of Worms in 1557 which he had reluctantly attended, the adherents of Flacius and the Saxon theologians tried to humiliate him as a heretic. Melanchthon persevered in his efforts for the peace of the church, suggesting a synod of the Evangelical party and drawing up the Frankfurt Recess, which he defended later against attacks.

The controversies on the Lord's Supper embittered the last years of his life. The renewal of this dispute was due to the growing acceptance of Calvinistic doctrine and its influence upon Germany. He never agreed with this, and the personal presence and self-impartation of Christ in the Lord's Supper were especially important for him, although he did not definitely state how body and blood are related to this. Although rejecting the physical act of mastication, he nevertheless assumed the real presence of the body of Christ and therefore also a real self-impartation. He also differed from Calvin in emphasizing the relation of the Lord's Supper to justification.

== Views on the Virgin Mary ==
Melanchthon viewed any veneration of saints rather critically but he developed positive commentaries about Mary.

In his Annotations in Evangelia, he wrote a study on Luke 2:52, and discussed Mary's faith. He noted that "she kept all things in her heart" which to him was a call to the church to follow her example. He believed that Mary was negligent when she lost her son in the temple, but she did not sin. He also believed that Mary was conceived with original sin like every other human being, but she was spared the consequences of it. As such, he opposed the feast of the Immaculate Conception, which at the time, was not dogma, but was celebrated in several cities and had been approved at the Council of Basel in 1439. He declared that the Immaculate Conception was an invention of monks. He saw Mary as a representation (typus) of the church and believed that in the Magnificat, Mary spoke for the whole church. Standing under the cross, Mary suffered like no other human being; as such, he believed that Christians have to unite with her under the cross, in order to become Christ-like.

== Views on natural philosophy ==
In lecturing on the Librorum de judiciis astrologicis of Ptolemy in 1535–1536, Melanchthon expressed to students his interest in Greek mathematics, astronomy and astrology. He considered that a purposeful God had reasons to exhibit comets and eclipses. He was the first to print a paraphrased edition of Ptolemy's Tetrabiblos in Basel, 1554. Natural philosophy, in his view, was directly linked to Providence, a point of view that was influential in curriculum change after the Protestant Reformation in Germany. In the period 1536-1539 he was involved in three academic innovations: the refoundation of Wittenberg along Protestant lines, the reorganization at Tübingen, and the foundation of the University of Leipzig.

== Death ==
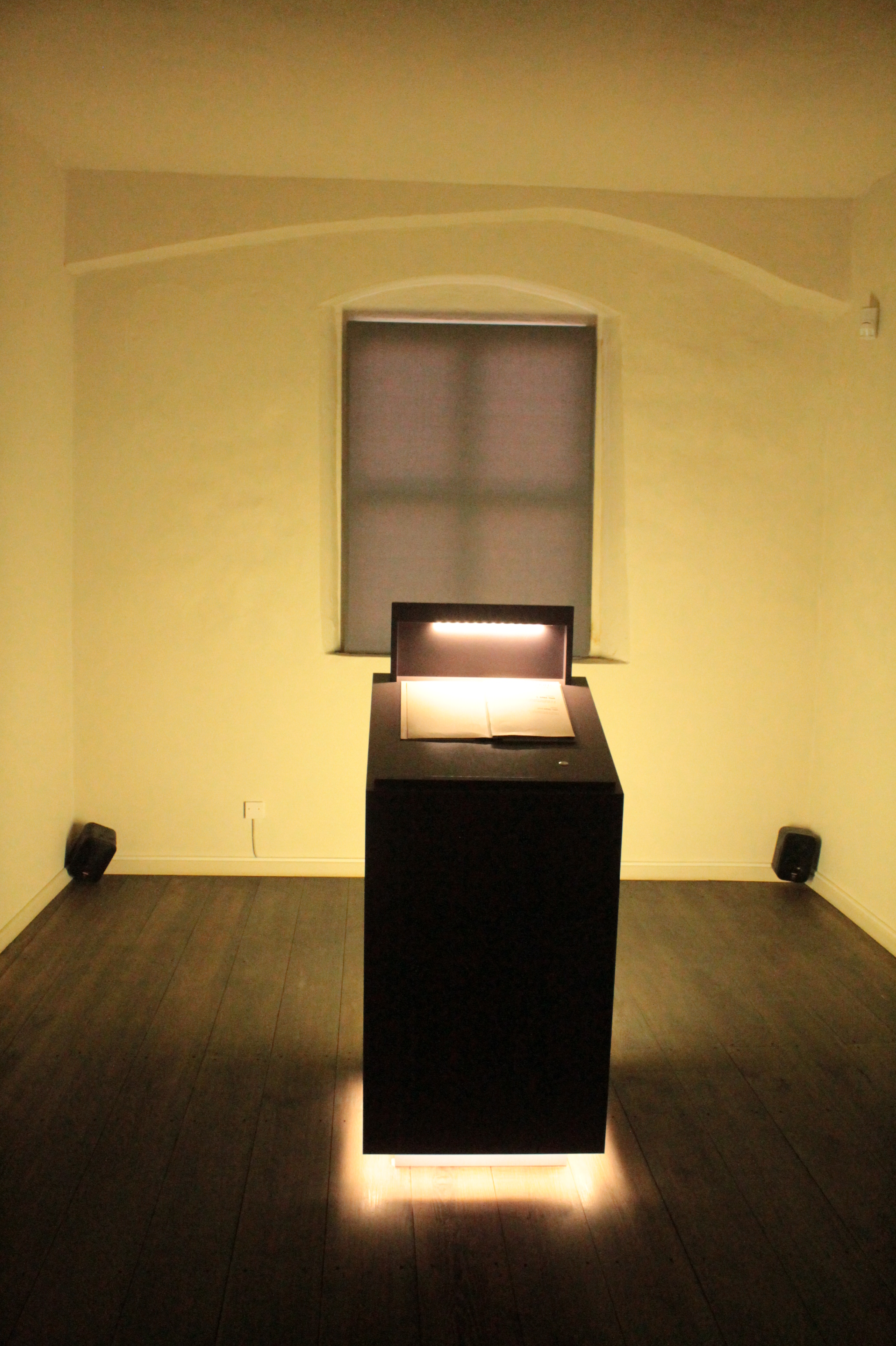
The room in which Melanchthon died, Melanchthon's house. Wittenberg

Before these theological dissensions were settled, Melanchthon died. Only a few days before his death, he had written a note which gave his reasons for not fearing death. On the left hand side of the note were the words, "You will be delivered from sins, and be freed from the acrimony and fury of theologians"; on the right, "You will go to the light, see God, look upon his Son, learn those wonderful mysteries which you have not been able to understand in this life." The immediate cause of death was a severe cold which he had contracted on a journey to Leipzig in March 1560, followed by a fever that consumed his strength, although his body had already been weakened. He was pronounced dead on 19 April 1560. His body was buried beside Luther's in the Schloßkirche in Wittenberg.

In Melanchthon's last moments, he continued to worry over the desolate condition of the church. He prayed continually and listened to passages of Scripture. The words of John 1:11-12 were especially significant to him - "His own received him not; but as many as received him, to them gave he power to become the sons of God." When Caspar Peucer, his son-in-law, asked him if he wanted anything, he replied, "Nothing but heaven."

He is commemorated in the Calendar of Saints of the Lutheran Church - Missouri Synod on 16 February, his birthday, and in the calendar of the Evangelical Lutheran Church in America on 25 June, the date of the presentation of the Augsburg Confession.

== Estimation of his works and character ==
=== Relationship with Luther ===
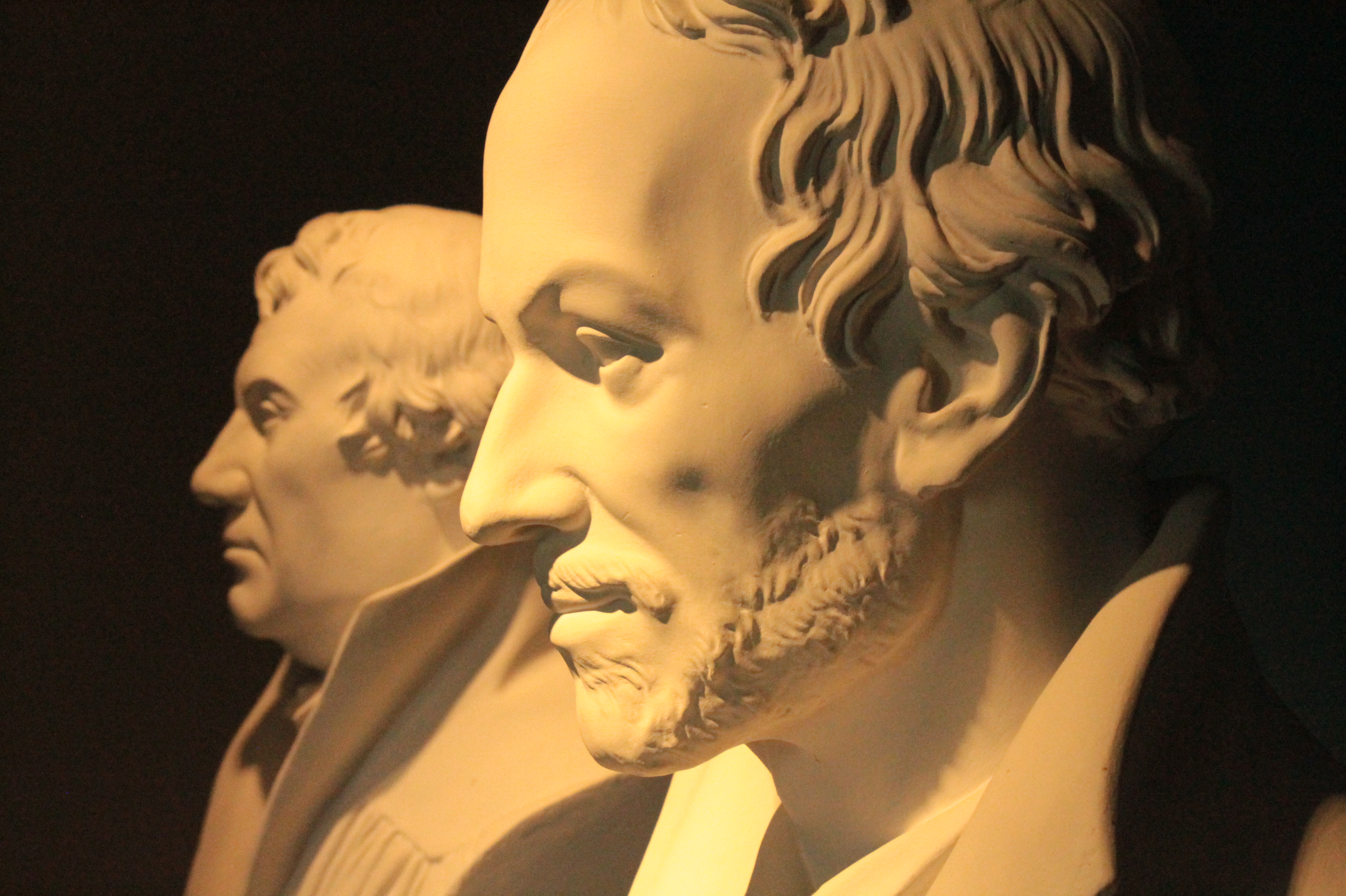
Melanchthon with Luther behind, by Johann Gottfried Schadow, Melanchthon House Museum, Wittenberg

Melanchthon's importance for the Reformation lay essentially in the fact that he systematized Luther's ideas, defended them in public, and made them the basis of a religious education. These two figures, by complementing each other, could be said to have harmoniously achieved the results of the Reformation. Melanchthon was impelled by Luther to work for the Reformation; his own inclinations would have kept him in academia. Without Luther's influence he could have been "a second Erasmus", although he had a deep religious interest in the Reformation. While Luther scattered the sparks among the people, Melanchthon had the sympathy of educated people and scholars. Both Luther's strength of faith and Melanchthon's calmness, temperance and love of peace, had a share in the success of the movement.

Both were aware of their mutual position and they thought of it as a "divine necessity". Melanchthon wrote in 1520, "I would rather die than be separated from Luther", whom he also compared to Elijah, and called him "the man full of the Holy Ghost". In spite of the strained relations between them in the last years of Luther's life, Melanchthon said at Luther's death, "Dead is the horseman and chariot of Israel who ruled the church in this last age of the world!"

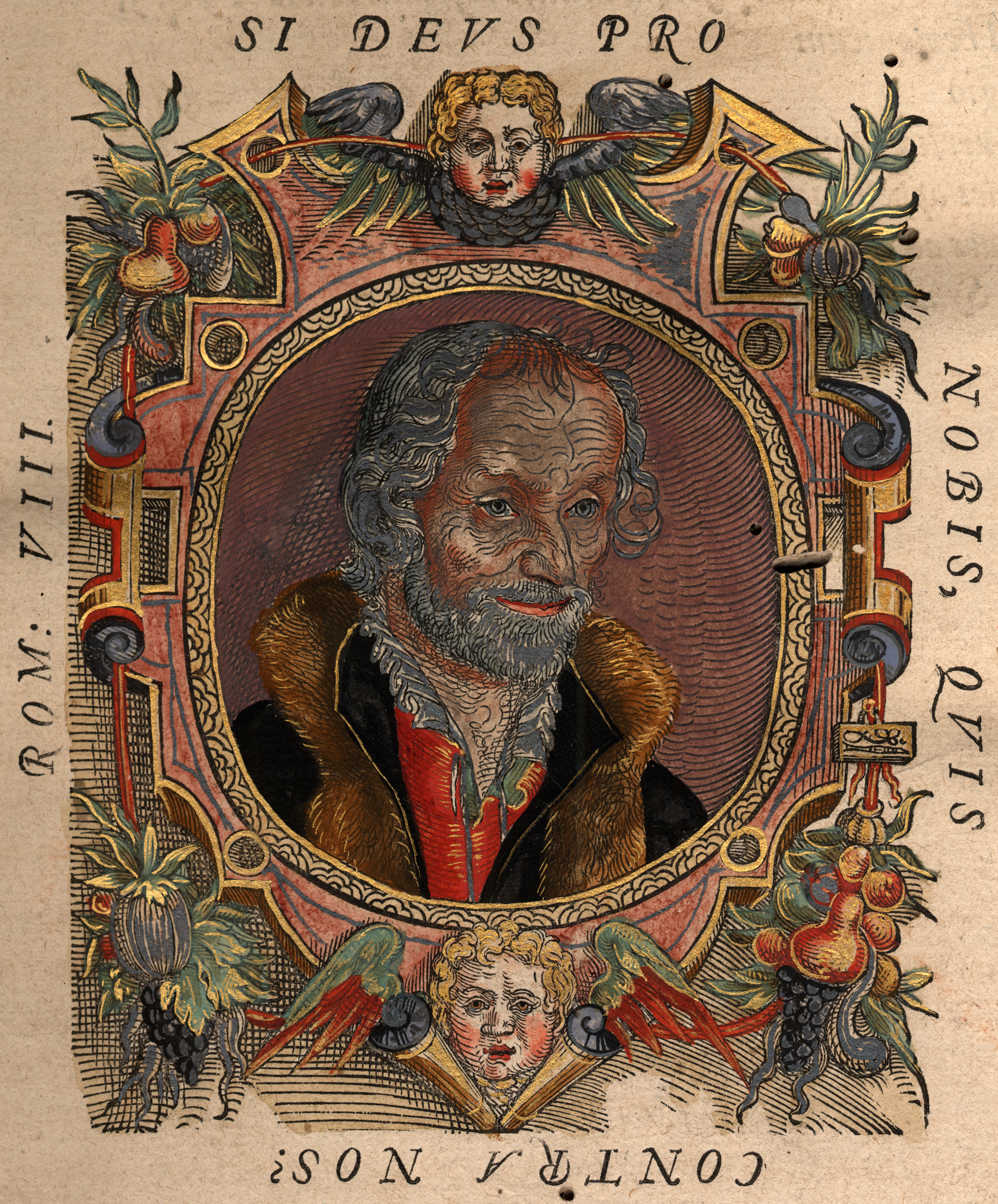
Portrait of Philipp Melanchthon by Lucas Cranach the Younger, c. 1562

In the preface to Melanchthon's Kolosserkommentar (1529), Luther wrote, "I had to fight with rabble and devils, for which reason my books are very warlike. I am the rough pioneer who must break the road; but Master Philip comes along softly and gently, sows and waters heartily, since God has richly endowed him with gifts." Luther also praised Melanchthon's revised Loci and called him "a divine instrument which has achieved the very best in the department of theology to the great rage of the devil and his scabby tribe." Luther never spoke directly against Melanchthon. However often he was dissatisfied with Melanchthon's actions, he never uttered a word against his private character, although Melanchthon sometimes evinced a lack of confidence in Luther. In a letter to Carlowitz, before the Diet of Augsburg, he protested that Luther, with his hot-headed nature, exercised a personally humiliating pressure upon him.

The distinction between Luther and Melanchthon is well brought out in Luther's letters to the latter (June 1530):

To your great anxiety by which you are made weak, I am a cordial foe; for the cause is not ours. It is your philosophy, and not your theology, which tortures you so, - as though you could accomplish anything by your useless anxieties. So far as the public cause is concerned, I am well content and satisfied; for I know that it is right and true, and, what is more, it is the cause of Christ and God himself. For that reason, I am merely a spectator. If we fall, Christ will likewise fall; and if he fall, I would rather fall with Christ than stand with the emperor.

=== His work as reformer ===
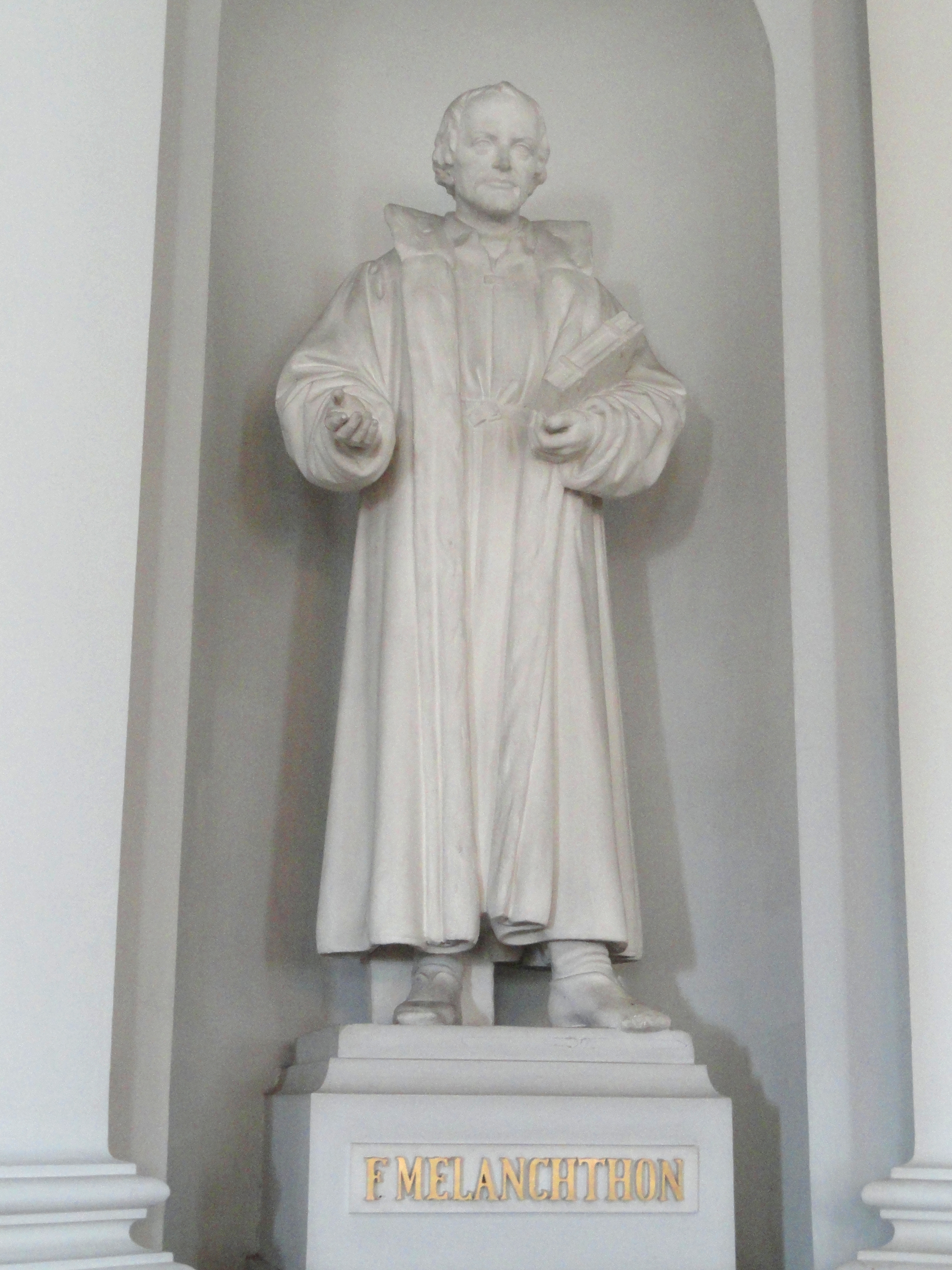
The statue of Melanchthon at the Helsinki Lutheran Cathedral in Helsinki, Finland

As a reformer, Melanchthon's work was characterized by moderation, conscientiousness, caution, and love of peace; however these qualities were sometimes said to only be lack of decision, consistence, and courage. His main priority was for the welfare of the community and for the quiet development of the church.

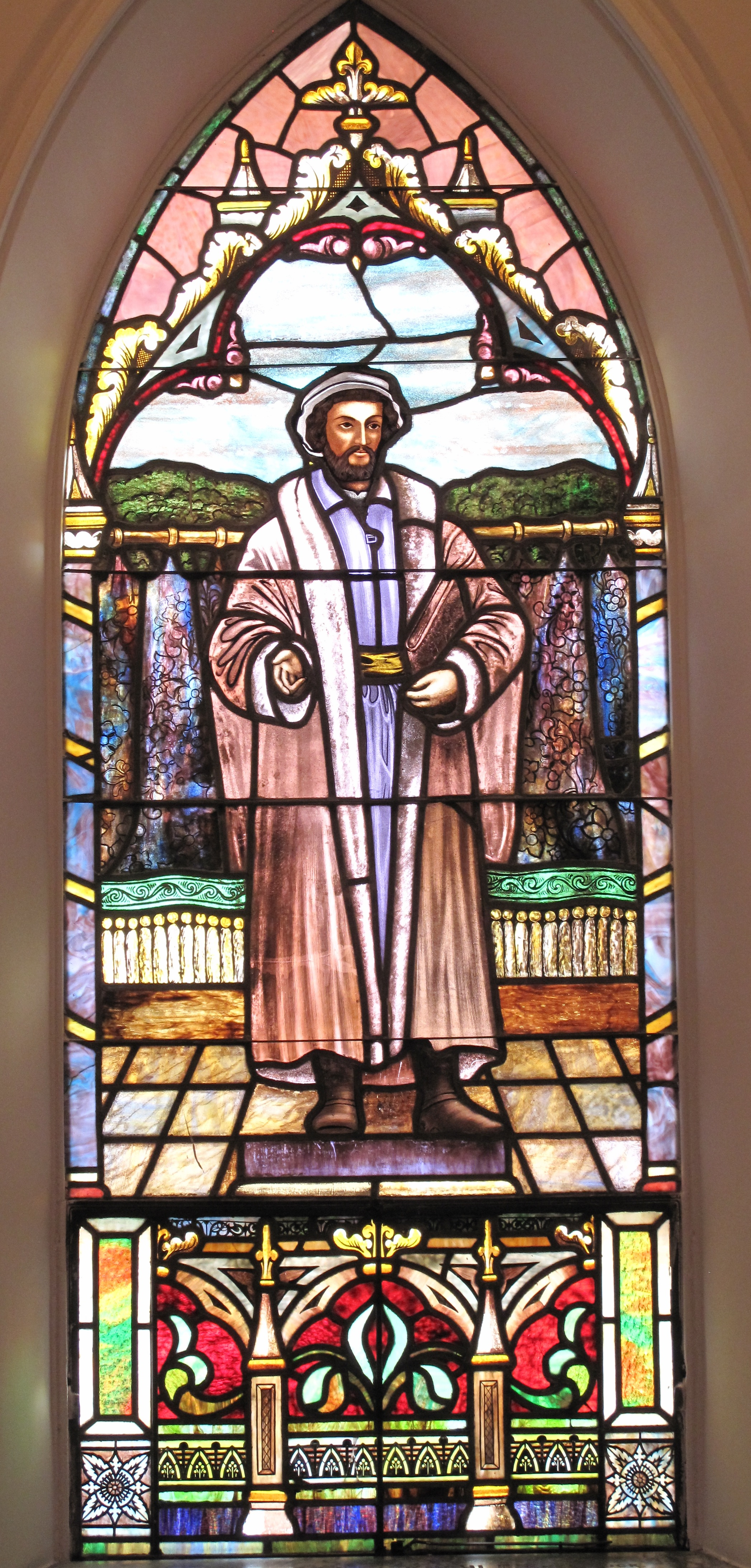
The Melanchthon window attributed to the Quaker City Stained Glass Company of Philadelphia, Pennsylvania, at St. Matthew's German Evangelical Lutheran Church in Charleston, South Carolina

Melanchthon had an innate aversion to quarrels and discord; yet, often he was very irritable. His irenical character often led him to adapt himself to the views of others, as may be seen from his correspondence with Erasmus and from his public attitude from the Diet of Augsburg to the Interim. It was said not to be merely a personal desire for peace, but his conservative religious nature that guided him in his acts of conciliation. He never could forget that his father on his death-bed had besought his family "never to leave the church." He stood toward the history of the church in an attitude of piety and reverence that made it much more difficult for him than for Luther to be content with the thought of the impossibility of a reconciliation with the Catholic Church. He laid stress upon the authority of the Church Fathers, not only of Augustine, but also of the Greek Fathers.

His attitude in matters of worship was conservative, and in the Leipsic Interim he was said by Cordatus and Schenk even to be Crypto-Catholic. He did not look for a reconciliation with Catholicism at the price of pure doctrine. He attributed more value to the external appearance and organization of the Church than Luther did, as can be seen from his treatment of the "doctrine of the church". The ideal conception of the church, which he expressed in Loci in 1535, later lost its prominence when he began to emphasize the conception of the true visible church as it may be found among the Protestants.

He believed that the relation of the church to God was that the church held the divine office of the ministry of the Gospel. The universal priesthood was for Melanchthon as for Luther no principle of an ecclesiastical constitution, but a purely religious principle. In accordance with this idea he tried to keep the traditional church constitution and government, including the bishops. He did not want, however, a church altogether independent of the state, but rather, in agreement with Luther, he believed it the duty of the secular authorities to protect religion and the church. He looked upon the consistories as ecclesiastical courts which therefore should be composed of spiritual and secular judges, as he believed that the official authority of the church did not lie in a special class of priests, but rather in the whole congregation, to be represented therefore not only by ecclesiastics, but also by laymen. In advocating church union he did not overlook differences in doctrine for the sake of common practical tasks.

The older he grew, the less he distinguished between the Gospel as the announcement of the will of God, and right doctrine as the human knowledge of it. He took pains to safeguard unity in doctrine by theological formulas of union, but these were made as broad as possible and were restricted to the needs of practical religion.

=== As scholar ===
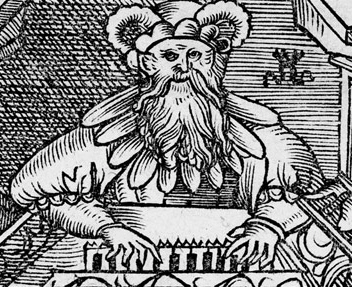
Detail from Unterricht der Visitatorn, an die Pfarherrn in Hertzog Heinrichs zu Sachsen Fürstenthum, Gleicher form der Visitation im Kurfürstenthum gestellet, woodcut by Lucas Cranach the Younger, Wittenberg, 1539

As a scholar Melanchthon embodied the spiritual culture of his age. His writing was simple and clear; his manuals, even if they were not always original, were quickly introduced into schools and kept their place for more than a century. For him, knowledge existed only for the service of moral and religious education, and so the teacher of Germany prepared the way for the religious thoughts of the Reformation. He was an important figure in the movement known as Christian humanism, which exerted a lasting influence upon scientific life in Germany.

Melanchthon wrote many treatises on education and learning that present some of his views on the basis, method, and goal of reformed education. In his "Book of Visitation", Melanchthon outlines a school plan that recommends schools to teach Latin only. He suggests children should be broken up into three distinct groups: children who are learning to read, children who know how to read and are ready to learn grammar, and children who are well-trained in grammar and syntax. Melanchthon also believed that the disciplinary system of the classical "seven liberal arts", and the sciences studied in the higher faculties could not encompass the new revolutionary discoveries of the age in terms of either content or method. He expanded the traditional categorization of science in several directions, incorporating not only history, geography and poetry but also the new natural sciences in his system of scholarly disciplines.

=== As theologian ===
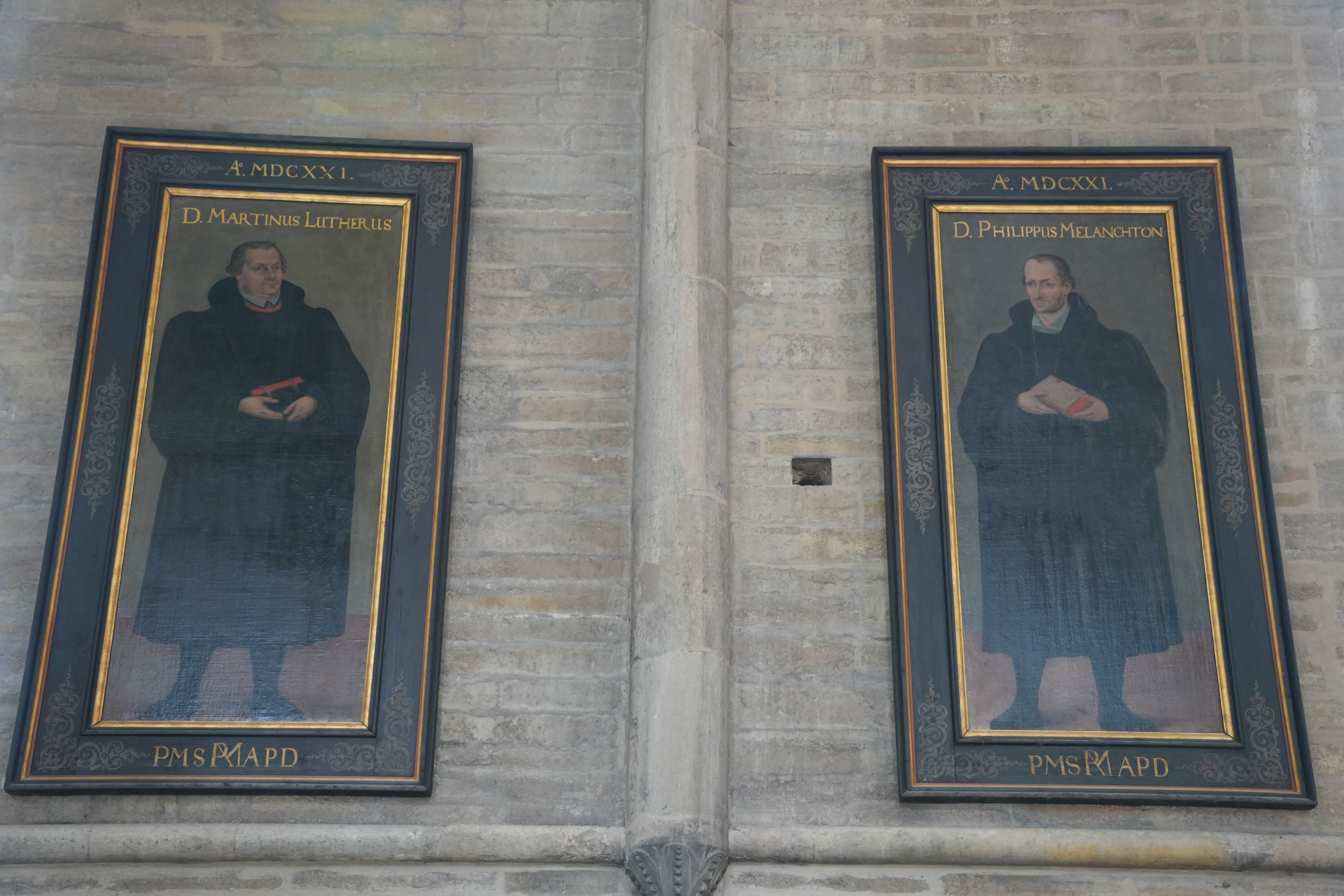
Paintings of Evangelical-Lutheran divines Martin Luther and Philipp Melanchthon at Linköping Cathedral

As a theologian, his strength lay in collecting and systematizing the ideas of others, especially of Luther, for the purpose of instruction. He kept to the practical, and did not look at the connection of the parts, and his Loci were in the form of isolated paragraphs. His humanistic mode of thought formed the basis of his theology so that he acknowledged moral and religious truths outside of Christianity, and brought Christian truth into closer contact with them, to mediate between Christian revelation and ancient philosophy.

Melanchthon's views differed from Luther's only in some modifications of ideas. Melanchthon looked upon the law as not only the correlate of the Gospel, but as the unchangeable order of the spiritual world with its basis in God himself. He distilled Luther's view of redemption to that of legal satisfaction. He did not focus on the mysticism running through Luther's theology, but emphasized the ethical and intellectual elements.

After giving up determinism and absolute predestination and ascribing a certain moral freedom to humanity, he tried to ascertain the share of free will in conversion, naming three causes as concurring in the work of conversion - the Word, the Spirit, and the human will, which was not passive, but resisting its own weakness. After 1548 he used Erasmus' definition of freedom, "the capability of applying oneself to grace."

In dividing faith into knowledge, assent, and trust, he made the participation of the heart subsequent to that of the intellect, which gave rise to the view of the later orthodoxy that the establishment and acceptation of pure doctrine should precede the personal attitude of faith. His conception of faith corresponded with his view that the Church is the communion of those who adhere to the true belief and that her visible existence depends upon the consent of her unregenerated members to her teachings.

Melanchthon's doctrine of the Lord's Supper lacked the mysticism of faith by which Luther united the sensual elements and supersensual realities. It did however demand their formal distinction.

The development of Melanchthon's beliefs may be seen from the history of the Loci. Originally he intended a development of the leading ideas representing the Evangelical conception of salvation, while the later editions approached a plan of a text-book of dogma. At first he insisted on the necessity of every event, rejected the philosophy of Aristotle, and had not fully developed his doctrine of the sacraments. In 1535 he treated for the first time the doctrine of God and that of the Trinity; he rejected the doctrine of the necessity of every event and named free will as a concurring cause in conversion. The doctrine of justification received its forensic form and the necessity of good works was emphasized in the interest of moral discipline. The last editions are distinguished from the earlier ones by the prominence given to the theoretical and rational element.

=== As moralist ===
In ethics he preserved and renewed the tradition of ancient morality and represented the Protestant conception of life. His books on morals were chiefly drawn from the classics, and were influenced not so much by Aristotle as by Cicero. His principal works in this line were Prolegomena to Cicero's De officiis (1525); Enarrationes librorum Ethicorum Aristotelis (1529); Epitome philosophiae moralis (1538); and Ethicae doctrinae elementa (1550).

In his Epitome philosophiae moralis he considers the relation of philosophy to the law of God and the Gospel. Moral principles are knowable in the light of reason. Melanchthon calls these the law of God, and being endowed in human nature by God, so also the law of nature. The virtuous pagans had not yet developed the ideas of Original Sin and the Fall, or the fallen aspect of human nature itself, and so could not articulate or explain why humans did not always act virtuously. If virtue was the true law of human nature (having been put there by God himself) than the light of reason could only be darkened by sin. The revealed law, necessitated because of sin, is distinguished from natural law only by its greater completeness and clearness. The fundamental order of moral life can be grasped also by reason; therefore the development of moral philosophy from natural principles must not be neglected. Melanchthon therefore made no sharp distinction between natural and revealed morals.

His contribution to Christian ethics in the proper sense can be seen in the Augsburg Confession and its Apology as well as in his Loci, where he followed Luther in depicting the Protestant ideal of life, the free realization of the divine law by a personality blessed in faith and filled with the spirit of God.

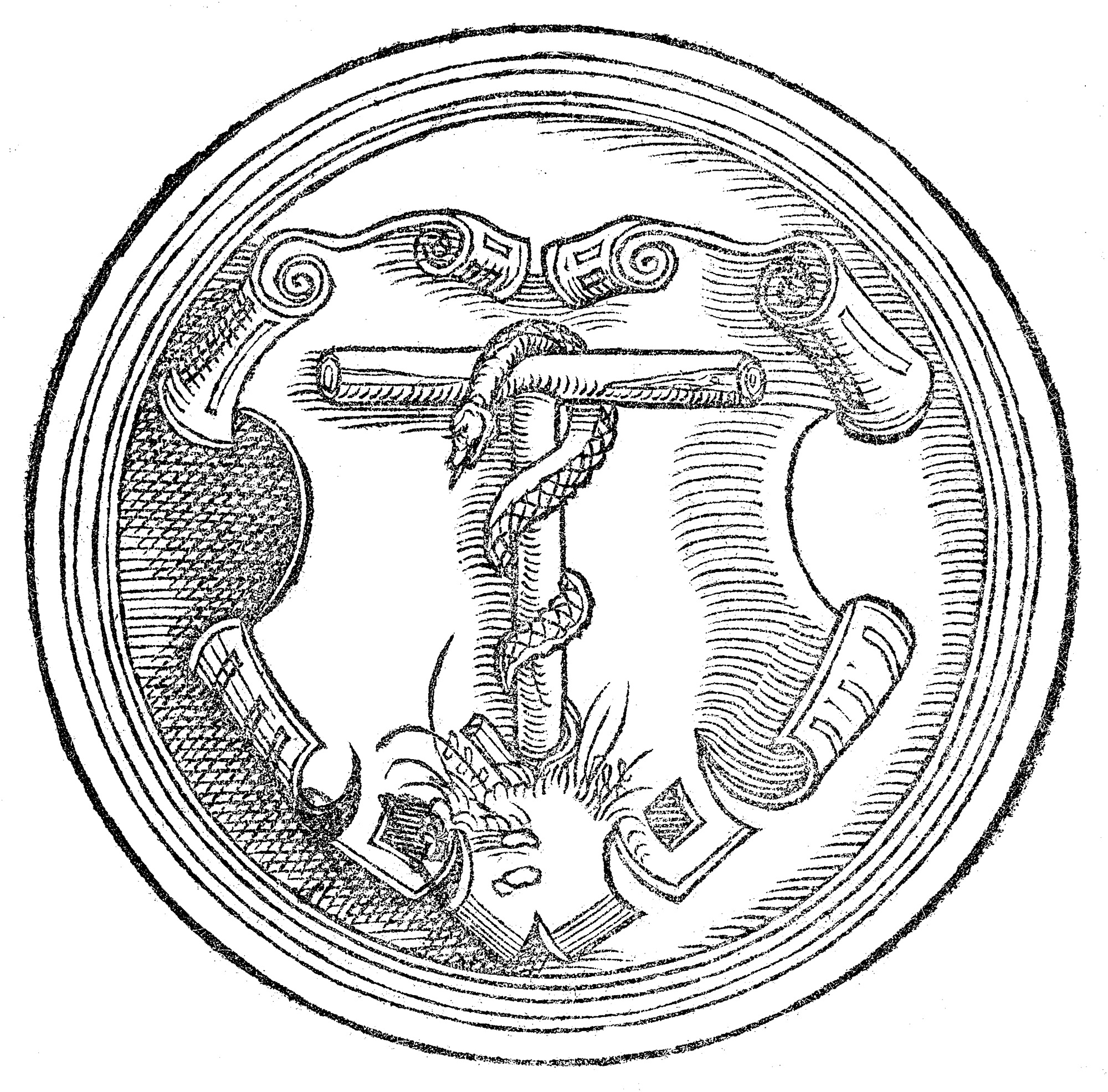
Crest of Philipp Melanchthon, featuring the bronze serpent of Moses

=== As exegete ===
Melanchthon's formulation of the authority of Scripture became the norm for some time. The principle of his hermeneutics is expressed in his words: "Every theologian and faithful interpreter of the heavenly doctrine must necessarily be first a grammarian, then a dialectician, and finally a witness." By "grammarian" he meant the philologist who is master of history, archaeology, and ancient geography. For the method of interpretation, he insisted on the unity of the sense and upon the literal sense in contrast to the four senses of the scholastics. He further stated that whatever is looked for in the words of Scripture, outside of the literal sense, is only dogmatic or practical application.

His commentaries are full of theological and practical matter, confirming the doctrines of the Reformation. The most important are those on Genesis, Proverbs, Daniel, the Psalms, Romans (edited in 1522 against his will by Luther), Colossians (1527), and John (1523). Melanchthon worked with Luther in his translation of the Bible, and both the books of the Maccabees in Luther's Bible are ascribed to him. A Latin Bible published in 1529 at Wittenberg is designated as a joint work of Melanchthon and Luther.

=== As historian and preacher ===
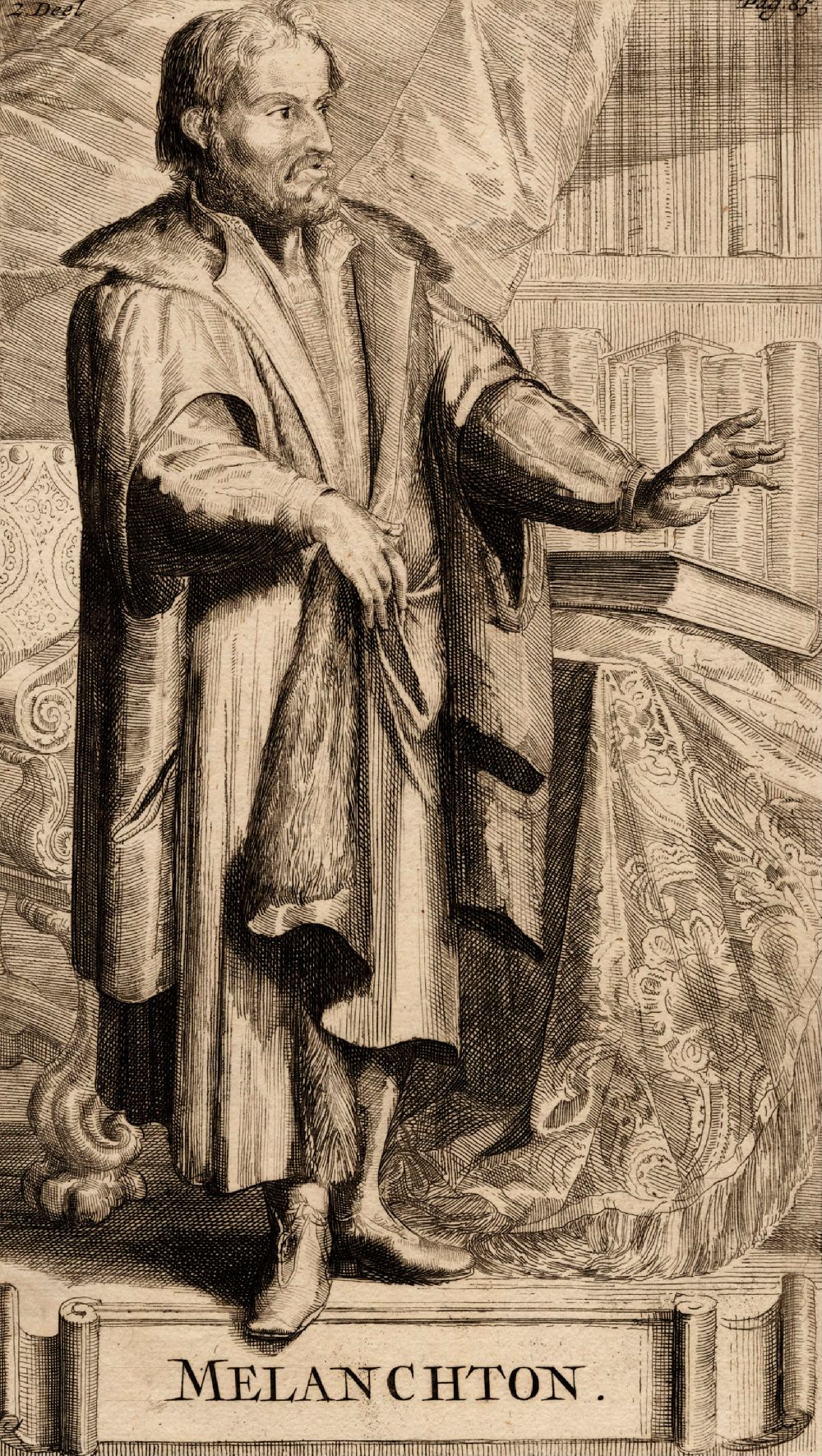
Anonymous Netherlands, Portrait of Melanchthon, early 18th century, engraving and etching

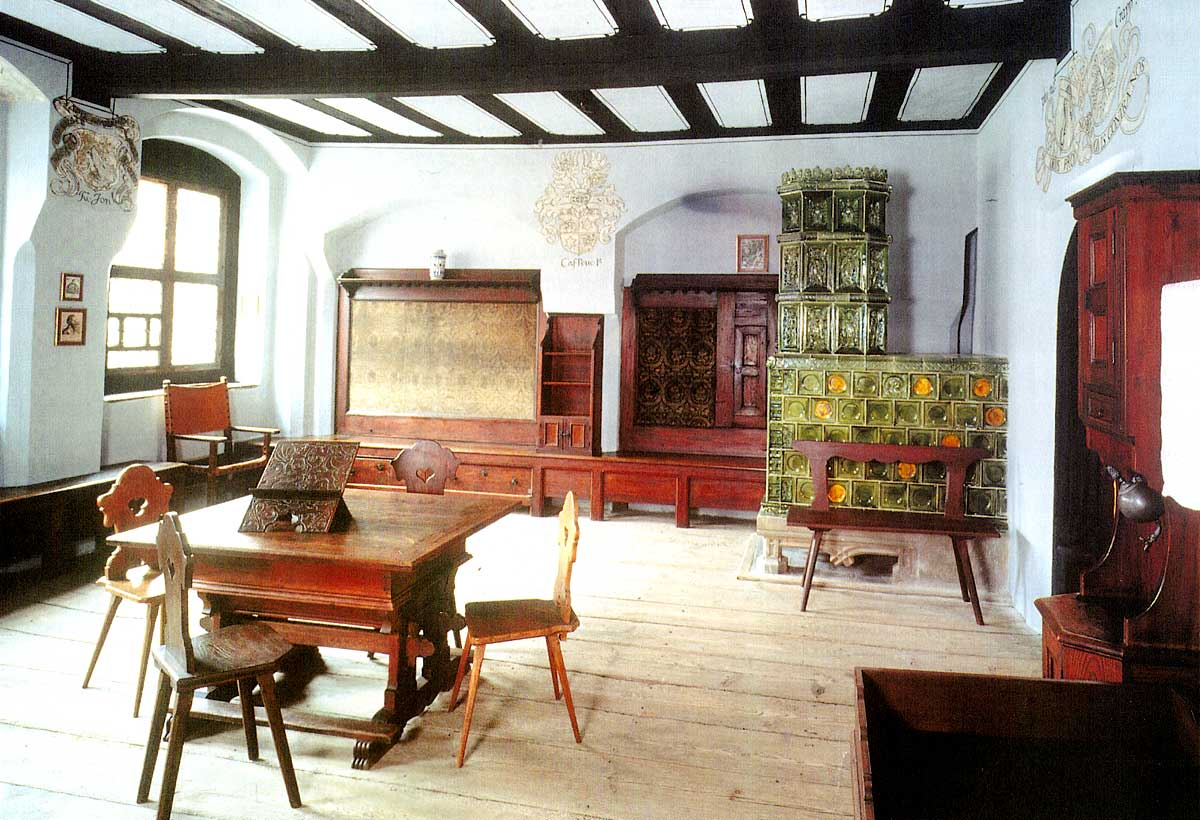
Melanchthon's room in Wittenberg

Melanchthon's influence in historical theology was felt until the seventeenth century, especially in the method of treating church history in connection with political history. His was the first Protestant attempt at a history of dogma with both Sententiae veterum aliquot patrum de caena domini (1530) and De ecclesia et auctoritate verbi Dei (1539).

Melanchthon exerted a wide influence in homiletics, and has been regarded in the Protestant church as the author of the methodical style of preaching. He stayed aloof from dogmatizing or rhetoric in the Annotationes in Evangelia (1544), the Conciones in Evangelium Matthaei (1558), and in his German sermons prepared for George of Anhalt. He never preached from the pulpit and his Latin sermons (Postilla) were prepared for the Hungarian students at Wittenberg who did not understand German.

In 1548 he published the History of the Life and Acts of Luther. In this book, he includes the image of Luther nailing the 95 Theses to the Door of Castle Church in Wittenberg. However, he had not met Luther at this time and Luther himself never mentioned this event.

Melanchthon also produced the first Protestant work on the method of theological study, as well as his Catechesis puerilis (1532), a religious manual for younger students, and a German catechism (1549).

=== As professor and philosopher ===
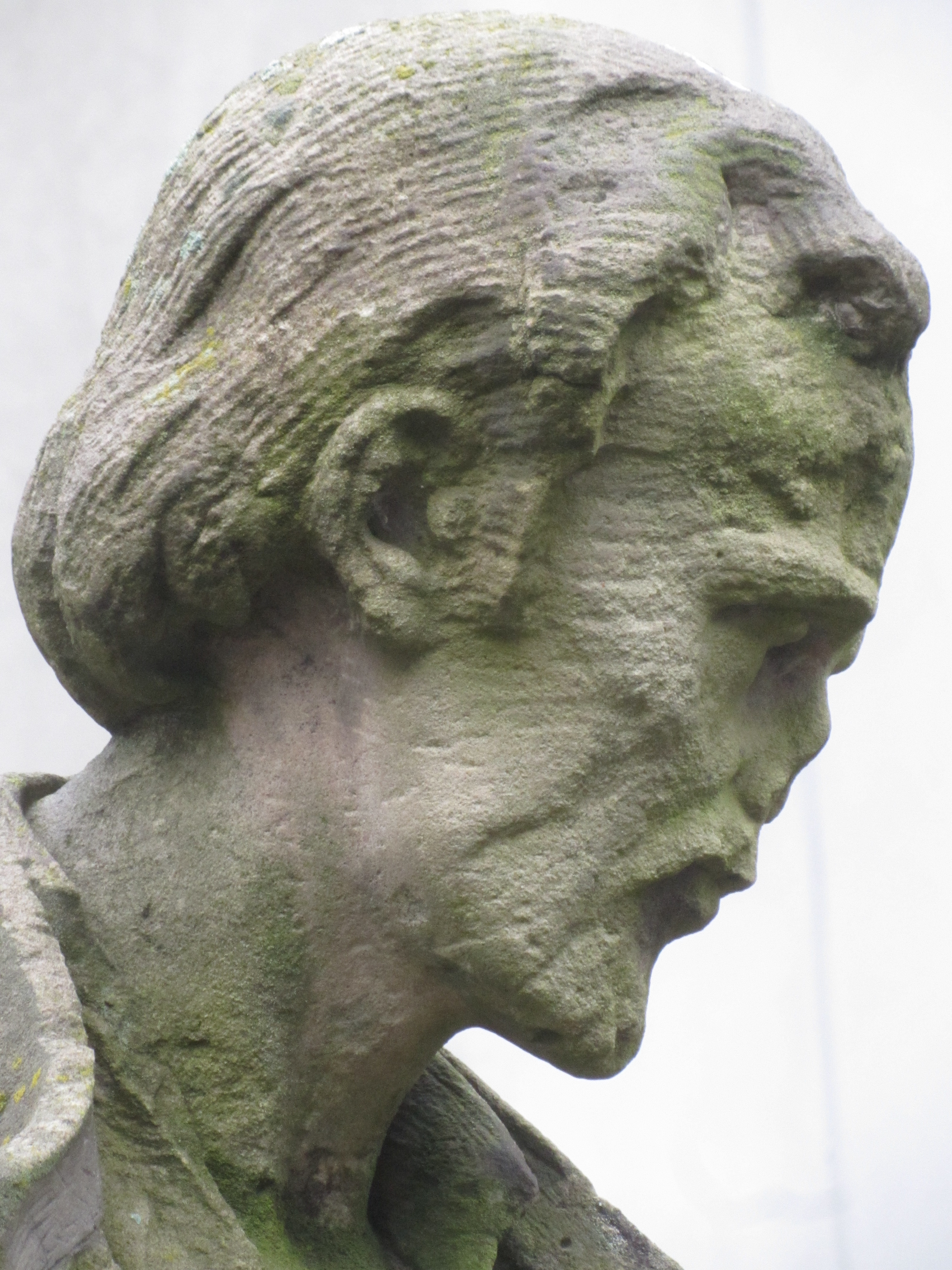
Head of Melanchthon statue at Lessing-Gymnasium (Frankfurt), whose founder had been influenced by personal contacts with Melanchthon

As a philologist and pedagogue Melanchthon was the spiritual heir of the South German Humanists, such as Reuchlin, Jakob Wimpfeling, and Rodolphus Agricola, who represented an ethical conception of the humanities. He saw the liberal arts and a classical education as paths, not only towards natural and ethical philosophy, but also towards divine philosophy. The ancient classics were seen as the sources of a purer knowledge, and also the best means of educating the youth both by their beauty of form and by their ethical content. By his activity in educational institutions and his compilations of Latin and Greek grammars and commentaries, he became the founder of the learned schools of Evangelical Germany, using a combination of humanistic and Christian ideals. The influence of his philosophical compendia ended only with the rule of the Leibniz–Wolff school.

He came to Wittenberg with the plan of editing the complete works of Aristotle and he edited the Rhetoric (1519) and the Dialectic (1520).

He believed that the relation of philosophy to theology is characterized by the distinction between Law and Gospel. The former, as a light of nature, is innate; it also contains the elements of the natural knowledge of God which, however, have been obscured and weakened by sin. Therefore, renewed promulgation of the Law by revelation became necessary and was furnished in the Decalogue; and all law, including that in the form of natural philosophy, contains only demands, shadowings; its fulfillment is given only in the Gospel, the object of certainty in theology, by which also the philosophical elements of knowledge - experience, principles of reason, and syllogism - receive only their final confirmation. As the law is a divinely ordered pedagogue that leads to Christ, philosophy, its interpreter, is subject to revealed truth as the principal standard of opinions and life.

He published De dialecta libri iv (1528), Erotemata dialectices (1547), Liber de anima (1540), Initia doctrinae physicae (1549), and Ethicae doctrinae elementa (1550).

=== Personal appearance and character ===
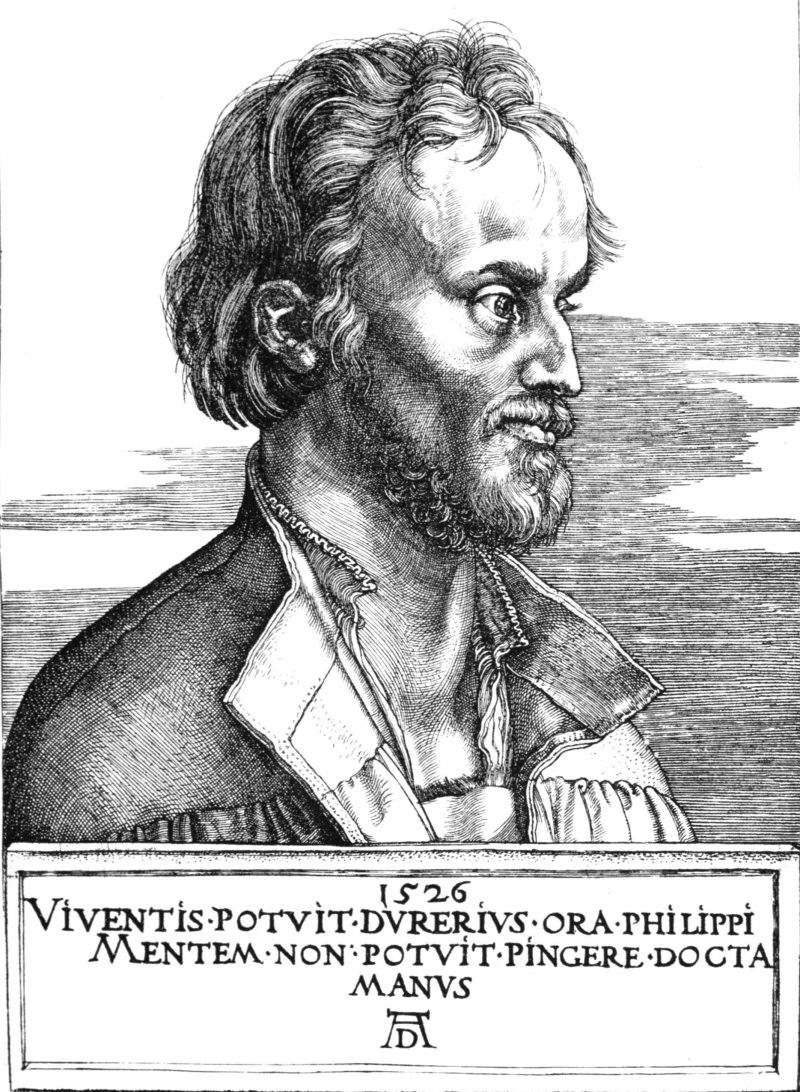
Engraving of Melanchthon in 1526 by Albrecht Dürer captioned, "Dürer was able to draw the living Philip's face, but the learned hand could not paint his spirit" (translated from Latin)

There have been preserved original portraits of Melanchthon by three famous painters of his time - Hans Holbein the Younger with one version in the Royal Gallery of Hanover, Albrecht Dürer and Lucas Cranach the Elder. Melanchthon was described as being dwarfish, misshapen, and physically weak, although he is said to have had a bright and sparkling eye, which kept its colour till the day of his death.

He did not value money and possessions; his hospitality was often misused in such a way that his Swabian servant sometimes had difficulty in managing the household. His domestic life was happy. He called his home "a little church of God", always found peace there, and showed a tender solicitude for his wife and children. A French scholar once found him rocking the cradle with one hand, and holding a book in the other.

His closest friend was Joachim Camerarius, whom he called the half of his soul. His extensive correspondence forms a commentary on his life. He wrote speeches and scientific treatises for others, permitting them to use their own signatures. He acknowledged his faults even to opponents like Flacius, and was open to criticism. He laid great stress upon prayer, daily meditation on the Bible, and attendance of public service.

== See also ==
- Dimitrije Ljubavić
- Gottlob Frege, notable descendant of Melanchthon
- List of Erasmus's correspondents
- Lotharian legend, disproven theory disseminated by Philipp Melanchthon
- Philippists
- Ubiquitarians
