= Melanchthonhaus (Bretten) =

Protestant Reformation museum and research facility

Coordinates: 49°02′13″N 8°42′25″E

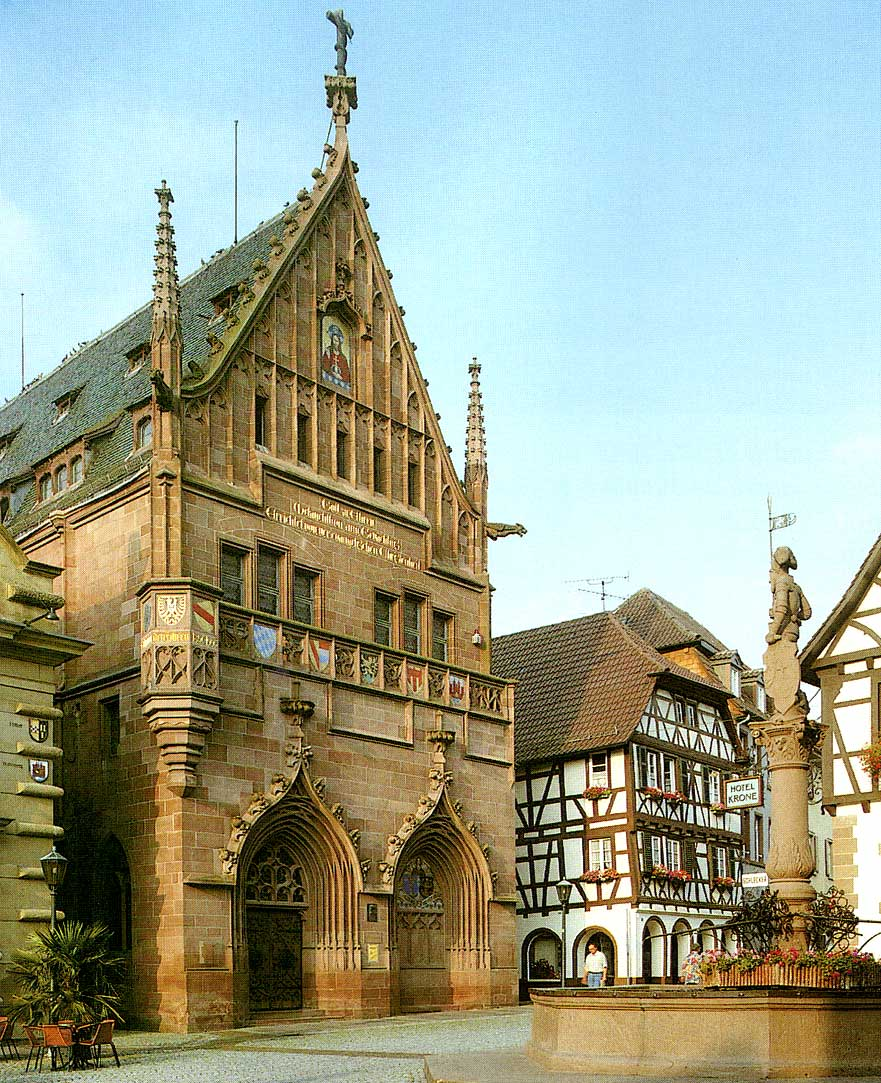
Melanchthonhaus in Bretten

The Melanchthonhaus is a museum and research facility of the Protestant Reformation in Bretten, particularly on the life of Philipp Melanchthon. It includes an exhibition on his life, a research centre, a specialist library and a documentation centre of the international Melanchthon-Forschung. The library contains around 11,000 books about the history of the Reformation.

It was built in 1897 on the site of Melanchthon's birthplace, which had been demolished in 1689. Its design by Johannes Vollmer was inspired by the church historian and theologian Nikolaus Müller. It was built by Hermann Billing and Wilhelm Jung and opened on 25 June 1903.
