= List of Protestant Reformers =

This is an alphabetical list of Protestant Reformers.

== A ==
- Johannes Aepinus
- Johann Agricola Eisleben
- Ludwig Agricola
- Mikael Agricola
- Stephan Agricola
- Erasmus Alber
- Matthäus Alber
- Alexander Alesius
- Symphorian Altbießer
- Andreas Althamer
- Menso Alting
- Johannes Amandi
- Nikolaus von Amsdorf
- Jakob Andreae
- Laurentius Andreae
- Georg Aportanus
- Caspar Aquila
- Benedictus Aretius
- James Arminius
- Jan Augusta
- Johannes Aurifaber (Vimariensis)
- Johannes Aurifaber (Vratislaviensis)

== B ==
- Johannes Bader
- Bartholomäus Bernhardi
- Louis de Berquin
- Jacob Beurlin
- Christian Beyer
- Hartmann Beyer
- Johann Bernhard
- Théodore de Bèze
- Theodor Bibliander
- Theobald Billicanus
- Ambrosius Blarer
- Andreas Bodenstein
- Hermann Bonnus
- Anne Boleyn
- Caspar Borner
- Martin Borrhaus
- Johannes Brenz
- Guido de Bres
- Johann Briesmann
- Gregor Brück
- Leonhard Brunner
- Martin Bucer
- George Buchanan
- Georg Buchholzer
- Johannes Bugenhagen
- Heinrich Bullinger
- Johannes Bünderlin
- Benedikt Burgauer
- Adrian Buxschott

== C ==
- Michael Caelius
- John Calvin
- Wolfgang Capito
- Andreas Cellarius (theologian)
- Michael Cellarius
- Martin Chemnitz
- David Chyträus
- Adolf Clarenbach
- John Colet
- Johannes Comander
- Konrad Cordatus
- Anton Corvinus
- Thomas Cranmer
- Thomas Cromwell
- Caspar Cruciger der Jüngere
- Caspar Cruciger der Ältere
- Abraham Culvensis
- Alexander Cunningham
- Valentin Curtius

== D ==
- Jurij Dalmatin
- Jakob Dammann
- Petrus Dathenus
- Franz Davidis
- Nikolaus Decius
- Hans Denck
- Matthias Devai
- Veit Dietrich
- Johann Draconites
- Johannes Dreyer
- Johann Dölsch
- Balthasar Düring
- Henry Denne

== E ==
- Paul Eber
- Johann Eberlin von Günzburg
- Johannes Sylvius Egranus
- Paul von Eitzen
- Christian Entfelder
- Francisco de Enzinas
- Matthias Erb

== F ==
- Theodor Fabricius
- Paul Fagius
- Guillaume Farel
- Matthias Flacius
- Johann Forster
- Martin Frecht
- Sebastian Fröschel
- Johannes Frosch

== G ==
- Philipp Gallicius
- Nicolaus Gallus
- Thomas Gassner
- Johannes Garcreus
- Gerard Geldenhouwer
- Johannes Gigas
- Johann Glandrop
- Nikolaus Glossenus
- Kaspar Gräter
- Johannes Gramann
- Daniel Greser
- Argula von Grumbach
- Simon Grynaeus
- Augustin Gschmus
- Rudolf Gualther
- Caspar Güttel

== H ==
- Richard Hooker
- François Hotman
- Balthasar Hubmaier
- Thomas Helwys

== I ==
- Hartmann Ibach
- Christoph Irenäus
- Franz Irenicus
- Johann Isenmann, also Johann Isenmenger

== J ==
- Matthias von Jagow
- Justus Jonas der Ältere
- George Joye
- Leo Jud
- Matthäus Judex
- Franciscus Junius (the elder), also Franz Junius or François du Jon

== K ==
- Leonhard Kaiser, also Leonhard Käser, Leonhard Kaysser
- Kaspar Kantz
- Georg Parsimonius, also Karg
- Stefan Kempe
- Johann Kessler, also Johann Keßler
- Heinrich von Kettenbach
- Thomas Kirchmeyer
- Timotheus Kirchner
- Jacob Knade
- Johannes Knipstro
- Andreas Knöpken
- John Knox
- Franz Kolb (theologian)
- Adam Krafft 1493-1558
- Nikolaus Krage
- Gottschalk Kruse
- Abraomas Kulvietis
- Johannes Kymaeus

== L ==
- Johann Lachmann
- Franz Lambert von Avignon
- Johann(es) Lang(e), a Thuringian reformator
- Johannes Langer
- Hubert Languet
- Johannes á Lasco
- Hugh Latimer
- Anton Lauterbach
- Johannes Lening
- Johannes Lingarius, also Johannes Bender
- Konrad Limmer
- Wenzeslaus Linck
- Johann Lindemann (theologian), see also Johann Lindemann (Theologe)
- Kaspar Löner
- Johannes Lonicer
- Johann Lüdecke, also Johann Ludecus
- Martin Luther
- Johannes Lycaula

== M ==
- Martynas Mažvydas
- Georg Major
- Johann Mantel
- Johannes Marbacher
- Johannes Matthesius
- Hermann Marsow
- Nikolaus Medler
- Kapar Megander
- Philipp Melanchthon
- Dionysius Melander
- Justus Menius
- Angelus Merula, also Engel von Merlen
- Michael Meurer, also Michael Haenlein, Michael a Muris Galliculus
- Sebastian Meyer
- Joachim Mörlin
- Maximilian Mörlin
- Ambrosius Moibanus, also Andreas Moyben
- Jacob Montanus
- Antonius Musa, also Andreas West, Andreas Wilsch
- Simon Musaeus, also Simon Meusel
- Andreas Musculus, also Andreas Meusel
- Wolfgang Musculus
- Friedrich Myconius
- Oswald Myconius

== N ==
- Hieronymus Nopp, also Hieronymus Noppius
- Brictius thom Norde, also Nordanus

== O ==
- Bernardino Ochino
- Johannes Oekolampad, aka Oecolampadius
- Georg Oemler, also Aemelius
- Konrad Öttinger
- Kaspar Olevianus
- Gerd Omeken
- Andreas Osiander
- Jacob Other, also Jacob Otter

== P ==
- Peder Palladius
- Johannes Pappus
- Matthew Parker
- Konrad Pelikan
- Laurentius Petri
- Olaus Petri
- Caspar Peucer
- Johann Pfeffinger
- Paul Phrygio, also Paul Sidensticker, Paul Kostentzer
- Johann Pistoris, also Becker, Niddanus
- Tilemann Plettener, also Tilemann Platner
- Andreas Poach
- Georg von Polentz, also Georg von Polenz
- Johann Pollius, also Johann Polhen, Johann Polhenne
- Abdias Prätorius
- Stephan Prätorius
- Jacobus Probst
- Nikolaus Prugener

== Q ==
- Erhard von Queiß

== R ==
- Ludwig Rabus
- Balthasar Raid, also Balthasar Reith
- Stanislaus Rapagelanus
- Urbanus Rhegius
- Stephan Riccius
- Johann Reibling
- Bartholomaeus Rieseberg
- Erasmus Ritter
- Paul vom Rode
- Patroklus Römeling
- Georg Rörer
- Bartholomäus Rosinus
- Jacob Runge
- Johann Rurer
- Ranjeeth Ophir

== S ==
- Heinrich Salmuth
- Konrad Sam
- Erasmus Sarcerius
- Martin Schalling the Elder
- Martin Schalling the Younger
- Christoph Schappeler
- Georg Scharnekau
- Jacob Schenck
- Johann Schlaginhaufen, also Johann Schlainhauffen, Johann Turbicida
- Johann Schnabel
- Tilemann Schnabel
- Simon Schneeweiß
- Erhard Schnepf
- Johannes Schradin
- Gervasius Schuler
- Theobald Schwarz, also Theobald Nigri, Theobald Niger
- Kaspar Schwenckfeld
- Abraham Scultetus
- Jan Seklycian
- Nikolaus Selnecker
- Dominicus Sleupner, also Dominicus Schleupner
- Joachim Slüter, also Jochim Slyter, Jochim Dutzo
- Georg Spalatin
- Cyriakus Spangenberg
- Johann Spangenberg
- Paul Speratus
- Johann Stammel
- Michael Stiefel
- Johann Stössel
- Johannes Spreter
- Johann Stoltz
- Jacob Stratner
- Jacob Strauß
- Victorinus Strigel
- Bartholomaeus Suawe
- Simon Sulzer
- Johann Sutel

== T ==
- Hans Tausen
- Sylvester Tegetmeier
- Johann Timann
- Primož Trubar
- Hermann Tulich
- William Tyndale

== U ==
- Johann Konrad Ulmer also Johann Konrad de Ulma
- Zacharias Ursinus
- Semyon Uklein

== V ==
- Juan de Valdés
- Thomas Venatorius
- Georg von Venediger
- Pier Paolo Vergerio
- Pietro Martire Vermigli, also Peter Martyr
- Pierre Viret

== W ==
- Burkhard Waldis
- Joachim von Watt
- Adam Weiß
- Michael Weiße
- Hieronymus Weller
- Johann Westermann (theologian)
- Joachim Westphal
- Johann Wigand
- Heinrich Winkel, also Heinrich Winckel
- Justin Wintfert
- George Wishart
- Bonifatius Wolfart
- John Wycliffe
- Thomas Wyttenbach
- Roger Williams

== Z ==
- Girolamo Zanchi
- Katharina Zell, also Katharina Schütz
- Matthäus Zell
- Heinrich von Zütphen
- Johannes Zwick
- Gabriel Zwilling
- Huldrych Zwingli also Ulrich Zwingli
