= Joachim Westphal (of Hamburg) =

German "Gnesio-Lutheran" theologian and Protestant reformer

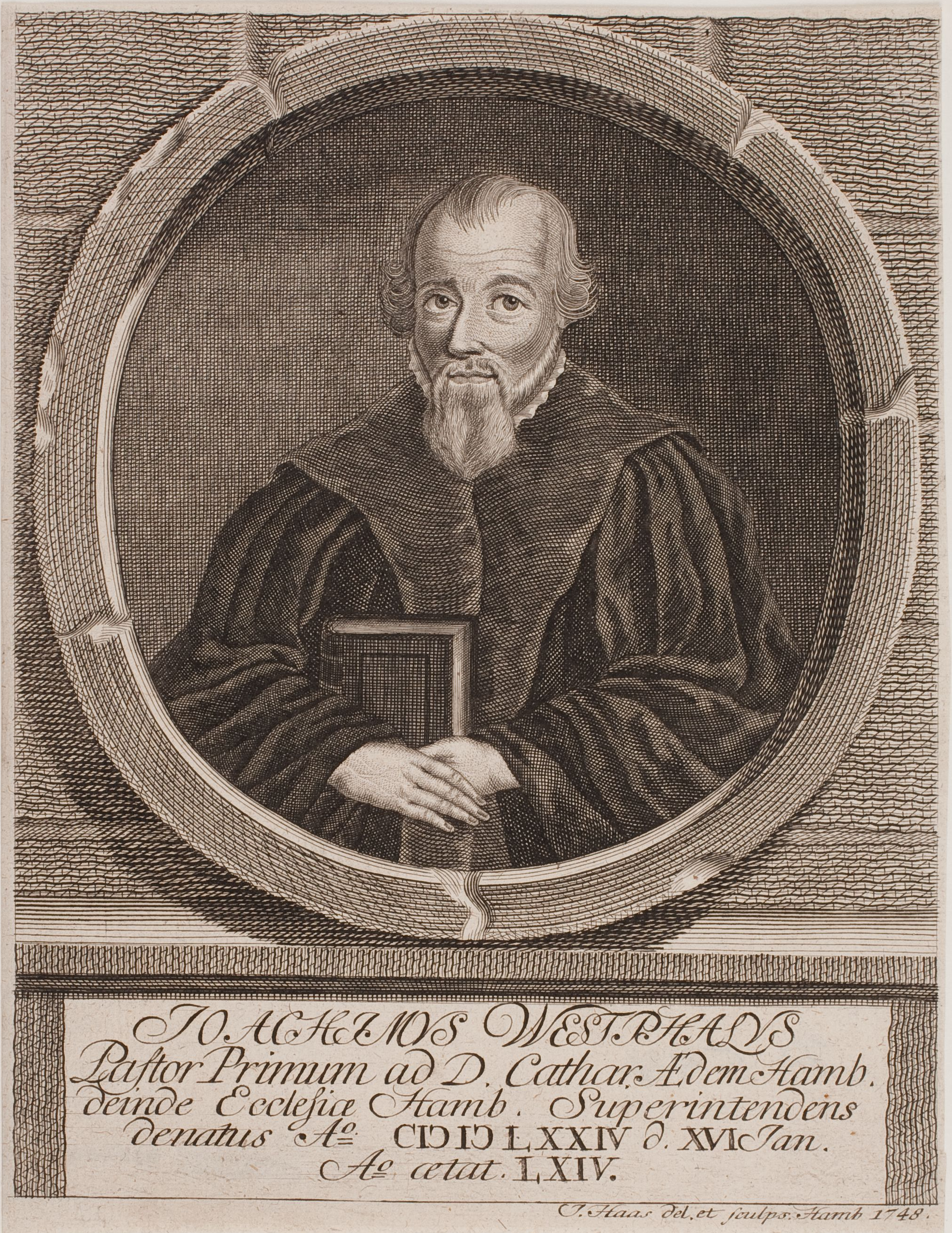
- Joachim Westphal
- Born: 1510; Hamburg
- Died: 16 January 1574 (aged 63–64); Hamburg
- Education: University of Wittenberg
- Occupation: Theologian
- Notable work: Farrago confusanearum et inter se dissidentium opinionum de coena Domini, ex Sacramentariorum libris congesta
- Theological work
- Tradition or movement: Gnesio-Lutheran

Joachim Westphal (born at Hamburg 1510 or at the beginning of 1511; died there 16 January 1574) was a German "Gnesio-Lutheran" theologian and Protestant reformer.

From 1571 to 1574 he served as Superintendent of Hamburg (per pro already since 1562), presiding as spiritual leader over the Lutheran state church of the city-state.

== Career ==
He was educated in the school of the parish of St. Nicolai in his native city, then in Lüneburg, and entered the University of Wittenberg, where he became the pupil of Melanchthon and Luther. In 1532, on the recommendation of Melanchthon, he was appointed teacher at the Johanneum in his native city. In 1534 he returned to the University of Wittenberg, and in the following year removed with the university to Jena. After his return to Wittenberg in 1537 he lectured on philology. In 1541 he became preacher of the church of St. Catharine in Hamburg; then acting superintendent in 1562, and was elected Superintendent of Hamburg in 1571.

== Theological Controversies ==
He is best known for his participation in the theological controversies of his time. In 1549, he published for the first time, a work against Melanchthon and Wittenberg entitled Hist. Vituli Aurei Aaronis Exodus 32 ad Nostra Tempora et Controv. Accommodata.

He then took part in controversies on the descent into hell, the Leipzig Interim and the Adiaphora. More important was that over the Lord's Supper. In 1552 he published Farrago confusanearum et inter se dissidentium opinionum de coena Domini, ex Sacramentariorum libris congesta, a warning against those who deny the presence of Christ in the Lord's Supper. He points out to the adherents of Luther the alarming progress which the sacramentarians had made and tries to prove the falsity of their doctrine by its diversity. In 1553 he issued Recta fides de coena Domini. This was an exegetical discussion of 1 Cor. 11 and the Words of Institution. In 1555 he published Collectanea sententiarum D. Aurelii Augustini de coena Domini and Fides Cyrilli episcopi Alexandriae de praesentia corporis et sanguinis Christi.

Calvin answered in January 1555, with his Defensio sanae et orthodoxae doctrinae de sacramentis. Thus there was opened a controversy which involved on the side of the Reformed Lasco, Bullinger, Ochino, Valerandus Polanus, Beza, and Bibliander; on the side of the Lutherans Timann, Paul von Eitzen, Schnepff, E. Alberus, Gallus, Flacius, Judex, Brenz, and Andreä. Westphal replied to Calvin in Adversus cuiusdam sacramentarii falsam criminationem iusta defensio, in qua et eucharistiae causa agitur (1555), to which Calvin answered in Secunda defensio piae et orthodoxae de sacramentis fidei (1556), which was an attempt to draw to his side the Philippists of Saxony and Lower Germany.

== Published works ==
As well as those named above, other works include, Explicatio Generalis Sententice quod e duobus Malis Minus Eligendum sit (1549), Lipsensem Basilium. ... (1549), Der rechte ungefelschte Glaub von dem Hochwirdigen Sacrament des waren Leybs und bluts unsers Herrn Jesu Christi (1554), and Annotationes In Iohannis Stosselii Modum Agendi, Et Brevis Confutatio Calumniarum (1586).

Other works of Westphal occasioned by the controversy on the Lord’s Supper are: Epistola Joachimi Westphali, qua breviter respondet ad convicia J. Calvini (1557); Confessio fidei de eucharistiae sacramento, in qua ministri ecclesiarum Saxoniae...astruunt corporis et sanguinis D. n. J. Christi praesentiam in coena sancta, et de libro Calvini ipsis dedicato respondent (Magdeburg, 1557); Justa defensio adversus insignia mendacia J. a Lasco, quae in epistola ad Poloniae regem contra Saxonicas ecclesias sparsit (1557); Apologetica scripta Johannis Westphali, quibus et sanam doctrinam de eucharistia defendit et foedissimas calumnias sacramentariorum diluit (1558), and Confutatio aliquot enormium mendaciorum Johannis Calvini (1558).

In 1558 he published Apologia confessionis de Coena Domini. This book contains a chapter "De adoratione Christi in Eucharistia", where he defends elevation and use of bell during consecration.

Joachim Westphal Born: 1510 or 1511 in Hamburg Died: 16 January 1574 in Hamburg
Titles in Lutheranism
Vacant Title last held by Paul von Eitzen	Superintendent of Hamburg for the Lutheran State Church serving per pro already since 1562; 1571–1574	Succeeded by Cyriacus Simon
