= Gnesio-Lutherans =

Theological party in the Lutheran churches

Gnesio-Lutherans (from Greek γνήσιος gnesios "genuine, authentic") is a modern name for a theological party in the Lutheran churches, in opposition to the Philippists after the death of Martin Luther and before the Formula of Concord. In their own day, they were called Flacians by their opponents and simply Lutherans by themselves. Later, Flacian became to mean an adherent of Matthias Flacius' view of original sin, rejected by the Formula of Concord. In a broader meaning, the term Gnesio-Lutheran is associated mostly with the defence of the doctrine of Real Presence, along with the practice Eucharistic adoration.

== Locations ==
The centres of Gnesio-Lutherans were Magdeburg and the University of Jena.

== Notable proponents ==
Other notable Gnesio-Lutherans include Caspar Aquila, Joachim Westphal, Johann Wigand, Matthäus Judex, Joachim Mörlin, Erasmus Sarcerius, and Aegidius Hunnius.

== Controversies ==
After the death of Martin Luther, several theological controversies arose among Lutherans due mostly to the teachings of Philip Melanchthon. Gnesio-Lutherans were profiled by defending Martin Luther's doctrine, led initially by Matthias Flacius. The Gnesio-Lutherans exercised strict doctrinal discipline, but they also opposed with equal determination what they considered to be the errors of their fellow combatants, such as von Amsdorf (Amsdorfians), Flacius (Flacians), Andreas Poach, and others.

Gnesio-Lutherans were involved in:

- The Adiaphoristic controversy.
- The Majoristic controversy (Nicolaus von Amsdorf, Nicolaus Gallus).
- The second Antinomian controversy (Andreas Poach, Anton Otto).
- The Synergistic controversy (Matthias Flacius, Nicolaus Gallus).
- The Osiandrian controversy .
- The Crypto-Calvinistic controversy.

The Crypto-Calvinistic controversy was the largest of the controversies of the second generation of the Lutheran Reformation. Since it was far more fundamental to the Lutheran Church, Lutherans outside of the Flacian party took the Gnesio-Lutheran position against Philippism and Crypto-Calvinism. In the middle between the Philippists and the Gnesio-Lutherans, the Centrist Party included Johannes Brenz, Jakob Andreae, Martin Chemnitz, Nikolaus Selnecker, David Chytraeus, Andreas Musculus, and others.

Unlike the Gnesio-Lutherans, members of the centre party were opposed to any unnecessary controversies involving no doctrinal differences, and careful not to fall into any extreme position themselves. The Gnesio-Lutheran Joachim Westphal was the first to write to defend the Real Presence against the Calvinists, and Melanchthon stigmatized his and other Gnesio-Lutherans' doctrine as "bread worship". The Gnesio-Lutherans practice Eucharistic adoration, following Martin Luther's treatise titled The Adoration of the Sacrament, in which he defended the practice of Eucharistic adoration.
