= Matthäus Dresser =

German humanist (1536–1607)

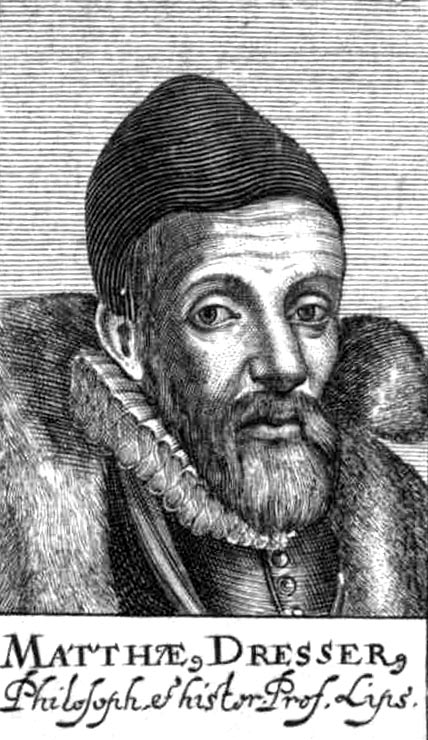
- 16th century depiction of Dresser
- Born: 24 August 1536; Erfurt, Saxony, Germany
- Died: 18 November 1559 (aged 23); Magdeburg, Thuringia, Germany
- Occupation: Professor
- Spouse(s): Juliana Sarcerius, Maria Cordes

Matthäus Dresser (also spelled: Matteaus, Matthaei; Dressler, Drescher, Dresserus, Dresseri; August 24, 1536 – October 5, 1607) was a Lutheran German humanist, pedagogue, philosopher, and historian.

== Education and career ==
Dresser attended school in Erfurt and Eisleben, and later studied at the University or Erfurt, where he attended lectures by Martin Seidemann. In Erfurt, records of him go back to 1559, where he earned a Masters of Philosophy. In 1560, he learned Biblical Hebrew during his university studies. When the Protestant Council Grammar School of Erfurt began construction in 1561, Dresser participated in the founding of the University, where he became a professor of Greek Literature. He aspired to attend the University of Wittenberg, but was unable to do so due to illness at the time.

In 1575, Dresser became the rector of the Electoral Provincial School of St. Afra school in Meissen. After six years of tenure, he became a professor of Greco-Roman liturgy and history at the University of Leipzig. There, he was appointed dean of the philosophy school, and was the rector of alma mater in 1599. Dresser translated several works of Latin into German, such as Prophyry's Isagoge. He later became the electoral historiographer of Saxony.

== Personal life ==
Dresser was married twice in his life. His first marriage was to Juliana Sarcerius, daughter of Lutheran theologian and disciple Erasmus Sarcerius. He was, by that relation, brother in law to Zacharias Praetorius. After the death of Juliana, Dresser married Maria Cordes, the daughter of the prepositus at Leipzig University, M. Henricus Cordes. He did not produce progeny in either marriage. Dresser died of Malaria on October 7, 1607, and was buried at the Paulinerkirche.

== Selected bibliography ==
- Oratio isocratis Rhetoris Atheniensis disertissimi, eleganter disserens de officio Magistratus erga subditos et subditorum erga Magistratur etc., conversa e Graeco in Latinum (1558)
- Rhetorica, inventionis, dispositionis et elocutionis illustrata et locuplctata quam plurimis exemplis sacris et philosophicis (1570)
- M. T. Ciceronis de Natura Deorum libri III cum argumentis, oeconomia, et rerum verborumque accur. et artif. enodatione; additae sunt ad finem cujusque libri disputatione etc. (1572)
- Dresser, Matthaeus (1574). Gymnasmatum linguae graecae libri III orationum, epistolarum et carminum exempla sacra et profana complectentes (in Latin). Andreas Schneider.
- Dresser, Matthaeus (1577). De disciplina nova et veteri tam domestica quam scholastica (in Latin). Ex Officina Oporiniana.
- Dresser, Matthaus (1580). Elocutionis rhetoricae doctrina, praeceptis et exemplis, cum sacris, tum philosophicis, exposita et locupletata: ut ad intelligendum et formandum orationem conducat (in Latin).
- Matthaeus Dresser (1580). Oratio de dialectica Philippi Melanchthonis. Bavarian State Library. Vögelin.
- Catechismus Parvus D. Martini Lutheri, cum scholis et nonnullis textibus biblicis de festis anni, Item precationibus scholasticis (1581)
- Dresser, Matthaeus (1581). Oratio de IV monarchiis sive summis imperiis a Daniele propheta expressis (in Latin). Joh. Beyer.
- Matthaeus Dresser (1584). De Festis Diebvs Christianorvm, Ivdaeorvm, Et Ethnicorum Liber Quo origo, caussa, ritus& vsus earum exponitur (in German). Apelius.
- Dresser, Matthaeus (1584). Querela de Pontificiis insidiis per Germaniam: item: Carmen de Laniena Antverpiae tentata (in Latin).
- De ordine et progressu professionis suac Lipsiensis (1585)
- Matthaeus Dresser (1586). isagoge historica: De politica dignitate & potestate Germanorum Particula (in Latin). unknown library. Lantzenberger.
- Dresser, Matthaeus (1587). Orationes Matthaei Dresseri: Tam Rerum Varietate Et copia quam sermonis puritate & elegantia commendatae (in Latin).
- Orationes duae de Dialectica Phil. Melanthonis (1588)
- Narratio de statu Ecclcsiae et Religionis in Persico regno (1589)
- Confutatio commentitiae opinionis Rob. Bellamini de translatioie Imp. Rom. a Graecis ad Romanos, institutioneque septemvirorum electoralium per Pontif. (1592)
- De Christiano inclyto et magnanimo duce electore: Oratio funebris habita en academia (1592)
- Oratio De vita et morte D. Pauli Lutheri Medici (1593)
- Explicatio ad Rudolphum II. Imp. Rom. historica dicti seu vaticinii cujusdam Lactantii de delendo noraine Romano in terris et transferendo imperio occid. in orientem (1593)
- Oratio De Bello Turcico: ex rationibus et historiis depromta, et ad acuendos Christianos hoc tempore accommodata (1593)
- Oratio De cancellarii munere et dignitate tam in regnis et ducatibus, quam in Academia Lipsiensi (1594)
- Die kleine fürstliche Chronica, durch Kasper Sturm, contin. bis aufs Jahr Chr. 1596 (1596)
- Sächsisches Chronicon (1596)
- Historien und Bericht von dem neuerlicher Zeit erfundenen Königreiche China (1597)
- Martini Lutheri Historia (1598)
- Gratulatio de recuperata Alba rcgali. Leipzig (1600)
- Actus solennis commendationis, seu renunciationis Rectoris magnificentissimi in Academia Lipsica (1602)
- Neu Stammbuch und Beschreibung des uralten königlichen Kur- und fürstlichen Geschlechtes des Hauses Sachsen u.s.w. (1602)
- Ungnadische Chronica, darinnen der Herren Ungnaden Ankunft und Ausbreitung und ritterliche Thaten verzeichnet werden von 1147 (1601)
- De praecipuis Germaniae urbibus paene ducentis, Isagoges histoncae Pars V (1606)
- Orationes in unum eorpus redactae (1606)
- De discendi Ordine Consilium (1611)
