= Ludwig Rabus =

Ludwig Rabus (also Rab or Günzer) (10 October 1523 – 22 July 1592) was a German Lutheran theologian and Protestant reformer.

== Life ==
He was born in Memmingen, in poor circumstances. He went to Strasbourg, where he was supported by the preacher Matthäus Zell and his wife Katharina. In 1538, Rabus became a student at University of Tübingen, and graduated M.A. in 1543.

In the years following, Rabus became Zell's assistant, established a reputation as a preacher, and in 1548 became Zell's successor. The Augsburg Interim meant that he lost his post, but he remained in Strasbourg. In 1552, he became head of the Collegium Wilhelmitanum and teacher at the High School. In 1553, together with Jacob Andreae, he was awarded a Tübingen doctorate.

When the Strasbourg council favoured Johannes Marbach, Rabus left the city, where he was regarded as something of a fanatic, and went to Ulm, where he worked for 34 years as minister and dean. In the controversy around Kaspar Schwenckfeld he wrote against Katharina Zell, who defended herself, and what had been a long-running private disagreement about her husband's legacy became a public quarrel.

In Ulm, Rabus standardised teaching, held inspections, introduced liturgical books, and supported Andreae in his efforts towards the Swabian Concord. He died there.

== Works ==
Rabus began to work on a selective Protestant martyrology in the late 1540s, as the Interim began to affect churches in his region. A Latin version appeared in 1552.

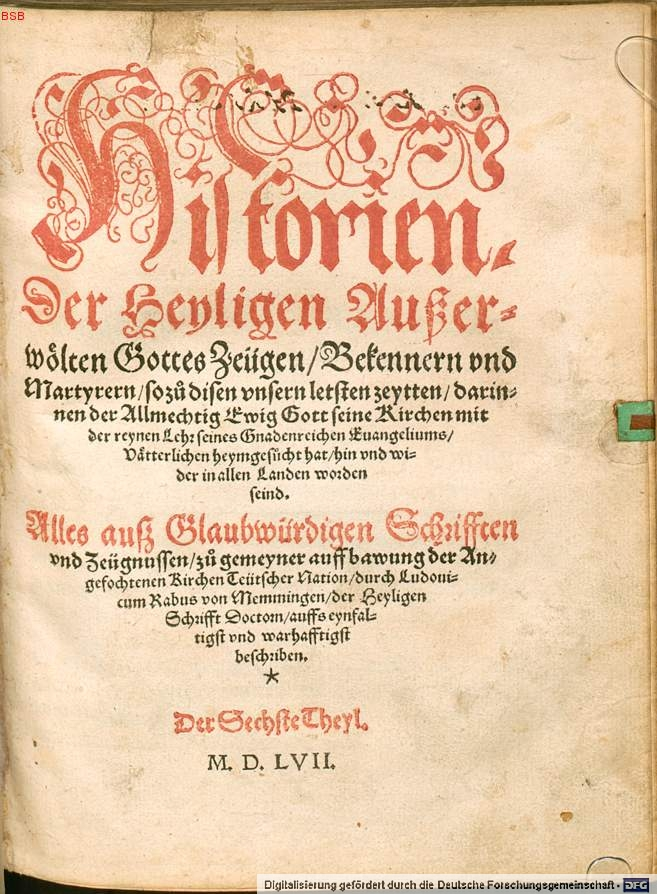
Title page of the final volume 6 of Historien der Heyligen, 1557.

The German Historien der Heyligen appeared in six volumes (completed 1557), published at Strasbourg by Samuel Emmel. It is framed as a universal history. The first volume begins with Abel and discusses biblical stories and martyrs of the Early Christian Church; it uses Eusebius of Caesarea as a source. In the following five books around 70 martyrologies are given. He dedicated his book of martyrology to Christoph, Duke of Württemberg and the Strasbourg council.
