= Mertendorf =

- Municipality
- Location of Mertendorf within Burgenlandkreis district
- Interactive map of Mertendorf
- Location within Germany Location within Saxony-Anhalt
- Coordinates: 51°7′N 11°51′E
- Country: Germany
- State: Saxony-Anhalt
- District: Burgenlandkreis
- Municipal assoc.: Wethautal
- Subdivisions: 13

Government
  - Mayor (2023–30): Hartmut Friedland

Area
  - Total: 32.51 km^{2} (12.55 sq mi)
- Elevation: 165 m (541 ft)

Population (2025-12-31)
  - Total: 1,534
  - Density: 47.19/km^{2} (122.2/sq mi)
- Time zone: UTC+01:00 (CET)
  - Summer (DST): UTC+02:00 (CEST)
- Postal codes: 06618
- Dialling codes: 03445, 034422
- Vehicle registration: BLK
- Website: www.vgem-wethautal.de

Mertendorf (German pronunciation: [ˈmɛʁtn̩dɔʁf]) is a municipality in the Burgenlandkreis district, in Saxony-Anhalt, Germany. On 1 January 2010 it absorbed the former municipalities Görschen and Löbitz (including Utenbach, absorbed on 31 December 2009). The municipality consists of the following Ortsteile (villages):

- Cauerwitz
- Droitzen
- Görschen
- Großgestewitz
- Löbitz
- Mertendorf
- Pauscha
- Punkewitz
- Rathewitz
- Scheiplitz
- Seiselitz
- Utenbach
- Wetterscheidt
