= Erasmus Sarcerius =

German protestant thinker (1501–1559)

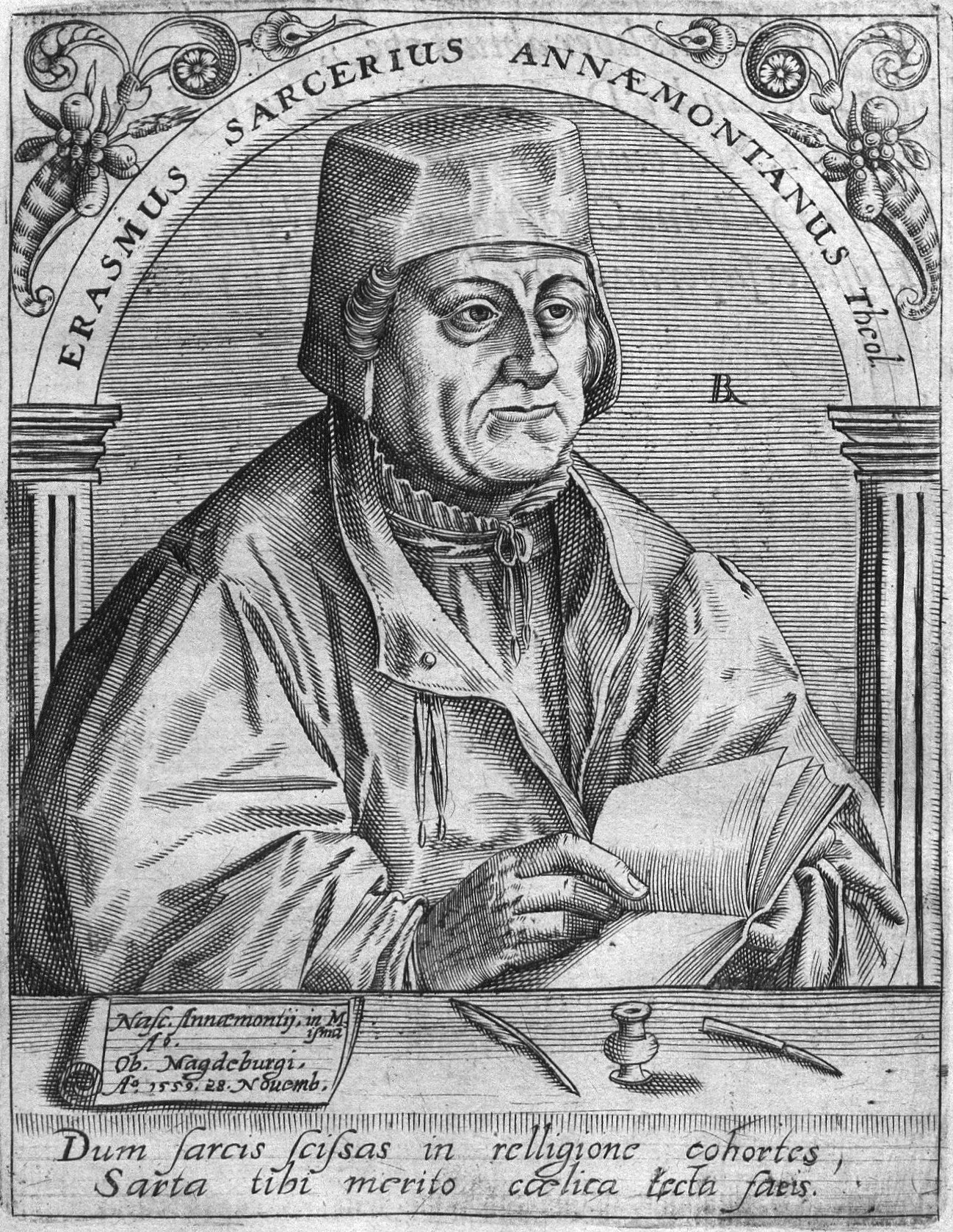
- 16th-century copper engraving of Erasmus Sarcerius from the Protestant Seminary Library of Lutherstadt Wittenberg
- Born: 19 April 1501; Annaberg, Electorate of Saxony, Holy Roman Empire
- Died: 18 November 1559 (aged 58); Magdeburg, Electorate of Saxony, Holy Roman Empire
- Occupation: Theologian
- Spouse: Christine
- Children: Wilhelm, Juliana, Magdalena, Judith, Maria

Erasmus Sarcerius (19 April 1501 in Annaberg – 18 November 1559 in Magdeburg) was a German Protestant Gnesio-Lutheran theologian and reformer. He was the father of Lutheran philosopher Wilhelm Sarcerius.

== Life ==
Sarcerius was the son of a burgher who became wealthy through metal trading in the Annaberg town mines. He is said to have gone to school in Freiberg with Friedrich Myconius and attended the University of Leipzig. After the death of his humanist teacher, Petrus Mosellanus, he moved to Wittenberg in 1524 and worked with fellow Lutheran reformers Martin Luther and Philipp Melanchthon. Later in his life, he worked at Protestant theology schools in Austria and Rostock. Between 1531 and 1536, he worked as the first subrector at Katharineum, a Latin humanist school in Lübeck. He was said to have been close to the rector, Hermann Bonnus, who would become the later superintendent at Lübeck. By the time that he became a teacher, he had already rose to prominence through his writings on Protestantism.

In 1536, he was appointed rector of the Latin school in Siegen, and in the following year was appointed superintendent of the state by Count William I of Nassau-Siegen for the purpose of reorganizing the church. In his liturgical career, Sarcerius published copies of his sermons, and wrote Lutheran catechisms, such as his dogmatic treatise Methodus divinae scripturae locos praecipuos explicans (A method of explaining the main passages of the divine scriptures) in 1539.

He served as a preacher in Andernach during the attempted Reformation of Archbishop Hermann of Wied and in 1545 in the Babenhausen municipality (now Babenhausen, Hesse), which belonged to the county of Hanau-Lichtenberg. While he was working in Nassau, Sarcerius received a request to work as professor to Lutheran students in Leipzig, but Count William I requested that he did not leave his current position.

After the Augsburg Interim, the count was not able to keep Sarcerius on tenure. Sarcerius hoped to move back to Lübeck or Rostock, but decided to take the pastorate at St. Thomas in Leipzig. Through his activities in West Germany, as well as in his native Saxony, Sarcerius acquired large influence in ecclesiastical circles. Contemporaries considered him a significant figure and treated him with great respect.

In 1552, Sarcerius, Melanchthon, and Valentin Paraus were chosen to present the Saxon Confession, an alteration of the Augsburg Confession, at the Council of Trent. It is said that Duke Maurice of Saxony's activity during the Second Schmalkaldic War prevented them from doing so.

From Leipzig, Sarcerius was appointed superintendent to Mansfeld, where he worked as a visitator and organizer. He laid the groundwork for this in his writing Form und Weise einer Visitation für die Graf - und Herrschaft Mansfeld (Form and Manner of a Visitation for the County and Lordship of Mansfeld) in 1554. As a theologian with very strict Lutheran beliefs, he did not have an easy time conducting work due to the resistance of Georg Major's supporters, who had theological differences with Sarcerius. The popular attitude of the community eventually alienated Sarcerius completely from his former teacher Melanchthon, whom he later encountered once more at the Colloquy of Worms in 1557, which he attended with Erhard Schnepf, Victorinus Strigel, Johann Stössel, and one of the Mörlins by order of the dukes of Saxony.

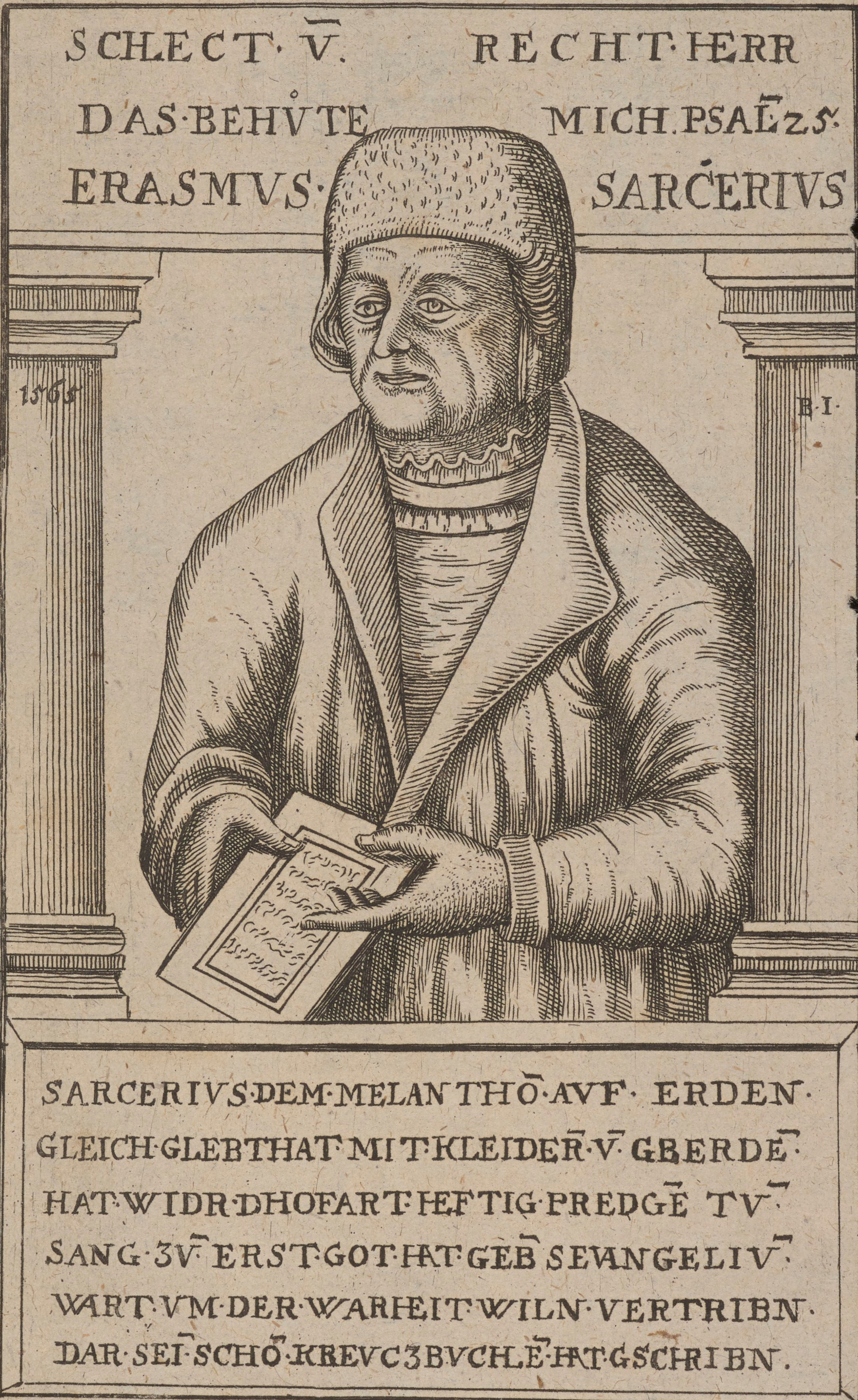
Engraving of Erasmus Sarcerius from 1565

Sarcerius was praised by his contemporaries as a pious and theologically well-read man who took a stand on disputes between Protestant divisions, although he was heavily influenced by the thinking of Martin Luther.

Sarcerius is also credited with being the first systematic theology in the United Kingdom, with an English translation by Richard Taverner of "The Common Places" by Sarcerius in 1538. The accomplishment is notable, due to no works like that of Sarcerius being published in his native German at the time. The translation, a dedication to Henry VIII, was ordered by the then-chief minister Thomas Cromwell, only a couple of years before his execution.

== Family ==
Eramus, with his wife Christine, had a son Wilhelm, who held a preaching position at St. Andrew's Church, as well as daughters: Juliana, Magdalene, and Judith. His wife gave birth to a total of 11 children, many of whom died in infancy. They stayed in Siegen until 1549, until Wilhelm, Christine, and Juliana left Seigen for Leipzig to meet with their father in 1549 after religious persecution. Wilhelm later enrolled in the Bavarian Hohe Schule in 1554. In 1556, Wilhelm began as a court preacher at Eisleben with fellow Lutheran Hans Georg von Vorderort after being accused of Flacian error. He also accepted a position of preacher in the St Andreas church in 1560. A year prior, Erasmus had died from kidney stones. In 1568 he became a pastor at St. Peter's church. He died in 1582 in Altkirchen after being appointed superintendent of Styne county. Christine died in March 1552, dying during the stillbirth of her unborn son. Juliana went on to marry historian Matthew Dresser in 1566. She died childless in 1598, but before her death, she and Matthias raised the children of her sister Judith, who orphaned her children. Their final living daughter, Magdalene, married Zacharias Praetorius on 21 Aug 1559 and died in Eisleben in 1560.

=== Erasmus Sarcerius Family Tree ===
		Christine ?-1552	Erasmus Sarcerius; 1501-1559
Wilhelm Sarcerius; Aft. 1536-1582	Juliana Sarcerius; 1547-1598	Matthäus Dresser; 1536-1607	Magdalene Sarcerius ?-1560	Zacharias Breiter; 1535-1575	Judith Sarcerius ?-Bef. 1595	Maria Sarcerius

== Personal views ==
Sarcerius was an advocate of chastity. In 1554, he wrote: "We Germans nowadays can boast but little of the virtue of chastity, and that little [virtue] is disappearing so fast that we can hardly speak of it any more. The number who still love it are so small... Debauchery prevails without fear and without shame."

He also spoke out against the inappropriate use of Church funds that he witnessed in the city of Mansfeld, speaking on the under-the-table lending of money, unjustified project funding, and contributing to lavish lifestyles, rather than using tithes for their intended purpose. In 1555, he said, "The great Lords seek to appropriate to themselves the feudal rights and dues of the clergy and allow their officials and justices to take forcible action. The revenues of the Church are spent in making roads and bridges and giving banquets, and are lent from hand to hand without hypothecary security."

After Julius von Pflung commanded that Lutheran theologians at the Colloquy of Worms denounce Zwinglians, Osiandrists, Adiaphorists, and Synergists, Sarcerius got into a dispute with Melanchtohon, who did not want to denounce any religious sect before further debate.

Unlike Calvinists at the time, Sarcerius took a staunch position against predestination, and believed that the Scriptures refuted any theological claims of predestination. Sarcerius famously said, "Also here unto pertain such places as do promise a universal grace, whereby a man's conscience ought to lift itself up against such assaults as his reason makes of predestination, as this universal promise. 'God wills all men to be saved', 'God wills not the death of the sinner, but that he turn and do repentance', and 'Come unto me', said Christ, 'all ye that labor & are laden, and I shall refresh you.' Surely it is an extreme madness a man to vex his mind with unremunerative questions concerning predestination, whereas he may comfort himself with the promise of grace... to desire & receive mercy offered by the Gospel, to endure in faith to the final end."

== Bibliography ==
- Sarcerius, Erasmus (1539). Methodus divinae Scripturae locos praecipuos explicans [A method of explaining the main passages of the divine scriptures] (in Latin).
- Sarcerius, Erasmus (1536). Rhetorica, Plena ac Referta Exemplis Quae succinstarum Declamationnum loco esse possunt Iam rursum castigatius aedita [Rhetoric, full of sharp examples that can take the place of succinct declaration] (in Latin).
- Sarcerius, Erasmus (1536). De institutione scholae Sigensis [On the Institution of the School of Sigensis] (in Latin). ex officina Eucharij Ceruicorni Agrippinatis.
- Sarcerius, Erasmus (1538). Expositiones In Evangelia Festialia: ad methodi formam fere absolutae [Expositions in the Gospels Festialia: to the form of an almost absolute method] (in Latin). Egenolphus.
- Sarcerius, Erasmus (1538). Loci Aliquot Communes et Theologici, in amico quodam responso, ad Presulis cuiusdam orationem, in gratiam boni ac integri, pie nunc memoriae amici, pro ape rienda & tuenda ueritate, methodice explicati [Some Common and Theological Elements, in a kind answer to a friend, to a certain prayer of the Presuli, in favor of a good and wholesome friend, now of pious memory, for the truth to be laughed at and defended, methodically explained] (in Latin).

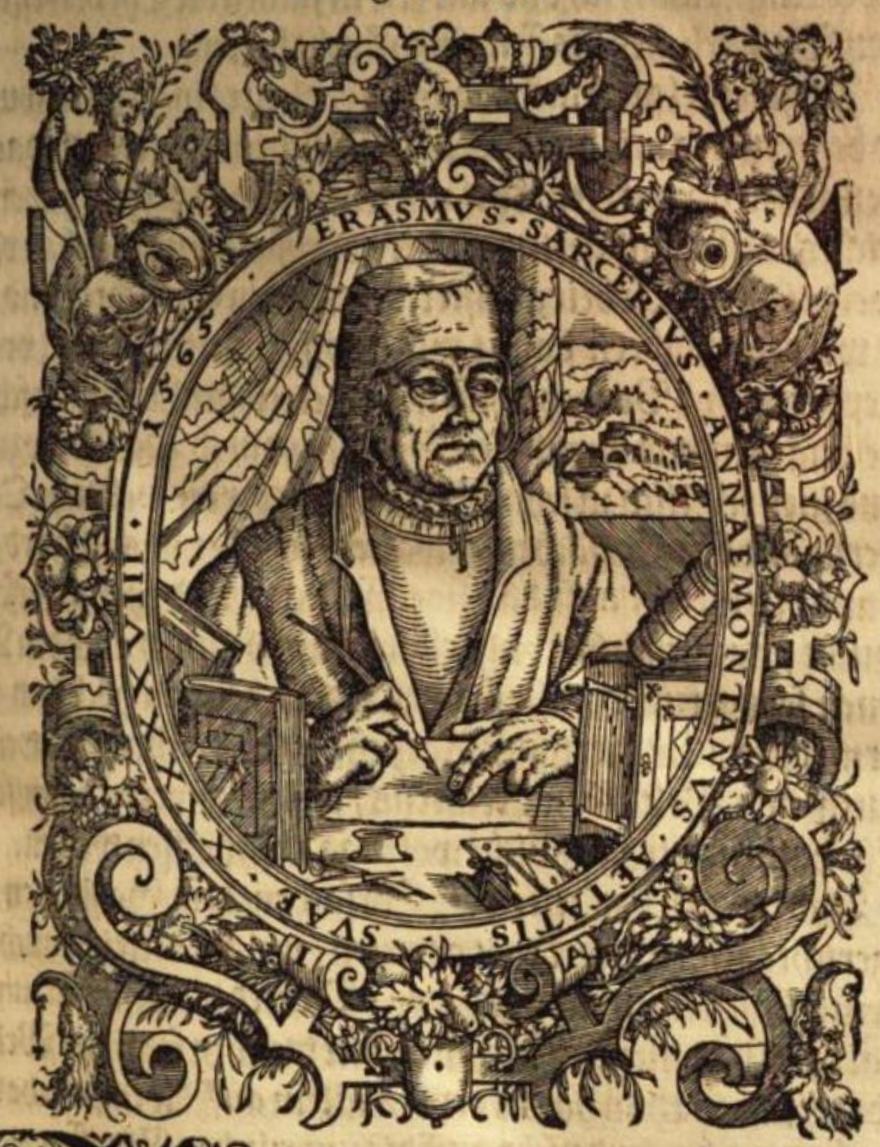
Imprint of Erasmus Sarcerius from Corpus juris matrimonialis in 1565

- Sarcerius, Erasmus (1539). Methodus Denuoiam Correcta Ac Purgata in praecipuos Scripturae diuinae locos, ad nuda didactici generis prae cepta, ingenti labore in Theolo gorum non exercitatorum usum coposita, quo certa rationesancta Scriptura syn cere tractare possint [The Method of Denuoiam: Corrected and integrated into the principal passages of the divine Scriptures, prepared for the didactic kind, put together with great labor for the use of untrained theologians, by which they can treat the Holy Scriptures with a certain rationality] (in Latin).
- Sarcerius, Erasmus (1539). Dialogus Mutuis Interrogationibus et Responsionibus reddens rationem ueteru synodorum, cum generalium, tum prouincialium: item uisitationum, & nuper habitae sunodi & uisitationis, prop Pastoribus Comitatus Nassouiensis, sub illusstri & generoso Domino Guilielmo Comite: simuliz explicans eiusdem synodi & uisitationis acta, que lecta & cognita, & alns regionibus multum utilitatis adferrepossunt [A Dialogue with Mutual Questions and Answers giving an account of former synods, both general and provincial: also of visits, and of the recently held synod and visitation, for the Pastors of the County of Nassau, under the illustrious and generous Lord William Comite: simultaneously explaining the proceedings of the same synod and visitation, which he read and learned, and could bring a great deal of benefit to other regions] (in Latin).
- Sarcerius, Erasmus (1539). In Evangelia Dominicalia, postilla in qua facili dispo sitione, omnium Euangeliorum textus, ad locos communes dispositus est, qui & singuli ad Methodi ferè formam explicati sunt, quo textus & facilius feruari possit, & pulchriori ordine explicari [In the Sunday Gospels, a postil in which the text of all the Gospels is arranged for easy arrangement, the text of all the Gospels is arranged in common places, which are each explained according to the Methodist form, so that the text can be read more easily and explained in a more beautiful order] (in Latin). Apud Chr. Egenolphum.
- Sarcerius, Erasmus (1539). Catechismus Per Omnes Qvaestiones & circustancias, quae in instamtrastalionem moidere possunt, in usum praedicatorum diligemer ac pie absolutus [Catechism encompassing all the questions and circumstances that can lead to the establishment, for the use of diligent and pious preachers] (in Latin). Christ. Egenolphus.
- Sarcerius, Erasmus (1540). In Mattheaum Evangelistam Iusta et docta scholia per omnes rhetoricae artis circunstantias methodice conscripta [In Matthew the Evangelist: Just and the learned teachings methodically wrote down: all the circumstances of the art of rhetoric] (in Latin). Bartholomaeus Westhemerus.
- Sarcerius, Erasmus (1541). Lucae evangelion cum iustis scholiis: per omnes circumstantias methodica forma conscriptum [The Gospel of Luke with the just teachings: written in a methodical form] (in Latin). Egenolphus.
- Sarcerius, Erasmus (1541). In epistolam ad Romanos scholia [Teachings in the Epistle to the Romans] (in Latin). Chr. Egenolphus.
- Sarcerius, Erasmus (1541). In Ioannem Evangelistam Ivsta Scholia [eachings of John the Evangelist] (in Latin). Westhemerus.
- Sarcerius, Erasmus (1543). Erasmi Sarcerii In Iesum Syrach integra scholia [Complete teachings of the Sirachs of Jesus] (in Latin).
- Sarcerius, Erasmus (1544). In D. Pauli Epistolas ad Corinthios eruditae ac piae meditationes [In the learned and pious meditation of Paul's Epistles to the Corinthians] (in Latin). Rihelius.
- Sarcerius, Erasmus (1544). Tumvs secundus methododi in praecipvos scripture divine locos in quo quinquaginta noui loci methodice trastantur qui in primo tomo non habenture [The second method of the divine scriptures, in which fifty-nine passages are methodically traced which were not in the first volume] (in Latin). Chr. Egenolphus.
- Sarcerius, Erasmus (1546). Dictionarium Scholasticae Doctrinae, in quo & horrendos abusus, & multaaliaad sacram scripturam recte intelligendam non inutilia, cernere licebit [A Dictionary of Scholastic Doctrine, in which both horrible corruptions and things useful for the correct understanding of the holy scriptures, may be seen] (in Latin). Isingrin.
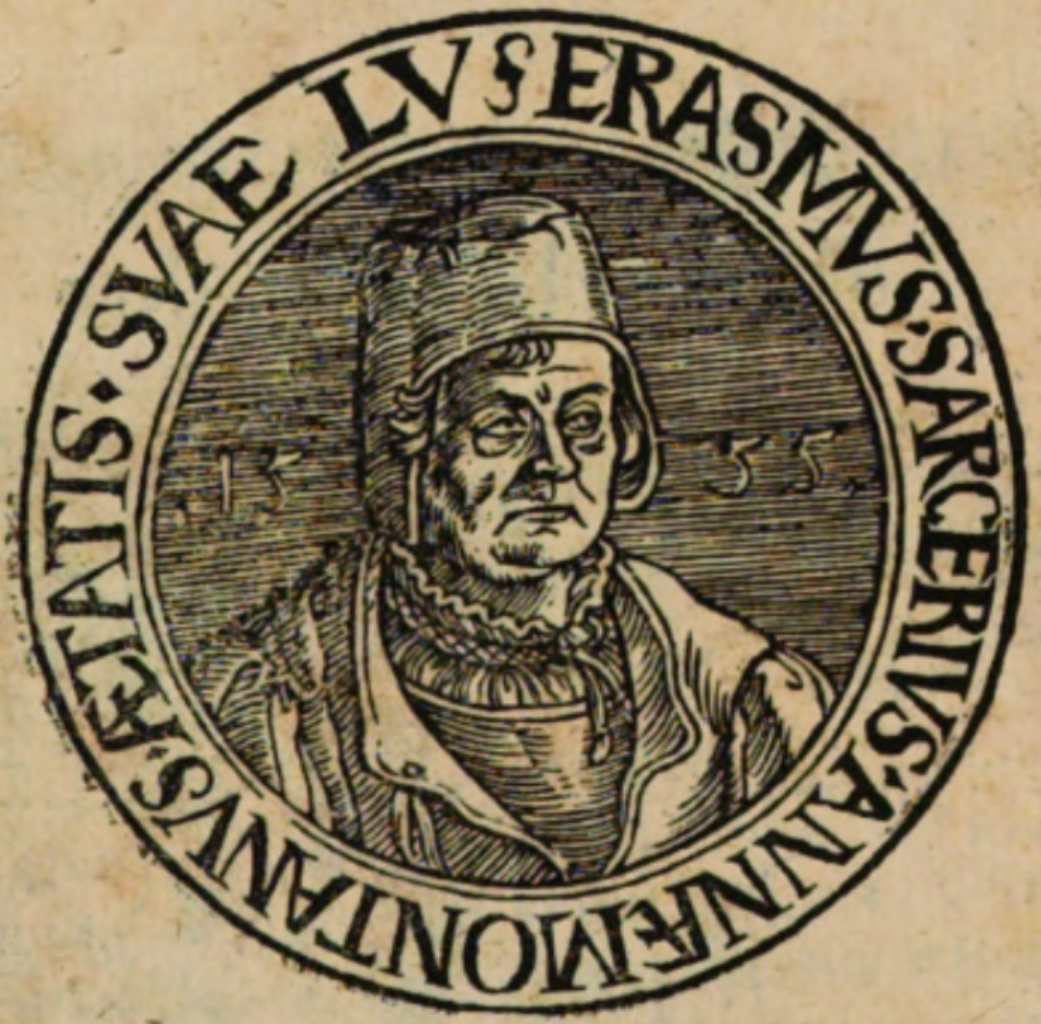
  1557 Imprint of Erasmus Sarcerius from Büchlein von der rechten
- Sarcerius, Erasmus (1546). Nova methodus in Praecipuos Scripturae Divinae Locos, Antea ea fide & illo ordine, necedita [A new method into the principal places of the Divine Scriptures, previously executed in that faith and in that order] (in Latin).
- Sarcerius, Erasmus (1548). Dialectica, multis ac variis exemplis illustrata, una cum facilima Syllogismorum, Expositoriorum, Enthymematum, Exemplorum, Inductionum, & Soritum dispositione [Dialectic, illustrated by many and various examples, together with an easy arrangement of Syllogisms, Expositories, Enthymemes, Examples, Inductions, and Sorites] (in Latin). Egenolphus.
- Sarcerius, Erasmus (1549). Creutzbüchlein: Darinnen vier und zwentzig Ursachen vermeldet werden, Warumb die reine lere des Evanges lu trewe prediger und frome Christen: one Creug und Leis den nicht sein mogen [Booklet of Creeds: Four and Twenty Causes Are Reported Therein, Why the Pure Truth of the Gospel Must Not Be for Faithful Preachers and Devout Christians: One Creed and One Silence] (in German). Rhau.
- Sarcerius, Erasmus (1550). Catechismus Erasmi Sacerii Plane novus, per omnes fere quaestiones et circumstancias [Catchisms of Erasmus Sacerius] (in Latin). Volphgangus Gunter.
- Sarcerius, Erasmus (1551). Zwei Predigten Grati Sarcerii: Eine Wider das Leuslische, ordentliche, und ethische leben, so man in der Fahnachts zeit treibet [Two Sermons by Grati Sarcerii: One Against the Religious, Orderly, and Ethical Life to be Practiced in the Time of the Fast] (in German). Bärwald.
- Sarcerius, Erasmus (1551). Einfeltige und Kurtze Summarien, Auslegung und Handlung über die herrliche und schöne Historie der frölichen Aufferstehung unsers lieben Herren Jhesu Christi [A Concise and Summary Interpretation and Account of the Glorious and Beautiful History of the Early Resurrection of Our Lord Jesus Christ] (in German). Günter.
- Sarcerius, Erasmus (1553). Ein Buch von heiligen Ehestande und von Ehestachen mit allen umbstenvigseiten zu die sen vingen gehorig varinnen zu gleich naturlich [A book of holy matrimony and of matrimonial matters with all the pertinence to those few belonging examples of the same nature] (in German). durch Jacobum Berwald.
- Sarcerius, Erasmus (1553). Eine Predigte, auf dem großen Landtage zu Leipzig gethan [First sermon delivered at the Great Diet of Leipzig] (in German).
- Sarcerius, Erasmus (1553). Die ander Predigt, auf dem großen Landtage zu Leipzig [The other sermon at the Great Diet of Leipzig] (in German).
- Sarcerius, Erasmus (1553). Die dritte Predigt auf dem großen Landtage zu Leipzig [hird Sermon at the Great Diet of Leipzig] (in German).
- Sarcerius, Erasmus (1553). Kurzer begriff Summarien Auslegung und Nandlung der historien des leidens und Sterbens unsers lieben Nerren Thesu Christi [Summaries of interpretation and treatment of the histories of the suffering and death of our dear Lord Jesus Christ] (in German).
- Sarcerius, Erasmus (1553). Hausbuch fur die einfeltigen haus ueter vonden vornemesten articteln der christlichen religion [Handbook for the simple house readers of the principle elements of the Christian religion] (in German).
- Sarcerius, Erasmus (1554). Einer Christlichen Ordination, form und weise, und vas dazu gehörig [A Christian Ordination: Form and manner and what belongs to it] (in German). Gaubisch.
- Sarcerius, Erasmus (1554). Ein Trostschrifft an einen goblichen und Christlichen Graffen welchem sein Lande und Leuce von seinen eclichen eigenen Kindern (das denn schrectlicht zu horen) vorbehalcen weden wider alle Naturliche liebe und billigleit von wegen der reinen lere unsers lieben Nerrn Jhesu Christi [A letter of consolation to a noble and Christian count, to whom his country and his life are reserved by his own children (which is then to be heard as a matter of course) against all natural love and fairness on account of the pure soul of our dear Lord Jesus Christ] (in German).
- Sarcerius, Erasmus (1555). Ein Buchlein, von dem Banne, und andern Kirchentraffern: Aus Gottes Wort Aus Apostolicose [A booklet about the ban and other church tracts: From God's Word From the Apostolics] (in German). Urbanus Kaubitsch.
- Sarcerius, Erasmus (1555). Von Einer Disciplin, dadurch zucht, tugend und ebarkeit mugen gepflantzt und erhalten merden, Und den offentlichen Gunden Schanden und lastern ein abbruch geschehen [A discipline by which cultivation, purity, and virtue can be planted and preserved, and the public wickedness and vice can be aborted] (in German).
- Sarcerius, Erasmus (1555). Eine leichpredigte uber der Leiche des Gestrengen und ehrnuesten [A sermon over the corpse of the most gracious and venerable] (in German). Gaubisch.
- Sarcerius, Erasmus (1556). Vorschlag einer Kirchengemeinde [Proposal of a Church Congregation, trial book-] (in German).
- Sarcerius, Erasmus (1556). Wahrhafftiger und weitleufftiger bericht aus Gotteswort und der eltesten Ueter schrifften das der Bapisten furnemester grundt in diesem Buche [True and far-reaching account from God's word and the oldest ancient writings that the bapists furnished foundation in this book] (in German).
- Sarcerius, Erasmus (1557). Büchlein, von der rechten vnd waren Bekentnis der Warheit, Einer ansehelichen Person zu Trost geschrieben [Booklet of the Right and True: Confession of the Truth Inscribed on the Foundation of a Wicked Person] (in German). Urbann Kaubitsch.
- Sarcerius, Erasmus (1565). Pastorale oder Hirtenbuch: Darinn das gantz Ampt aller trewer Pastorn, Lehrer unnd Diener der christlichen Kirchen [Shepherd's Book: Complete instructions to practice the profession of teacher, servant or pastor of the church] (in German).
- Sarcerius, Erasmus (1569). Corpus juris matrimonialis [Body of matrimoneal law] (in German). Feyerabend.
