= Johann Bernhard =

Johann Bernhard is a German given name. Notable people with the given name include:

- Johann Bernhard Aloys von Gudden (1824–1886), German neuroanatomist and psychiatrist
- Johann Bernhard Staudt (1654–1712), Austrian Jesuit composer
- Johann Bernhard Bach (1676–1749), German composer
- Johann Bernhard Bach the Younger (1700–1743), German composer and organist
- Johann Bernhard Basedow (1724–1790), German educational reformer, teacher, and writer
- Johann Bernhard Fischer (1685–1772), German medical doctor
- Johann Bernhard Fischer von Erlach (1656–1723), Austrian architect, sculptor, and engraver
- Johann Bernhard Logier (1777–1846), German composer, teacher, inventor, and publisher
- Johann Bernhard Merian (1723–1807), Swiss philosopher
- Johann Bernhard Stallo (1823–1900), German-American academic, jurist, philosopher, and ambassador
- Johann Bernhard Vermehren (1777–1803), an early Romantic poet and scholar
- Johann Bernhard von Rechberg und Rothenlöwen (1806–1899), Austrian statesman
- Johann Bernhard Wilbrand (1779–1846), German anatomist and naturalist
- Johann Bernhard Wilhelm Lindenberg (1781–1851), German bryologist
