= Andreas Poach =

Andreas Poach (c.1515 – April 2, 1585) was a German Lutheran theologian and Reformer.

Poach was born in Eilenburg. In 1530 he was admitted to the University of Wittenberg. In 1538, he obtained his Master's and remained until 1541 at the University of Wittenberg. He was an editor of Luther's Table Talk, deacon at Halle, Saxony-Anhalt, archdeacon at Jena, pastor at Nordhausen, Erfurt, and Utenbach, and professor at Erfurt.

During the Second Antinomian Controversy, he took the Philippist position that since salvation is not through the law, the working of the law is not necessary in conversion; the Gospel alone being sufficient. The Gnesio-Lutherans considered him to be an antinomian because of this viewpoint. Ultimately, his views were rejected in the Formula of Concord in the fifth article, On the Law and the Gospel and in the sixth article, On the Third Use of the Law. He died in Utenbach.

== Works ==
- Vom Christlichen Abschied aus diesem sterblichen Leben des lieben thewren Mannes Mathei Ratzenbergers der Artzney Doctors. Bericht durch A.P. Pfarherrn zun Augustinern in Erffurdt vnd andere So dabey gewesen kurtz zusammen gezogen. Jena 1559
- Eine Predigt aus dem Propheten Hosea/Cap. 4. Vber der Leiche M. Georgij Silberschlags Neunpredigers vnd Pfarrers zu Kauffmanskirche vnd Hebraice linguae publici Professoris in der Vniuersitet zu Erffurdt gethan Durch A.P. Pfarrer zun Augustinern am Fastnacht Sontag welcher war 17. Februarij A.D. 1572. Mühlhausen 1572
- Bekentniß vnd Grund der Lere vom Heiligen Hochwirdigen Sacrament des Leibs vnd bluts unsers Herren Jesu Christi aus Apostolischer Schrifft und Lutherischen Büchern zusammen bracht Durch A.P.Exulem. Zu dieser zeit nötig vnd Nützlich zulesen vnd zuwissen. Mülhausen 1572
- Vier Predigten von der Todten aufferstehung und letzten Posaunen Gottes Aus dem 15. Capitel der 1. Epistel S. Pauli an die Corinther Geprediget von dem Ehrwürdigen Herrn und thewren Man Gottes, D. Martin Luther zu Wittenberg Anno 1544 u. 45
- Vor nie in Druck ausgegangen Und jetzt neulich aus M. Georgen Rörers geschriebenen Büchern zusamen bracht Durch A.P. Erfurt 1574
