= Löbitz =

- Ortsteil of Mertendorf
- Interactive map of Löbitz
- Location within Germany Location within Saxony-Anhalt
- Coordinates: 51°05′N 11°53′E
- Country: Germany
- State: Saxony-Anhalt
- District: Burgenlandkreis
- Municipality: Mertendorf

Area
  - Total: 11.09 km^{2} (4.28 sq mi)
- Elevation: 209 m (686 ft)

Population (2006-12-31)
  - Total: 447
  - Density: 40.3/km^{2} (104/sq mi)
- Time zone: UTC+01:00 (CET)
  - Summer (DST): UTC+02:00 (CEST)
- Postal codes: 06618
- Dialling codes: 034422
- Website: www.vgem-wethautal.de

Löbitz (German pronunciation: [ˈløːbɪts]) is a village and a former municipality in the Burgenlandkreis district, in Saxony-Anhalt, Germany.

Since 1 January 2010, it has been a part of the municipality Mertendorf.
