= Görschen =

- Ortsteil of Mertendorf
- Interactive map of Görschen
- Location within Germany Location within Saxony-Anhalt
- Coordinates: 51°7′N 11°54′E
- Country: Germany
- State: Saxony-Anhalt
- District: Burgenlandkreis
- Municipality: Mertendorf

Area
  - Total: 9.36 km^{2} (3.61 sq mi)
- Elevation: 220 m (720 ft)

Population (2006-12-31)
  - Total: 527
  - Density: 56.3/km^{2} (146/sq mi)
- Time zone: UTC+01:00 (CET)
  - Summer (DST): UTC+02:00 (CEST)
- Postal codes: 06618
- Dialling codes: 034445
- Website: www.vgem-wethautal.de

Görschen is a village and a former municipality in the Burgenlandkreis district, in Saxony-Anhalt, Germany.

Since 1 January 2010, it is part of the municipality Mertendorf.
