= Arrhabonarii =

Polish Christian sect

The Arrhabonarii were a Polish Christian sect who held that the Eucharist was not a present gift of grace but was a pledge of a gift to be bestowed in heaven. The sect's name is derived from the Greek Ἀρραβων, Arrha, meaning "earnest". The position was first argued by Francesco Stancaro in 1543.
