= Stanisław Orzechowski =

Polish-Ruthenian political writer

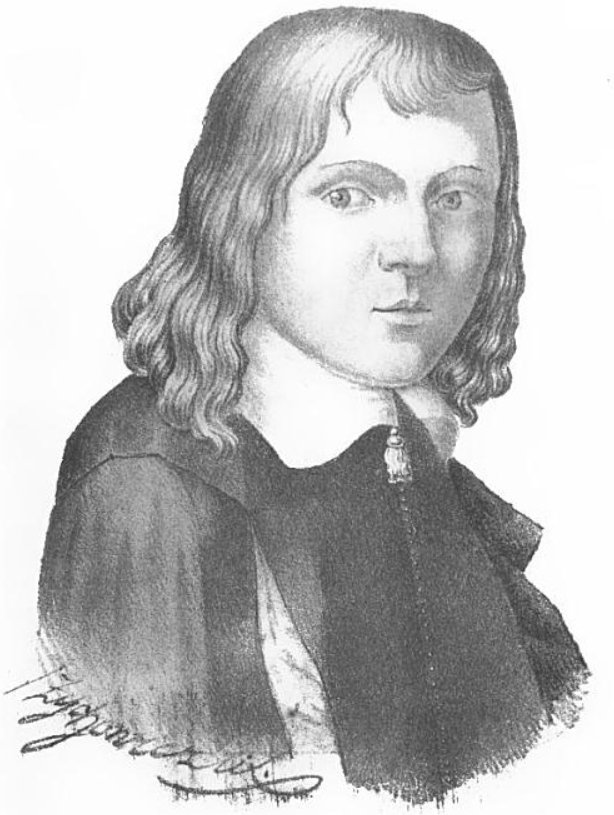
Stanisław Orzechowski

Stanisław Orzechowski (Note: also known among others as Stanisław Orżechowski Roxolan, Stanislaus Orichovius Polonus, Stanislaus Orichovius Ruthenus, Stanislaus Okszyc Orzechowski Roxolanus, Stanislas Orzechowski and Stanislaus Orzechowski.) (1513–1566) was a Polish-Ruthenian political writer. The son of a Catholic father and a Ruthenian Orthodox mother, he was a strict Roman Catholic for much of his life but at one stage, probably the 1540s, he appeared to have turned to Protestantism, which he later detracted from. He was highly critical of Protestant reformer Francesco Stancaro and authored a critique of him in around 1550, by which time he had turned his back on the Protestants. He is considered to be an early champion of Polish nationalism and in his writings often defended the Golden Liberty and privileges of the Polish nobility.

== Biography ==
Orzechowski was born in 1513, in or near Przemyśl, then part of the Ruthenian Voivodeship. His father, Stanisław Orzechowski, was a Catholic nobleman and courtier at the court of King John I Albert. Later Stanisław Orzechowski became a clerk of the Przemyśl Land. His mother was a Ruthenian noblewoman, Yadviga Baranetska, a daughter of an Orthodox priest. According to some researchers, he could have had up to 12 siblings.

He received his primary education at the cathedral school in Przemysl, where he received "the beginnings of writing and all sorts of sciences appropriate to the boyish years", and demonstrated "quick wit and good memory".

In 1526 he continued his education at the University of Kraków (a document shows the date of 5 August 1526). Dissatisfied with the scholasticism that prevailed there, he devoted much time to private study. He then studied in Vienna (1527), where his mentor was a renowned humanist and poet, Professor at the University of Vienna Alexander Brasikan.

In 1529 he moved to study at the University of Wittenberg. There he came under the influence of the Church reformer Martin Luther and fellow humanist Philip Melanchthon. His father, not wanting him to convert to the Protestant rite, soon enough ordered him to leave Wittenberg.

Subsequently, Stanisław went to Italy. There he attended lectures at University of Padua (1532) and the University of Bologna (1540), furthering his education in Rome and Venice.
