= Francesco Stancaro =

Italian Protestant reformer (1501–1574)

Francesco Stancaro (also Latin: Franciscus Stancarus) (1501 in Mantua – 1574 in Stopnica) was an Italian Catholic priest, theologian, Protestant convert, and Protestant reformer who became professor of Hebrew at the University of Königsberg.

A scholar in theology and Lutheranism, conciliarist, and a trained physician, he was an opponent of antitrinitarianism, but his views on Christ's mediatorship were actually used by antitrinitarians to popularize their views in Poland and Hungary. His teachings never achieved widespread credibility amongst Calvinists, but he received a considerable following, particularly amongst the Polish and Hungarian aristocracy, and is considered one of the most successful Reformists in Poland. He was imprisoned on numerous occasions and much of his life was spent as an itinerant theologian, traveling extensively across eastern Europe. From 1551 he was involved in the Osiandrian controversy, an extensive Lutheran debate in Germany and Prussia which extended into the mid-1560s. While acknowledging both natures, human and divine, of Christ, Stancaro claimed that Jesus Christ was a mediator not as God but as a man: this doctrine was challenged by the theologian Andreas Musculus in a public discussion held in Berlin on October 10, 1552. Stancaro authored De Trinitate et Mediatore Domino nostro Iesu Christo adversus Henricum Bullingerum...Ad magnificos et generosos Dominos Nobiles ac eorum Ministeros a variis Pseudoevabelicis seductis a decade later in which he offered his views on the issue, mainly in response to Peter Martyr Vermigli, a strong critic of Stancaro. In 1562 he settled in Stopnica, where he led a comparatively quiet life in retirement. He died on November 12, 1574.

== Life ==
Stancaro was born in Mantua in 1501. He devoted himself to the humanities and scholarly learning, and was ordained as a priest in Padua. He published De modo legendi Hebraice institutio brevissima in 1530. Brought up a Roman Catholic, he became a Protestant in 1540, while teaching Hebrew at the University of Padua. He left for Venice, where he was arrested and imprisoned for sometime, joining another Protestant Italian, Francesco Negri. He left Venice in 1541, and arrived in Vienna by 1544. He was professor of Greek and Hebrew there, but lost his post in 1546.

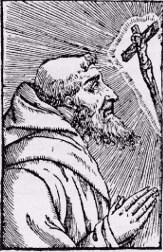
Bernardino Ochino, companion of Stancaro from March 1546.

In March 1546 he reached Regensburg, where he met Bernardino Ochino, with whom he went, via Ratisbon, to Augsburg to teach Greek and Hebrew. With the defeat of the Protestant Schmalkaldic League by the troops of Charles V, in 1547 Stancaro and Ochino fled Augsburg. They spent time in Strasbourg, where Ochino met up with old friend Peter Martyr and they received an invitation by Archbishop Cranmer to visit London. They also visited Constance and Zurich during this period, before finding refuge in Basel. At Basel he found the time to produce four theological works, Suae ebraee grammaticae compendium, nunc primum excussum, In epistolam canonicam D. Jacobi Heriolymitani expositio pia, Miscellanea theologica. Nempe gradus beneficiorum dei, de templis Judaeorum, bibliorum scriptroes, deprophetis, Israeliticus ordo, de synagogis, modus legendas prophetas, linguae ebrae inclinatio, ebrei unde dicti, lectionis in synagoga. Noviter excussa, and Opera nuova di F. S. Mantovano della Riformatione, si della dottrina Christiana, come della vera intelligentia dei sacramenti. con maturi consideratione et fondamento della scrittura santa, et consoglio de Santi Padri. non solamente utile, ma necessaria a ogni stato et conditione di Persone. In 1546 he was said to have published a "false opinion" in that there were "supposed to be two different Messiahs, one of a host of unusual notions entertained by Anabaptists." After fruitlessly searching in vain for a job as a teacher of theology, he returned to Chiavenna.

Stancaro moved on to the Grisons and reached Transylvania by the end of 1548, where he had support from Isabella Jagiellon, who provided introductions for him. In 1549 he obtained work as a teacher of theology at the University of Cracow, a position which he was forced to abandon when in March 1550 he was denounced as a Protestant for denying the Catholic doctrine of the intercession of saints. While at the University of Cracow, he is said to have argued that the Eucharist was a promise of a gift to be bestowed in heaven, and not the real flesh and blood of Christ. The small school of theologians who came to agree with this position were labelled Arrhabonarii after the Greek word Ἀρραβων, Arrha, meaning "earnest".

In Poland his oratorical talents and scholarship was recognized, particularly amongst the aristocracy. Barbara Sher Tinsley says of him, "Stancaro pursued a line of reasoning that actually encouraged some orthodox colleagues to defend Antitrinitarian positions in Poland and accidentally caused the downfall of Reform in that country. Still, [as Pierre Bayle admitted], Stancaro was one of the most successful people who had worked to established the Reformed faith in Poland." Although Stancaro believed in the co-equality of the Son and the Father and acknowledged both natures, human and divine, of Christ, he believed that "Christ was mediator by virtue of his humanity, not by virtue of his divinity, in order not to subordinate the Son to the Father." He was imprisoned in Lipowitz but obtained the protection of some Polish nobles and his escape was arranged, and, with help from Calvinist nobleman Mikołaj Oleśnicki, was able to set up the Helvetic-Italian Reformed Church of Poland in Pińczów. He engaged in debate with a small circle of Protestants in the town such as Jan Laski, Piotr of Goniądz and Peter Martyr Vermigli; his contemporaries considered Stancaro to be hot-tempered and arrogant, tendentious in his beliefs. Yet he was considered to be a "highly cultivated man, a refined student of Hebrew." According to Pierre Bayle and others, Stancaro convinced Oleśnicki to banish all of the monks from Pińczów. Stancaro led the first Protestant service at the church on 25 November 1550, but his term as pastor was to prove short-lived; a royal decree of December 12, 1550 imposed the dissolution of the church and Stancaro had to leave Poland to Germany. He was criticized by Stanislas Orzechowski, who had turned against Protestantism, and authored a popular work denouncing his beliefs.

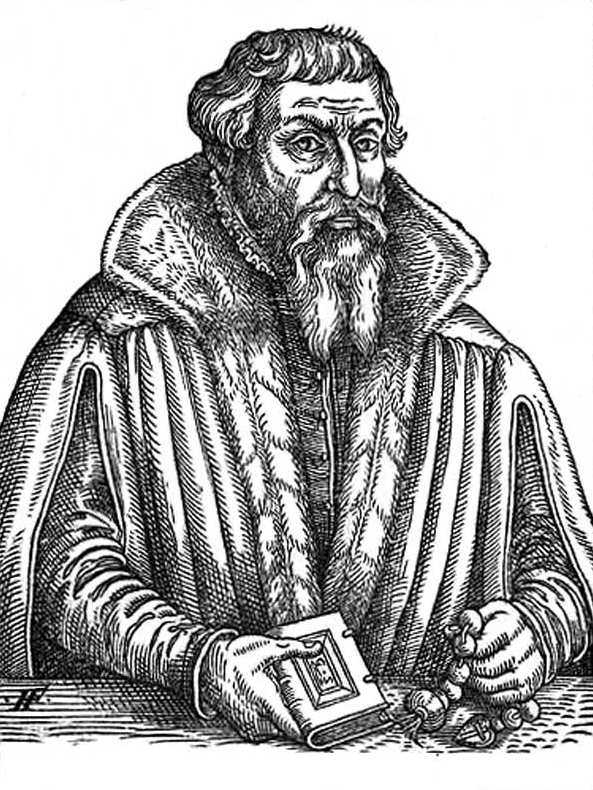
Andreas Musculus who debated the Osiandrian controversy with Stancaro in 1552.

Stancaro moved on to Königsberg, where he obtained the chair of Hebrew at the University of Königsberg in May 1551, before moving on to Frankfurt (Oder). At this point he was involved in the Osiandrian controversy. Stancaro's views on the trinity were challenged and contradicted by the theologian Andreas Musculus in a public discussion held in Berlin on October 10, 1552. Stancaro's writing Apologia contra Osiandrum rendered the dispute so violent that the Elector Joachim II of Brandenburg summoned Melanchthon and Bugenhagen from Wittenberg to Frankfurt in the autumn of 1552 in order to investigate the dispute. They did not travel, but Melanchthon stated in opposition to Stancaro that Christ, like a priest, was a mediator in two natures. Melanchthon published Responsio de controversiis Stancari scripta in June 1552, and Stancaro was forced to leave Frankfurt. Around this time he published Canones Reformationis (also Canones reformationis ecclesiarum Polonicarum or Riformatione), although some give the date of publication as earlier and state 1548 or 1550; the truth though appears to be that he drafted the work in Pińczów in 1650 and published it two years later while in Frankfurt-on-the-Oder in 1552. The work of 50 theological propositions received considerable attention amongst Polish noblemen and their wives in the 1550s.

He continued an itinerant existence in Eastern Europe; indeed Stephen Edmondson refers to him as the "wandering Italian theologian". Stancaro authored De Trinitate et Mediatore Domino nostro Iesu Christo adversus Henricum Bullingerum...Ad magnificos et generosos Dominos Nobiles ac eorum Ministeros a variis Pseudoevabelicis seductis a decade later in 1562 in which he offered his views on the issue, mainly in response to the letters of Peter Martyr Vermigli, a strong critic of Stancero.

In November 1554 he settled in Transylvania, enjoying the protection of the Hungarian lord Péter Petrovics, who he served as a personal physician to at his castle. During his time with Petrovics he influenced numerous people in Hungary such as the Debrecen clergyman Tamás Arany, who became involved in a heated debate with Calvinist bishop Péter Melius Juhász over Antitrinitarian issues. After the death of his patron in May 1559, he returned to Poland where he published his Collatio doctrinae Arrii et Melanchthonis Philippi, in which Philip Melanchthon accused him of Arianism. For this reason he came into conflict with Francesco Lismanini and Jan Laski, leading to imprisonment on 28 June 1559 at Wlodzislaw. Stancaro was released and moved to Dubiecko. Here he was involved in the Synod of Książ, held in September 1560, and a year later he founded a Reformed church, an existence which was to be short-lived. During his time in Dubiecko he authored Collatio doctrinae Arrii, et Philippi Melanchthonis, et sequacium Arrii et Philippi Melanchthonis et Francisci Davidis et reliquorum Saxonum doctrina de Filio Dei, Domino Jesu Christo, vna est et eadem and De officiis mediatoris domini Jesu Christi et secundum quam naturam haec officia exhibuerit et executusd fuerit. In 1562 he settled in Stopnica, where he led a comparatively quiet life in retirement. He died on November 12, 1574.

== Works ==
- De modo legendi Hebraice institutio brevissima, Venedig (1530)
- Suae ebraee grammaticae compendium, nunc primum excussum, Basel (1547)
- In epistolam canonicam D. Jacobi Heriolymitani expositio pia, Basel (1547)
- Miscellanea theologica. Nempe gradus beneficiorum dei, de templis Judaeorum, bibliorum scriptroes, deprophetis, Israeliticus ordo, de synagogis, modus legendas prophetas, linguae ebrae inclinatio, ebrei unde dicti, lectionis in synagoga. Noviter excussa, (1547)
- Opera nuova di F. S. Mantovano della Riformatione, si della dottrina Christiana, come della vera intelligentia dei sacramenti. con maturi consideratione et fondamento della scrittura santa, et consoglio de Santi Padri. non solamente utile, ma necessaria a ogni stato et conditione di Persone, Basel (1547)
- Canones Reformationis, Frankfurt/Oder (1552)
- Collatio doctrinae Arrii, et Philippi Melanchthonis, et sequacium Arrii et Philippi Melanchthonis et Francisci Davidis et reliquorum Saxonum doctrina de Filio Dei, Domino Jesu Christo, vna est et eadem, (1559)
- De officiis mediatoris domini Jesu Christi et secundum quam naturam haec officia exhibuerit et executusd fuerit, (1559)
- De Trinitate et Mediatore Domino nostro Iesu Christo adversus Henricum Bullingerum...Ad magnificos et generosos Dominos Nobiles ac eorum Ministeros a variis Pseudoevabelicis seductis, Kraków (1562)
- Summa confessionis fidei F: S. Matvani, et quorundam discipulorum suorum, triginta octo articulis comprehensa, (1570)
