= The Adoration of the Sacrament =

Book by Martin Luther

The Adoration of the Sacrament (1523) (German: Vom Anbeten des Sakraments des heiligen leichnams Christi) is Martin Luther's treatise, written to Bohemian Brethren to defend the adoration of the body and blood of Christ in the Eucharist.

The theology expressed in The Adoration of the Sacrament in favour of Eucharistic adoration has been heralded by Gnesio-Lutherans, as well as certain High church Lutherans, especially Evangelical Catholics.

== Original German text ==
- Vom Anbeten des Sakraments des heiligen leichnams Christi. Luthers Werk: Weimarer Ausgabe, vol. 11, pp. 417–456

== English translation ==
- The Adoration of the Sacrament. Luther's Works: American Edition, vol. 36, pp. 268–305 ISBN 0-8006-0336-2 ISBN 9780800603366
