= Osiandrian controversy =

Lutheran debate over imputed righteousness

The Osiandrian controversy was a controversy amongst the Lutherans, originated in around 1550 by Andreas Osiander, a German theologian. He asserted that it was only through the righteousness of Christ with respect to the divine nature (entirely excluding the righteousness of Christ with respect to the human nature) that mankind could obtain justification, and that men became partakers of Christ's divine righteousness through faith. Osiander thought the prevailing current in his area gave an overemphasis on forensic justification--he saw Christ as a physician who heals instead of as a judge who declares one righteous. He taught that God does not declare the sinner just, but makes him just. Osiander held that justification does not impute Christ's obedience and righteousness to the sinner, but instead the indwelling of Christ causes justification.

== Criticism and debate ==
Osiandrianism was opposed by Nicolaus von Amsdorf, Martin Chemnitz, Matthias Flacius, Philip Melanchthon, and Joachim Mörlin. They criticized Osiander for breaking the "close connection between alien and proper righteousness and the idea that both were rooted in the cross of Christ" Eventually the strictly anti-Osiandrian view prevailed. Part three of the Epitome of the Formula of Concord rejected Osiandiranism by stating that "Christ is our Righteousness neither according to the divine nature alone nor according to the human nature alone, but that it is the entire Christ according to both natures, in His obedience alone, which as God and man He rendered to the Father even unto death, and thereby merited for us the forgiveness of sins and eternal life, as it is written: As by one man's disobedience many were made sinners, so by the obedience of One shall many be made righteous," (Romans 5:19)

This doctrine was opposed principally by Francesco Stancaro, who ran to the opposite extreme of excluding entirely Christ's divine nature from all concern in the redemption procured for sinners. This controversy led to others, which were highly detrimental to the interests of the Lutheran church.

Philip Melanchthon offered an early opinion on the Osiandrian controversy. Although his letter to Osiander was generally positive, he criticized Osiander, especially for "not including a discussion of Christ's meritorious death when mentioning Christ's essential righteousness." On 27 May 1551, Joachim Mörlin publicly attacked Osiander from the pulpit, which Osiander defended at the pulpit four days later. Johannes Brenz was also outspoken on the controversy and urged Osiander to "avoid causing division among the Evangelicals at this dangerous time". The controversy continued until around 1566 but continued to be discussed for centuries — notably by Eduard Böhl in the late 19th century, who declared it to have had an impact upon reformed theology. In 1555 there were outbreaks of violence in Prussia over the Osiandrian controversy.
