= Utenbach =

- Ortsteil of Mertendorf
- Interactive map of Utenbach
- Location within Germany Location within Saxony-Anhalt
- Coordinates: 51°4′N 11°53′E
- Country: Germany
- State: Saxony-Anhalt
- District: Burgenlandkreis
- Municipality: Mertendorf

Area
  - Total: 5.08 km^{2} (1.96 sq mi)
- Elevation: 205 m (673 ft)

Population (2006-12-31)
  - Total: 134
  - Density: 26.4/km^{2} (68.3/sq mi)
- Time zone: UTC+01:00 (CET)
  - Summer (DST): UTC+02:00 (CEST)
- Postal codes: 06618
- Dialling codes: 036694

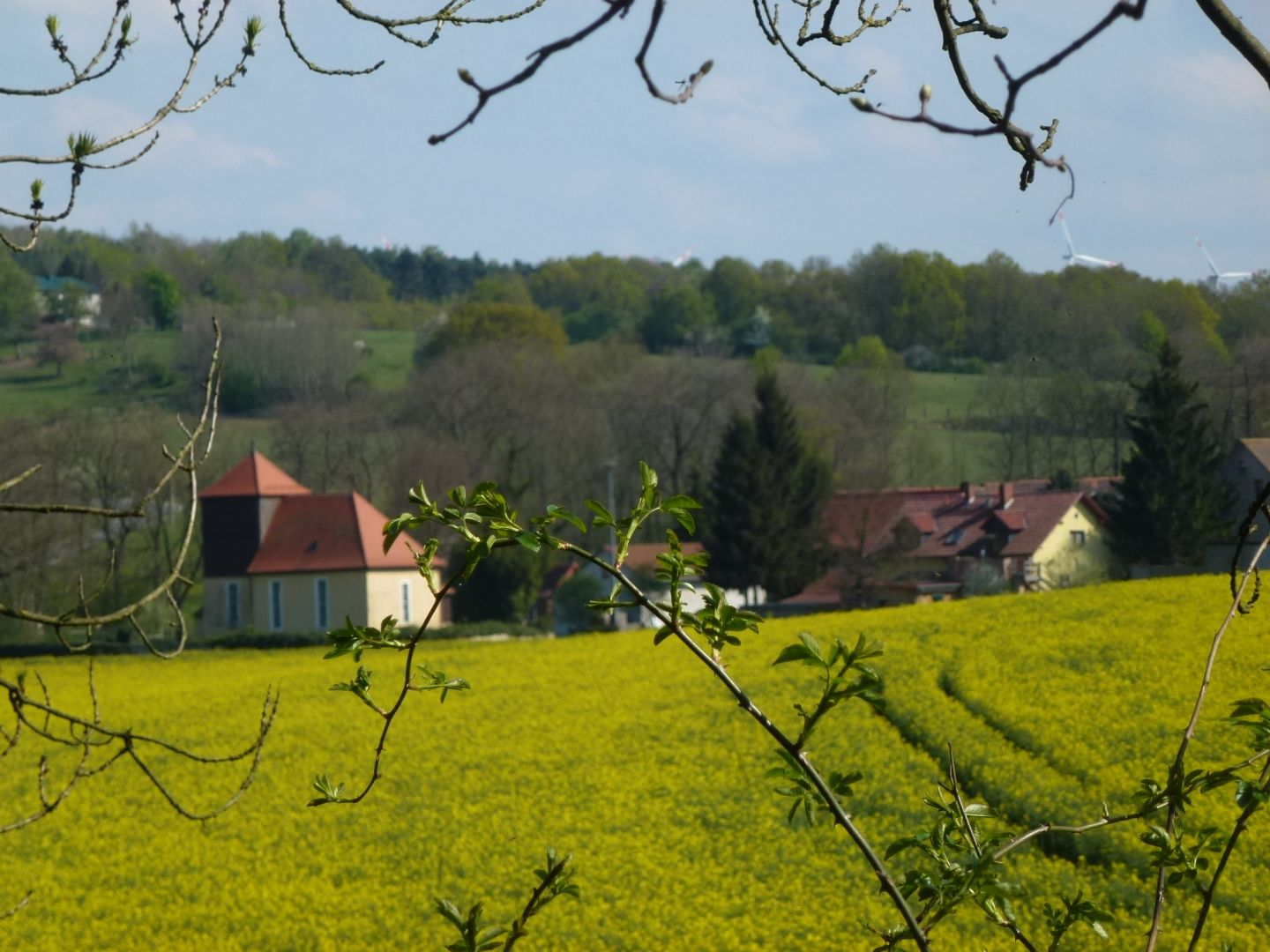
Utenbach

Utenbach (German pronunciation: [ˈuːtn̩bax]) is a village and a former municipality in the district Burgenlandkreis, in Saxony-Anhalt, Germany. Since 1 January 2010, it is part of the municipality Mertendorf.
