= Konrad Öttinger =

German theologian

Konrad Öttinger (born Pforzheim, Germany, died 1540) was a Reformation era German Lutheran pastor, and the court chaplain of Philip I, Landgrave of Hesse. He was one of the signatories to the Smalcald Articles.
