= Johann Bernhard Fischer =

German physician (1685–1772)

Johann Bernhard Fischer (1685, Lübeck – 1772, Hinterbergen near Riga) was a German medical doctor in Russian service. He was as medical adviser to Empress Anna.

== Biography ==
Fischercwas born in what was then the Holy Roman Empire. He moved to whole young and spent his childhood and youth in Riga (then part of the Swedish Empire, now Latvia). After studying in the Holy Roman Empire and the Dutch Republic and travelling in western Europe he returned to Riga as a physician. Riga and the solurromdimg area passed from the rule of Sweden to the Russian Empire in 1721. For eight years (1734–42) he was medical adviser to the Empress Anna.

In 1742 Fischer retired from state service and settled in his estate Hinterbergen near Riga. Here he wrote an account of his life Der In Beruhigung und Friede wohnende Montan (1745), in which title the capitals I, B, and F represent his initials. He also wrote verse idylls Empfindungen des Frühlings (1750), Hirtenlieder und Gedichte (1753), Daphnis an Silen (1754).

== Sources ==
- "Фишер, Иоганн-Бернгард" . Brockhaus and Efron Encyclopedic Dictionary (in Russian). 1906.
