= Andreas Musculus =

German Lutheran theologian (1514-1581)

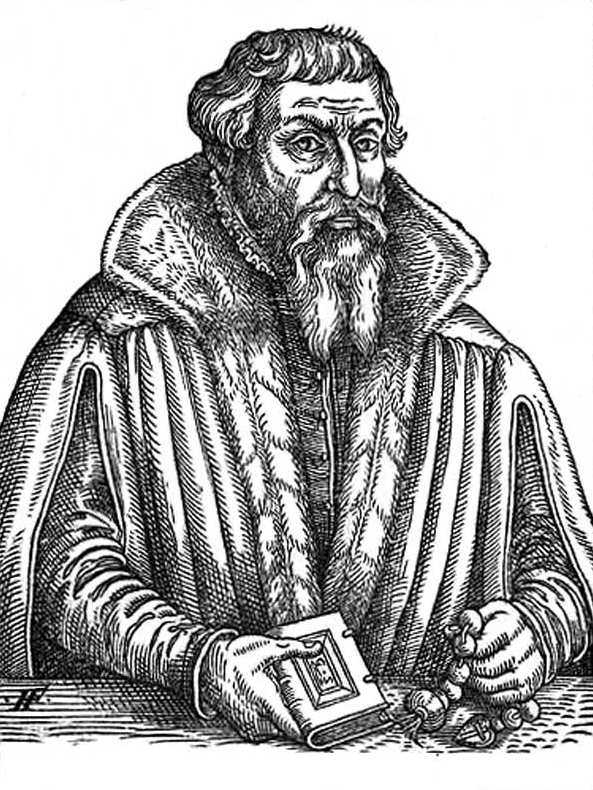
- Andreas Musculus with rosary
- Born: Andreas Meusel; 29 November 1514; Schneeberg
- Died: 29 September 1581 (aged 66); Frankfurt an der Oder
- Occupation(s): Lutheran theologian and Protestant reformer

Andreas Musculus (Latinized for Andreas Meusel; 29 November 1514 – 29 September 1581) was a German Lutheran theologian and Protestant reformer.

Musculus was born in Schneeberg, "generally called only Musculus" and educated in Leipzig and Wittenberg. While studying theology in Wittenberg he attended lectures by Martin Luther and Philip Melanchthon and married a sister-in-law of Johannes Agricola. He became professor at the university of Frankfurt an der Oder. As a theologian he was Gnesio-Lutheran and wrote polemics against the Interim, Andreas Osiander the Elder, Franciscus Stancarus, Philipp Melanchthon and John Calvin.

Musculus was one of the co-authors of the Formula of Concord. He was also one of the most remarkable defenders of Eucharistic adoration in early Lutheranism. His main work on this subject is Propositiones de vera, reali et substantiali praesentia, Corporis & Sanguinis IESU Christi in Sacramento Altaris, Francofordiae ad Oderam, 1573 (thesis IX: An adoratio Christi praesentis in coena sit approbanda). He also edited prayer books with the classical hymns for the adoration of the Sacrament . E.g. his Precationes ex veteribus orthodoxis included Lauda Sion and Pange lingua. He died in Frankfurt an der Oder.

== Works ==
- Vom Hosen Teuffel. Gedruckt zu Franckfurt an der Oder durch Johann Eichorn, (Google Books) 1555.
- Wider den Ehteuffel. Gedruckt zu Franckfurt an der Oder durch Johann Eichorn, (Google Books) 1556.
- Vom Gotslestern. (Google Books) 1556.
- Beider Antichrist, des Constantinopolitanischen / vnd Römischen / einstimmig vnd gleichfoermig Leer Glauben und Religion Wieder Christum den Son deß lebendigen Gottes durch D. Andream Musculum. (Google Books) 1557.
- Vom jüngsten Tage. Kolophon: Gedruckt zu Erffurt / durch Georgium Bawman / zum bunten Lawen / bey Sanct Paul. (Google Books) 1557.
- Wider den Fluchteufel. Von dem Unchristlichen, erschrecklichen und grausamen Fluchen und Gottslesterung, trewe und wolmeinede Vermanung und Warnung. (Google Books) 1561.
- Von des Teufels Tyranney, Macht vnd Gewalt, sonderlich in diesen letzten tagen, vnterrichtung. Gedruckt zu Erffurdt durch Georgium Bawmann bey St. Paul. Anno 1561 (Google Books)
- Bedencks Ende. Kolophon: Gedruckt zu Franckfurt an der Oder / durch Johan Eichorn 1572. (Google Books)
