= Heinrich von Kettenbach =

Franciscan friar and Protestant reformer

Heinrich von Kettenbach (fl. 1521-1522) was a Franciscan friar who became a preacher and Protestant reformer in the early German Reformation.

== Biography ==
Almost nothing is known about Kettenbach's early life. He was a monastic novice at Keizersberg Abbey in 1507/1508 and at Mainz Cathedral to 1510. He served as a preacher in Heilbronn and Mainz for the next decade, though nothing is known of the substance of his teachings at the time. Sometime in 1520, he left to follow the reformer Eberlin von Günzburg in Ulm. Ulm was part of the urban origins of the German Reformation in the early 1520s, and it was in this city that Kettenbach began preaching a more protestant or Lutheran message. Kettenbach also published at least nineteen pamphlets and sermons on behalf of the reformers cause, several of which were reprinted across the Holy Roman Empire. Kettenbach's writings were popular, in large part, because he wrote in a conversational or common German. Like other reformers of the time, he emphasized the need to print the Bible in vernacular languages like German, and Kettenbach's own writings were entirely in German. He wrote and preached for a reformed church, removed from the abuses of priests, monks and popes, and could at times write colloquially or vulgarly to convey his message.

In July 1522, Kettenbach fled Ulm for Bamberg. Kettenbach seems to have fled for fear of greater persecution at the hands of the unsympathetic monks of Ulm, as he was unable to deliver a sermon he had written before his departure. Kettenbach was probably still alive in 1523, as printers in Germany continued to publish newer writings, but by 1524 the trail runs cold. Kettenbach was a shortlived participant in the flurry of writings that accompanied the first decade of the Reformation in Germany. He was certainly one of the more popular writers, and his works were eagerly purchased across the Empire. He may have traveled to Luther's Wittenberg, but he most likely passed away sometime between 1523-1524.
