= Zacharias Praetorius =

German writer

Zacharias Breiter
- Born: 15 April 1535; Mansfeld, Saxony-Anhalt, Germany
- Died: 22 December 1575 (aged 40); Eisleben, Saxony-Anhalt, Germany
- Occupation: Poet
- Spouse: Magdalena Sarcerius
- Parent(s): Sebastian Breiter, Margaret Platner

Zacharias Praetorius (né Breiter; 15 April 1535 in Mansfeld – 22 December 1575 in Eisleben) was a German Lutheran poet and theologian.

== Early life and education ==
Praetorius was born to city councilman Sebastian Breiter and Margaret Platner, who was from the city of Stolberg; both were friends of Martin Luther. In 1553, he began his studies at the Leucorea at the University of Wittenberg, where he was crowned poeta laureatus in 1556, and passed the Magister exams in 1557. After a conversation with fellow Lutheran Philip Melanchthon, who, according to Johann Heinrich Zedler, considered Praetorius to be the best poet in all of Germany, Praetorius Latinized his name from the Germanic name Breiter.

== Career ==
He served as a deacon of St. Andrew's Church in Eisleben in 1559, and later served at Orth an der Donau in 1564. Praetorius then returned, after a time in Regensburg, to Eisleben to work, and was disposed by the church in 1575 for criticizing the expulsion of his colleague Cyriacus Spangenberg after the Flacian controversy.

During his time in Austria in the 1560s, Praetorius experienced religious persecution due to his Lutheran beliefs. It is recorded that in 1566, during his tenure in Orth an der Donau with fellow theologian Joachim Magdeburg, Barbara von Zinzendorff, daughter of theologian Christoph Reuter, told her father in description of Praetorius's dilemma that "If Magdeburg and Praetorius go back [to Germany], where they will not be persecuted, they will leave their wives and children in the highest degree to preach [Lutheran] theology. What they mean is clear[ly stated] in [Revelation] (lit: Apocalypse) 2-4, where the woman in infancy means the church, and where the dragon comes before the woman who is to give birth, that when she had given birth, he might devour her child." Magdeburg stayed in Austria for many years after that, but Praetorius returned to Germany at the beginning of the 1570s.

Praetorius published a wide array of Latin writings while he was still a student, and later translated Luther's church hymns into Latin verse. With Johannes Aurifaber, he also contributed to the latter's Table Speeches Colloquia. In Eisleben, in addition to sermons, he published many catechisms and writings that were seen as controversial by the church.

One of Praetorius's niches was his writing of poetry for the deceased, such as that Balthasar Podlodowski, who was a peer of Praetorius during his formative years. Podlodowski was killed in Dresden on 30 July 1556 following an accident with his horse.

== Relationships with Catholics and other Lutherans ==
As Praetorius was a staunch Flacian, his relationship with other thinkers waned. In the beginning of his career, he was good friends with Nikolaus Selnecker, Melanchthon, and Christophe Thretius. His relationship with the thinkers deteriorated as Thretius became more influenced by Swiss Lutheranism, Selnecker with the Concordians, and Melanchton with his anti-Flacian views.

In Didacus Sarmiento Valladares' Novissimus Librorum Prohibitorum et Expurgandorum Index Pro Catholicis Hispaniarum Regnis Philippi V. Regis Catholici cum integro indice cognominum auctorum primae, & secundae classis, a 1707 listing of all religious books banned by King Phillip V of Spain, Praetorius is listed as a banned author due to his use of the Augsburg Confession in his teachings.

== Family ==
In August 1559, Praetorius married Magdalene Sarcerius, daughter of Lutheran theologian Erasmus Sarcerius. Magdalene died in 1660 in Eisleben a year into the marriage.

Upon the death of his father-in-law in 1559, a few months prior to his marriage, Praetorius wrote a eulogy titled Pious Lamentations on the Death of Reverend and Saint Virid. Erasmus Sarcerius in his honor.

== Bibliography ==
- Historia Gemmae Quam Unionem Romani, Margaritum Caeterae Nationes Nominant: Ad Dita Allegorica Intepretatione (1555)
- Epithalamion Venerando et Doctor Virom, Iohanni Vuigando, pastori in inclyta magdeburga apud d. vdalricum, et reliquarum ecclesiarum inspectori: et pudicissimae virgini, hevae filiae melchioris dreseri civis mansfeldensis (1555)
- De Pentecoste Veteris et Novi Testamenti: Item, de Triumpho Christi Ascendentis in Coelum (1556)
- Elegia de Coniugio Clariss. Virid. Georgii Purkircheri Artis Medicae Doctoris, et Pudicissimae Virginis Sophiae Lerchefeldrianae, nobili ac patritio genere apud Posonienses editae (1556)
- Epithalamion Scriptum in Nuptiis Clarissimi et Doctissimi Viri d. Christophoria Schenitz, Artis Medicae Doctoris, et Pudicissimae Virginis Sponsae Ipsius Ursulae Costin (1556)
- Zachariae Praetorii Mansfeltensis Poetae Lavraeti: Epitaphia XXXI (1558)
- Zachariae Praetorii Mansfeldensis Poetae Lavreati: Liber Christiados De Beneficiis Christi: Hymni X (1558)
- De Vitis Regum Germanicorum, ab initio mundi usque ad tempora Constantini Magni, libri duo (1558)
- Confessio ecclesiaequae est in ditionecomitum mansfeltiorum quiivniores vocantur adversus praecipuas haereses (1560)
- Piae Lamentationes de Morte Reverendissimi et Sancti Virid Erasmi Sarcerij (1560)
- Epitaphium Annae Seidelianae Filiae Dulciss: Iosiae seidelii etc. Quae obiitdie XXII Man, hora 12. noctis in arce Roteburgensi, ad Salum Fluvium (1560)
- Brevis Responsio ad confessionem theologorum vvitebergensium de liberio arbitrio (1561)
- Kinder-Psalter, das ist, Die deutlichsten und allertrostlichsten Spruche (1563)
- Von vernunfft in heiliger Schrifft, und vom Son Gottes, welcher auch das wort genennei wird (1563)
- Epitaphium: In Obitum Margaridos coniugis Reverendi Virid. Iohannis Zelkii Pastoris Bornstetensis (1571)
- Antwort Auff M. Spangenbergs Gegenbericht von der Heubtsache im Streit uber der Erblunde, swischen ime und den Eisleben dredigern (1572)
- Vita Domini Nos: Tri Jesu Christi (1573)
- Sylua Pastorum, Das ist, Materienbuch aller handt predig ten fur einen Christlichen Pfarherr und Seelforger (1575)
- Sacer Thesaurus, Das ist, Von den vornehmsten Artikeln der Christlichen (1577)
