= Sacramentarians =

Protestants who denied transubstantiation

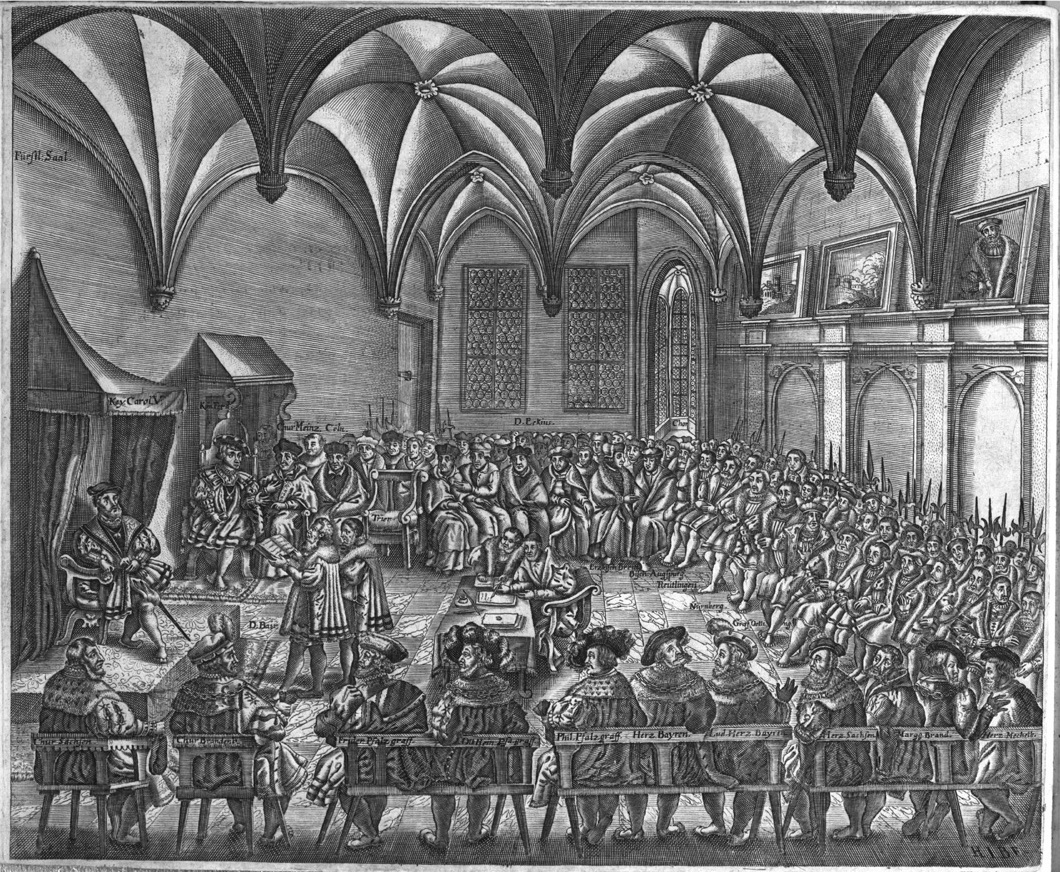
Reading of the Confessio Augustana by Emperor Charles V at the Diet of Augsburg, 1530

The Sacramentarians were Christians during the Protestant Reformation who denied not only the Roman Catholic transubstantiation but also the Lutheran sacramental union (as well as similar doctrines such as consubstantiation).

During the turbulent final years of Henry VIII's reign an influential faction of religious conservatives had dedicated themselves to rooting out what they considered heresy in English society, including the denial of the real presence in the sacrament of the Eucharist ("sacramentarianism"). The king had stopped burning heretics in 1543 and within a few years the divide between religious parties in English society gave rise to intense conflict, and ten radical Christians were executed. Women were less likely to be among those so condemned; even so, Anne Askew, a writer from an important Lincolnshire family with family connections to the royal household, was tortured and burned on July 16 as part of a campaign to undermine Queen Katherine Parr, herself suspected by certain factions of harboring heretical beliefs.

Sacramentarians comprised two parties:

1. the followers of Wolfgang Capito, Andreas Karlstadt and Martin Bucer, who at the Diet of Augsburg presented the Confessio Tetrapolitana from the cities of Strasbourg, Konstanz, Lindau and Memmingen.
2. the followers of the Swiss reformer Huldrych Zwingli, including Johannes Oecolampadius. Zwingli presented his own confession of faith at the Diet of Augsburg.

The doctrinal standpoint was the same – an admission of a spiritual presence of Christ which the devout soul can receive and enjoy, but a total rejection of any physical or corporeal presence.

After holding their own view for some years the four cities accepted the Confession of Augsburg, and were merged in the general body of Lutherans; but Zwingli's position was incorporated in the Helvetic Confession.

In the 19th and 20th centuries, an inversion of terms has led to the name "Sacramentarians" being applied to those who hold a high or extreme view of the efficacy of the sacraments.

== See also ==
- Real presence of Christ in the Eucharist
