= Matthäus Zell =

Lutheran pastor

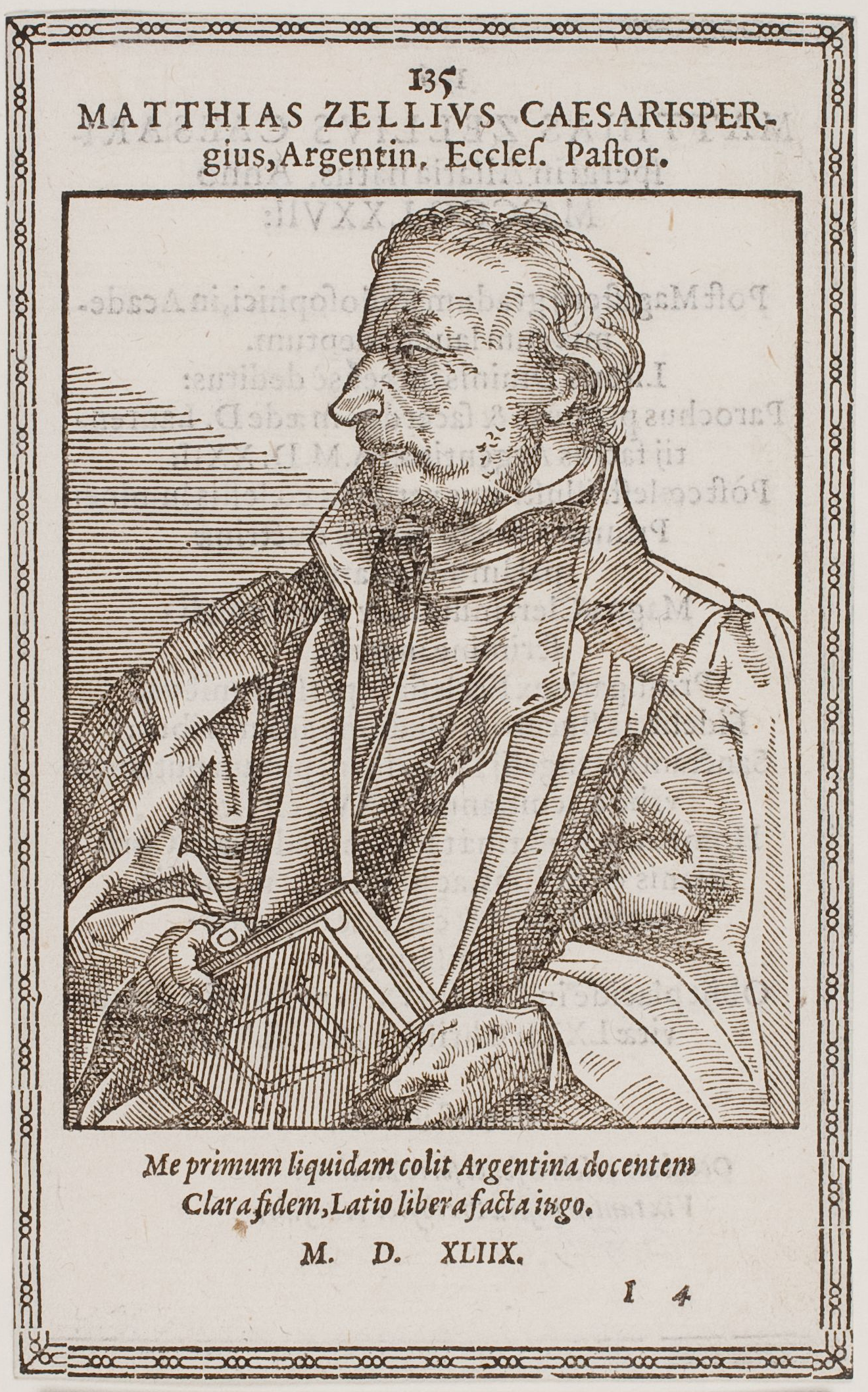
Matthäus Zell

Matthäus Zell (also Mathias Zell; anglicized as Matthew Zell) (21 September 1477, in Kaysersberg – 9 January 1548, in Strasbourg) was a Alsatian Lutheran pastor and an early Protestant reformer based in Strasbourg. He joined the Reformation as early as 1521.

His widow was Katharina Zell.

== Life ==
Zell was the son of a wine maker in Kaysersberg. He studied at the Universities of Mainz, Erfurt and Freiburg im Breisgau. His compatriot Johann Geiler von Kaysersberg exerted a strong influence on him.

After graduation, he taught for a time before taking over the pastorate of St Lawrence’s Chapel at Strasbourg Cathedral in 1518. In 1521 he showed public support for Luther’s teaching and was accused of being a heretic by the Bishop of Strasbourg.

In 1523 he broke Catholic regulations by getting married; his wife Katharina Schütz became the first citizen of Strasbourg to marry a priest. Zell continued to preach and write until his death. He was buried at the cemetery of St Urban.

== Publications ==
His written works include;

- Ein Collation auff die einfierung M. Anthonij, 1523;
- Christian Responsibility, 1523;
- Appellatio, 1524;
- Frag u. Antwort uff die Artickel d. Christl. glaubens, 1535;
- Abridged Fragbuechlin, 1537
