= Katharina Zell =

Protestant reformer and writer (1497/8–1562)

Katharina Schütz Zell (1497/98 – 5 September 1562) was an Alsatian Protestant reformer and writer during the Protestant Reformation. She was one of the first Protestant women to marry a clergyman. Katharina lived all of her life in Strasbourg. Strasbourg was incorporated within the Holy Roman Empire during this time period, but today is located in France close to the border of Germany.

== Biography ==
=== Early life and education ===
Katharina Schütz Zell was most likely born in early 1498 to Elisabeth Gerster and Jacob Schütz in Strasbourg. She had two older brothers, Jacob and Lux, and two older sisters, Elisabeth and Barbara. After she was born her parents had five more children, Margaret, Magdalene, Ursula, Andrea, and Jacob. The Schütz's were part of the artisan class, and though not of higher ranks, they were most likely one of Strasbourg's established families.

Katharina's family devoted a large portion of their personal finances to the education of their numerous children. Katharina herself received an excellent vernacular education. The exact form of schooling Katharina received is not clear, but it is clear that she learned to read and write German fluently, and eventually developed some basic knowledge of Latin. Katharina's interests in learning were mainly religious, as well as professional training, particularly preparation for an independent profession. This was also not the end of her education. She took it upon herself to continue independent learning throughout the rest of her life.

=== Reformation and Partnership ===
When Katharina was still fairly young, the Protestant Reformation was just coming about. Around this time, the teachings and writings of Martin Luther gained fame and began to spread. Katharina was introduced to much of these new teachings and views of religion by Matthew Zell, the pastor who took charge of the St. Lawrence Cathedral in Strasbourg in 1518. Katharina eventually started to take these beliefs as her own through Zell's sermons and Luther's teachings.

A few years after Matthew came to Strasbourg, he and Katharina got married. They were married by Martin Bucer at 6:00am on 3 December 1523. The reason behind her marriage was mainly vocational, "Katharina Schütz was convinced that she was called to marry Matthew Zell as an expression of her faith in God and her love for others." Katharina was one of the first people to marry a pastor, even before the marriage of Martin Luther, something that was not necessarily thought too highly of at the time. Her marriage was what would be seen as a true equal partnership in a society that required that the good wife be silent and obedient, and in which women usually only achieved independence as widows. Katharina had two children with Matthew, although they both died at very young ages. Mathew died on 9 January 1548. Though Katharina mourned and grieved his death, this did not stop her work. She dealt with her grief by intensifying her Bible study. Katharina herself became ill in 1561 and died on 5 September 1562. She was buried at the cemetery of St Urban. With her husband and children.

== Writings and works ==
Katharina is noted greatly for her writings and unique personal beliefs. She was very open-minded for a person of her time period and showed it through her actions and writings. Stjerna writes, "She believed a distinction should be made between people and creeds, the care for the former outweighing disagreements on the latter." Katharina was also aware that as a woman with very strong personal views and values, not all people would be supportive of her. She wrote, "What can I do or achieve now that I am a poor woman, who, so many say, should spin and care for the sick ... I am convinced that if I agreed with our preachers in everything I would be called the most pious and knowledgeable woman born in Germany. But since I disagree I am called an arrogant person and, as many say, Doctor Katharina (doctor being a demeaning term implying presumptuousness)"

One of Katharina's titles and occupations was that of a pamphleteer. Pamphlets were essential for Protestantism during the Reformation. Zitzlsperger writes, "Without pamphlets the Reformation would arguably not have had the same outcome. The pamphlets served to inform a wide audience quickly and with dogmatic effectiveness on current affairs. Noblewomen of the time would have been most likely in the public eye with their pamphlets much more than Katharina who, as a middle-class woman, tended to be less exposed since she was writing more for her local community.

As a woman of this time period, Katharina did face some challenges that the male pamphleteers would not have had. In facing criticism Katharina would remind her criticizers that she never forgot her responsibility as a wife and that she was her husband's partner. In doing so, Katharina showed his acknowledgment of her important role, and gave value to her personal contributions, "This is why my pious husband only called me his curate, although I never stood on the pulpit - something I did not have to do in my line of duties."

Katharina's voice was not just heard in Strasbourg. Martin Luther was personally familiar with her writing, and received a personal copy of Katharina's first public text, Letter to the suffering women of the community of Kentzingen, who believe in Christ, sisters with me in Jesus Christ. Katharina also met Martin Luther at some point in her lifetime.

One of Katharina's works was a set of books (in four volumes) containing the hymns of the Bohemian Brethren. In contrast to much of the other work that is known of Katharina, she took almost no part in the writing of the hymns in the book. The book had originally been produced in 1531 by Michael Weisse who gave strict instructions for the actual text of the book to not be altered, though she did add two other hymns. What Katharina did have some control over was the actual music behind the hymns, which went through some major changes by her. It is possible that Katharina had an assistant she relied on for the musical adaptation, though no such assistant is mentioned by her. Katharina's preface to the song book reveals her concern for the spiritual well-being of the laity, especially women:

"I found such an understanding of the works of God in this songbook that I want all people to understand it. I ought much rather to call it a teaching, prayer, and praise book than a songbook."

She considered these Bohemian songs more suitable in subject matter than any liturgical German hymns which had been published in Strasbourg. However, her editions of these books were never reprinted.

Katharina's experiences do not reflect those of the majority of women during the Reformation. The work she did was not ordinary of women in this time period. The Reformation actually produced fewer women writers than the previous medieval period. Women of this time period were expected to conform to certain roles and rules which were institutionally and socially enforced on them. Katharina is an example of a woman who broke through these barriers to get her beliefs out to the public. Katharina also differs from some other women reformers in that she was not subject to much threatening opposition. One woman who faced some of this opposition was Argula von Grumbach, another influential pamphleteer. In response to her public work, theologians from the University of Ingolstadt were "determined to have the "silly bag" tamed and punish the "female devil.""

== Veneration ==
In 2022, Zell was officially added to the Episcopal Church liturgical calendar with a feast day on 5 September.
