= Nicolaus Gallus =

Lutheran Reformation leader in Regensburg (c. 1516 – 1570)

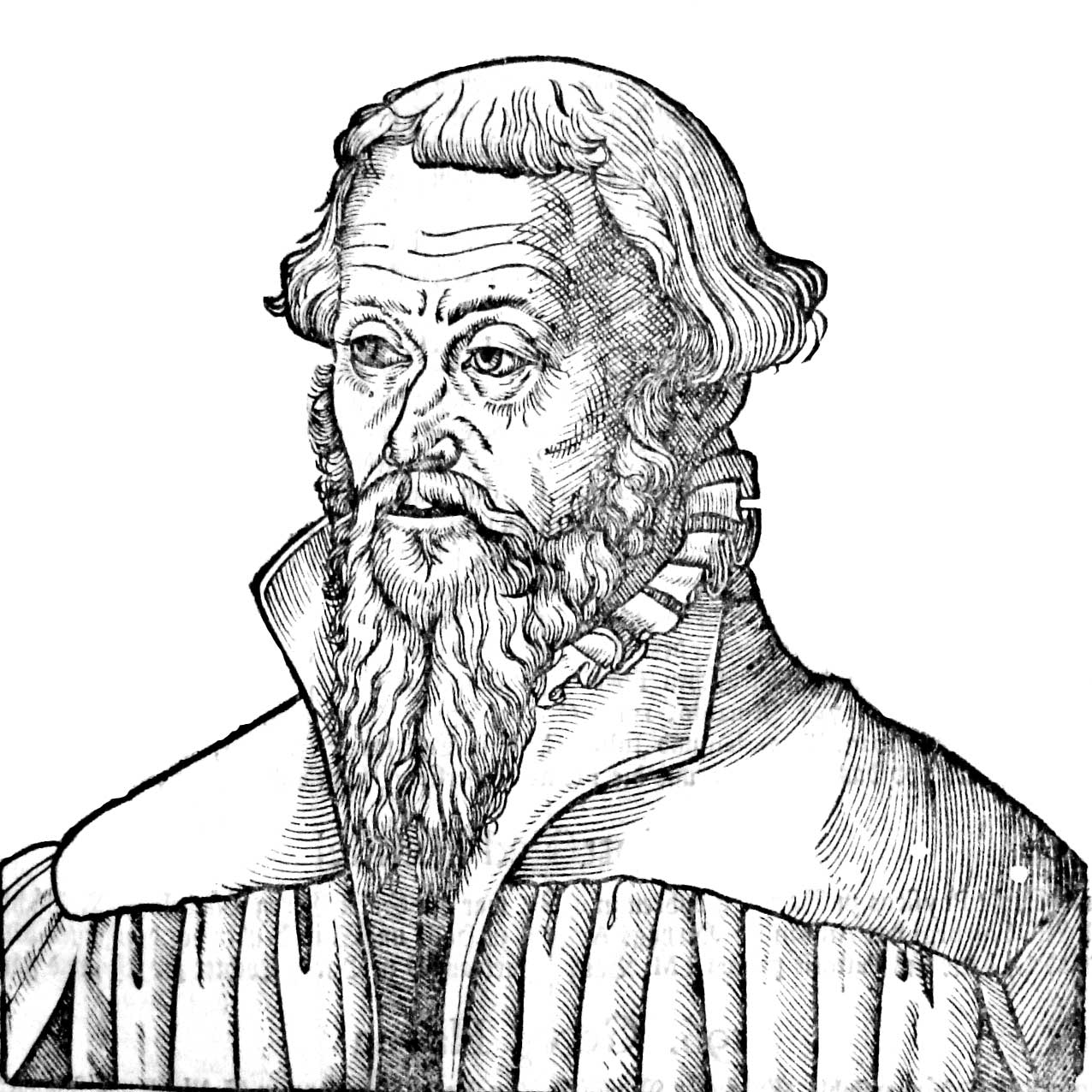
Nicolaus Gallus by Lucas Cranach

Nicolaus Gallus (also Hahn) (c. 1516 – June 1570) was leader of the Lutheran Reformation in Regensburg.

Gallus was born in Köthen. At Wittenberg, where he became a student in 1530 and received the master's degree in 1537, he won the commendation of Melanchthon. In 1543 Luther sent Hieronymus Nopus as preacher to Regensburg at the request of the city council and with him went Gallus, who was ordained by Bugenhagen in April. In 1548 trouble arose in Regensburg over the acceptance of the Interim. Gallus wrote a treatise against it, and had to leave the city; services in the only Evangelical church there were discontinued. For a time Gallus preached for Cruciger (who was ill) at Wittenberg, then in 1549, through the influence of his brother in law, Heinrich Merkel, city secretary at Magdeburg, he went to the Ulrich Church in that city. He joined Flacius in opposition to the adiaphorism of the Wittenberg circle and published a Disputation von Mitteldingen in 1550. In that same year he contributed to the Magdeburg Confession as its primary author. He remained in Magdeburg after its capitulation in 1551, and kept up the dispute against Osiander and Major. In June, 1553, Prince Wolfgang of Anhalt called him to his native city to assist in the settlement of the administration of the church property. In August, 1553, Gallus was called back to Regensburg as leader of the Evangelical cause. He worked there for almost seventeen years, and the effects of his activity were felt far beyond the borders of the town. In the disputes of the following years he fought faithfully on the side of Flacius. Like him he tried to influence Melanchthon by letters, but the latter treated Gallus rather haughtily. It probably angered him that Gallus had republished (1554) his Sententiae veterum de coena Domini, which was directed against Oecolampadius. In 1561 Gallus warned the princes convened at Naumburg of the spreading Calvinistic doctrine of the Lord's Supper (see: Crypto-Calvinism). He also got into a dispute with Brenz, whom he suspected of leanings toward Philippism. From 1562 to 1566 he furnished a refuge to Flacius, who had been expelled from Jena. Melanchthon reproached Gallus for fighting continually against the Evangelicals, instead of combating Romanism. However, during the diet in 1556, Gallus preached against the Roman Catholics, and there are still extant manuscripts containing theses of disputation against the Ingolstadt Catholics. In this connection may be mentioned Gallus' writing directed against Corpus Christi day: Vom abgöttischen Fest, Frohnleichnams-Tag genannt (1561).

Gallus campaigned against prostitution.

He died in Bad Liebenzell.
