= Erhard Schnepf =

German theologian

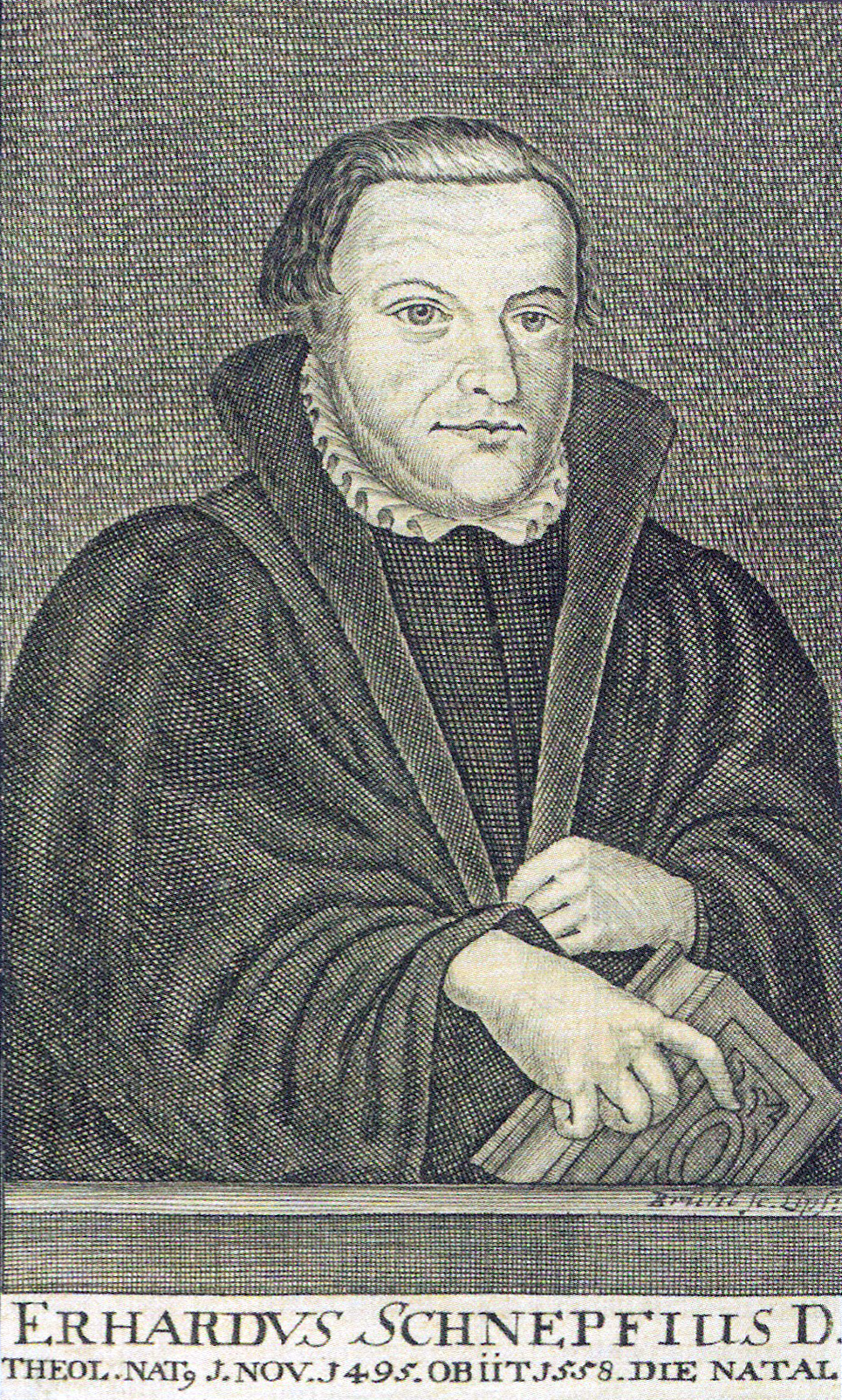
Erhard Schnepf

Erhard Schnepf (1 November 1495, Heilbronn – 1 November 1558, Jena; also Erhard Schnepff) was a German Lutheran Theologian, Pastor, and early Protestant reformer. He was among the earliest followers of Luther convinced to his views at the 1518 Heidelberg Disputation.

== Life ==
Schnepf was born into a prominent Heilbronn Family. He began his studies at the University of Erfurt in 1509 before moving to the University of Heidelberg in 1511, where he took his master's degree in 1513. He switched from legal to theological studies. Schnepf was one of the young masters who encountered Martin Luther at the famous Heidelberg Disputation. Schnepf soon became a committed follower of Luther.

He took over the preacher's office in the Württemberg territory of Weinsberg, as the successor of Johannes Oecolampadius, and preached the evangelical message there. When the duchy of Württemberg came under direct Habsburg control, Schnepf was driven from his post and took refuge with the more Protestant-minded Dietrich von Gemmingen. He worked first in Neckarmühlbach (near Castle Guttenberg) in the Kraichgau, and from 1523 in the imperial city of Bad Wimpfen, where he married the mayor's daughter Margaretha Wurzelmann.

Upon the request of Count Philip III of Nassau-Weilburg, he introduced the Reformation in 1525/26 at Weilburg. Landgrave Philip I the Magnanimous of Hesse invited him to become theology professor at his newly founded University of Marburg. Schnepf only reluctantly accepted the offer and finally took up the post on 19 August 1528. He was rector of the university in 1532 and 1534 and served as Philip's advisor at the imperial diets of Speyer (1529) and Augsburg (1530). In 1532 he turned down the offer to become the second pastor of Heilbronn after Johann Lachmann.

After the restoration of Duke Ulrich, Schnepf returned to Württemberg at his request to take part in the introduction of the Reformation there in 1534 working in concert with Ambrosius Blarer. Schnepf was named court preacher in Stuttgart and general superintendent of all of the Württemberg Protestant Church in 1535. He resigned this position in 1544 to become theology professor at the University of Tübingen simultaneously maintaining preaching duties. His resistance to the Augsburg Interim led to his dismissal from Württemberg service by Duke Ulrich in 1548. He received chair of Hebrew at the newly founded University of Jena and also became pastor and superintendent in Jena, where he died in 1558.
