= Paul Bodmer =

Swiss painter (1886–1983)

- Born: 18 August 1886; Zürich, Switzerland
- Died: 19 December 1983 (aged 97); Zürich, Switzerland
- Occupations: Painter, muralist
- Known for: Fraumünster frescoes

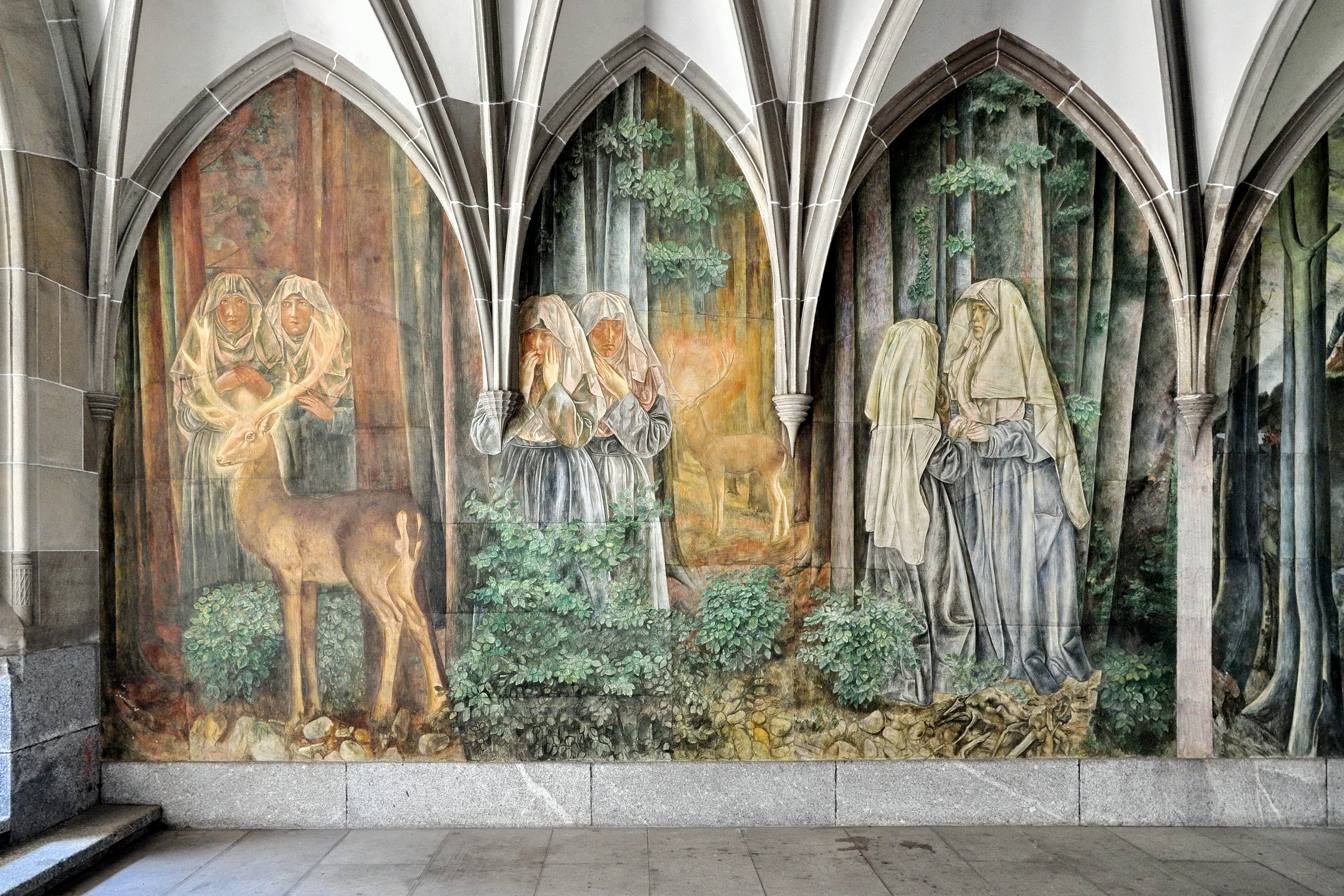
Paul Bodmer fresco in the Fraumünster cloister, Zürich

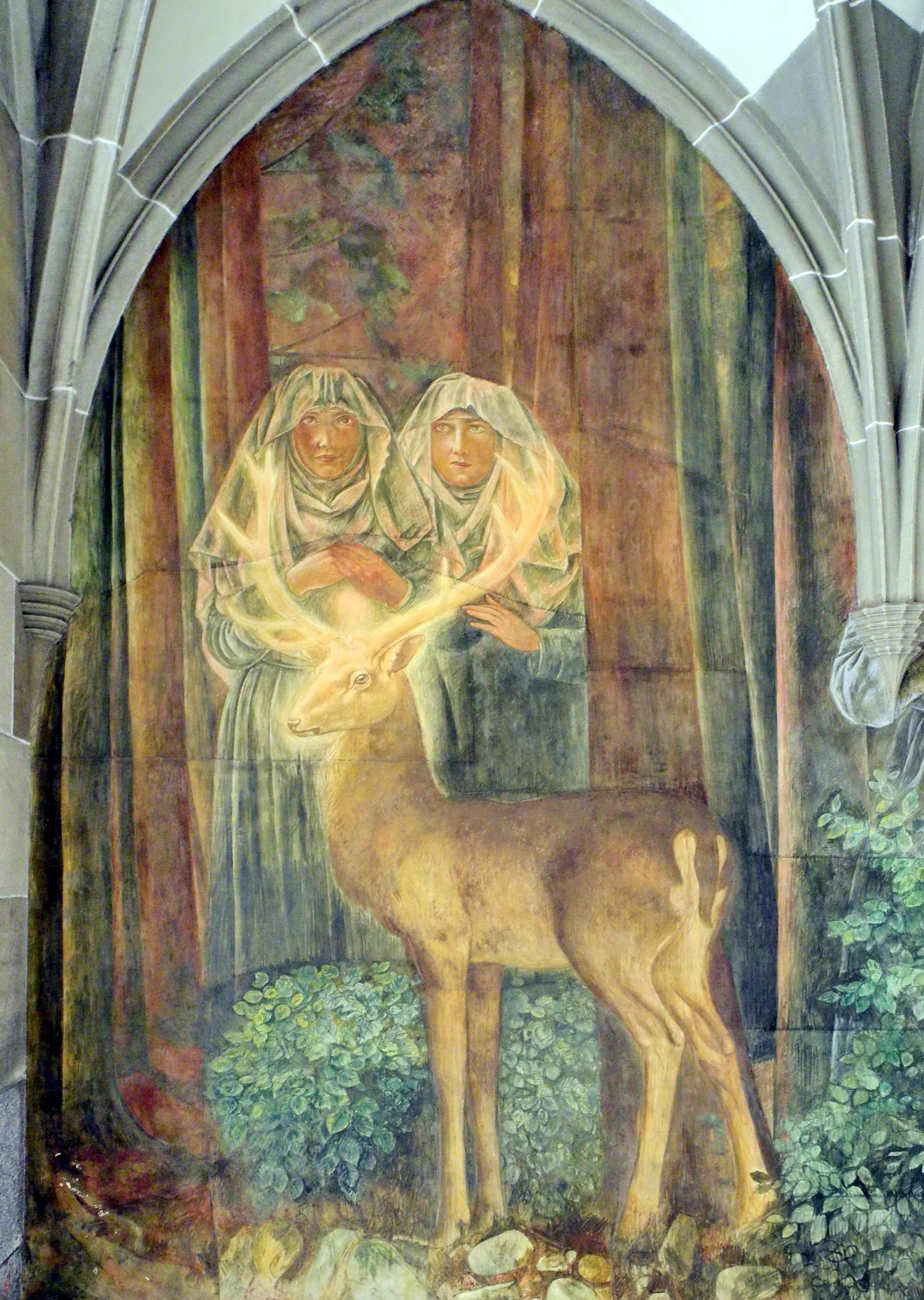
Paul Bodmer fresco depicting the daughters of Louis the German

Paul Bodmer (18 August 1886 – 19 December 1983) was a Swiss painter and muralist associated with the circle around Otto Meyer-Amden. He is best known for the series of frescoes he painted in the cloister of the Fraumünster in Zürich between 1924 and 1941.

== Biography ==
Paul Bodmer was born in Zürich on 18 August 1886. He grew up in Zürich and attended the Gewerbeschule and Kunstgewerbeschule before completing an apprenticeship as a theatre painter between 1903 and 1906.

From 1907 to 1910, Bodmer worked as a theatre painter in Berlin, Düsseldorf and other German cities. During this period, he undertook a study trip to the artists' colony at Worpswede. He returned to Switzerland in 1910 and began working as a freelance artist.

From 1910, Bodmer was associated with the circle around Otto Meyer-Amden in Switzerland. He married Emma Rauch in 1915 and taught at the Kunstgewerbeschule Zürich from 1917 to 1923. The couple had four children between 1916 and 1925, and from 1922 the family lived in Zollikerberg. He died in Zürich on 19 December 1983.

== Work ==
Bodmer's principal work was the series of frescoes he painted in the cloister of the Fraumünster in Zürich between 1924 and 1941. The frescoes depict legends associated with the Fraumünster and the city of Zürich, including stories about the city's patron saints Felix and Regula and traditions connected with Charlemagne. Bodmer and Otto Baumberger won the competition for the project in 1921, although Bodmer was later selected to execute the frescoes alone. He also created numerous frescoes for churches, community buildings and schools, in addition to panel paintings.

In his large-scale murals, Bodmer employed a drawing-based and sometimes sketch-like style, combined with restrained colour and light brushwork. He produced numerous preparatory studies in charcoal, pencil and watercolour, and also created smaller landscape paintings and figure compositions.

A central theme of Bodmer's work was the depiction of people in ceremonial and idyllic settings. He contributed to the renewal of Protestant religious painting in Switzerland.

Several of Bodmer's mural commissions in Zürich became controversial and were later painted over, including works at the University of Zürich. Following protests against the avant-garde project, the cantonal government ordered the removal of the university murals in 1915, and they were painted over the following year.
