= Hildegard (abbess of Fraumünster) =

Abbess of Fraumünster, daughter of Louis the German

Hildegarda
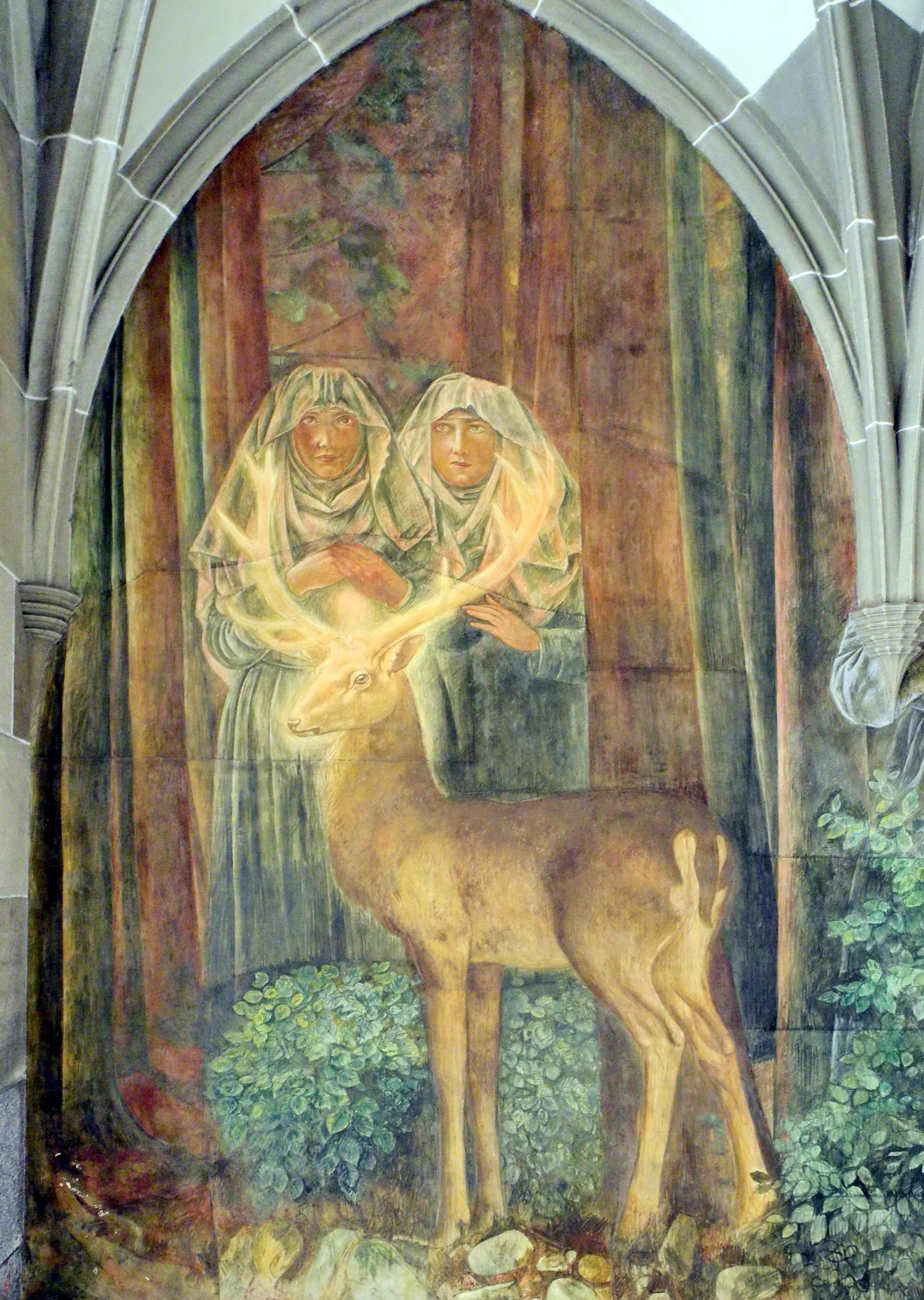
- Fresco by Paul Bodmer in the abbey of Fraumünster showing the two daughters of Louis the German

Abbess
- Honored in: Catholic Church
- Major shrine: Fraumünster
- Feast: 23 December

Hildegard (828 – December 23 856 or 859) was the daughter of Louis the German, Carolingian king of East Francia, and his wife Hemma. She was the abbess of Fraumünster, an abbey founded by her father.

== Life ==
Hildegard was the eldest child of Louis the German and the countess Hemma, born a year after their marriage.

In 844, she became the abbess of Münsterschwarzach in Bavaria, the Eigenkloster of the Carolingian court, founded in 780. On June 21, 853, Louis the German founded the abbey at Fraumünster, placing his daughter Hildegard as the abbess, while her younger sister Bertha succeeded her as abbess of Münsterschwarzach.

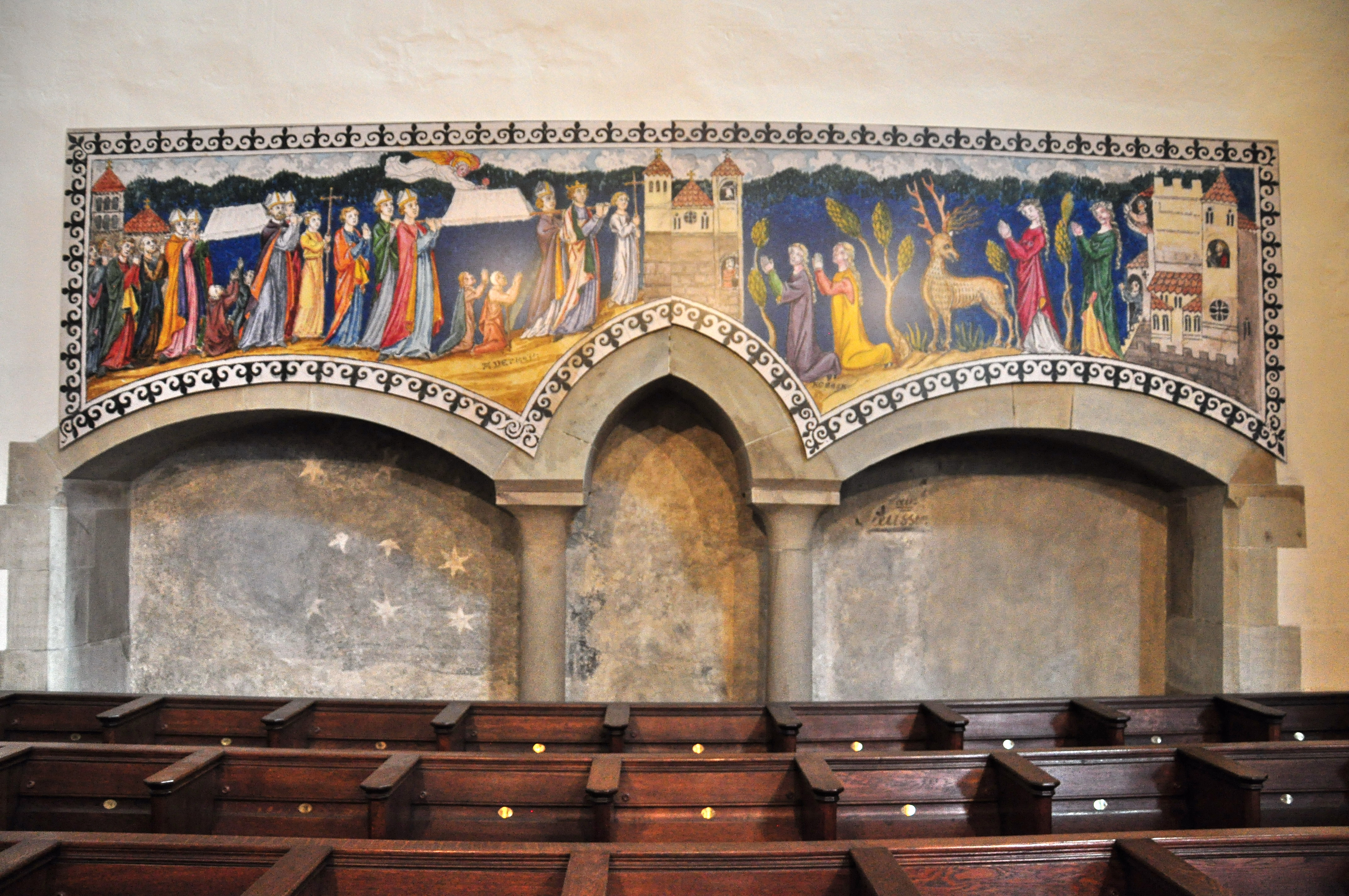
Interior view of Fraumünster showing a representation of the legend of the founding of the abbey.

According to legend, the two sisters were living a cloistered life together at Baldern Castle. While travelling to Zürich to pray at the chapel of Saints Felix and Regula, they saw a deer with lighted antlers, who led them through the forest to a location beside the River Limmat. The sisters took this as a sign from God that a church was to be built at that location, and Louis the German obeyed this divine invitation. What is historically certain is that an abbey had been recently founded at Fraumünster, and this abbey with its considerable property and right to autonomous jurisdiction was entrusted to Hildegard.

Hildegard gave to Meinrad of Einsiedeln an apparently wonder-working statue of Mary. Our Lady of Hermits continues to draw pilgrims and tourists to Einsiedeln.

Hildegard died December 23, 856 (some sources say 859). Her sister Bertha succeeded her as abbess of Fraumünster.

Hildegard is honored in the Catholic Church on 23 December.
