= Abbess =

Female superior of a community of nuns, often an abbey

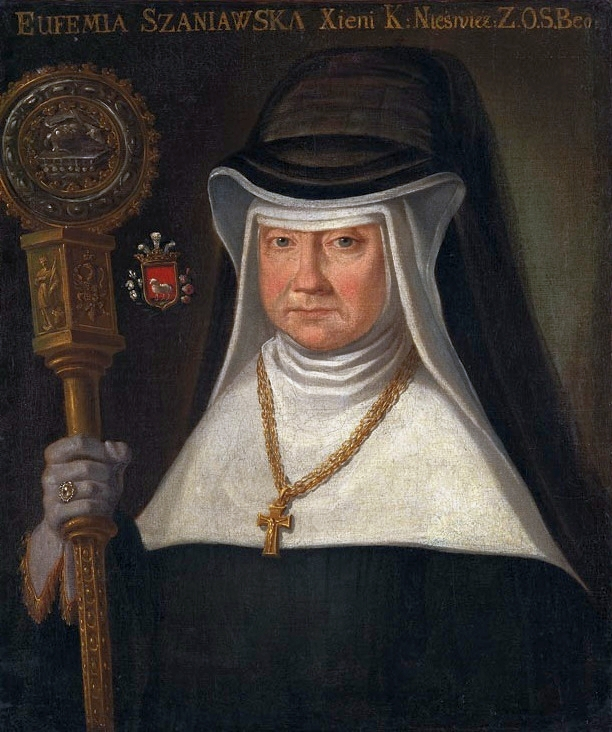
Eufemia Szaniawska, Abbess of the Benedictine Monastery in Nieśwież with a crosier, c. 1768, National Museum in Warsaw

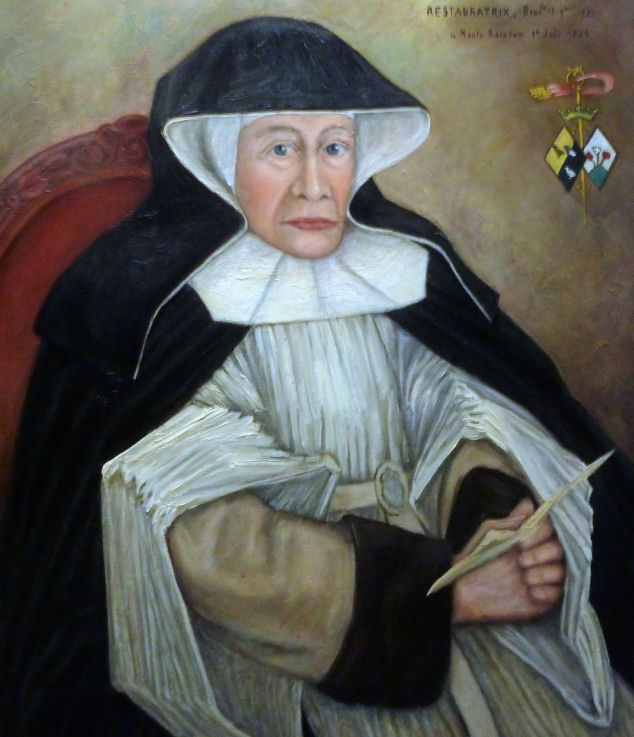
Abbess Joanna van Doorselaer de ten Ryen, Waasmunster Roosenberg Abbey

An abbess (Latin: abbatissa) is the female superior of a community of nuns in an abbey.

== Description ==
In the Catholic Church (both the Latin Church and Eastern Catholic), Eastern Orthodox, Coptic, Lutheran and Anglican abbeys, the mode of election, position, rights, and authority of an abbess correspond generally with those of an abbot. She must be at least 40 years old and have been a nun for 10 years. The age requirement in the Catholic Church has evolved over time, ranging from 30 to 60. In the rare case of there not being a nun with the qualifications, the requirements may be lowered to 30 years of age and five of those in an "upright manner", as determined by the superior. A woman who is of illegitimate birth, is not a virgin, has undergone non-salutory public penance, is a widow, or is blind or deaf, is typically disqualified for the position, saving by permission of the Holy See. The office is elective, the choice being by the secret votes of the nuns belonging to the community. Like an abbot, after being confirmed in her office by the Holy See, an abbess is solemnly admitted to her office by a formal blessing, conferred by the bishop in whose territory the monastery is located, or by an abbot or another bishop with appropriate permission. Unlike the abbot, the abbess receives only the ring, the crosier, and a copy of the rule of the order. She does not receive a mitre as part of the ceremony. The abbess also traditionally adds a pectoral cross to the outside of her habit as a symbol of office, though she continues to wear a modified form of her religious habit or dress, as she is unordained—females cannot be ordained—and so does not vest or use choir dress in the liturgy. An abbess serves for life, except in Italy and some adjacent islands.

=== Roles and responsibilities ===
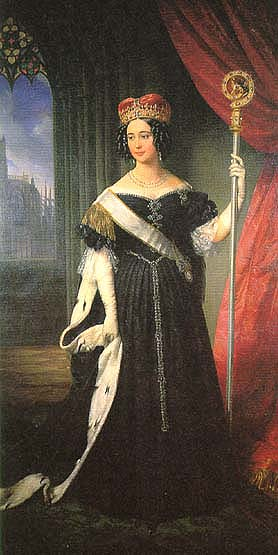
Maria Theresia Isabella of Austria, a noble abbess with her crosier

Abbesses are, like abbots, major superiors according to canon law, the equivalents of abbots or bishops (the ordained male members of the church hierarchy who have, by right of their own office, executive jurisdiction over a building, diocesan territory, or a communal or non-communal group of persons—juridical entities under church law). They receive the vows of the nuns of the abbey; they may admit candidates to their order's novitiate; they may send them to study; and they may send them to do pastoral or missionary, or to work or assist—to the extent allowed by canon and civil law—in the administration and ministry of a parish or diocese (these activities could be inside or outside the community's territory). They have full authority in its administration.

However, there are significant limitations.

- They may not administer the sacraments, whose celebration is reserved to bishops, priests, deacons (clerics), namely, those in Holy Orders.
- They may make provision for an ordained cleric to help train and to admit some of their members, if needed, as altar servers, extraordinary ministers of Holy Communion, or lectors—all ministries which are now open to the unordained.
- They may not serve as a witness to a marriage except by special rescript.
- They may not administer Penance (Reconciliation), Anointing of the Sick (Extreme Unction), or function as an ordained celebrant or concelebrant of the Mass (by virtue of their office and their training and institution, they may act, if the need arises, as altar servers, lectors, ushers, porters, or extraordinary ministers of Holy Communion, and if need be, the Host).
- They may preside over the Liturgy of the Hours which they are obliged to say with their community, speak on Scripture to their community, and give certain types of blessings not reserved to the clergy. On the other hand, they may not ordinarily preach a sermon or homily, nor read the Gospel during Mass.
- As they do not receive episcopal ordination in the Catholic, Orthodox and Oriental Churches, they do not possess the ability to ordain others, nor do they exercise the authority they do possess under canon law over any territories outside of their monastery and its territory (though non-cloistered, non-contemplative female religious members who are based in a convent or monastery but who participate in external affairs may assist as needed by the diocesan bishop and local secular clergy and laity, in certain pastoral ministries and administrative and non-administrative functions not requiring ordained ministry or status as a male cleric in those churches or programs).

There are exigent circumstances, where due to Apostolical privilege, certain abbesses have been granted rights and responsibilities above the normal, such as the abbess of the Cistercian Monastery of the Abbey of Santa María la Real de Las Huelgas near Burgos, Spain. Also granted exceptional rights was the abbess of the Cistercian order in Conversano, Italy. She was granted the ability to appoint her own vicar-general, select and approve the confessors, along with the practice of receiving the public homage of her clergy. This practice continued until some of the duties were modified due to an appeal by the clergy to Rome. Finally in 1750, the public homage was abolished.

During the Middle Ages (7th–10th centuries) in the Catholic Church, greater restrictions on abbesses' spiritual independence gained pace. Instruments of church authority, from papal bulls down to local sanctions, were increasingly used to restrict their freedom to dispense blessings, administer sacraments, including the veiling of nuns, and publicly read the gospels or preach. Such spiritual—and even temporal—authority had in earlier church history, largely been unremarkable. As Thomas Oestereich, contributor to the Catholic Encyclopedia (1913), makes clear, abbesses' past spiritual authority was increasingly seen as the "usurpation" of corresponding priestly power, and a solely male privilege. He gives an example of the attitude toward such practice, from the 9th century, which persists in church administrative control into the modern era:

Thus, in the Capitularies of Charlemagne, mention is made of

certain Abbesses, who contrary to the established discipline of the Church of God, presume to bless the people, impose their hands on them, make the sign of the cross on the foreheads of men, and confer the veil on virgins, employing during that ceremony the blessing reserved exclusively to the priest,

— Louis Thomassin, Vetus et Nova Ecclesae Disciplina, pars I, lib. II, xii, no. 17.

all of which practice the bishops are urged to forbid absolutely in their respective dioceses.

Similarly, in 1210, Innocent III (died 1216) expressed his view of the Cistercian abbesses of Burgos and Palencia in Spain, who preached and heard confessions of their own religious, characterizing these acts as "unheard of, most indecorous, and highly preposterous."

== History ==
Historically, in some Celtic monasteries, abbesses presided over joint-houses of monks and nuns, the most famous example being Saint Brigid of Kildare's leadership in the founding of the monastery at Kildare in Ireland. This custom accompanied Celtic monastic missions to France, Spain, and even to Rome itself. In 1115, Robert, the founder of Fontevraud Abbey near Chinon and Saumur, France, committed the government of the whole order, men as well as women, to a female superior.

In Lutheran churches, the title of abbess (German: Äbtissin) has in some cases survived (for example, in the Itzehoe Convent to designate the heads of abbeys which since the Protestant Reformation have continued as monasteries or convents (German: Stifte). These positions continued, merely changing from Catholic to Lutheran. The first to make this change was the Abbey of Quedlinburg, whose last Catholic abbess died in 1514. These are collegiate foundations, which provide a home and an income for unmarried ladies, generally of noble birth, called canonesses (German: Kanonissinen), or more usually, Stiftsdamen or Kapitularinnen. The office of abbess is of considerable social dignity, and in the past, was sometimes filled by princesses of the reigning houses. Until the dissolution of Holy Roman Empire and mediatisation of smaller imperial fiefs by Napoleon, the evangelical abbess of Quedlinburg was also per officio the head of that reichsunmittelbar state. The last such ruling abbess was Sofia Albertina, Princess of Sweden. The abess Hildegard of Fraunmünster Abbey sat in the Imperial Diet among other princes of the Holy Roman Empire. The oldest women's abbey in Germany is St. Marienthal Abbey of Cistercian nuns, near Ostritz, established during the early 13th century.

In the Hradčany of Prague is a Catholic institute whose mistress is titled an abbess. It was founded in 1755 by the Empress Maria Theresa, and traditionally was responsible for the coronation of the Queen of Bohemia. The abbess is required to be an Austrian archduchess.

In 1997, it was estimated the Catholic Church had around 200 presiding abbesses.

== Abbas placename ==
The word 'Abbas' is used as part of a place name (for example, the English villages of Compton Abbas and Milton Abbas). The name usually relates to land previously owned by an abbess.

== See also ==
- List of abbots and abbesses of Kildare
- Katharina von Zimmern (1478–1547), last abbess of the Fraumünster Abbey

== General and cited references ==
- Fletcher, Adrian (2007). "The Royal Abbey of Fontevraud". Paradox Place. Archived from the original on 5 May 2015.
- Henneberry, Thomas E. (1997). "Abbess". In Johnston, Bernard (ed.). Collier's Encyclopedia. Vol. I: A to Ameland (1st ed.). New York: P. F. Collier. ISBN 1-5716-1093-6. LCCN 96084127.
- Hoiberg, Dale H., ed. (2010). "Abbess". Encyclopædia Britannica. Vol. 1: A-ak Bayes (15th ed.). Chicago: Encyclopædia Britannica, Inc. ISBN 978-0-85229-961-6. LCCN 2002113989.
- Oestreich, Thomas (1913). "Abbess" . In Herbermann, Charles (ed.). Catholic Encyclopedia. New York: Robert Appleton Company. pp. 7–10.
- Rambler, Nash (11 May 2010). "Last of Her Kind: Princess Sophia Albertina of Sweden & Norway". The Esoteric Curiosa.
