= Stadthaus, Zurich =

City hall for Zurich, Switzerland

- Pictured in 2022, with the flag of Ukraine on its mast in support of the country during the Russia–Ukraine War

- Location within Switzerland
- Alternative names: Zurich City Hall

General information
- Architectural style: Renaissance
- Location: Zurich, Switzerland, Stadthausquai
- Coordinates: 47.36927°N 8.54144°E
- Completed: 1884 (142 years ago)
- Owner: Government of Zurich

The Stadthaus is the city hall of Zurich, Switzerland. Built in two stages, beginning in 1883, it stands on Stadthausquai, on the left bank of the Limmat, the river which runs north–south through the city. The Stadthaus is located in Zurich's Altstadt district, immediately south of Münsterbrücke.

== History ==
The building was completed in two stages: firstly, the original, smaller building between 1883 and 1884, then between 1898 and 1900. The latter work was done by Gustav Gull, who was appointed city's builder in 1895. The location chosen was between the old townhouse building and the Fraumünster.

Between 2007 and 2010, the building was extensively renovated for the first time, bringing it up to code for public use. The former main entrance, on Kappelergasse, was reopened.

== Architecture ==
At the external base of the windows are 36 half-figures, 30 centimetres (12 in) tall. The figures were designed by the sculptor Karl Leuch (1871–1915) and represent the urban population at the turn of the 20th century.
