= Münsterhof =

Town square in Zürich, Switzerland

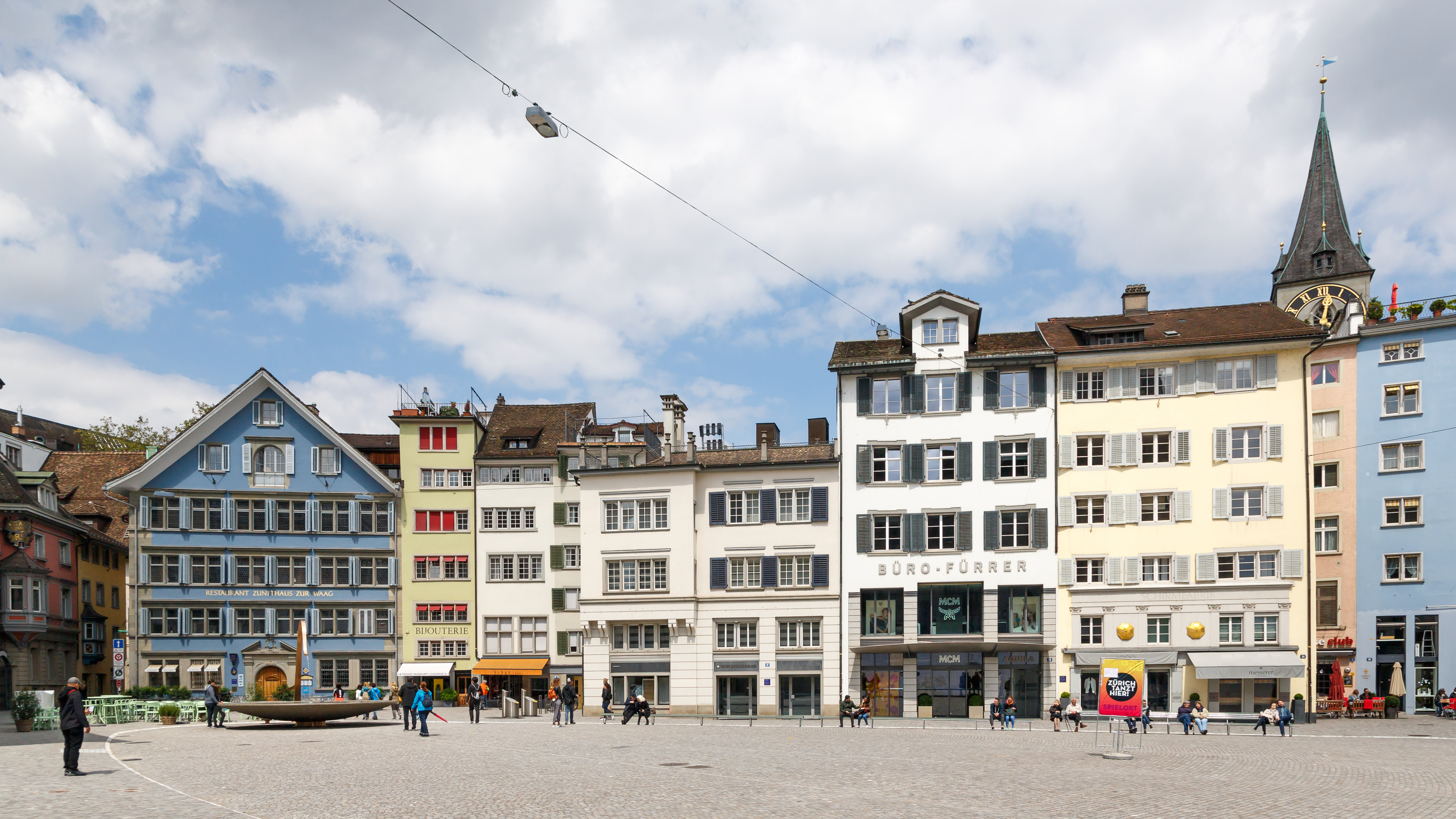
- Looking west across Münsterhof (2022)
- Interactive map of Münsterhof
- Type: town square, parking facility (2015), pedestrian zone (2016)
- Owner: City of Zürich
- Addresses: Münsterhof
- Location: Lindenhof, Zürich, Switzerland
- Postal code: 8001
- Coordinates: 47°22′12.30″N 8°32′27.70″E

Münsterhof (literally: Fraumünster abbey courtyard) is a town square situated in the Lindenhof quarter in the historical centre of Zurich, Switzerland. It is the largest town square within the Altstadt (old town) of Zurich and is surrounded by medieval buildings. The area forms part of the southern extension of the Quaianlagen promenades along Lake Zurich.

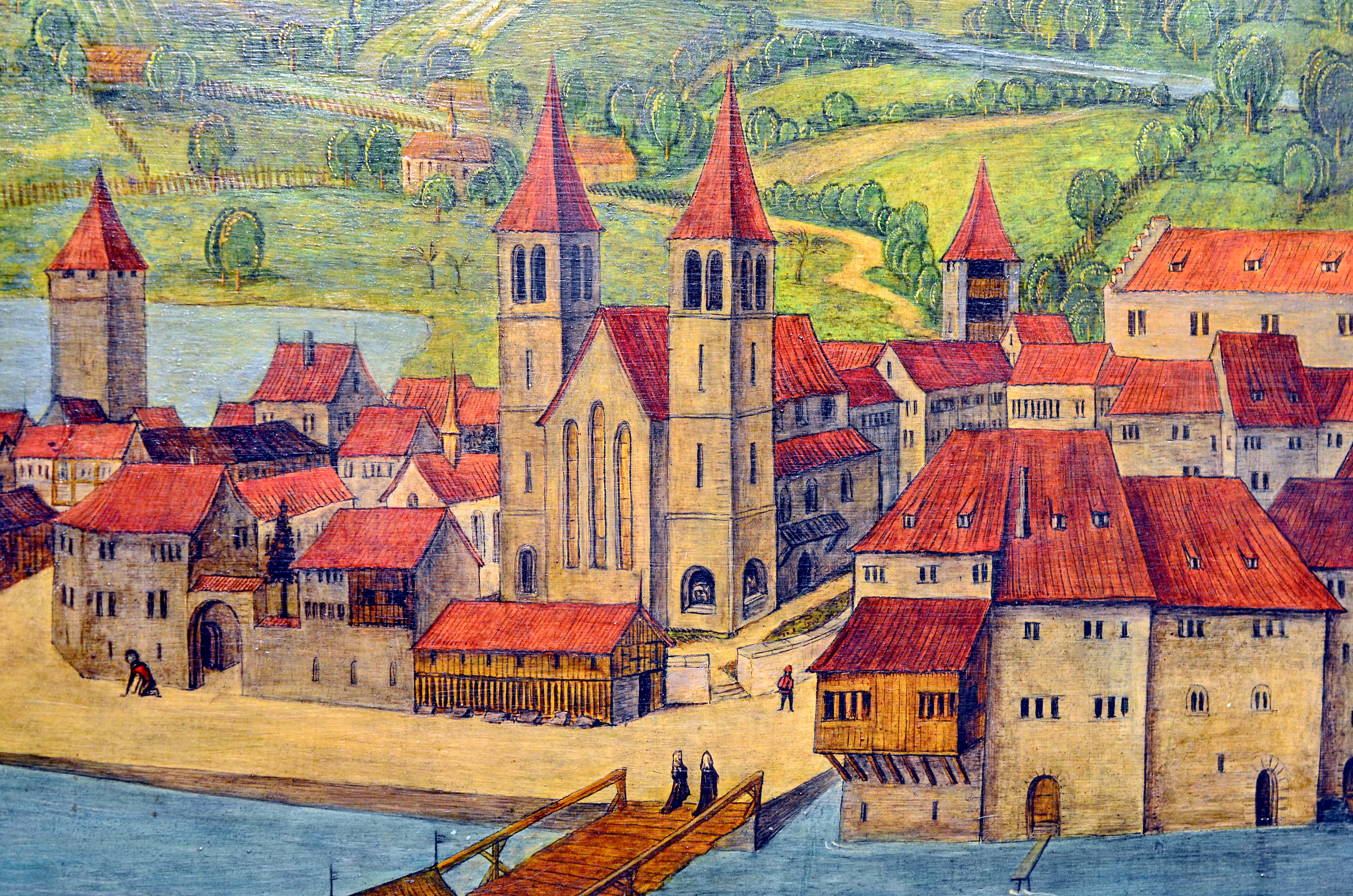
Kratzquartier, Münsterbrücke, Fraumünster and Münsterhof, early 16th century, Hans Leu the Elder

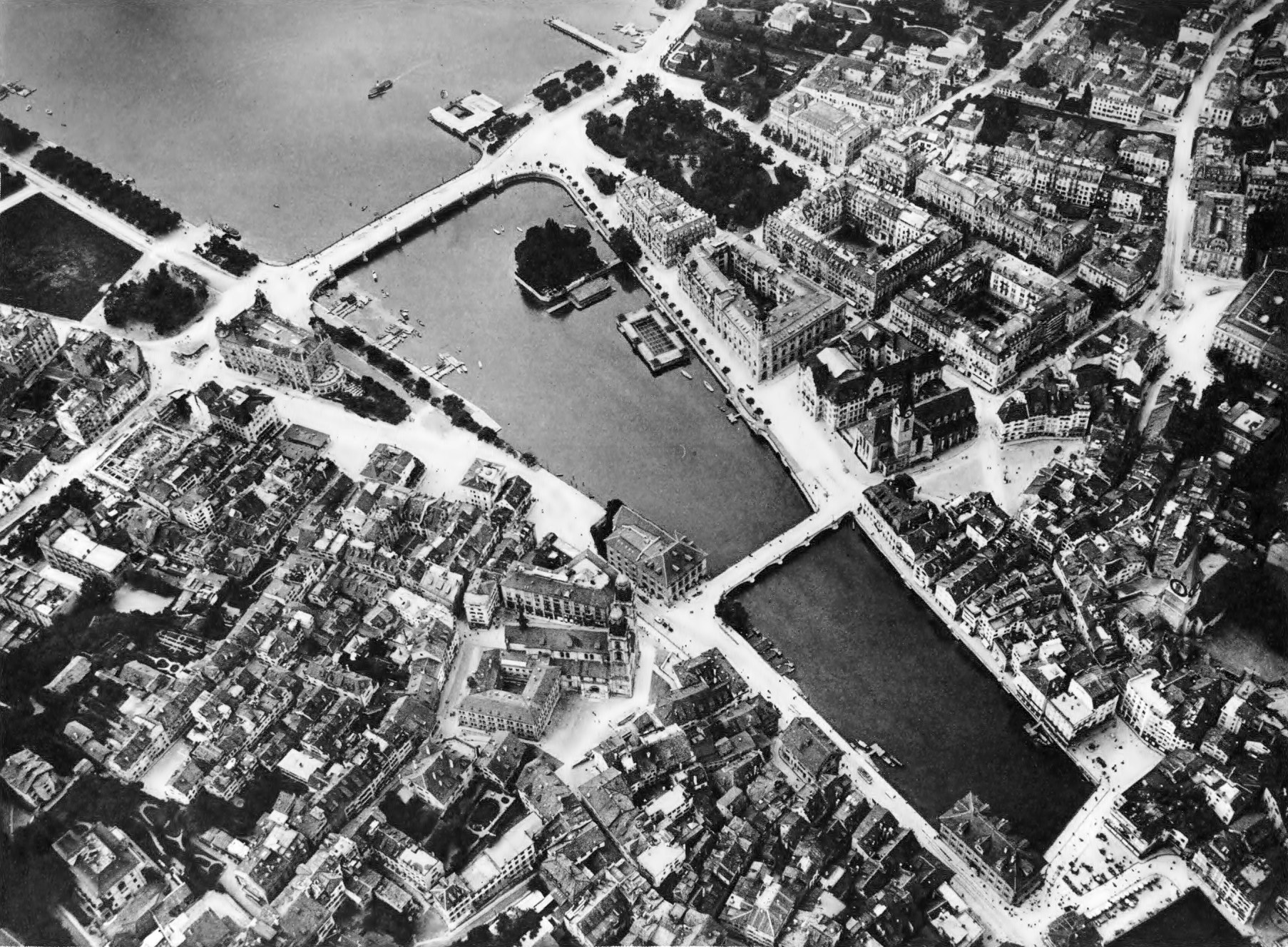
Limmatquai and Quaianlagen: Bellevueplatz and Bürkliplatz, Quaibrücke, Bauschänzli, Stadthausquai, Münsterbrücke and Münsterhof, and Rathausbrücke–Weinplatz, aerial photography by Eduard Spelterini c. 1895

== Geography ==
Münsterhof is located in front of the Fraumünster and lies a short distance from the Münsterbrücke, a bridge which leads eastwards across the river Limmat to the Limmatquai and Grossmünster beyond. It is surrounded by medieval buildings, among which are several guild houses, including Zunfthaus zur Waag, the former Kämbel guild house and the art museum Zunfthaus zur Meisen. This area forms part of the southern extension of the Quaianlagen promenades which were built between 1881 and 1887.

Münsterhof is the largest town square within the former medieval town walls of Zurich. It is part of the historical core of the medieval town, previously the Celtic-Roman "Turicum".

== Transportation ==
Public transport from this area includes the Zurich tram lines 2, 4 and 15, as well as the Zurichsee-Schifffahrtsgesellschaft (ZSG) and its Limmat river tour boats towards Zurichhorn. Automobile transportation is limited because the area is part of the pedestrian zone of Zurich. It is limited to road transport use between lower Limmatquai and Bellevueplatz, upstream on the Limmat. Since 25 September 2004, the driving of motor vehicles, motorcycles and scooters is restricted, except for goods deliveries, police vehicles, postal delivery services, medical doctors and emergency services.

== Sights and activities ==
The main sights are the Fraumünster (first mentioned in 853 AD) and art museum Zunfthaus zur Meisen, which houses the porcelain and faience collection of the Swiss National Museum. There are restaurants and cafés at Münsterhof, including Zunfthaus zur Waag and Zeughauskeller.

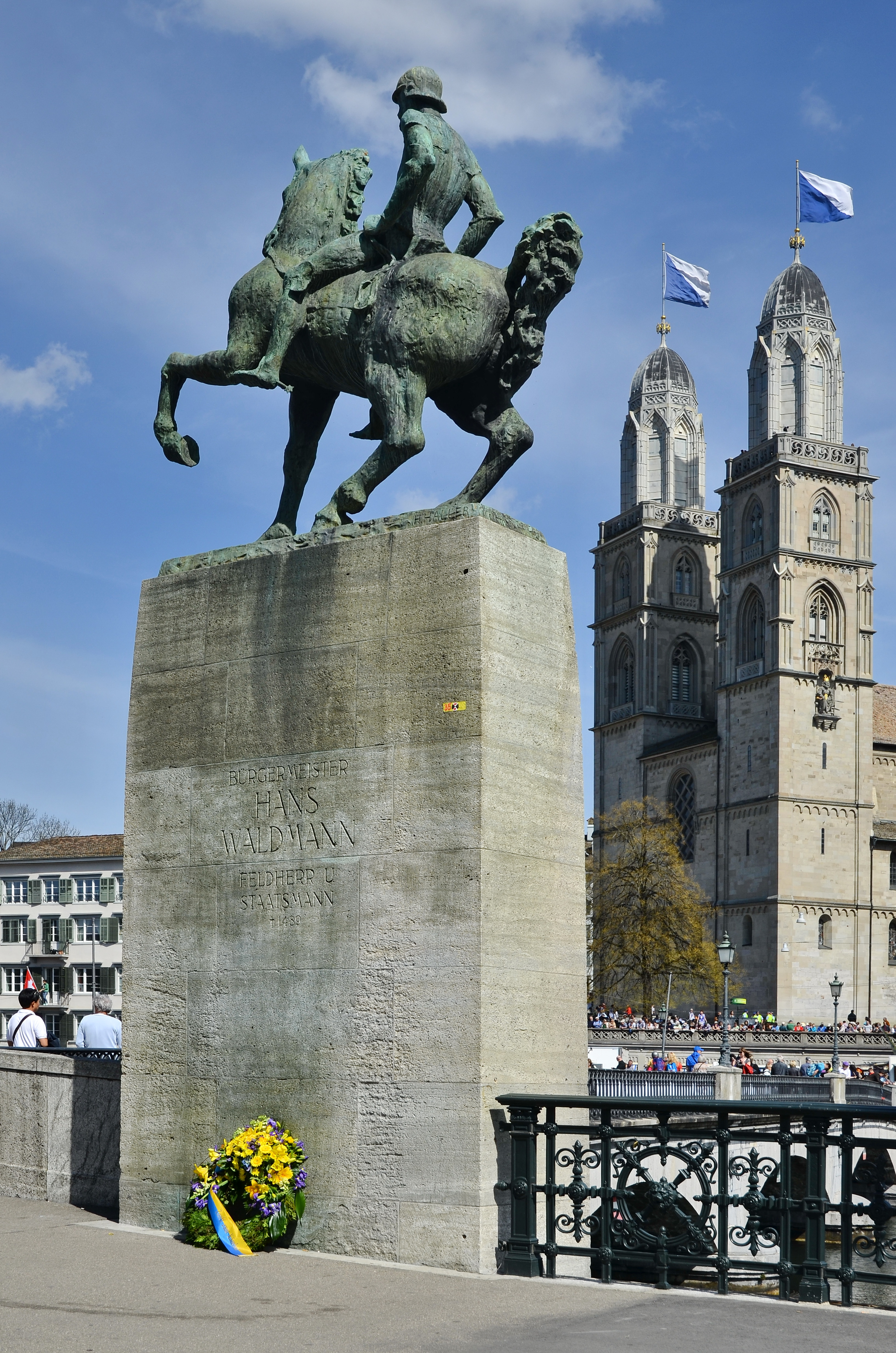
Hans Waldmann monument on occasion of the Sechseläuten-Kämbel ceremony 2015

The equestrian monument in front of the Fraumünster at Münsterbrücke was created by Hermann Haller. It was unveiled on 6 April 1937 by the Kämbel guild, aiming to rehabilitate Hans Waldmann, mayor of Zurich from 1482 to 1489 and their former dean, who they proposed had been the victim of a judicial murder. The equestrian statue became the subject of controversy for artistic, political and historical reasons.

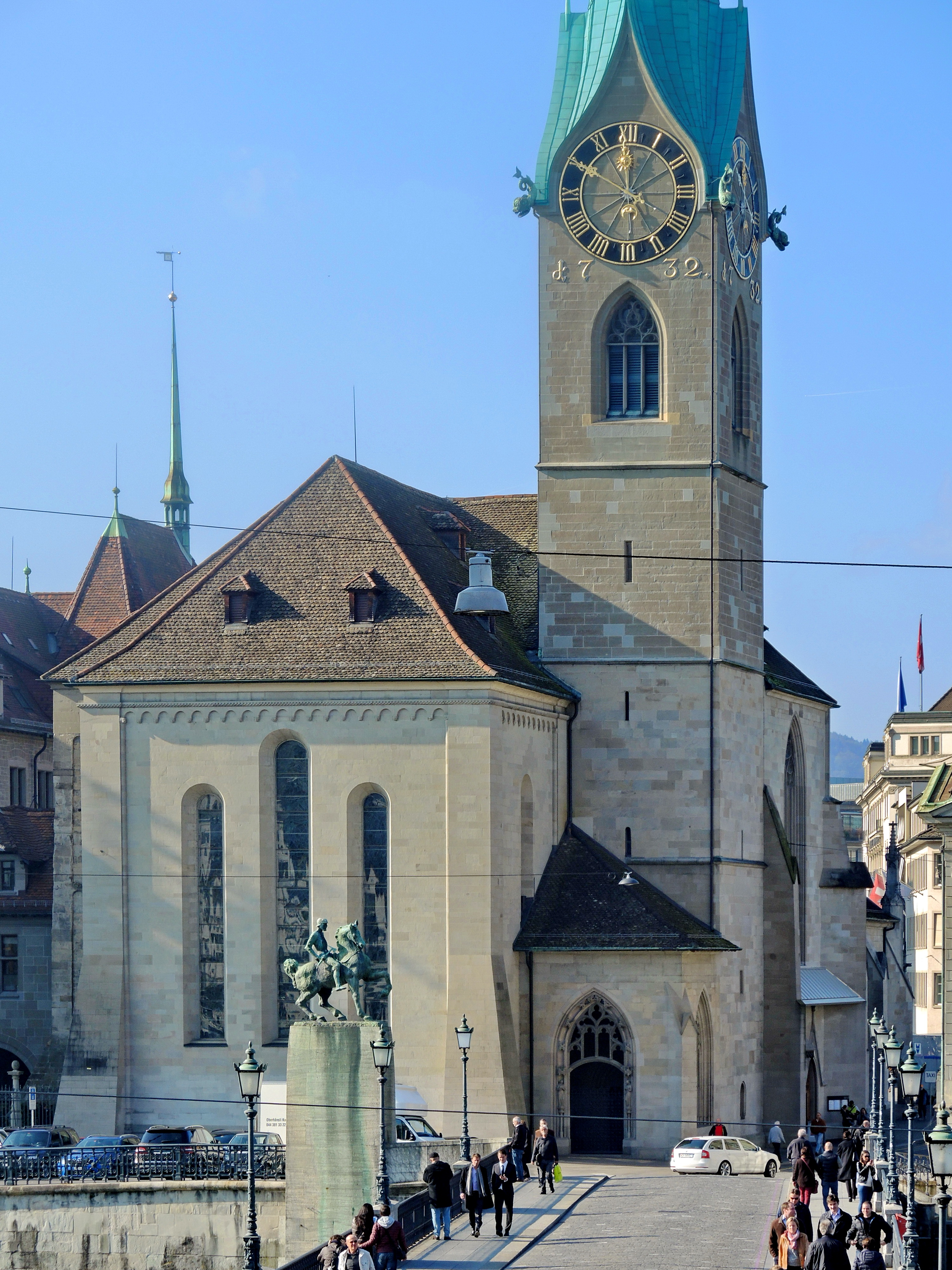
Fraumünster church and its courtyard as seen from the Limmatquai

On 14 March 2004, the Katharina von Zimmern memorial was inaugurated at the former cloister of the Fraumünster Abbey, initiated by the Gesellschaft zu Fraumünster. Anna-Maria Bauer, a sculptor from Zurich, created a sculpture that consists of 37 copper blocks that are layered into a compact square. The shape of the sculpture refers to the shape of an altar table or burial and shines in its simplicity as a symbol of timelessness, to remember the last princess Abbess's decision that enabled the peaceful introduction of the Reformation in Zurich on 8 December 1524.

On the ground floor of the cloister a banner is engraved: "Die Stadt vor Unruhe und Umgemach bewahren und tun, was Zurich lieb und dienlich ist." (English: To preserve the city of riots and misfortune, and to do what is nice and helpful to the city of Zurich.) These were the words of Katharina von Zimmern on occasion of the surrender of the Fraumünster Abbey to the city's magistrates during the Reformation in Zurich.

Frescoes by Paul Bodmer depicting the history of the abbey are located in the cloister and attract numerous visitors.

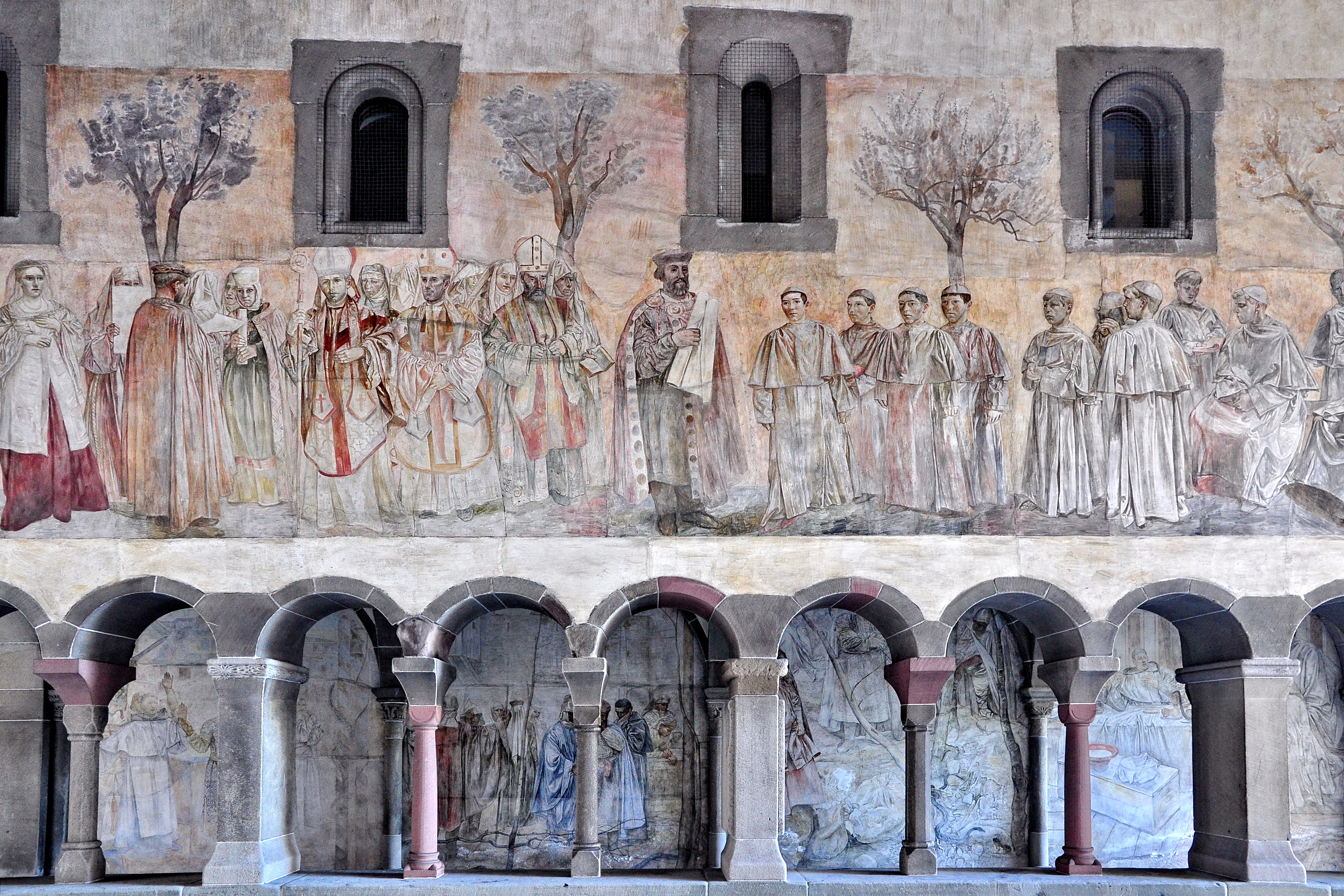
Frescos by Paul Bodmer in the cloister of Fraumünster

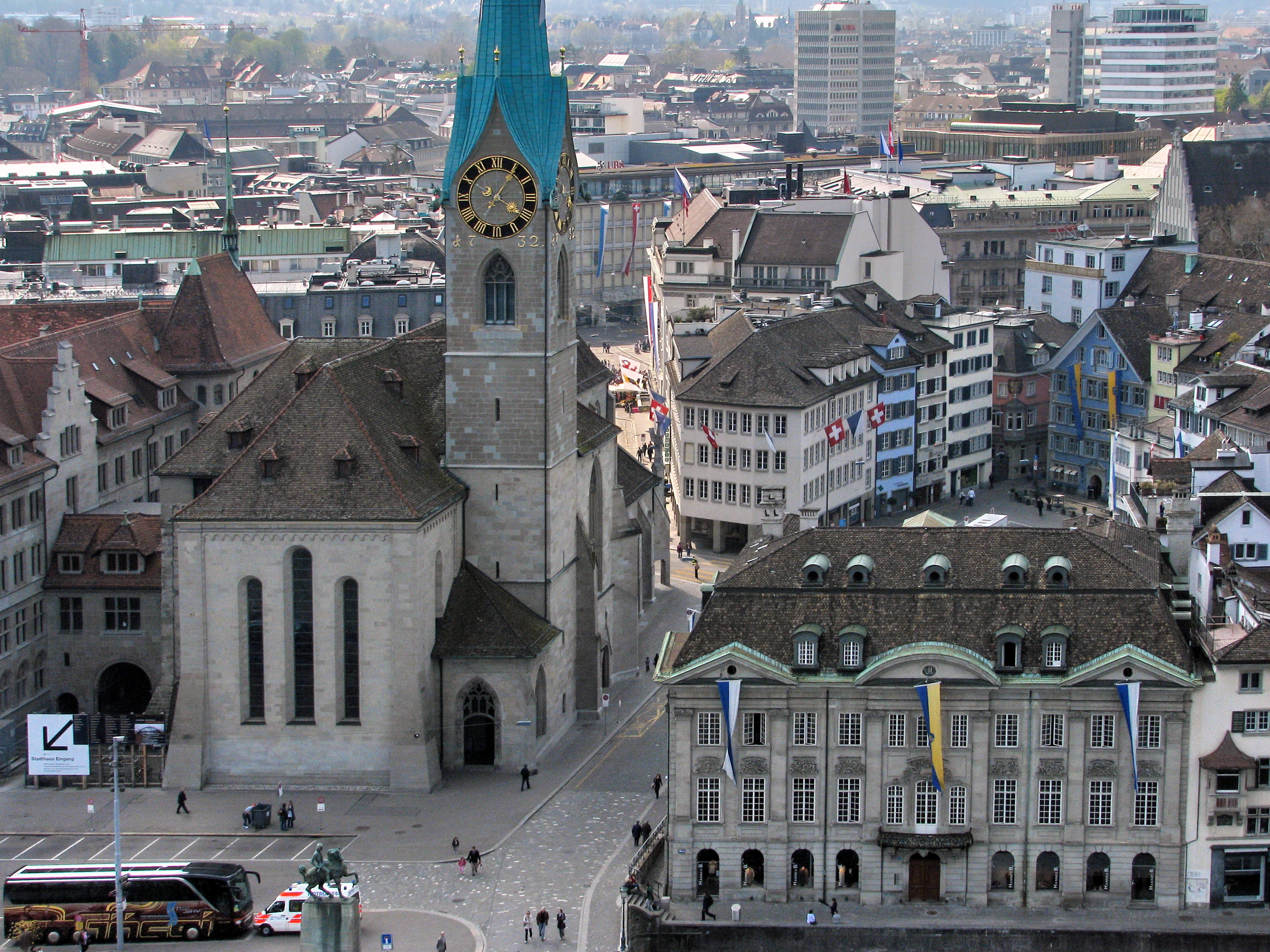
Fraumünster, Münsterhof and Zunfthaus zur Meisen as seen from Grossmünster

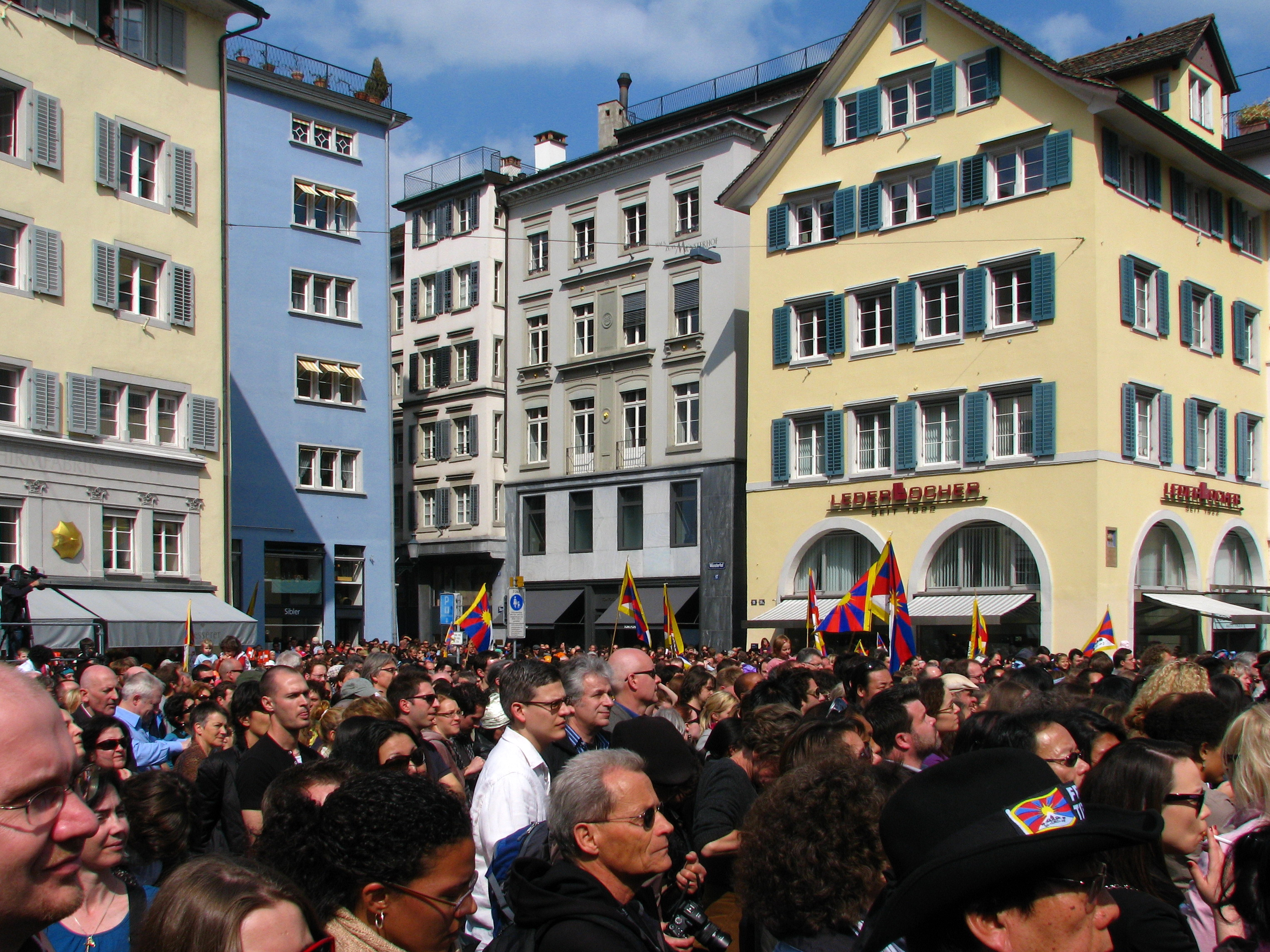
Former Kämbel guild house on occasion of a visit by HH 14th Dalai Lama, organised by Wangpo Thetong in April 2010

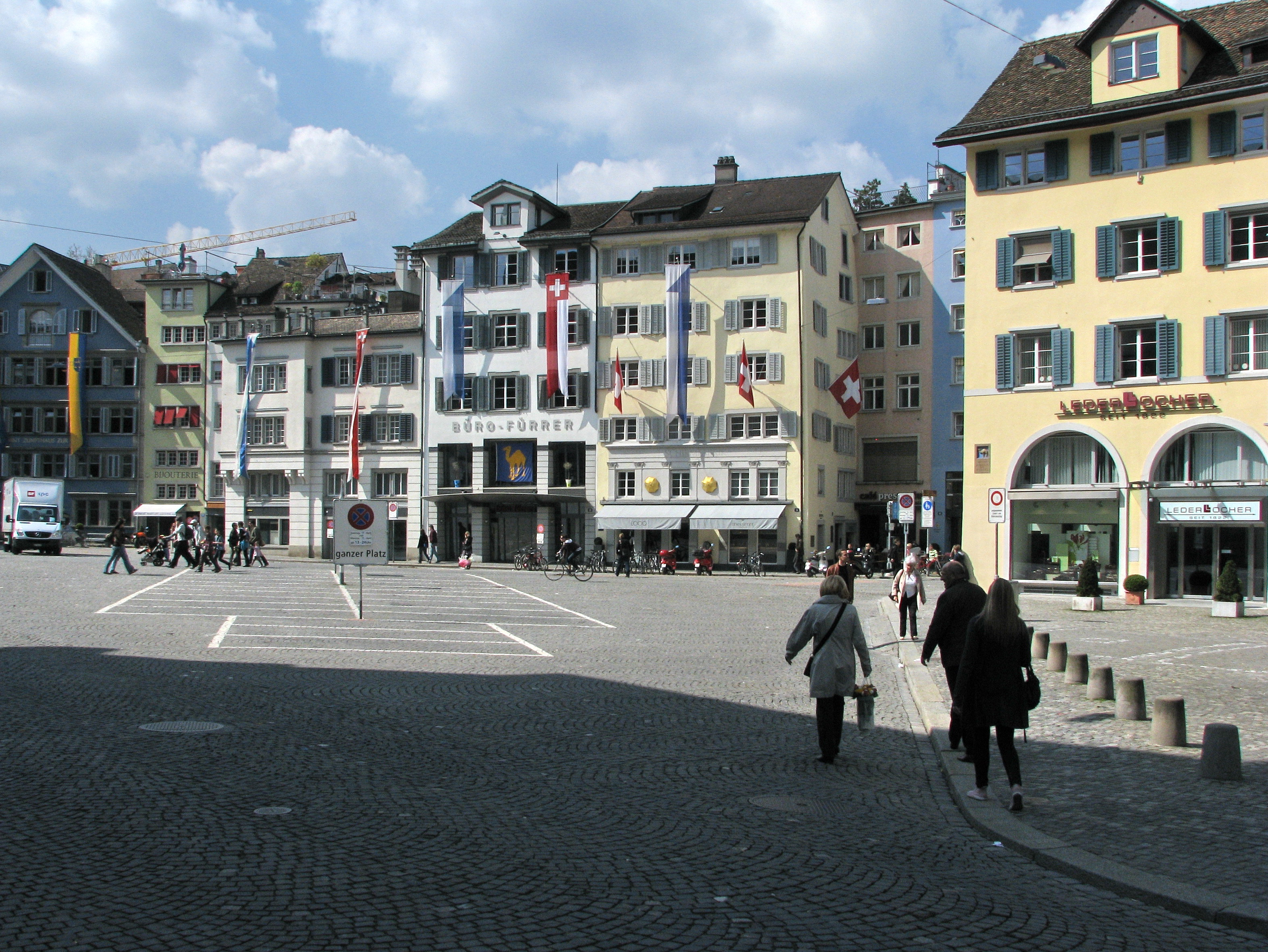
As seen from Fraumünster church

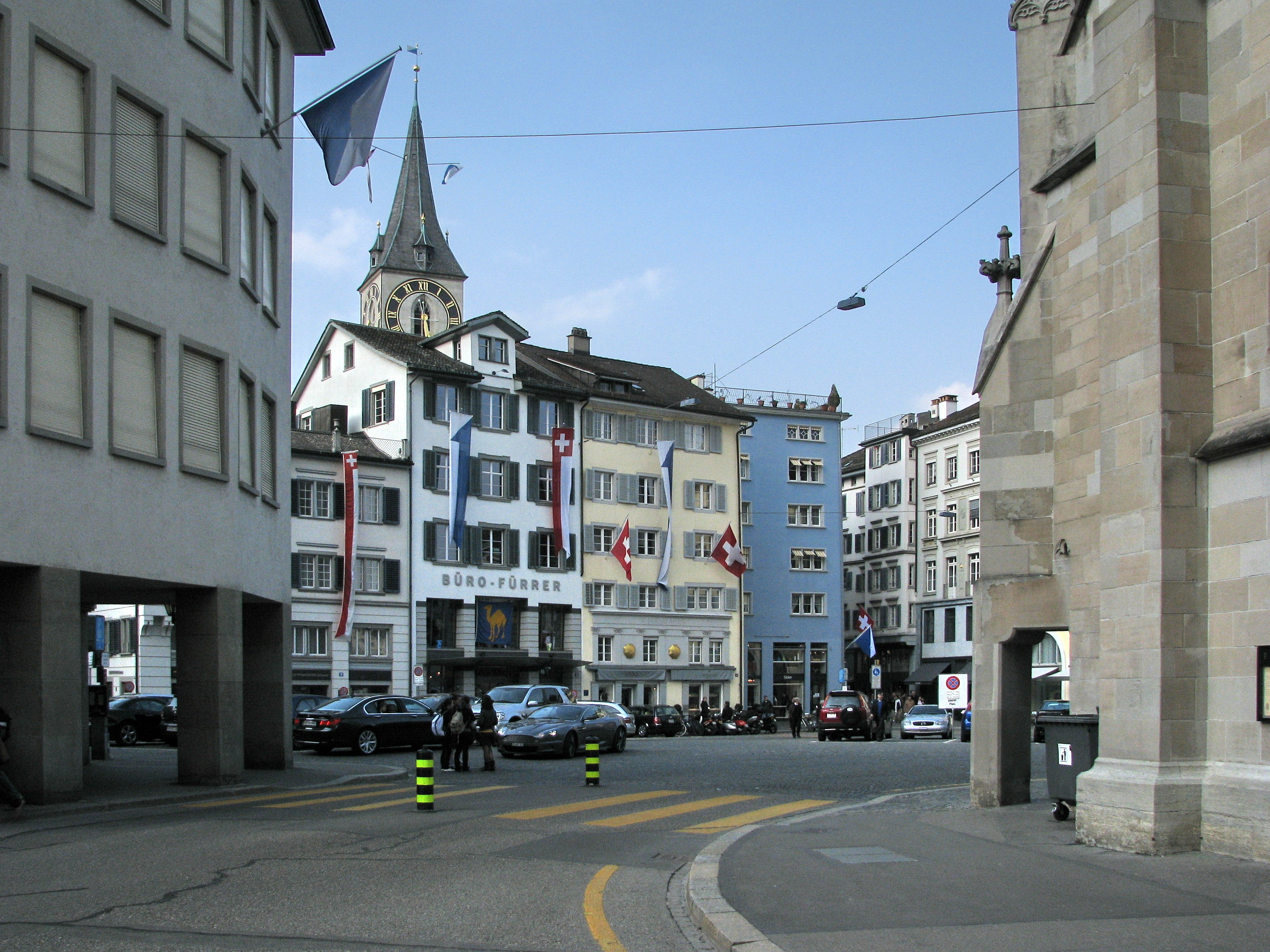
As seen from Poststrasse

Beginning in 1999, Gesellschaft zu Fraumünster (Fraumünster society) organised every three years the Mittelalter Spectaculum, a medieval funfair, in Münsterhof.

== Redesign of the Münsterhof plaza ==
The city's authorities planned from May 2003 to declare Münsterhof a car-free zone, and evaluations were made to improve public use of the historical urban square for open-air performances and other public events. Construction work, beginning in 2014, was scheduled to be completed in 2015, but was delayed to 2016 due to archaeological excavations in the winter of 2014–15 and from October to November 2015.

The redesign includes a distinctive new fountain, 6 metres (20 ft) in diameter and almost 4 metres (13 ft) tall, as a central element. A smaller drinking-water fountain is to be connected directly to that central water basin. A new granite stone pavement with contrasting patterns visually divides the plaza into an inner and an outer area. New steel lighting fixtures enable a warm visual atmosphere. Benches are to be added, and more space for outdoor cafés and restaurants. All structures are to meet the requirements for barrier-free construction and be accessible to physically disabled people.

With this transformation, Münsterhof would no longer be used for parking, which will be restricted to Fraumünstertrasse and Parking Opéra. Once work is finished, the plaza is to again be a representative and lively urban square in the heart of historical Zurich, available in its entirety for major events. The focus, however, will be on everyday use. The present (as of October 2015) construction works will result in minimal physical design changes, but the city's authorities claim "they will nonetheless enhance the square significantly" and create a "transformation into a tranquil open space which invites everyone to take a stroll or simply relax."

== History ==
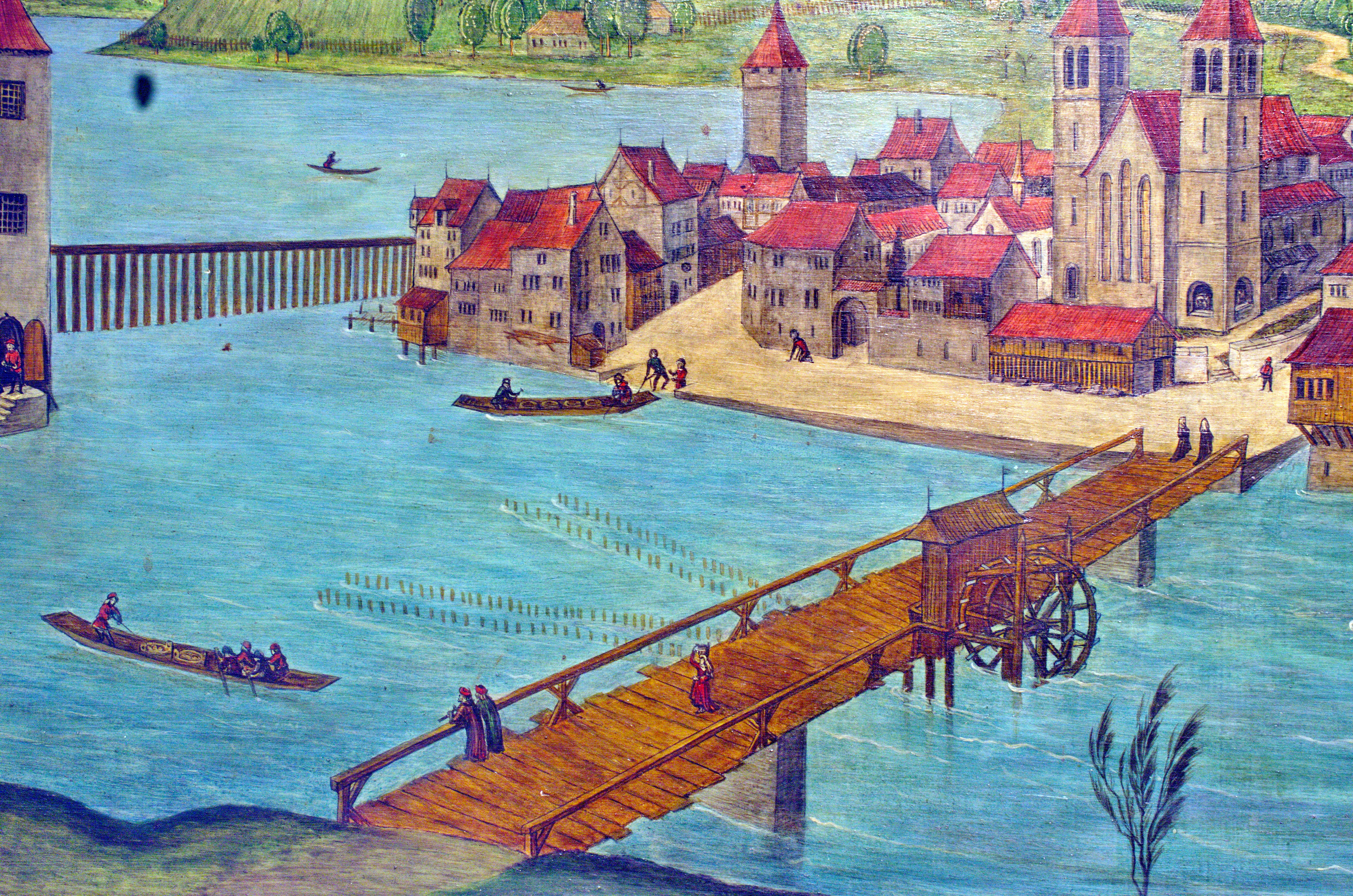
Münsterhof, Fraumünster and the medieval upper Limmat bridge on Hans Leu's view of Zurich, c. 1500

While in prehistoric times the Münsterhof area was a swampy hollow, flooded by the river Sihl, Lindenhof hill was the core of the Helvetii (Oppidum Lindenhof) and Roman (Vicus Turicum) settlement, upon which the modern city has grown, expanding along the easterly Limmat riverbank. Roman buildings were likely built at the site of the Zunfthaus zur Zimmerleuten on the other riverbank, and the Roman settlement may have stretched towards the present Münsterbrücke, crossing the Limmat between Grossmünster (remains of graves) and Wasserkirche, and the present-day Münsterhof plaza. Suggested by historians and recent archaeological evidence uncovered during construction at Münsterbrücke, the present Weinplatz square may have been the site of the civilian harbour of the Celtic-Roman Turicum. Firebed tombs from the 1st century AD were found at Poststrasse, west of the Fraumünster church; northeast of the church, a round pit from the 2nd or 3rd century AD was discovered with numerous pottery shards. The human remains of a large 7th-century cemetery at Münsterhof were secured in October–November 2015. Probably in the 10th century wooden houses were built by Zurich citizens beside the Fraumünster Abbey, and mansions made of stone may have been built in the early 13th century.

First mentioned in 1221 respectively 1303 AD, Münsterhof was for centuries the only proper square within the medieval town walls. From the Middle Ages onwards, it often served as a place to stage important political and cultural events for a larger audience. It is where the German king and his retinue were formally welcomed by the abbess of the Fraumünster abbey. She was also an acting princess of the Holy German Empire and, up to the time of the Reformation in Zurich, the formal ruler of Zurich. The plaza probably became an open square around 1300 AD when the monastic graveyard was abandoned (except for the narrow strip beside the abbey). At the same time, the demolition of the adjoining St. James chapel (in German: Jakobskapelle), as well as a number of houses, was probably carried out on the orders of the princess abbess. In medieval times the bailiff's house of the Einsiedeln Abbey was also located at Münsterhof, and the plaza became the preferred domicile of the abbey's associates.

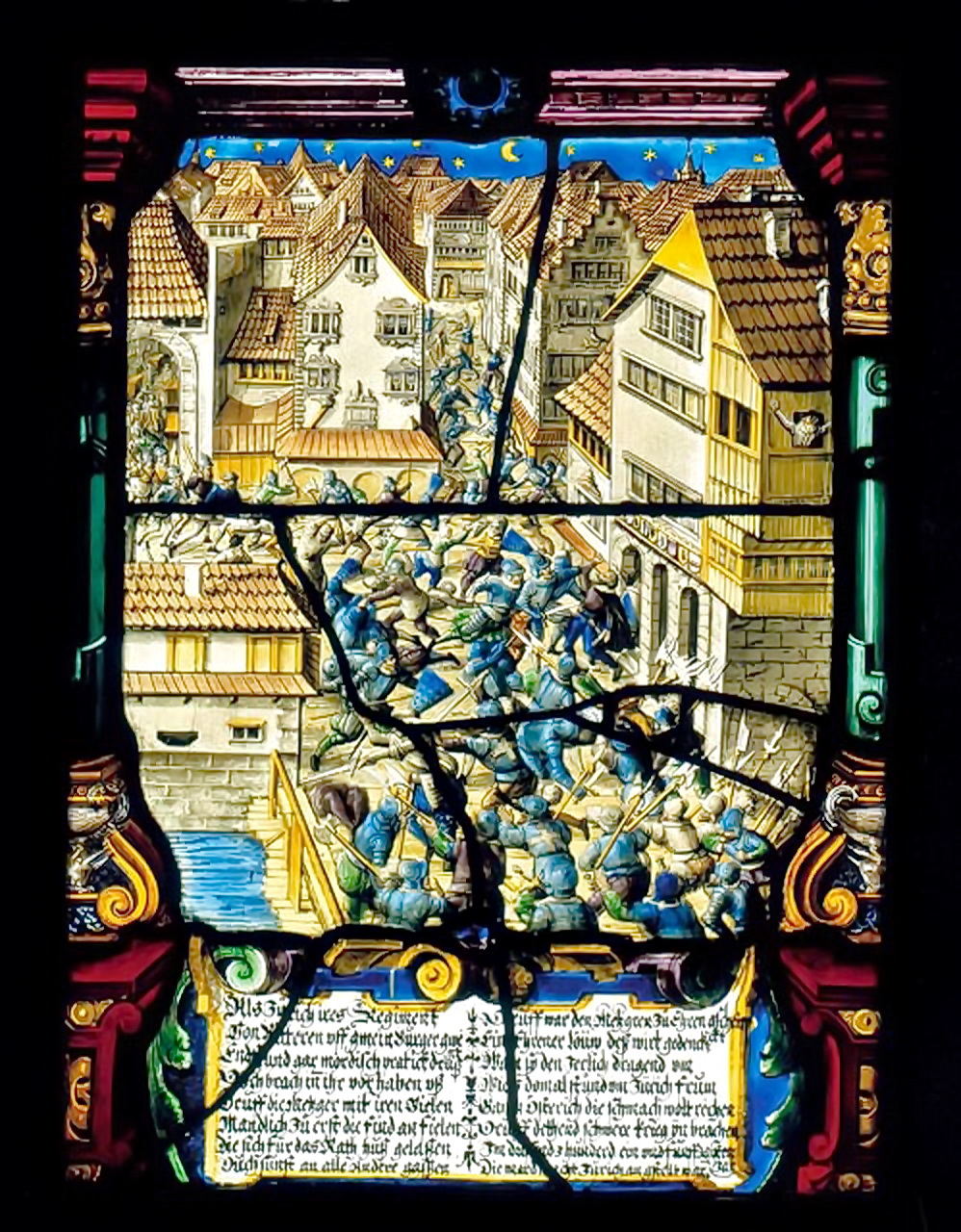
17th-century glass painting showing the "Mordnacht von Zurich" on 23–24 February 1350

On 18 July 1336, Rudolf Brun defeated his political opponents in the Rat (council) of Zurich; these banned members found refuge with Count Johann I in Rapperswil. The so-called Äusseres Zurich, meaning the banned councilors, declared a feud (German: Fehde) and formed a coalition, and Johann I became the leader of Brun's opposition, including the ancient councilor family Bilgeri. On 21 September 1337, Zurich troops moved over the Obersee to the Grynau Castle where Johann I was killed. Count Johann I's underaged children – Johann II, Rudolf, Gotfrid and Agnes – were set under guardianship of Albrecht, Duke of Austria. The feud was continued by Johann II in the late 1340s, and an attempted coup by Brun's opposition was forcefully put down after intensive street fights around Münsterhof plaza on 23–24 February 1350. Count Johann II was arrested for two years, Rapperswil and its castle were destroyed by the Zurich troops, and Brun's opponents executed or banned. After the intervention of Habsburg-Austria against Zurich, a peace treaty was signed in 1352.

In 1504 AD, and probably much earlier, the passion play of the city's martyrs Felix and Regula was celebrated in the plaza. On 8 December 1524, on the day of the Immaculate Conception, Katharina von Zimmern, the imperial abbess of Zurich, passed the abbey and all rights to the council of Zurich. Following the Reformation in Zurich, the area was used as a pig market until 1667. In 1676, the town square was renewed and paved with cobblestones. From 1627 to 1835, stalls were situated along the north wall of Fraumünster.

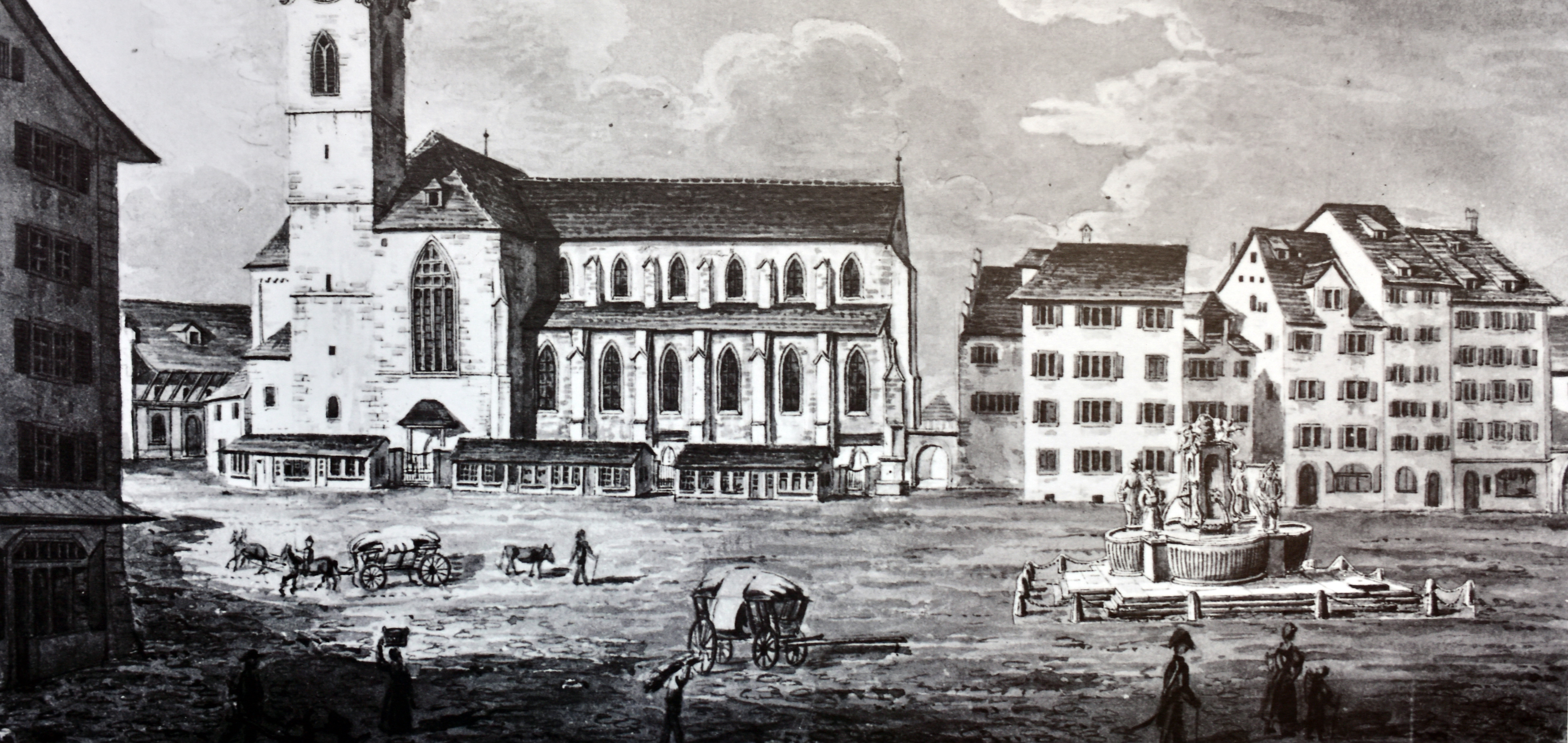
Münsterhof and Neptun fountain (demolished in 1811), drawing by Emil Schulthess, c. 1835

In 1766, the Neptun fountain adorned Münsterhof plaza, but was removed 45 years later. During Züriputsch in September 1839, several thousand putschists stormed the city from the west, and fought the cantonal troops in the alleys between Paradeplatz and Münsterhof. In 1938, the plaza was rebuilt at its south-westerly side towards Poststrasse as it is today, now mainly being a parking facility nearby the pedestrian zones at Bahnhofstrasse, Paradeplatz and Limmatquai.

== Archaeological excavations ==
Dölf Wild, chief archaeologist of the 2014–15 excavations, told in an interview: "For 700 years, Münsterhof was the stage of large gatherings, and will it soon be again, after a rather sad interlude as [a] parking facility." The archaeological excavations of winter 2014–15 were concentrated on the plaza and on the Stadthausquai and Poststrasse areas; the remains of the cemetery chapel of the era before 1300 AD have been examined (the chapel had been removed and the cemetery reduced when a new gothic church building was erected). The Zurich archaeologists also secured grave furnishings, which will be presented along with the findings of the excavations in 1977–78 as part of an "archaeological window" into the Fraumünster's crypt. In 2015, the city archaeologists (Amt für Städtebau) also identified a 600-year-old badge of Charlemagne on his horse discovering the graves of the martyrs Felix and Regula. The beautifully cast figure is made of non-ferrous metals, measures just 3.5 centimetres (1.4 in), and is believed to have been a pilgrim badge.

In addition to the firebed tombs from the 1st century AD at Poststrasse, west of the Fraumünster, a round pit from the 2nd or 3rd century was discovered northeast of the church, with numerous shards mainly of drinking cups and bowls. In October 2015, the remains of about 280 buried people were secured from the abandoned 7th century cemetery; they are stored temporarily at the Sihlfeld cemetery for scientific research, while a final resting place is sought for a mass grave.
