= Fraumünster =

Church in Zurich, Switzerland

Coordinates: 47°22′11″N 8°32′28″E

Imperial Abbey of Fraumünster Reichskloster Fraumünster
- 853–1524
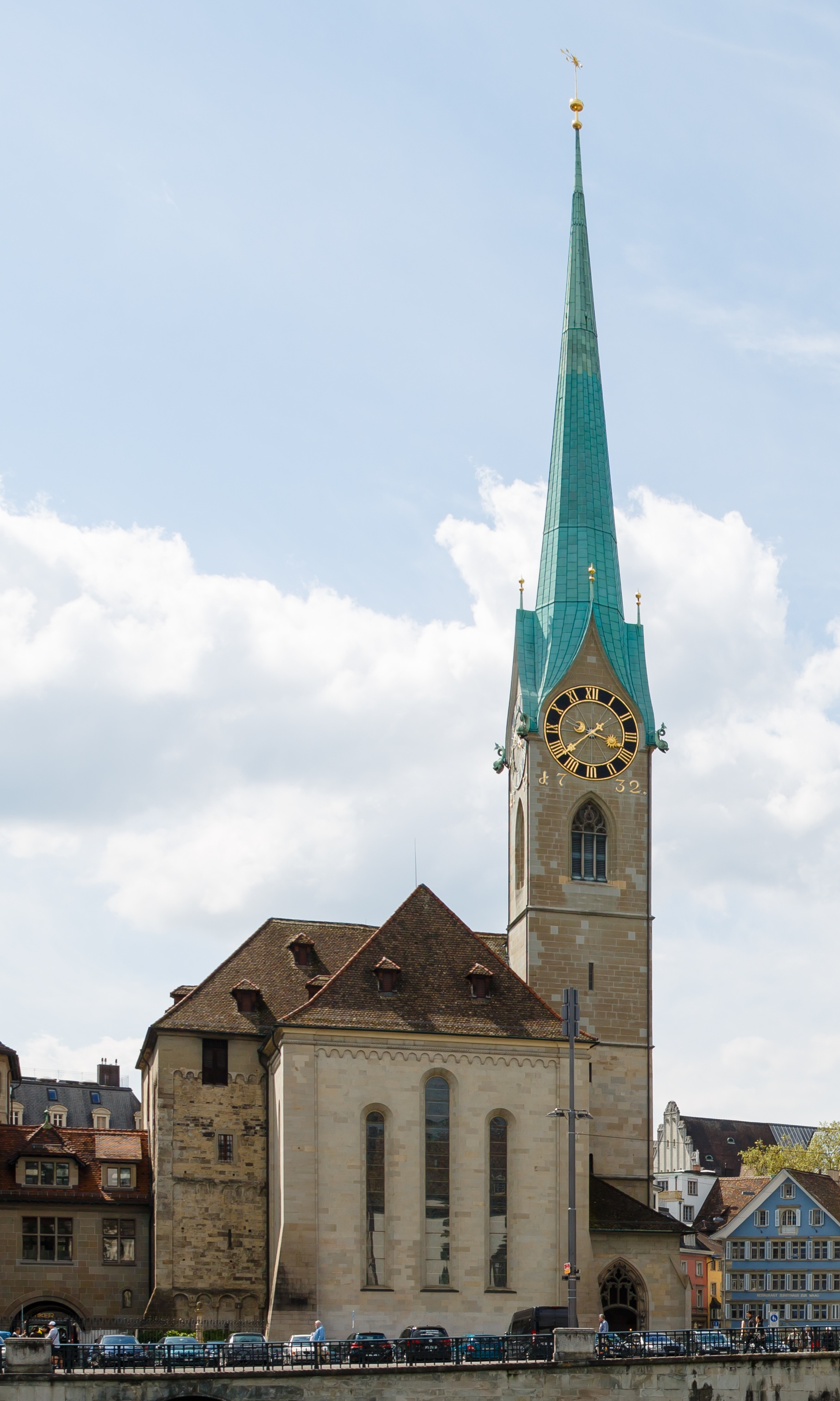
- The Fraumünster
- Status: Imperial Abbey
- Capital: Fraumünster Abbey
- Common languages: High Alemannic
- Government: Theocracy
- Historical era: Middle Ages
  - Founded by Louis the German: 21 July 853
  - Granted market, toll and minting rights by Henry III: 1045
  - Imp. immediacy confirmed by Frederick II: 1218
  - Rudolf Brun indep. mayor, established guild laws: 1336
  - Dissolved in Zwinglian Reforms: 30 November 1524
  - Buildings destroyed: 1898
Preceded by	Succeeded by
Alamannia; Reichenau Abbey	Old Swiss Confederacy
- Today part of: Switzerland

The Fraumünster (German pronunciation: [fʁaʊ̯ˈmʏnstɐ]; lit. in English: Women's Minster) is a church in Zurich, Switzerland, which was built on the remains of a former abbey for aristocratic women and which was founded in 853 by Louis the German for his daughter Hildegard. He endowed the Benedictine convent with the lands of Zurich, Uri, and the Albis forest, and granted the convent immunity, placing it under his direct authority. Today, it belongs to the Evangelical Reformed Church of the canton of Zurich and is one of the four main churches of Zürich, the others being the Grossmünster, Prediger and St. Peter's churches.

== History ==
In 1045, King Henry III granted the convent the right to hold markets, collect tolls, and mint coins, and thus effectively made the abbess the ruler of the city.

Emperor Frederick II granted the abbey Reichsunmittelbarkeit in 1218, thus making it territorially independent of all authority save that of the Emperor himself, and increasing the political power of the abbess. The abbess assigned the mayor, and she frequently delegated the minting of coins to citizens of the city. A famous abbess during this time of great power was Elisabeth of Wetzikon.

However, the political power of the convent slowly waned in the fourteenth century, beginning with the establishment of the Zunftordnung (guild laws) in 1336 by Rudolf Brun, who also became the first independent mayor, i.e. not assigned by the abbess.

The abbey was dissolved on 30 November 1524 in the course of the reformation of Huldrych Zwingli, supported by the last abbess, Katharina von Zimmern.

The monastery buildings were destroyed in 1898 to make room for the new Stadthaus. The church building today serves as the parish church for one of the city's 34 reformed parishes. Münsterhof, historically the main square and marketplace of the medieval city, is named for the abbey. Gesellschaft zu Fraumünster cultivates the traditions of the former nunnery convent.

== Chagall windows ==
The choir of the abbey includes 5 large stained glass windows designed by artist Marc Chagall and installed in 1970. Each of the 5 has a dominant color and depicts a Biblical story. From left (northern wall) to right, the 5 works are:

- Prophets, depicting Elijah's ascent to heaven
- Jacob, displaying his combat, and dreams of heaven
- Christ, illustrating various scenes of Christ's life
- Zion, showing an angel trumpeting the end of the world
- Law, with Moses looking down upon the suffering of his people

Equally impressive is the 9m tall stained glass of the North transept, created by Augusto Giacometti in 1940.

== Fraumünster's Crypt museum ==
Since the last renovation in 1900, the crypt under the choir of the Fraumünster abbey was sealed, and has made public since 19 June 2016. The oldest part of the church preserved the abbey's Holy Relics until the Reformation in Zürich banned the Roman Catholic veneration of saints. The foundations of the crypt date back to the 9th century when the abbey was founded. The crypt also comprises an exhibition on the history of the Reformation in Zürich, on the architecture and local history, assisted by a multimedia information system that illustrates the foundation fragments of the crypt, and how the church was rebuilt from the original Romanesque construction phase to its present Gothic appearance, on occasion of its establishment guided by Dölf Wild, the archaeologist in charge.

== Facilities ==
For the around 500,000 visitors every year a new developed visitor management started in June 2016. Visitors groups up to 60 persons are admitted from June 20 only by appointment and only in defined time windows. Guided tours are allowed only in a "whisper" modus, and by accredited tour guides, from 10 am to 4 pm in winter, and to 5 pm and 6 pm in spring respectively summer.

== The organ ==
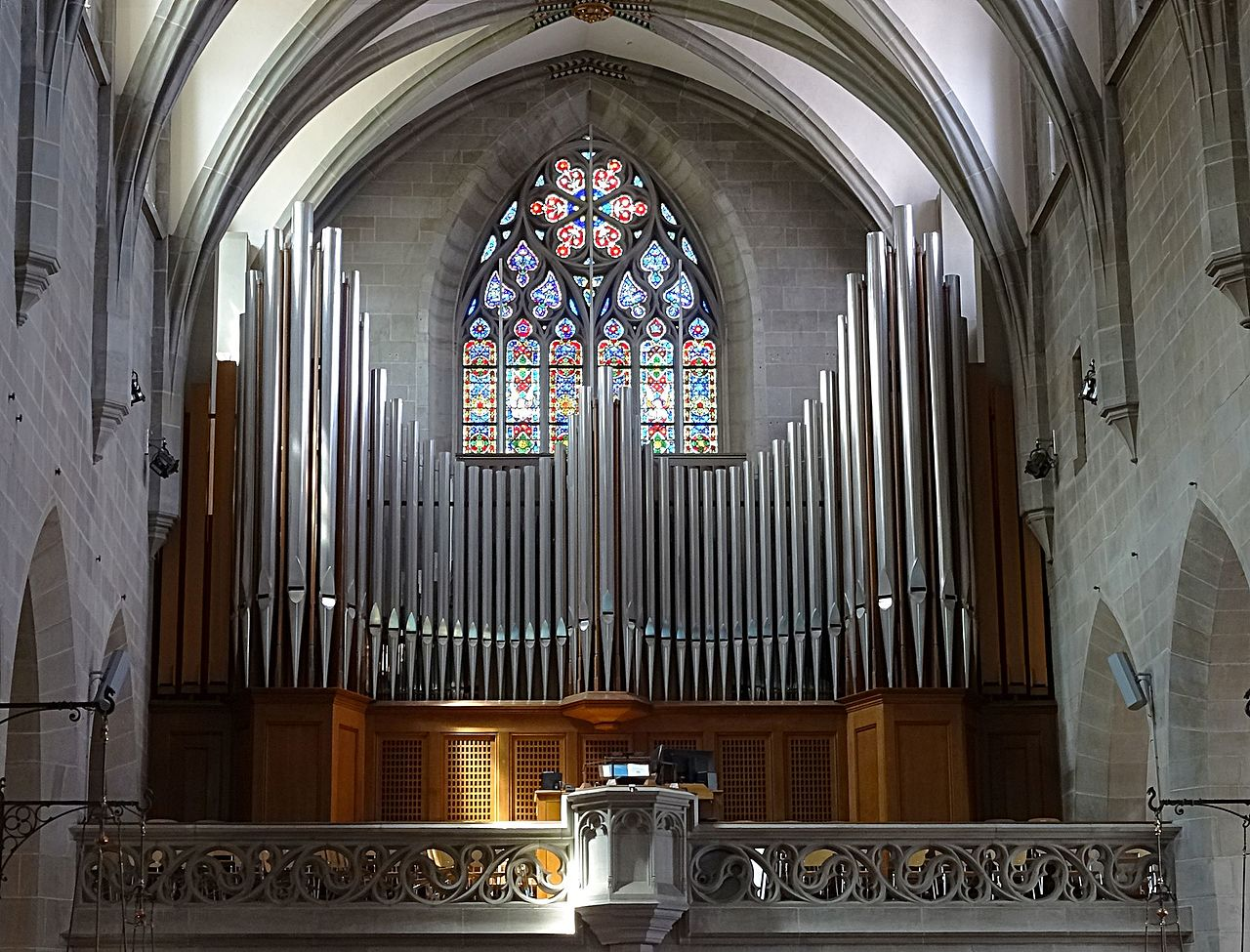
The organ at Fraumünster

With 6,959 pipes, the organ at Fraumünster is the largest in the canton of Zurich.

== Gallery ==
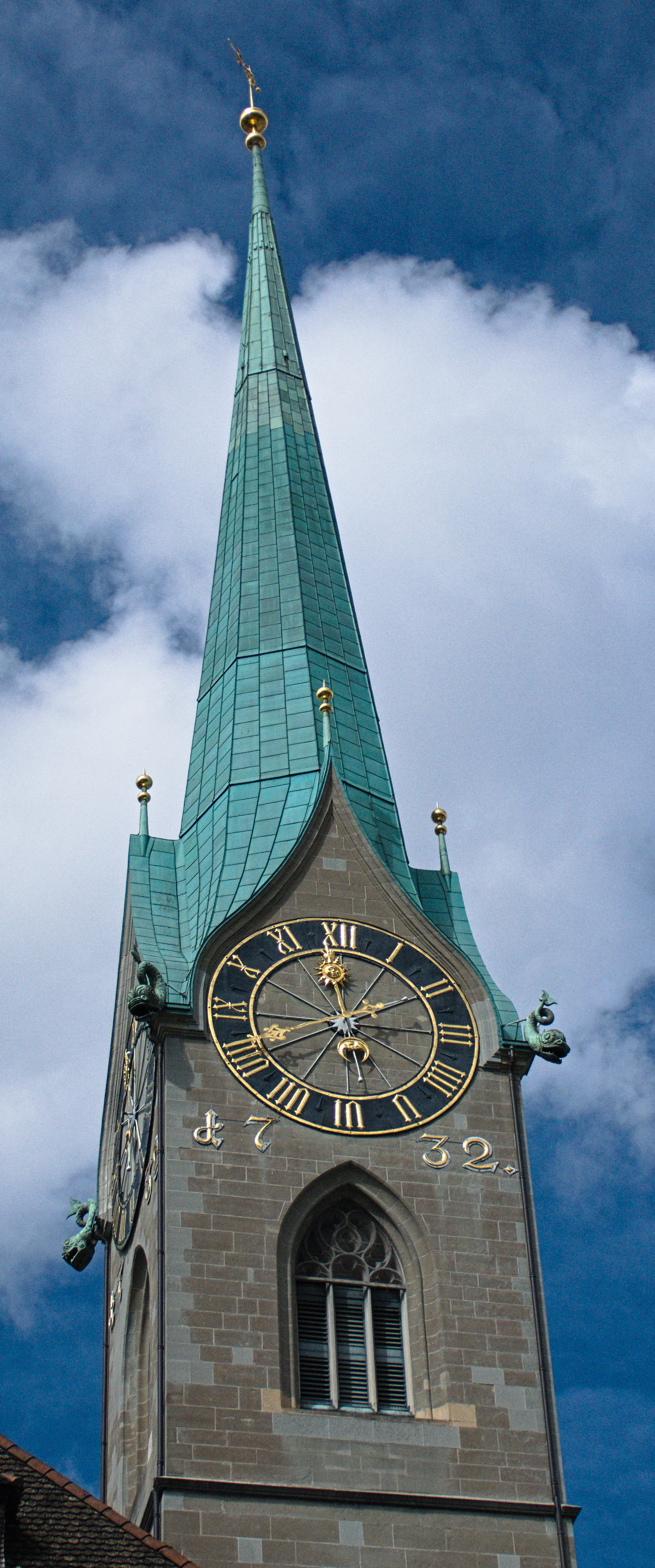
Fraumünster church tower

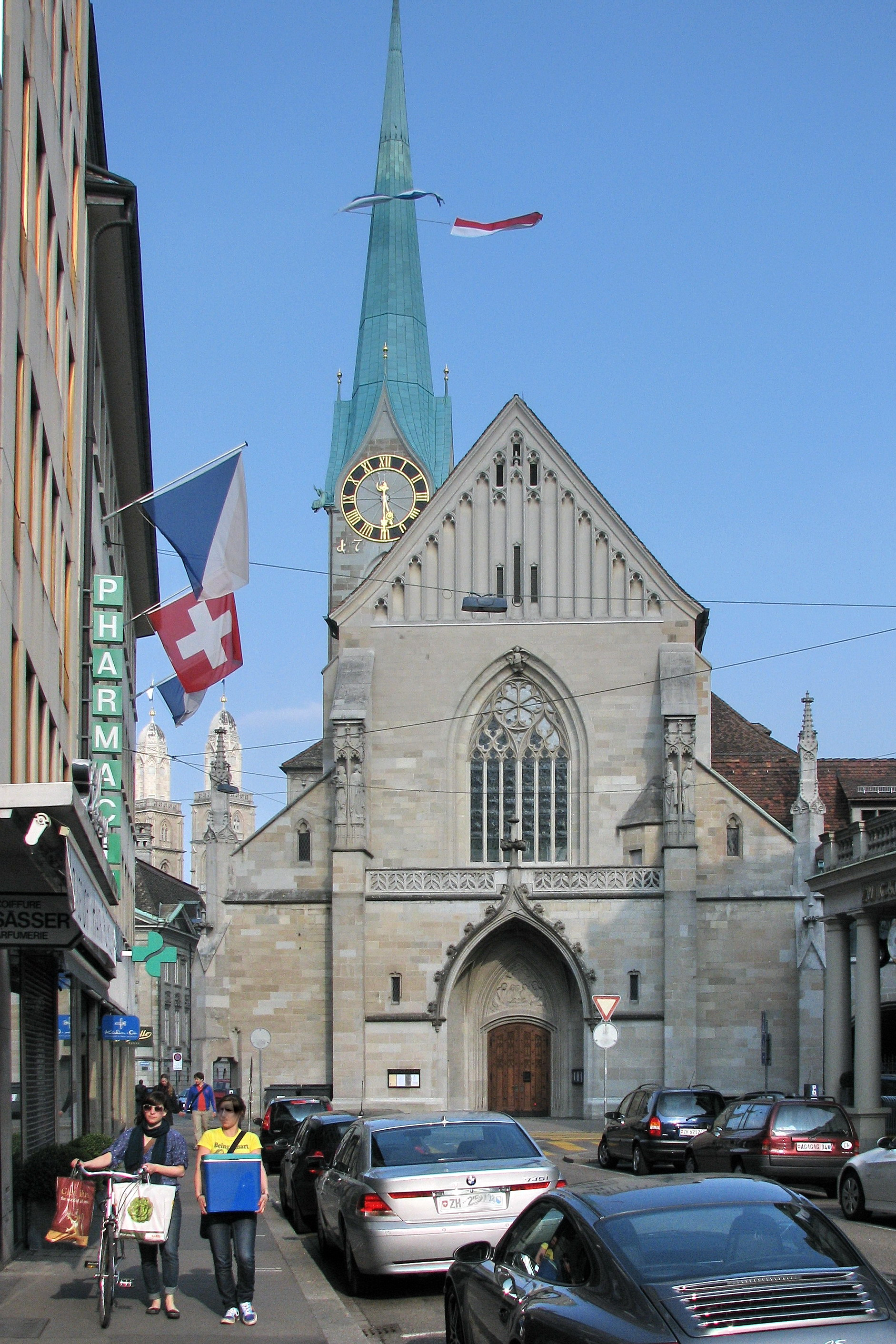
Fraumünster as seen from Poststrasse towards Paradeplatz

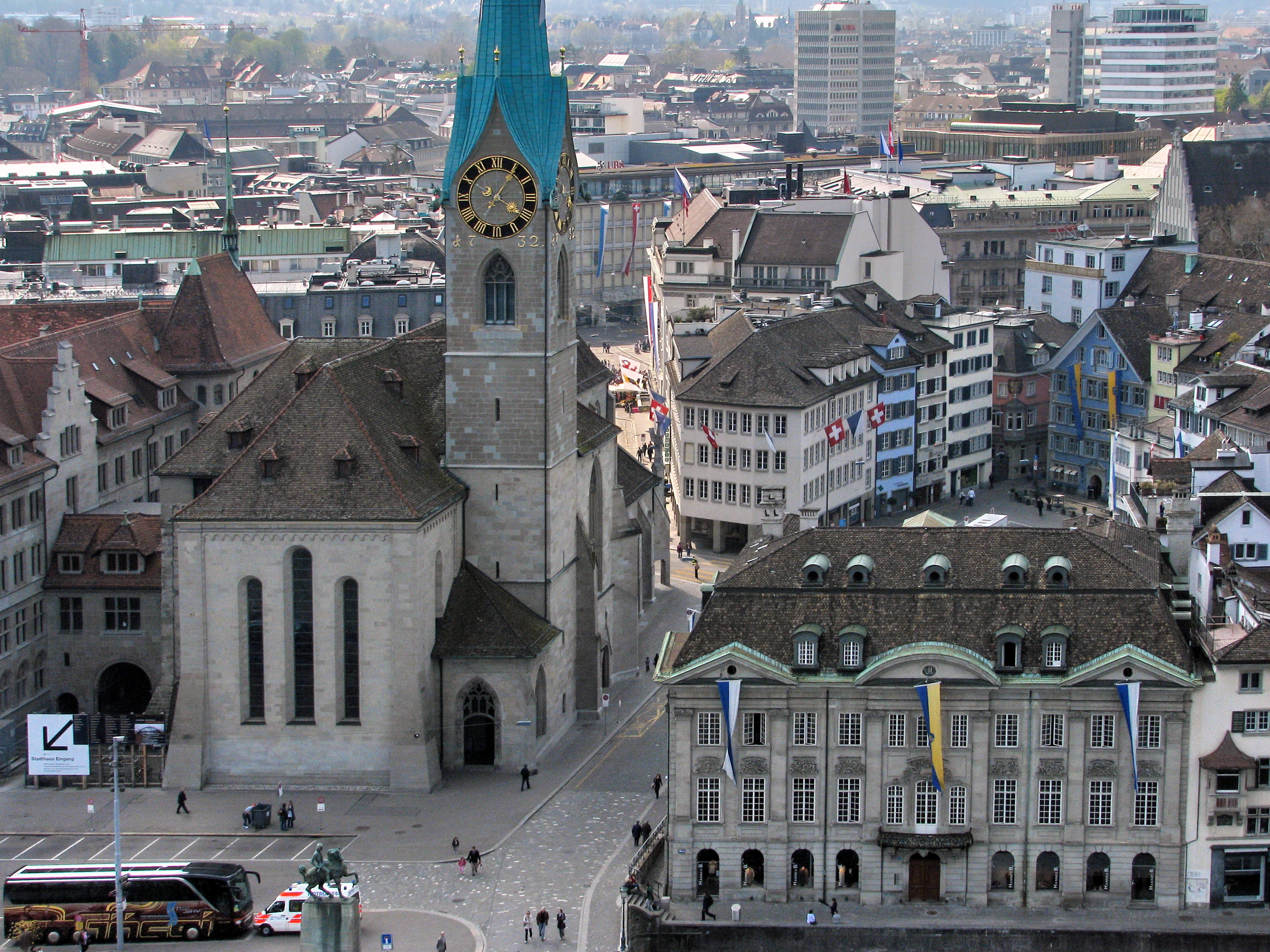
Fraumünster, Münsterhof and Zunfthaus zur Meisen as seen from Grossmünster

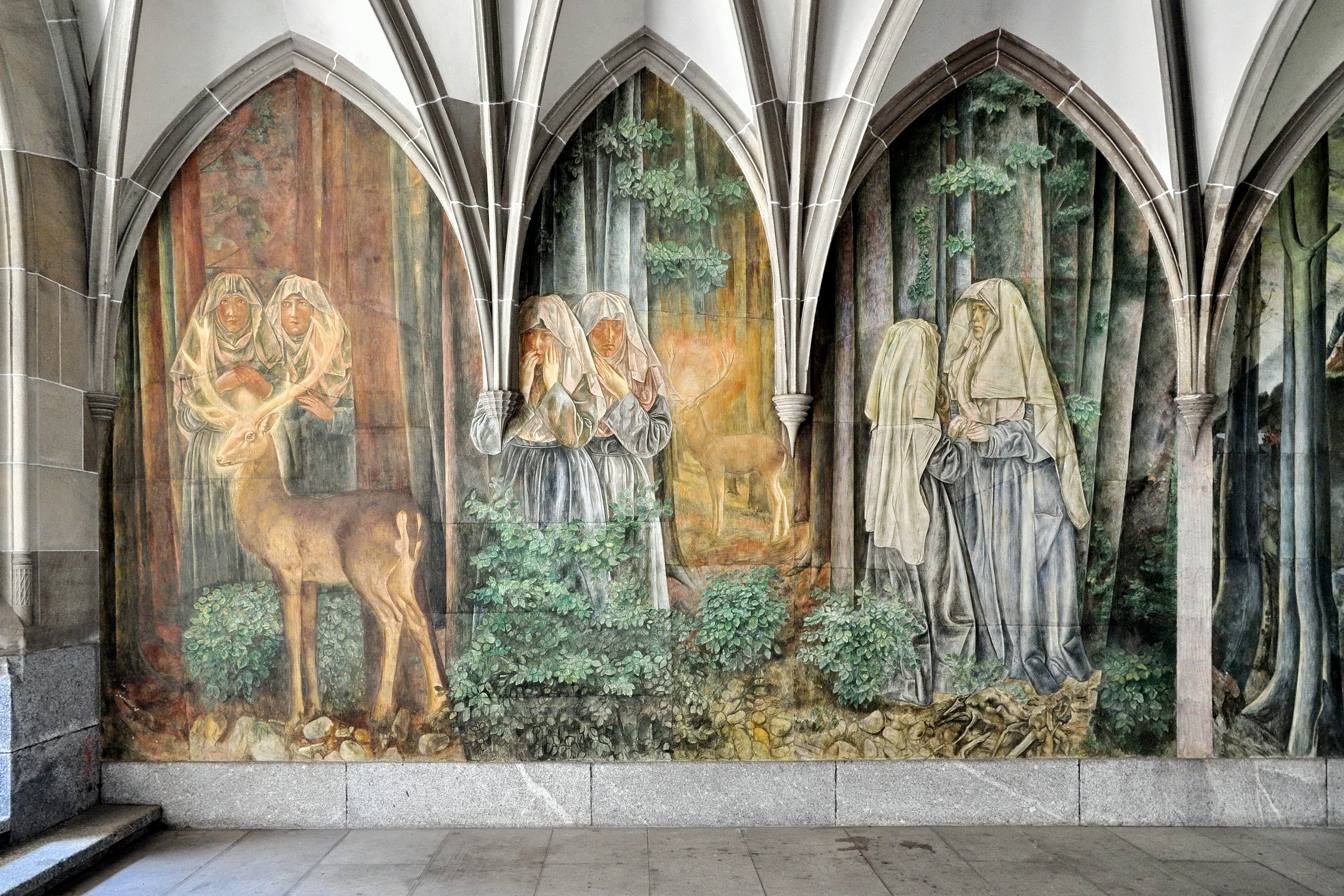
Fresco by Paul Bodmer in Fraumünster's former cloister

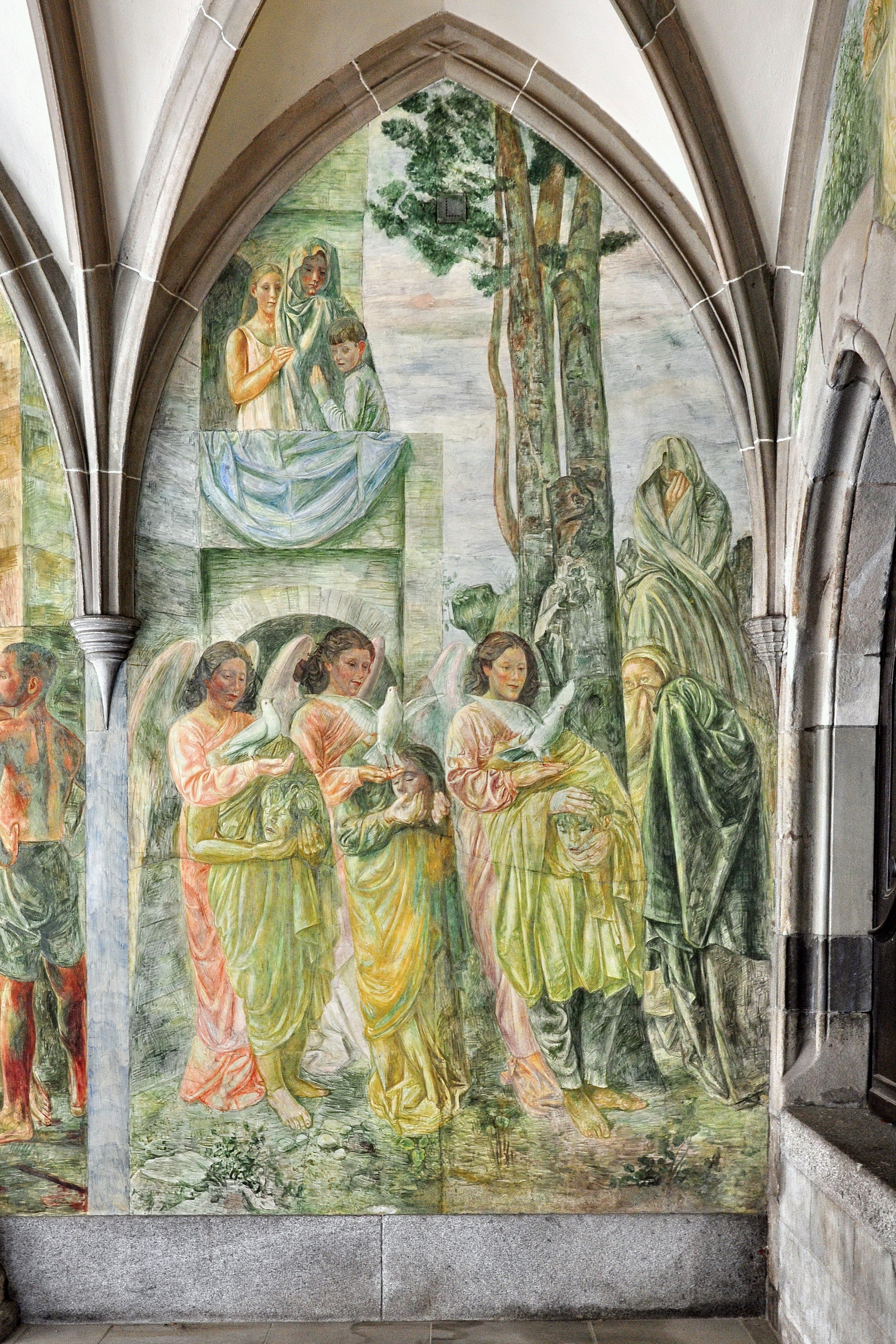
Zürich's saints on a fresco by Paul Bodmer: Exuperantius, Felix and Regula

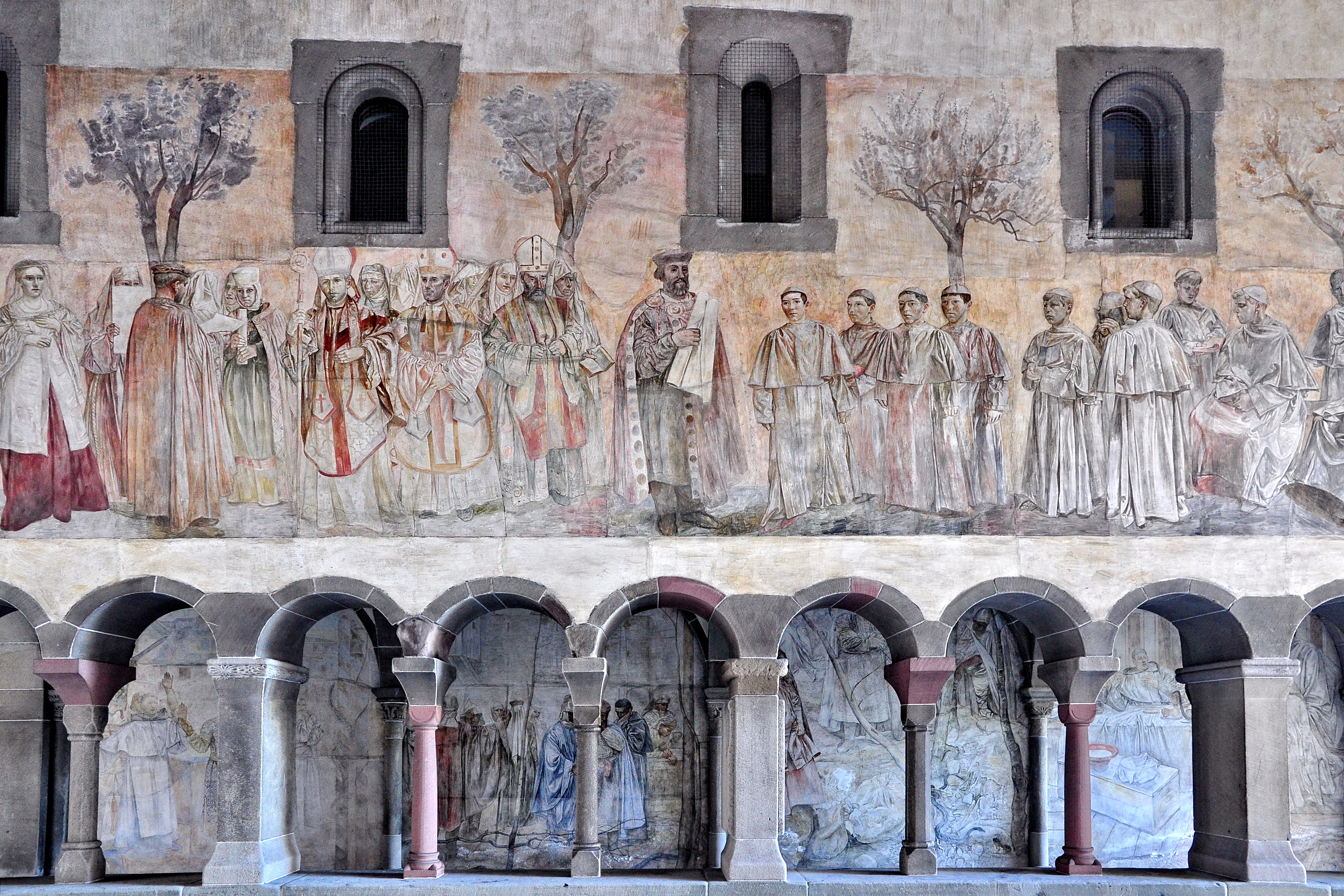
Fresco by Paul Bodmer in former cloister

== Abbesses ==
There have been at least 29 abbesses in the building's history:

- Hildegard (828–856 or 859), first abbess of Fraumünster Abbey
- Bertha (857–877?), daughter of Louis the German
- Richardis (878–893), wife of Emperor Charles the Fat
- Kunigunde (893–?)
- Gisela before (929–?)
- Regelinda (929–958), wife of von Herzog Burchard II. von Schwaben
- Uta (ca. 980)
- Ermentrudis (ca. 995–ca. 1030)
- Irmgart (1037–1045)
- Hedwig von Wolhusen (ca. 1070–?)
- Mechtild von Tirol (1143–1172)
- A. ? (ca. 1212)
- Gisela von Spiegelberg (1218–1221)
- Adelheid von Murkart (1222–1224)
- Judenta von Hagenbuch (1229–1254)
- Elisabeth von Schneckenburg (1255)
- Mechtild von Wunnenberg (1255–1268)
- Elisabeth von Wetzikon (1270–1298)
- Elisabeth von Spiegelberg (1298–1308)
- Elisabeth von Matzingen (1308–1340)
- Fides von Klingen (1340–1358)
- Beatrix von Wolhusen (1358–1398)
- Anna von Bussnang (1398–1404)
- Benedikta von Bechburg (1404–1412)
- Anastasia von Hohenklingen (1412–1429)
- Anna von Hewen (1429–1484)
- Sibylla von Helfenstein (1484–1487)
- Elisabeth von Weissenburg (1487–1496)
- Katharina von Zimmern (1496–1524)

== Cultural heritage of national importance ==
In the Swiss inventory of cultural property of national and regional significance the Fraumünster is listed as a Class A object of national importance.

== Literature ==
- Peter Vogelsanger: Zürich und sein Fraumünster. Eine elfhundertjährige Geschichte (853–1956). NZZ Libro, Zürich 1994, ISBN 3-85823-515-6

== See also ==
- Grossmünster
- Wasserkirche
