= Otto Meyer-Amden =

Swiss painter and graphic artist

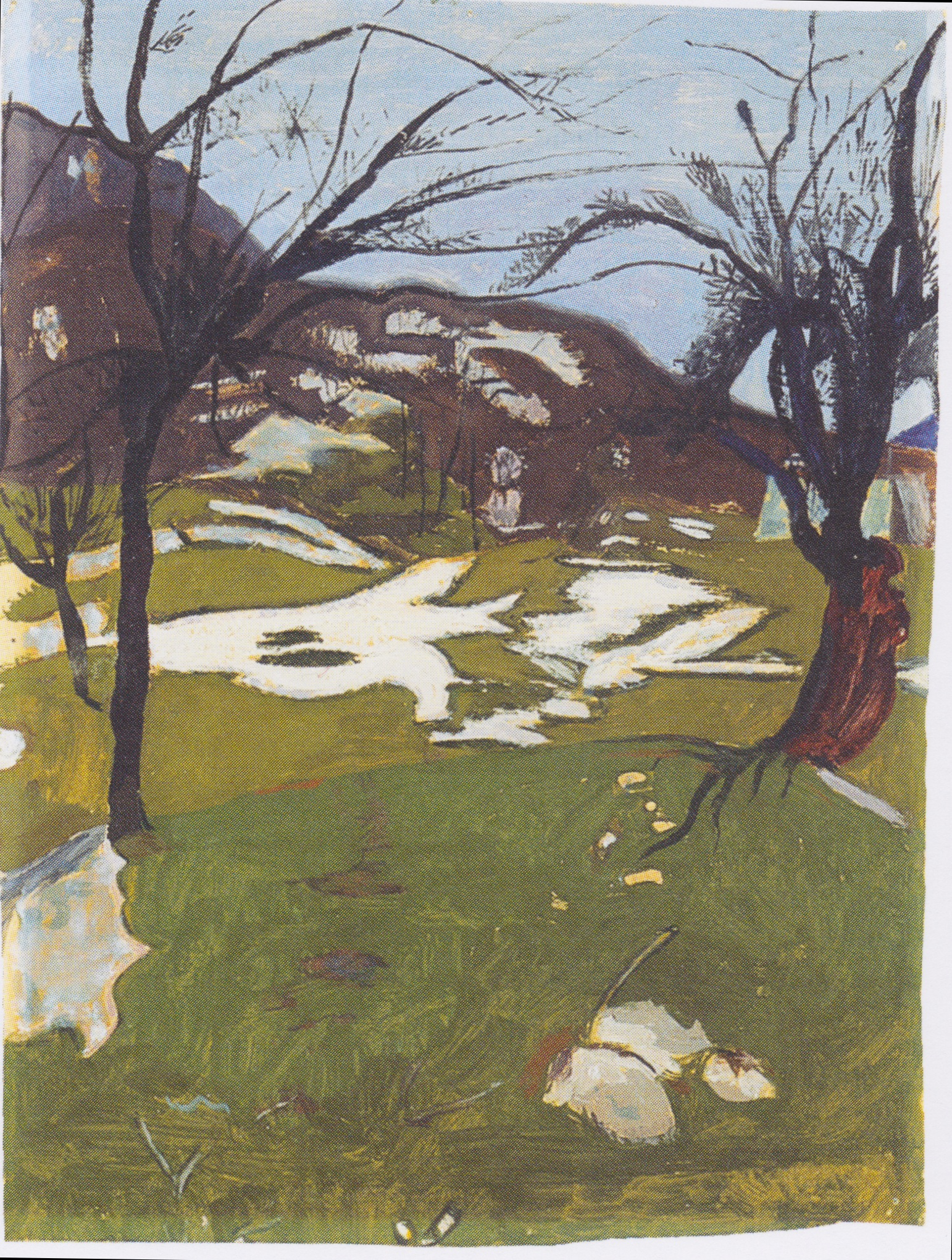
Otto Meyer-Amden, Amden Landscape, 1913

Otto Meyer-Amden (Born Otto Meyer, February 20, 1885, Bern - January 15, 1933, Zürich) was a Swiss painter and graphic artist. Otto Meyer-Amden don't used to refer to himself with Amden, he signed his letters as Otto Meyer.

== 1885-1912: Youth and Education ==
After the premature death of his mother in 1888 Otto Meyer was sent to live with foster parents. He was sent to an orphanage in Bern in 1892 where he lived until 1900. He attended secondary school in Bern from 1901 to 1903, and then worked as an apprentice Lithographer in Zürich from 1903 to 1906. During this time he made symbolic watercolor paintings. Alongside his apprenticeship he attended night classes at the Kunstgewerbeschule in Zürich.

From 1906 to 1907 Meyer studied at the Art Academy in Munich, during which time he lived with his brother Ernst. He then moved to Stuttgart to study at the State Academy of Fine Arts Stuttgart from 1907 to 1908. In 1909 Adolf Hölzel gave him the title of master student. In Stuttgart Meyer made the acquaintances of Oskar Schlemmer, Willi Baumeister, and other artists. Oskar Schlemmer proved to be a lifelong friend. It was around this time that Meyer first read Oscar Wilde's Dorian Gray. In 1907 he took study trips to Strassburg and Paris, where he first saw works by Paul Cézanne.

== 1912-1928: Amden ==
In 1912 Meyer received an invitation from artists Willi Baumeister and Herman Huber to live in their artists' colony in Amden. Meyer stayed there until 1928, long after Baumeister and Huber had moved away, living in relative isolation in an old farmhouse. He wrote extensively in his diary, especially between 1913 and 1915, and became increasingly interested in the bible.

Between 1915 and 1918 Meyer began making tonally dark graphite drawings, developing a similar technique as Georges Seurat's. In 1922 he became friends with Ernst Ludwig Kirchner. In 1923 Meyer designed a stained-glass work for the Zwinglian House in Zürich. In 1925 he participated in the „Grossen Schweizer Kunstausstellung“ in Karlsruhe, exhibiting eight of his works.

== 1928-1933: Zürich ==
In 1929 Meyer exhibited twelve of his works in the exhibition "Abstract and Surrealist Painting and Sculpture" at Kunsthaus Zürich. From 1928 until his premature death in 1933, Meyer-Amden taught at the School of Applied Arts in Zürich.

Otto Meyer renamed himself Meyer-Amden after having experienced such a profound connection to the village he'd lived in. He left behind around 500 paintings and drawings; abstract figure paintings with expressive and religious elements, scenes depicting youths at boarding schools, street scenes in Zürich, and watercolors with symbolic linear compositions. His interest in representing young men is often attributed to his homosexuality.[3] Although he never made a living from his work, he is now remembered as an important predecessor for abstract painting in Switzerland and for his influence on Oskar Schlemmer.[4]

Works by Otto Meyer-Amden were posthumously exhibited at documenta I (1955) and documenta III (1964).

== Exhibitions ==
- 2010: Otto Meyer-Amden: nuances. Ernst Barlach House, Hamburg
- 2012: 100 years Otto Meyer-Amden, 1912 - 2012. Museum Amden

== Literature ==
- Wolfgang Kermer (ed.): From Willi Baumeister's diaries: Memories of Otto Meyer-Amden, Adolf Hölzel, Paul Klee, Karl Konrad Düssel and Oskar Schlemmer. With supplementary writings and letters of Willi Baumeister. Cantz, Ostfildern-Ruit, 1996. ( Contributions to the History of the State Academy of Fine Arts Stuttgart, 8) ISBN 3-89322-421-1.
- Andreas Meier: Meyer-Amden, Otto. In: New German Biography (NDB). Volume 17, Duncker & Humblot, Berlin 1994, ISBN 3-428-00198-2, S. 378 f. ( Digital copy ).
- Andreas Meier: Otto Meyer-Amden. Encounters with Oskar Schlemmer, Willi Baumeister, Hermann Huber and other artists. Kunstmuseum Bern, 1985-1986
- Karsten Müller (eds.): Otto Meyer-Amden: Nuances, exhibition catalog. Kerber, Bielefeld 2010. ISBN 978-3-86678-376-8.
- Harald Szeemann : Visionary Switzerland at the Kunsthaus Zürich, 1991
- Beat Wismer, Paul-André Jaccard: 20th Century - From Cuno Amiet today Aargauer Kunsthaus Aarau., 1983
