= Felix and Regula =

Coptic Orthodox and Roman Catholic saints

Saints Felix, Regula and Exuperantius
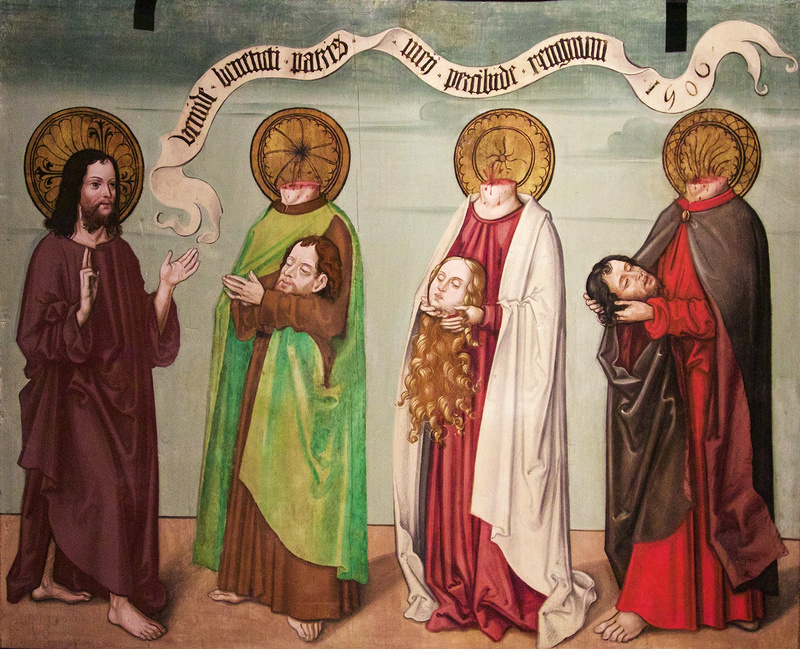
- Jesus and Felix, Regula, Exuperantius, 1506

Martyrs
- Born: Egypt
- Died: 11 September 286; Grossmünster, Switzerland
- Venerated in: Coptic Orthodox Church; Eastern Orthodox Church; Oriental Orthodox Churches; Roman Catholic Church
- Major shrine: Sts. Felix and Regula at Zürich
- Feast: 11 September
- Patronage: Zürich

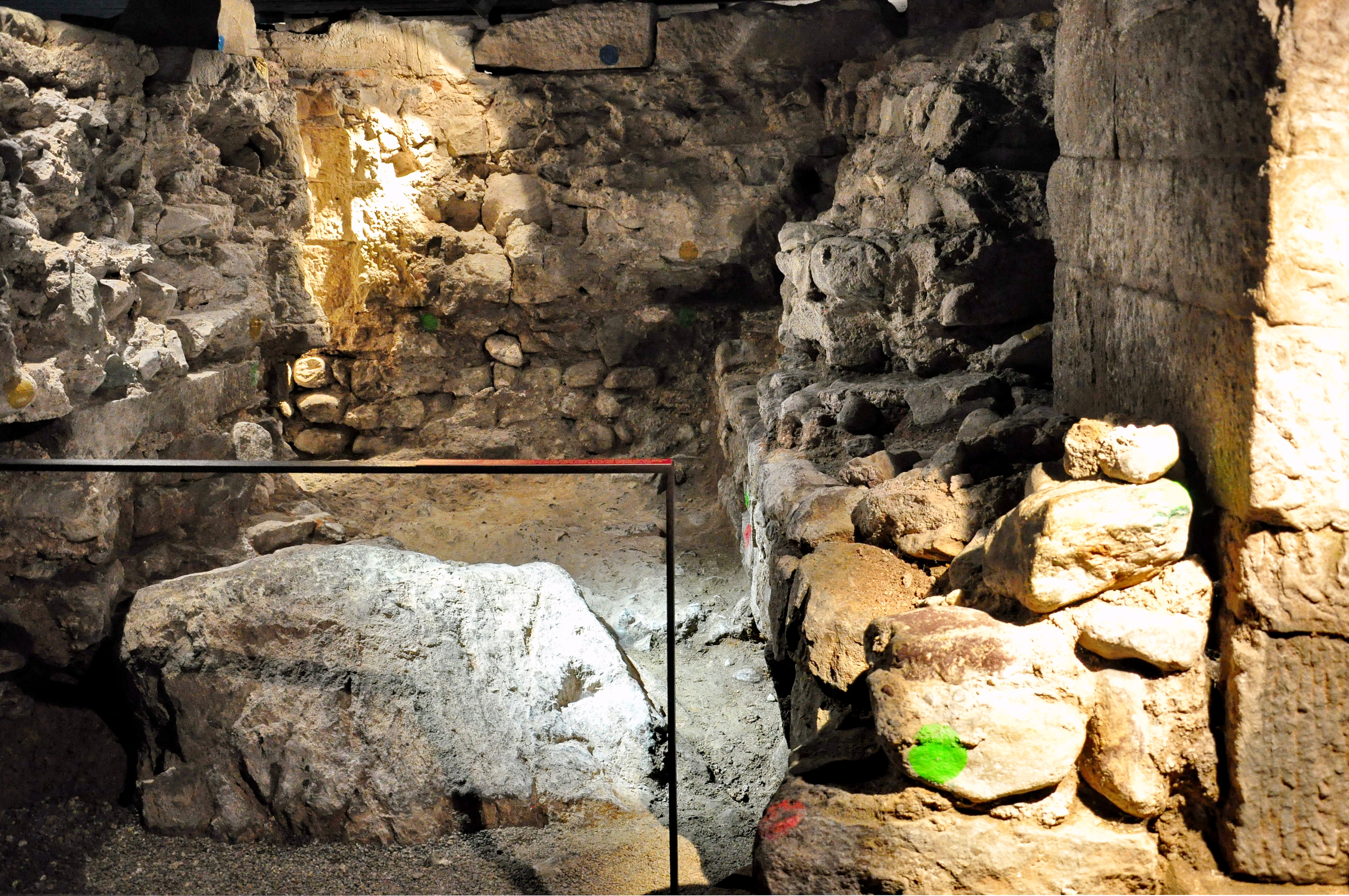
Wasserkirche church Crypt with 'Martyr stone', the supposed execution site

Felix and Regula (together with their servant Exuperantius) are Coptic Orthodox and Roman Catholic saints. They are the patron saints of Zürich.

Felix and Regula were brother and sister, beheaded in the third century, along with Exuperantius, for converting to Christianity. Their feast day is 11 September in the Gregorian calendar, celebrated on the same day using the Julian calendar (which is the 24th of September Gregorian), the 14th of Tout in the Coptic Calendar.

== History ==
Felix and Regula were siblings, and members of the Theban legion which was based in Egypt under Saint Maurice and stationed in Agaunum in the Valais, Switzerland. When the legion refused to sacrifice to Emperor Maximian, the order was given to execute them. The siblings fled, reaching Zürich (then called Turicum) via Glarus before they were caught, tried and executed in 286. According to legend, after decapitation, they miraculously stood to their feet, picked up their own heads, walked forty paces uphill, and prayed before lying down in death. They were buried on the spot where they lay down, on the hilltop which would become the site of the Grossmünster.

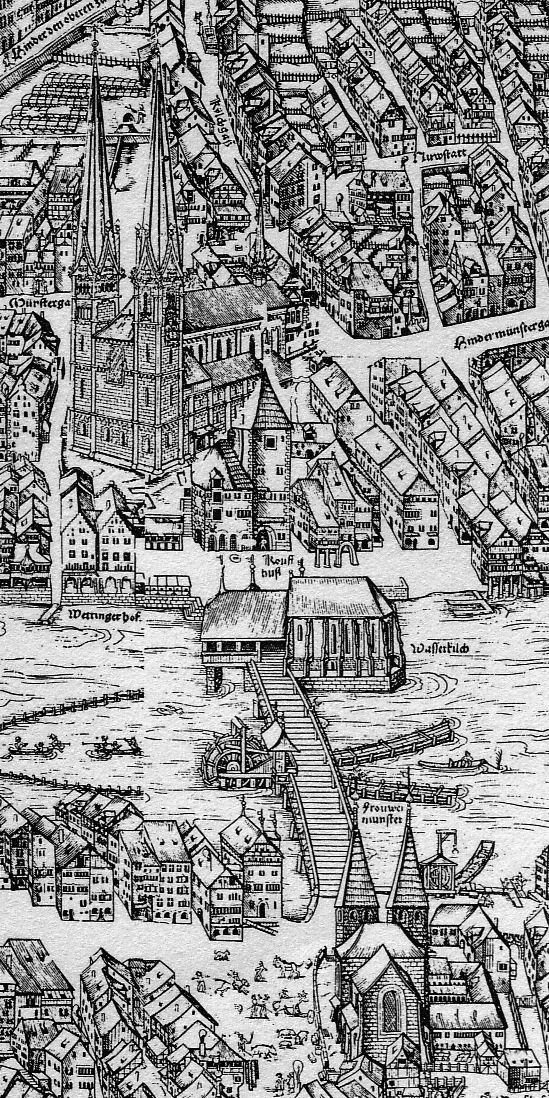
Detail of a plan of Zürich, 1576. Shown is the Grossmünster church, burial place of Saints Felix and Regula, at the river Limmat the Wasserkirche (Water Church), their execution site, and on the left side of the Limmat the Fraumünster Abbey, where important relics of the saints used to be on display to the public.

This story was revealed in a dream to a monk called Florentius in the 8th century. It largely contributed to the massive conversion of the inhabitants of these regions to Christianity and had such an impact on Zurich that these three saints still appear on the seal of Zurich today.

In the 9th century, there was a small monastery at the location, outside the settlement of Zürich which was situated on the left side of the Limmat. The Grossmünster was built on their graves from ca. 1100, and the Wasserkirche was built at the site of their execution.

From the 13th century, images of the saints were used in official seals of the city and on coins. On the saints' feast day, their relics were carried in procession between the Grossmünster and the Fraumünster, and the two monasteries vied for possession of the relics, which attracted enough pilgrims to make Zürich the most important pilgrimage site in the bishopric of Konstanz.

With the dissolution of the monasteries by Huldrych Zwingli in 1524, their possessions were confiscated and the graves of the martyrs were opened. There are conflicting versions of what happened then. Heinrich Bullinger, a Protestant theologian, claimed that the graves were empty save for a few bone fragments, which were piously buried in the common graveyard outside the church. The Catholics, on the other hand, claimed that the reformers were planning to throw the relics of the saints into the river, and that a courageous man of Uri (who happened to be exiled from Uri, and by his action earned amnesty) stole the relics from the church. He carried them to Andermatt, where the two skulls of Felix and Regula can be seen to this day, while the remaining relics were returned to Zürich in 1950, to the newly built St. Felix und Regula Catholic church.

The skulls have been Carbon 14 dated, and while one dates to the Middle Ages, the other is in fact composed of fragments of two separate skulls, of which one is medieval, and the other could indeed date to Roman times.

Zurich's Knabenschiessen competition, which started in 1889, originated with the feast day of the saints on 11 September, which came to be the "national holiday" of the early modern Republic of Zürich.

== Historicity ==
The account of the Theban legion is regarded as fictitious by many modern historians. However, other historians believe that historical and archaeological evidence places the legion in Switzerland at that time.

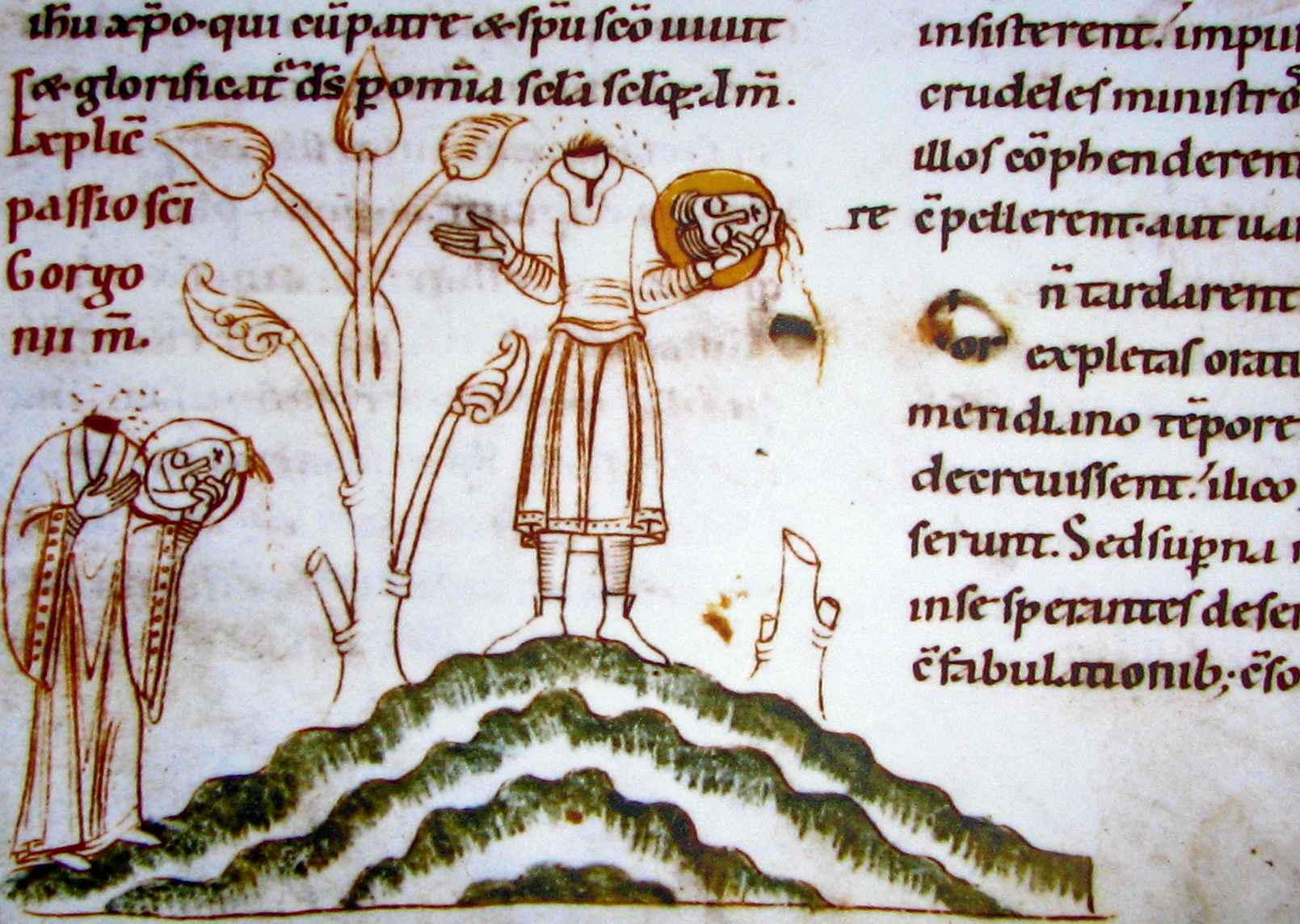
Felix & Regula in 'Stuttgarter Passionale' (1130)

== See also ==
- Saints Felix and Regula, patron saint archive

== Literature ==
- Hansueli Etter, Urs Baur, Jürg Hanser, Jürg Schneider (Hrsg.): Die Zürcher Stadtheiligen Felix und Regula. Legenden, Reliquien, Geschichte und ihre Botschaft im Licht moderner Forschung. Hochbauamt der Stadt Zürich/Büro für Archäologie, Zürich 1988 ISBN 3-905243-01-6
- Walter Nigg: Felix und Regula, Aneignung einer Legende. Zürich: SV International, Schweizer Verlagshaus, 1983. ISBN 3-7263-6361-0
- Jürg Hanser, Armin Mathis, Ulrich Ruoff, Jürg Schneider: Das neue Bild des Alten Zürich. Zürich 1983
- Cécile Ramer, Felix, Regula und Exuperantius; Ikonographie der Stifts- und Stadtheiligen Zürichs. Zürich: Antiquarische Gesellschaft, 1973.
