= Engelhardt =

Engelhardt is a surname. Notable people with the surname include:

- Members of the noble Russian Engelhardt family, including:
  - Christoph von Engelhardt (1762–1831), Baltic German general
  - Alexander Engelhardt (general) (1795–1859), Russian lieutenant general and chief of Russian southern military settlements
  - Valerian Engelhardt (1798–1856), Russian lieutenant general and public official, brother of Nikolai Engelhardt
  - Nikolai Engelhardt (1799–1856), Russian lieutenant general, brother of Valerian Engelhardt
  - Vasily Engelhardt (1828–1915), Russian astronomer and public figure
  - Alexander Nikolayevich Engelhardt (1832–1893), Russian agricultural scientist
  - Aleksandra von Engelhardt (1754–1838), Russian noble and one of the "Potemkin nieces"
  - Varvara von Engelhardt (1752–1815), maiden name of Varvara Golitsyna, Russian noble and one of the "Potemkin nieces"
  - Yekaterina von Engelhardt (1761–1829), Russian noble and one of the "Potemkin nieces"
- August Engelhardt (1875–1919), German author
- Brett Engelhardt (born 1980), American ice hockey player
- Bryan Engelhardt (born 1982), Dutch baseball player
- Christer Engelhardt (born 1969), Swedish politician
- George Paul Engelhardt (1871–1942), American entomologist
- Grigori Engelhardt (1759–1834), Russian general
- Helen Engelhardt, American artist
- Henry Engelhardt (born 1958), American businessman, founder and chief executive of Admiral Group
- H. Tristram Engelhardt Jr. (1941–2018), American philosopher and bioethicist
- Johann Georg Veit Engelhardt (1791–1855), German theologian
- John Engelhardt, American geneticist
- Kurt D. Engelhardt (born 1960), United States federal judge
- Marc Engelhardt, German bassoonist
- Marco Engelhardt (born 1980), German footballer
- Netta Engelhardt, Israeli-American physicist
- Nikolai Engelhardt (writer) (1867–1942), Russian writer and critic
- Otto Engelhardt (1866–1936), German engineer and diplomat
- Sadie Engelhardt (born 2006), American middle distance runner
- Tom Engelhardt, American author, co-founder of American Empire Project, and creator of Tomdispatch.com
- Wolf von Engelhardt (1910–2008), German geologist
- Yannik Engelhardt (born 2001), German footballer
- Zephyrin Engelhardt (1851–1934), German-born Roman Catholic priest

== See also ==
- Engelhard (disambiguation)
- Engleheart
- Englehart
