= General Engelhardt =

General Engelhardt may refer to:

- Adriaan Engelvaart (1812–1893), Royal Netherlands Army general
- Alexander Bogdanovich Engelhardt (1795–1859), Russian Army lieutenant general
- Christoph von Engelhardt (1762–1831), Baltic German general
- Grigori Engelhardt (1759–1834), Russian Army major general
- Lothar Engelhardt (1939–2010), German National People's Army major general
- Nikolai Engelhardt (1799–1856), Russian Army lieutenant general
- Valerian Engelhardt (1798–1856), Russian Army lieutenant general

== See also ==
- Boris Alexandrovich Engelhardt (1877–1962), Imperial Russian Army commander
