= Englert =

Englert is a surname. Notable people with the surname include:

- Alice Englert (born 1994), Australian actress
- Berthold-Georg Englert (born 1953), Provost's Chair Professor at the National University of Singapore
- Carrie Englert (born 1957), United States gymnastics champion in floor exercise and balance beam in 1976
- François Englert (1932–2026), Belgian theoretical physicist and Nobel laureate
- Helena Englert (born 2000), Polish actress
- J.F. Englert, American fiction novel writer, non-fiction writer, and screenwriter
- Jan Englert (born 1943), Polish film actor
- Joe Englert (1961–2020), Washington DC area restaurateur
- Mark Englert, American musician, guitarist for Dramarama since 1982
- Mason Englert, American baseball player
- Michał Englert (born 1975), Polish cinematographer and screenwriter
- Peter Englert, former Chancellor of the University of Hawaiʻi at Mānoa
- Sabine Englert (born 1981), German team handball goalkeeper
- Sebastian Englert OFM Cap., (1888–1969), Capuchin Franciscan friar, priest, missionary, linguist and ethnologist

== See also ==
- Father Sebastian Englert Anthropological Museum, in the town of Hanga Roa on Rapa Nui (Easter Island) in Chilean Polynesia
- Englert Theatre in Iowa City, a splendidly renovated vaudeville-era playhouse
- Engelbert (disambiguation)
- Englebert (disambiguation)
- Englehardt (disambiguation)
- Englehart
- Engleheart
- Engler
