= Battle of Friedland order of battle =

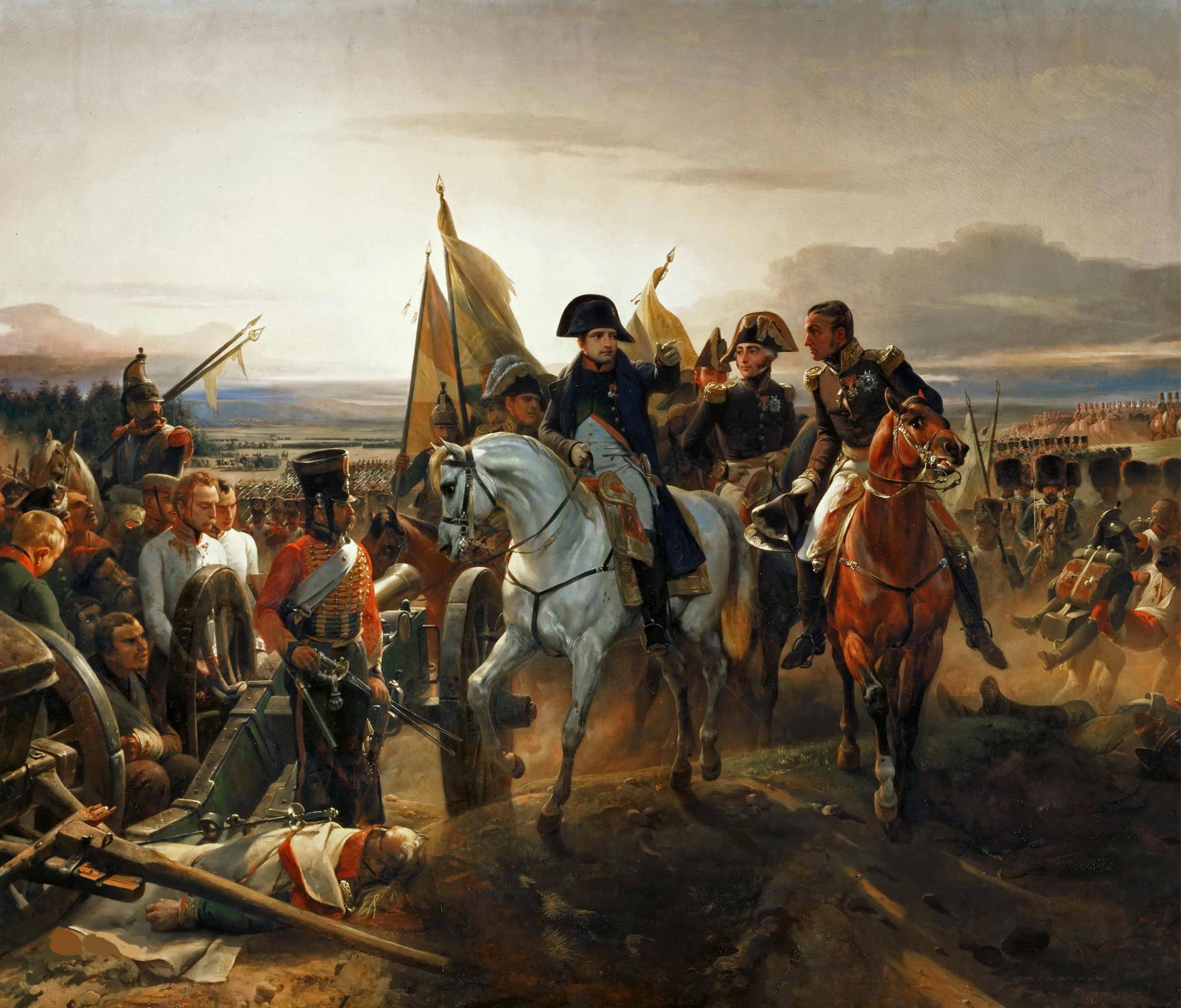
The Battle of Friedland by Horace Vernet, 1835

The Battle of Friedland was fought on 14 June 1807, between the army of the French Empire under the command of Napoleon on one side, and that of the Russian Empire led by Levin August von Bennigsen on the other. The Russians made the mistake of giving battle with their backs to the River Alle, into which they were forced by the attacks of the French leading to heavy casualties.

During the fighting, 80,000 French and allied troops faced 60,000 Russian soldiers, though not all were engaged in the fighting. The French suffered around 10,000 casualties, with the Russians losing at least twice as many. The heavy defeat caused the Russians to sue for peace, opening negotiations for the Treaties of Tilsit soon after and bringing an end to the War of the Fourth Coalition.

== French and allied forces ==
Emperor Napoleon I

=== Reserve Corps ===
Marshal Jean Lannes

- Division d'Elite: Général de division Nicolas Oudinot
  - 1st Brigade: Général de brigade François Amable Ruffin
    - 1st Provisional Grenadier Regiment (2 battalions)
    - 2nd Provisional Grenadier Regiment (2 battalions)
  - 2nd Brigade: Général de brigade Nicolas François Conroux
    - 3rd Provisional Grenadier Regiment (2 battalions)
    - 4th Provisional Grenadier Regiment (2 battalions)
  - 3rd Brigade: Général de brigade Louis Jacques de Coehorn
    - 5th Provisional Grenadier Regiment (2 battalions)
    - 6th Provisional Grenadier Regiment (2 battalions)
  - 4th Brigade: Général de brigade Joseph Jean-Baptiste Albert
    - 7th Provisional Grenadier Regiment (2 battalions)
    - 8th Provisional Grenadier Regiment (2 battalions)
- 2nd Division: Général de division Jean-Antoine Verdier
  - 1st Brigade: Général de brigade Dominique Honoré Antoine Vedel
    - 2nd Demi-brigade Light Infantry (2 battalions)
    - 15th Demi-brigade Light Infantry (2 battalions)
  - 2nd Brigade: Général de brigade Jean Isidore Harispe
    - 3rd Demi-brigade Line Infantry (2 battalions)
    - 72nd Demi-brigade Line Infantry (2 battalions)
- Saxon Division (part): Generallieutenant von Polentz
  - Grenadier Battalion von Süssmilch
  - Grenadier Battalion von Larisch
  - Infantry Regiment Bevilaqua (1 battalion)
- 1st Heavy Cavalry Division: Général de division Étienne Marie Antoine Champion de Nansouty
  - 1st Brigade: Général de brigade Jean-Marie Antoine Defrance
    - 1st Carabinier Regiment (3 squadrons)
    - 2nd Carabinier Regiment (3 squadrons)
  - 2nd Brigade: Général de brigade Jean-Pierre Doumerc
    - 2nd Cuirassier Regiment (3 squadrons)
    - 9th Cuirassier Regiment (3 squadrons)
  - 3rd Brigade: Général de brigade Antoine-Louis Decrest de Saint-Germain
    - 3rd Cuirassier Regiment (3 squadrons)
    - 12th Cuirassier Regiment (3 squadrons)
  - Artillery: ½ horse artillery battery (3 guns)
- Corps Artillery: 4 batteries foot artillery (2 French, 2 Saxon)

=== Reserve Cavalry Corps ===
Général de division Emmanuel de Grouchy

- 2nd Dragoon Division: Général de division Emmanuel de Grouchy
  - 1st Brigade: Général de brigade Jacques Louis François Milet
    - 3rd Dragoon Regiment (3 squadrons)
    - 6th Dragoon Regiment (3 squadrons)
  - 2nd Brigade: Général de brigade Jean Augustin Carrié de Boissy
    - 10th Dragoon Regiment (3 squadrons)
    - 11th Dragoon Regiment (3 squadrons)
  - Artillery: ½ horse artillery battery (3 guns)
- I Corps Light Cavalry Brigade: Général de brigade Louis-Chrétien Carrière
  - 2nd Hussars (3 squadrons)
  - 4th Hussars (3 squadrons)
  - 5th Chasseurs à Cheval (3 squadrons)
- Reserve Corps Cavalry Brigade: General von Besser
  - 9th Hussars (3 squadrons)
  - König Saxon Cuirassiers (4 squadrons)
  - Combined Saxon Chasseurs (1 squadron)

=== I Corps ===
Général de division Claude-Victor Perrin

- 1st Division: Général de division Pierre Dupont de l'Étang
  - 1st Brigade: Général de brigade André Adrien Joseph de La Bruyère
    - 9th Demi-brigade Light Infantry (2 battalions)
    - 24th Demi-brigade Line Infantry (3 battalions)
  - 2nd Brigade: Général de brigade Pierre Barrois
    - 32nd Demi-brigade Line Infantry (2 battalions)
    - 96th Demi-brigade Line Infantry (3 battalions)
- 2nd Division: Général de division Pierre Belon Lapisse
  - 1st Brigade: Général de brigade Michel-Marie Pacthod
    - 16th Demi-brigade Light Infantry (2 battalions)
    - 45th Demi-brigade Line Infantry (2 battalions)
  - 2nd Brigade: Général de brigade Augustin Darricau
    - 8th Demi-brigade Line Infantry (2 battalions)
    - 54th Demi-brigade Line Infantry (2 battalions)
- 3rd Division: Général de division Eugène-Casimir Villatte
  - 1st Brigade: Général de brigade Bernard-Georges-François Frère
    - 27th Demi-brigade Light Infantry (2 battalions)
    - 63rd Demi-brigade Line Infantry (2 battalions)
  - 2nd Brigade: Général de brigade Étienne Maurice Gérard
    - 94th Demi-brigade Line Infantry (2 battalions)
    - 95th Demi-brigade Line Infantry (2 battalions)
- Corps Artillery: Général de brigade Alexandre-Antoine Hureau de Sénarmont
  - 4 batteries foot artillery, 2 batteries horse artillery
- 4th Dragoon Division (attached): Général de division Armand Lebrun de La Houssaye
  - 1st Brigade: Général de brigade Pierre Margaron
    - 17th Dragoons (3 squadrons)
    - 27th Dragoons (3 squadrons)
  - 2nd Brigade: Général de brigade Jean-Baptiste Antoine Laplanche
    - 18th Dragoons (3 squadrons)
    - 19th Dragoons (3 squadrons)
  - Artillery: ½ horse artillery battery (3 guns)
- Saxon Cavalry Brigade (attached): Major Johann Adolf, Freiherr von Thielmann
  - Leibkurassier Chevauxlegers (3 squadrons)
  - Karabinier Chevauxlegers (3 squadrons)
  - Prinz Johann Chevauxlegers (3 squadrons)

=== VI Corps ===
Marshal Michel Ney

- 1st Division: Général de division Jean Gabriel Marchand
  - 1st Brigade: Général de brigade Antoine Louis Popon de Maucune
    - 6th Demi-brigade Light Infantry (2 battalions)
    - 69th Demi-brigade Line Infantry (2 battalions)
  - 2nd Brigade: Général de brigade Pierre-Louis Binet de Marcognet
    - 39th Demi-brigade Line Infantry (2 battalions)
    - 76th Demi-brigade Line Infantry (2 battalions)
  - 3rd Brigade: Général de brigade Jean Antoine Brun
    - 31st Demi-brigade Light Infantry (3 battalions)
- Light Cavalry: Général de brigade Pierre David de Colbert-Chabanais
  - 3rd Hussars (3 squadrons)
  - 10th Chasseurs à Cheval (3 squadrons)
  - 15th Chasseurs à Cheval (3 squadrons)
- Corps Artillery: Général de division Jean Nicolas Seroux de Fay
  - 3 batteries foot artillery, 2 batteries horse artillery
- 1st Dragoon Division (attached): Général de division Juste-Charles de Fay de La Tour-Maubourg
  - 1st Brigade: Général de brigade André Thomas Perreimond
    - 1st Dragoons (3 squadrons)
    - 2nd Dragoons (3 squadrons)
  - 2nd Brigade: Général de brigade Ignace-Laurent-Stanislas d'Oullenbourg
    - 4th Dragoons (3 squadrons)
    - 14th Dragoons (3 squadrons)
  - 3rd Brigade: Général de brigade Armand Joseph Henri Digeon
    - 20th Dragoons (3 squadrons)
    - 26th Dragoons (3 squadrons
  - Artillery: ½ horse artillery battery (3 guns)
- Dutch Cavalry Brigade (attached): Général de brigade Maurice Ignace Fresia
  - 2nd Hussars (3 squadrons)
  - 2nd Cuirassiers (3 squadrons)

=== VIII Corps ===
Marshal Édouard Mortier, Duke of Treviso

- 1st Division: Général de division Pierre Louis Dupas
  - 1st Brigade: Général de brigade Antoine Joseph Veaux
    - 4th Demi-brigade Light Infantry (2 battalions)
    - 15th Demi-brigade Line Infantry (2 battalions)
  - 2nd Brigade: Général de brigade Claude Ursule Gency
    - 58th Demi-brigade Line Infantry (2 battalions)
    - Garde de Paris (2 battalions)
  - 3rd Brigade: Général de brigade Balthazard Grandjean
    - Würzburg Infantry Regiment (2 battalions)
  - Artillery: 1 Dutch horse artillery battery
- 2nd (Polish) Division: Général de division Jan Henryk Dąbrowski
  - Infantry Brigade: Général de brigade Amilcar Kosinsky
    - 1st Regiment, Polish-Italian Legion (2 battalions)
    - 2nd Regiment, Polish-Italian Legion (2 battalions)
    - 3rd Regiment, Polish-Italian Legion (2 battalions)
  - Cavalry Brigade: Général de brigade Michel Sokolnicki
    - Polish-Italian Legion Cavalry Regiment (3 squadrons)
- Corps Artillery: Colonel Basile Baltus de Pouilly
  - 3 foot artillery batteries (2 French, 1 Polish), 1 Dutch horse artillery battery

=== Imperial Guard ===
Marshal Jean-Baptiste Bessières

- Infantry: Général de brigade Pierre-Augustin Hulin
  - 1st Brigade: Général de brigade Jean Marie Pierre Dorsenne
    - 1st Grenadiers (2 battalions)
    - 2nd Grenadiers (2 battalions)
  - 2nd Brigade: Général de brigade Jérôme Soulès
    - 1st Chasseurs (2 battalions)
    - 2nd Chasseurs (2 battalions)
  - 3rd Brigade: Major Joseph Boyer de Rébeval
    - 1st Fusilier-Grenadiers (2 battalions)
    - 2nd Fusilier-Grenadiers (2 battalions)
- Cavalry: Général de division Frédéric Henri Walther
  - Horse Grenadiers (6 squadrons)
  - Horse Chasseurs 6 squadrons)
  - Guard Dragoons (2 squadrons)
  - Elite/Ordonnance Gendarmes (3 squadrons)
- Artillery: Général de brigade Joseph Christophe Couin
  - 3 guard foot artillery batteries, 2 horse artillery batteries (1 guard, 1 line)

== Russian forces ==
General der Kavallerie Baron Levin August von Bennigsen

=== Left Wing ===
Generallieutenant Prince Pyotr Bagration

- Advanced Guard: Generallieutenant Prince Pyotr Bagration
  - Division: Generalmajor Karl Gustav von Baggovut
    - 3rd Jäger Regiment (3 battalions)
    - 4th Jäger Regiment (3 battalions)
    - 7th Jäger Regiment (3 battalions)
    - 24th Jäger Regiment (3 battalions)
  - Division: Generalmajor Nikolay Raevsky
    - Brigade: Colonel Ogarev
      - 5th Jäger Regiment (3 battalions)
      - 20th Jäger Regiment (3 battalions)
    - Brigade: Colonel Fritsch
      - 25th Jäger Regiment (3 battalions)
      - 23th Jäger Regiment (3 battalions)
      - 26th Jäger Regiment (3 battalions)
  - Reinforcements
    - Guard Jäger Regiment (2 battalions)
    - St. Petersburg Guard Militia Regiment (1 battalion)
  - Attached Cavalry
    - Pavlovgrad Hussar Regiment (l0 squadrons)
    - Grodno Hussar Regiment (l0 squadrons)
    - Artillery: 1 Horse Battery (12 guns)
- Support Group: Generalmajor Yevgeni Ivanovich Markov
    - Pskov Musketeer Regiment (3 battalions)
    - Tenguinsk Musketeer Regiment (3 battalions)
    - Kostroma Musketeer Regiment (3 battalions)
    - Staroskolsk Musketeer Regiment (3 battalions)
    - Moscow Grenadier Regiment (3 battalions)
- 6th Division: General Lovov
  - 1st Brigade: Generalmajor Vasily Sergeyevich Rakhmanov
    - Belosersk Musketeer Regiment (3 battalions)
    - Nisov Musketeer Regiment (3 battalions)
  - 2nd Brigade: Generalmajor Bykov
    - Revel Musketeer Regiment (3 battalions)
    - Belosersk Musketeer Regiment (3 battalions)
  - Artillery: Colonel Glouckhov
    - 2 Position Batteries, 3 Light Batteries (12 guns each)
- 2nd Division: Generallieutenant Alexander Ivanovich Ostermann-Tolstoy
  - 1st Brigade: Generalmajor Nikolai Mazovsky
    - Pavlov Grenadier Regiment (3 battalions)
    - Rostov Musketeer Regiment (3 battalions)
  - 2nd Brigade: Generalmajor Aleksandr Yakovlevich Sukin
    - Petersburg Grenadier Regiment (3 battalions)
    - Jelets Musketeer Regiment (3 battalions)
  - Artillery: Colonel Stavitzki
    - 2 12pdr Foot Artillery Batteries, 2 6pdr Foot Artillery Batteries (12 guns each)
- Cavalry
  - Kiev Dragoons (5 squadrons)
  - Tartar Uhlanst (5 squadrons)
  - Ekaterinoslav Cuirassiers (5 squadrons)
  - Emperor Cuirassiers (5 squadrons)
  - Little Russia Cuirassiers (5 squadrons)
  - Gardes à Cheval (5 squadrons) (reinforcements)
  - Horse Battery (12 guns)

=== Right Wing ===
Generallieutenant Prince Andrei Ivanovich Gorchakov

- Center: Generallieutenant Dmitry Dokhturov
  - 8th Division: Generalmajor Grigori Engelhardt
    - 1st Brigade
      - Schusselburg Musketeer Regiment (3 battalions)
      - Old Ingermanland Musketeer Regiment (3 battalions)
      - Polodsk Musketeer Regiment (3 battalions)
    - Artillery: Generalmajor Alexander Kutaisov
      - 4 Position Batteries (12 guns each)
    - Dragoon Brigade: Generalmajor Sakomelski
      - Kargopol Dragoons (5 squadrons)
      - St. Petersburg Dragoons (5 squadrons)
      - Ingremanland Dragoons (5 squadrons)
      - Horse Battery (12 guns)
  - 7th Division: Generallieutenant Magnus Gustav von Essen
    - 1st Brigade: Generalmajor Andrey Vasilievich Zapolsky
      - Iekaterinoslav Grenadier Regiment (3 battalions)
      - Moscow Musketeer Regiment (3 battalions)
    - 2nd Brigade
      - Vladimir Musketeer Regiment (3 battalions)
      - Voronej Musketeer Regiment (3 battalions)
    - Artillery: Colonel Andronov
    - 2 Position Batteries, 3 Light Batteries (2-12 guns each)
- Right
  - 3rd Division: Generalmajor Vasili Petrovich Titov II
    - 1st Brigade: Generalmajor Fedor Alexandrovich Uschakov
      - Tauride Grenadier Regiment (3 battalions)
      - Lithuanian Musketeer Regiment (3 battalions)
    - 2nd Brigade
      - Kaporsk Musketeer Regiment (3 battalions)
      - Mourmansk Musketeer Regiment (3 battalions)
    - 3rd Brigade: Generalmajor Ivan Ivanovich Briseman von Netting
      - Tchernigov Musketeer Regiment (3 battalions)
      - Dnieper Musketeer Regiment (3 battalions)
    - Artillery:
      - 2 12pdr Foot Artillery Batteries, 3 6pdr Foot Artillery Batteries
  - Cavalry of the Right wing: Generallieutenant Fyodor Uvarov
    - 1st Brigade
      - 3 Cossack Regiments
    - 2nd Brigade: Generalmajor Lourkovski
      - Soum Hussars (10 squadrons)
      - Elizabethgrad Hussars (10 squadrons)
      - Lithuanian Uhlans (10 squadrons)
    - Artillery
      - 1 Horse Battery (12 guns)
    - Guard: Generallieutenant Kologrivov
      - Guard Hussars (5 squadrons)
      - Guard Uhlans (10 squadrons)
      - 3 Cossack Regiments
      - Military Order Cuirassiers (5 squadrons)
      - Horse Battery (12 guns)
  - Cavalry of the Left Wing: Generallieutenant Prince Dmitry Golitsyn
    - 1st Brigade: Generalmajor Charles de Lambert
      - Alexandrov Hussars (10 squadrons)
      - Polish Uhlans (10 squadrons)
    - 2nd Brigade: Generalmajor Friedrich von Korff
      - Pskov Dragoon Regiment (5 squadrons)
      - Moscow Dragoon Regiment (5 squadrons)
    - 3rd Brigade: Generalmajor Ivan Semenovich Dorokhov
      - Isoum Hussars (10 squadrons)
      - Olivopol Hussars (10 squadrons)
    - Artillery:
      - 1 Horse Battery (12 guns)

=== Reserves ===
- Infantry: Generallieutenant Peter Fedorovich Malutin
  - Brigade: Generalmajor Leontii Depreradovich II
    - Semenovsky Guard Regiment (3 battalions)(detached to Dokhturov)
    - Velikaluka Musketeer Regiment (3 battalions)(detached to Bagration)
    - Pernau Musketeer Regiment (3 battalions)(detached to Bagration)
  - Brigade: Generalmajor Pavel Bashutsky
    - Ismailov Guard Regiment (3 battalions)(detached to Dokhcturov)
    - Guard Grenadier Regiment (3 battalions)(detached to Dokhturov)
    - Kexholm Musketeer Regiment (3 battalions)(detached to Bagration)
- 14th Division: General Somorov
  - 1st Brigade: Generalmajor Ilya Ivanovich Alekseyev
    - Riazan Musketeer Regiment (3 battalions)
  - 2nd Brigade: Generalmajor Karl Maksimovich Herzdorf
    - Ouglich Musketeer Regiment (3 battalions)
    - Sophia Musketeer Regiment (3 battalions)
  - 3rd Brigade
    - Tula Musketeer Regiment (3 battalions)
    - Wilna Musketeer Regiment (3 battalions)
  - Artillery
    - l 12pdr Foot Artillery battery, 2 6pdr Foot Artilery batteries
- Cavalry: Generalmajor Mikhail Petrovich Dolgorukov
  - Kazan Dragoon Regiment (5 squadrons)
  - Riga Dragoon Regiment (5 squadrons)
  - Courland Dragoon Regiment (5 squadrons)

== Sources ==
- Millar, Stephen. "French Order of Battle for Friedland: 14 June 1807". Napleon Series.
- Mik̕aberije, Alek̕sandre (2005). The Russian officer corps in the Revolutionary and Napoleonic Wars: 1792 - 1815. Staplehurst: Spellmount. ISBN 1-86227-269-7.
- Nafziger, George. "French Order of Battle at Friedland" (PDF). Napleon Series.
- Nafziger, George. "Russian Order of Battle at Friedland" (PDF). Napleon Series.
- Smith, Digby (1998). The Greenhill Napoleonic Wars data book. London: Greenhill Books. pp. 249–251. ISBN 1-85367-276-9.
