= Engelhardt family =

Baltic-German noble family of the Russian Empire

Arms of the von Engelhardt family

The Engelhardt family (German: Engelhardt; Russian: Энгельгардт) is a Baltic-German noble and baronial family of the former Russian Empire.

== Style ==
Engelhardt is a noble family with a German name, and such families are, in Germany, prepended with "von", and this was generally retained if the family moved into the Russian aristocracy, so that von Engelhardt (вон Энгельгардт in Russian ) is sometimes given as the family name. However, as Russian nobility does not use such a nobiliary particle, over time and depending on circumstances or family preference, this was sometimes dropped, so that the family name is sometimes written as just Engelhardt.

== History ==
The legendary founder of the Engelhardt dynasty, Carl Bernhard von Engelhardt (1159–1230), served as a knight in the Third Crusade, which was launched to liberate the Holy Sepulchre. During that campaign, he is said to have received the surname Engelhardt ('angelic strength') for saving the life of the French king Philip II Augustus in the Siege of Acre.

The documented origins of the family lie in Switzerland, where Heinrich von Engelhardt is mentioned in the years 1383–1390 as a citizen and councillor in Zurich. In the early fifteenth century, Georg von Engelhardt lived in Livonia. From him descend all the nobles and barons of the Engelhardt family in the Russian Empire.

The first Engelhardt to become a Russian subject was Werner von Engelhardt, who had previously served in the army of the Polish–Lithuanian Commonwealth. He converted to the Russian State religion, accepting Orthodoxy and taking the baptismal name, Yeremey Kasparovich Engelgardt. He died before 1672. His son Sigismund (Stepan, upon Orthodox baptism) was a Muscovite noble and stolnik (personal attendant upon the Tsar) and a lieutenant in the Smolensk gentry. Other sons of Werner (Yeremey) were Georg (Yuri) and Johann (Ivan), who also served as stolniks.

The noble family of Engelhardt is recorded in Book VI of the genealogy of the province of Smolensk, and its coat of arms is included in Part VI of the General Armorial. The baronial line of Engelhardt is recorded in Part V of the genealogy books of the provinces of Yaroslava, Ekaterinoslavskaya, and Kursk.

While most of the Baltic branches of the family remained predominantly Lutheran and Germanised, the other branches that lived in Russia became highly Russified and many family members had since converted to Orthodoxy.

== Accomplishments ==
The house of Engelhardt has been associate with numerous charitable works, including the construction of churches and hospitals, substantial donations to universities, public libraries and observatories, the donation of ancient manuscripts, and the provision of land for railway constructions and other public purposes, and the emancipation of serfs.

The Engelhardt name has been attached to a scientific institute in Moscow, the observatory of Kazan University, the gold medal of the Russian Academy of Sciences, the main railway station in Smolensk, a crater on the Moon, an asteroid, and a star in the constellation Cygnus.

== The Potemkin nieces ==
Elena Aleksandrovna, the sister of Grigory Potemkin, was married to Vasily Andreyevich von Engelhardt. Their six daughters, being nieces of Potemkin, were imperial favorites and featured prominently in the court of Catherine II and the subsequent reign. Potemkin doted on his nieces (and, it is generally assumed in the case of Barbara, Alexandra, and Catherine, had sexual relations) and bequeathed to them some of his great wealth.

The six Potemkin nieces were:

- Aleksandra von Engelhardt (1754–1838), who married Count Franciszek Ksawery Branicki (1730–1819).
- Barbara von Engelhardt (1757–1815), who married Prince Sergey Feodorovich Golitsyn (1749–1810).
- Anna Sofia von Engelhardt (175?–1820), who married Mikhail Mikhailovich Zhukov (1728–1803), Governor of Astrakhan.
- Nadejda von Engelhardt (1759–1823), whose first marriage in 1775 was to Colonel Pavel Alekseevich Izmaylov (d. 1781) and second to Peter Shepelev (1737–1828).
- Yekaterina von Engelhardt (1761–1829), whose first marriage was to Count Paul Martynovich Skavronsky (1757–1793) and second to Count Giulio Renato Litta (1763–1839).
- Tatiana von Engelhardt (1769–1841), whose first marriage was to Count Mikhail Sergeevich Potemkin (1744–1791), her mother's and her uncle's cousin, and second in 1793 to Prince Nikolai Borisovich Yusupov (1750–1831).

== Notable Engelhardts ==
- William Karpovich Engelhardt (alternately Wilhelm Heinrich Engelhardt or Vasily Karlovich Engelhardt)(1726–1797), general, and Lieutenant Governor of Vyborg.
- Vasily Vasilyevich Engelhardt (1755–1828), Lieutenant general in the Russo-Turkish War (1787–1792), and senator.
- Grigori Engelhardt (1759–1834), Russian general.
- Christoph von Engelhardt (1762–1831), Russian general.
- Georg von Engelhardt (1775–1862), Russian statesman, editor and author.
- Otto Moritz Ludwig von Engelhardt (1778–1842), professor of Mineralogy at Tartu University.
- Alexander Bogdanovich Engelhardt (1795–1859), baron, Russian lieutenant general, chief of southern military settlements.
- Sergey Petrovich Engelhardt (1795–1870), Governor of Mogilev.
- Valerian Engelhardt (1798–1856), general and civil engineer.
- Pavel Vasilyevich Engelhardt (1798–1849), nobleman, master of serf and servant Taras Shevchenko
- Nikolai Fedorovich Engelhardt (1799–1856), brother of Valerian F. Engelhardt, Lieutenant General and Commander of the 15th Infantry Division in the Sevastopol campaign of 1854–55.
- Olga von Engelhardt (1822-1894), principal of the Smolny Institute in Saint Petersburg from 1875 to 1886.
- Baron Gustav Moritz Constantin (1828–1881), professor and Dean of the Theological Faculty of the University of Dorpat.
- Vasily Pavlovich Engelhardt (1828–1915), astronomer, and chronicler of Suvorov's Swiss expedition.
- Alexander Nikolayevich Engelhardt (1832–1893), renowned scholar and agriculturalist.
- Helene von Engelhardt (1850–1910), poet and translator.
- Boris Alexandrovich Engelhardt (1877–1962), Russian military and political figure during the 1917 revolutions.
- Vladimir Alexandrovich Engelhardt (1894–1984), Soviet biochemist, academician of the Soviet Academy of Medical Sciences (1944), academician of the Soviet Academy of Sciences (1953), founder and the first director of the Institute of Molecular Biology of the Russian Academy of Sciences (later renamed the Engelhardt Institute of Molecular Biology in his honor)
- Nick Clegg (born 1967), former Deputy Prime Minister of the UK and former Leader of the Liberal Democrats, grandson of Baroness Kira von Engelhardt Clegg (1909–2005), great-grandson of Arthur von Engelhardt, Baron von Smolensk (1873–1912),, great-grandnephew of Baroness Moura Budberg.

== Sources ==
- "Энгельгардты" . Brockhaus and Efron Encyclopedic Dictionary (in Russian). 1906.
