= Engelhard (surname) =

Engelhard or Engellhard is a surname. Notable people with the surname include:

- Alexander Engelhard (born 1972), German politician
- Annette de la Renta (born 1939), American philanthropist, socialite and widow of fashion designer Oscar de la Renta; known as Annette Engelhard after adoption by Charles Engelhard Jr.
- Charles W. Engelhard Jr. (1917–1971), American industrialist
- Doris Engelhard (born 1949), German religious sister, last nun working in Europe as a brewmaster
- Georgia Engelhard (1906–1986), American mountain climber
- Hans A. Engelhard (1934–2008), German politician and jurist, former Federal Minister of Justice of Germany
- Hermann Engelhard (1903–1984), German middle-distance runner
- George Heinrich Engellhard, American 19th century fraktur artist
- Heinrich Engelhard (priest) (fl. 1476–1551), Swiss canon, humanist and supporter of the Reformation in Zürich
- Jane Engelhard (1917–2004), American philanthropist, wife of Charles Engelhard Jr.
- Konrad Engelhard (died after March 1525), Zürich councillor, military commander and bailiff
- Nina Engelhard (fl. 2024–present), German long-distance and mountain runner
- Philippine Engelhard (1756–1831), German poet
- Rudolf Engelhard (born 1950), German politician
- Wilhelm Engelhard (1813–1902), German sculptor and painter

== See also ==
- Engelhardt
