= Engelhard (disambiguation) =

Engelhard is an international Fortune 500 company.

Engelhard may also refer to:

== People ==
- Engelhard (surname)
- Engelhard de Pee (1560s–1605), German court painter
- Engelhard (bishop), Bishop of Naumburg from 1206 to 1242

== Places ==
- Mount Engelhard, a mountain in Jasper National Park, Alberta, Canada
- Engelhard, North Carolina, United States, a census-designated place
- Engelhard Dam, a dam on the Letaba River in Kruger National Park, Limpopo, South Africa

== See also ==
- Engelhart, a surname
- Engelhardt (disambiguation)
