= Englehardt =

Englehardt is a surname. Notable people with the surname include:

- Elaine Englehardt (born 1953), American philosopher
- Fred Englehardt (1879–1942), American long and triple jumper
- John Englehardt (born 1987), American fiction writer and educator

== See also ==
- Engelhardt
- Engelhart
- Englehart
