= Engelhardt (disambiguation) =

Engelhardt is a surname. It may also refer to:

- Engelhardt Ice Ridge, Antarctica
- 4217 Engelhardt, an asteroid
- Engelhardt or Engel'gardt (crater), a crater on the Moon
- Engelhardt, a type of collapsible lifeboat - see Lifeboats of the Titanic
