= Alexander Engelhardt =

Alexander Engelhardt may refer to:

- Alexander Bogdanovich Engelhardt (1795–1859), Russian baron and general
- Alexander Nikolayevich Engelhardt (1832–1893), Russian scholar and agriculturalist
