= Eagleheart =

Eagleheart may refer to:

- Eagleheart (song) by Stratovarius (2002)
- Eagleheart (TV series) (2011–14)

== See also ==
- Engleheart
