= Englehart (disambiguation) =

Englehart is a town in the Canadian province of Ontario.

Englehart may also refer to:

== Locations ==
- Englehart River, in Timiskaming District in northeastern Ontario, Canada
- Englehart railway station, in the town of Englehart in Ontario, Canada
- Englehart (Dave's Field) Aerodrome, adjacent to Englehart, Ontario, Canada

== People ==
- Bob Englehart (born 1945), editorial cartoonist for the Hartford Courant since December 15, 1980
- Harry Englehart, former Democratic member of the Pennsylvania House of Representatives
- Jacob Lewis Englehart (1847–1921), oil refiner and founder of Imperial Oil
- John Englehart or Joseph John Englehart (1867–1915), American landscape painter
- Steve Englehart (born 1947), American comic book writer
- Steve Englehart (American football) (born 1977), American football player and coach

== See also ==
- Engleheart, a surname
