= Engelbert =

Engelbert may refer to:

- Engelbert (name), including a list of people with the name
- Engelbert, Netherlands, a village in the municipality of Groningen, Netherlands

== See also ==
- Englebert (disambiguation)
- Engebret
