= Hans Leu the Elder =

Swiss painter

- Hans Leu der Ältere
- Born: c. 1460; Baden, Switzerland
- Died: 1507; Zurich, Switzerland
- Known for: Panel painting, mural painting
- Movement: Late Gothic art
- Spouse: Anna Frick
- Children: Hans Leu the Younger

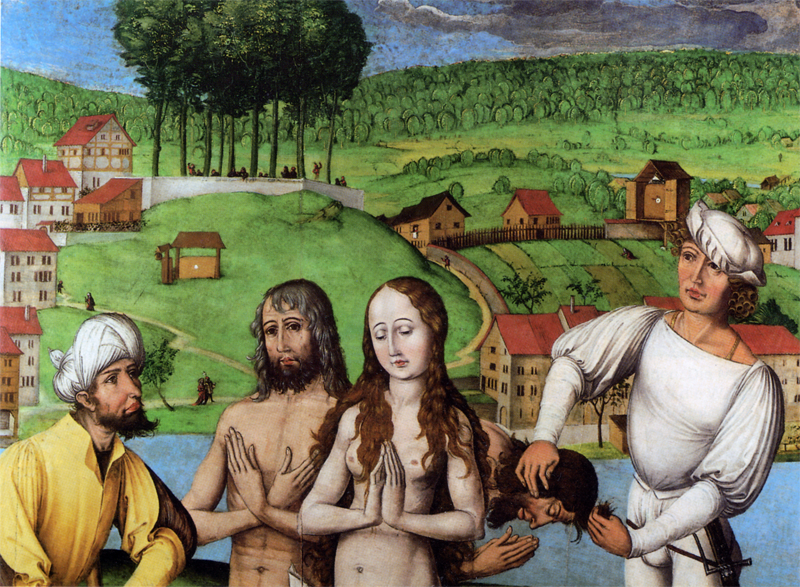
Martyrdom of Felix, Regula and Exuperantius, from the Grossmünster panels, 1497–1502

Hans Leu the Elder (German: Hans Leu der Ältere; c. 1460–1507) was a Swiss painter. He worked in panel and mural painting, and his principal surviving work is a series of Grossmünster panels depicting the martyrdom of Felix, Regula and Exuperantius against detailed views of Zurich. His work contributed to a brief flourishing of late Gothic painting there, and his workshop was later continued by his son, Hans Leu the Younger.

== Biography ==
Hans Leu the Elder was born around 1460 in Baden. He moved to Zurich in 1488, following the early death of his father. He is documented as a painter in Zurich from that year. Nothing is known about his training. Constance and Basel have been suggested as possible places connected with his training and journeyman years.

Leu is named in the Grossmünster building accounts of 1489 and appears in the records as a citizen of Zurich three years later. He received commissions from public institutions and private patrons in the city.

Leu married Anna Frick of Zurich. He died there in 1507. Anna Frick continued the workshop after his death. It later passed to their son, the painter and draughtsman Hans Leu the Younger.

== Work ==
Leu worked in both panel and mural painting. From 1497 to 1501, he painted a series of panels for the chapel associated with the tomb of Zurich’s patron saints in the Grossmünster. Five panels from the series survived the Zurich iconoclasm of 1523, possibly because they had been privately commissioned. They originally depicted Felix, Regula and Exuperantius together with scenes of their martyrdom, set against detailed views of Zurich. Around 1566, the lower sections were removed and parts of the paintings were altered to form a continuous city panorama. The surviving panels are held by the Swiss National Museum in Zurich, where they have been on display since 1898.

Comparison with this well-documented commission has enabled scholars to attribute several additional works to Leu, including some marked with a carnation symbol associated with the Carnation Masters. Technical examination carried out during the 1981–1982 restoration further strengthened the attribution of the panels to Leu. His work remained rooted in the late Gothic tradition, although the views of Zurich introduced a more naturalistic treatment of the observed environment. His work contributed to a brief flourishing of late Gothic painting in Zurich.

Works securely attributed to Leu are held by the Swiss National Museum and Kunsthaus Zürich. Other works associated with his workshop are held in collections including the Swiss National Museum, the Staatliche Kunsthalle Karlsruhe and the Episcopal Collection in St Gallen.

== Gallery ==
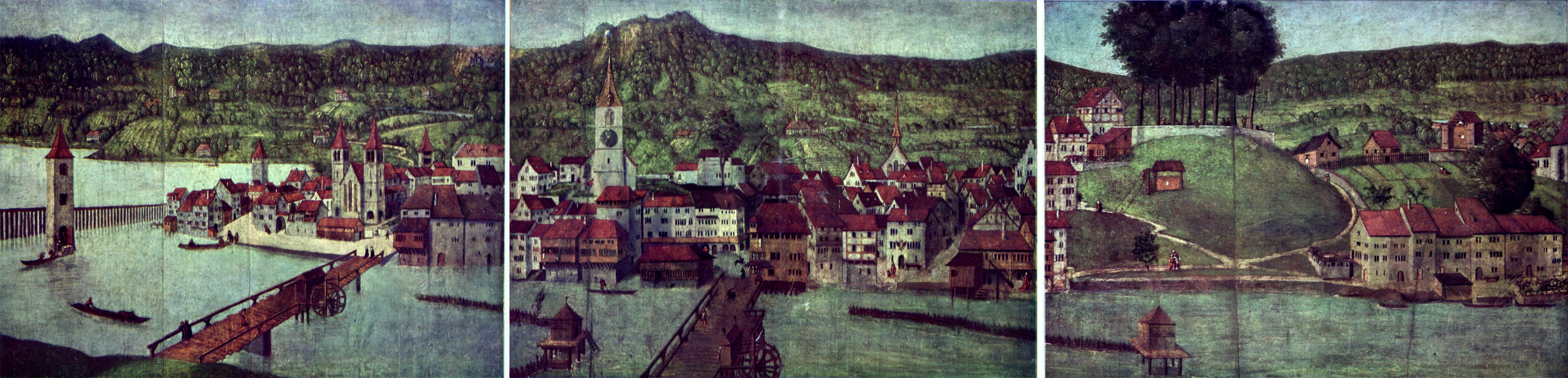
Grossmünster panels with a view of Zurich, late 15th century
