= Wolf von Engelhardt =

German geologist and mineralogist

- Born: 9 February 1910; Tartu, Governorate of Livonia, Russian Empire
- Died: 4 December 2008 (aged 98); Tübingen, Germany
- Awards: Hans-Stille-Medaille (1973); Gustav-Steinmann-Medaille (1984)
- Scientific career
- Fields: Geologist, Mineralogist

Wolf Jürgen Baron von Engelhardt (9 February 1910, Tartu – 4 December 2008, Tübingen) was a German geologist and mineralogist.

Baron von Engelhardt was a descendant of a Baltic German noble family Engelhardt.

== Biography ==
In the years 1929-1935, he began the study of natural sciences, in particular geology, mineralogy and chemistry at the Universities of Halle, Berlin, and Göttingen. In Halle, he became a member of the Corps Guestphalia Halle. He received his doctorate on September 18, 1935, from the mineralogist Victor Moritz Goldschmidt with the topic geochemistry of barium.

From 1935 to 1938 he worked as a research assistant at the Mineralogical Institute of the University of Rostock. On July 12, 1939, he obtained the habilitation at the University of Göttingen where he studied decay and construction of minerals in northern German Fuller's earth. From 1939 to 1944 he was a scientific assistant at the Mineralogical Institute of the University of Göttingen with the mineralogist Carl Wilhelm Correns. From 1939 he was also employed at the University of Göttingen as a Privatdozent.

He was appointed lecturer in 1944. With the representation at a chair in 1944, the appointment as associate professor. From 1947 to 1952 he led the research and development department at the oil company union Elwerath in Hanover. From 1952 to 1957 he was able to work at the University of Göttingen as honorary professor, and then from 1 November 1957 as full professor to take over the management of the Mineralogical-Petrographic Institute of the University of Tübingen. From 1963 to 1964 Engelhardt was rector of the University of Tübingen. He retired in 1978. He then continued journalistic work in his field of mineralogy.

== Military service and Political affiliation. ==
From 1933 to 1934 and in 1939 he was a member of the Sturmabteilung. From 1937 to 1942 he was temporarily employed in the military service to then serve from 1942 to 1945 at the Sicherheitsdienst. From the year 1940, he was a member of the Reichsdozentenschaft, a subdivision of the NSDAP.

He belonged to the National Socialist German Lecturers League and the National Socialist Old Masters Association from 1942 on.

== Named after him ==
The asteroid 4217 Engelhardt is named in his honour.
