= Heinrich Engelhard (priest) =

Swiss humanist and Protestant reformer

- Born: fl. 1476
- Died: 1551; Zurich
- Occupations: Canon, theologian, humanist
- Known for: Support of Huldrych Zwingli and the Reformation in Zürich

Heinrich Engelhard (fl. 1476–1551) was a Swiss canon, humanist, and supporter of the Reformation in Zürich. Of patrician origin from Zurich, he played a role in the city's religious transformation during the early 16th century through his support of Huldrych Zwingli and later Heinrich Bullinger.

== Biography ==
=== Early life and education ===
Heinrich Engelhard was the son of Johan Engelhard, who served on the Zürich Council from 1478 to 1498. He was the brother of Konrad Engelhard. Engelhard pursued his studies at the University of Heidelberg and the University of Bologna, where he earned a doctorate in canon law in 1496.

=== Ecclesiastical career ===
First mentioned in 1476 as an expectant (awaiting a canon's prebend) at Beromünster, Engelhard became a canon there from 1480 to 1521. From 1496, he served as vicar of the Fraumünster, and from 1513 to 1521 as canon at the Grossmünster.

Engelhard decorated his house in the humanist and antique style then in fashion, including a fresco by Hans Leu the Younger. His patrician background and education placed him among the notable figures of his time.

=== Role in the Reformation ===
Engelhard supported Zwingli from the beginning in his campaigns concerning Lent, iconoclasm, communion, and the consistoire. He authored expert opinions and publications on these matters. He served as president of the consistoire from 1525 to 1540.

From 1531 to 1536, Engelhard assisted Heinrich Bullinger (1504–1575) during his addresses to the council. Weakened by age, he was often replaced by the archdeacon of the Grossmünster, Kaspar Megander. His precise influence on humanism and the Reformation in Zurich remains difficult to assess.

== Bibliography ==
- Meyer, A. Zürich und Rom, 1986, p. 281
- Vogelsanger, P. Zürich und sein Fraumünster, 1994, pp. 293–297
