= Georg von Engelhardt =

Russian politician (1775–1862)

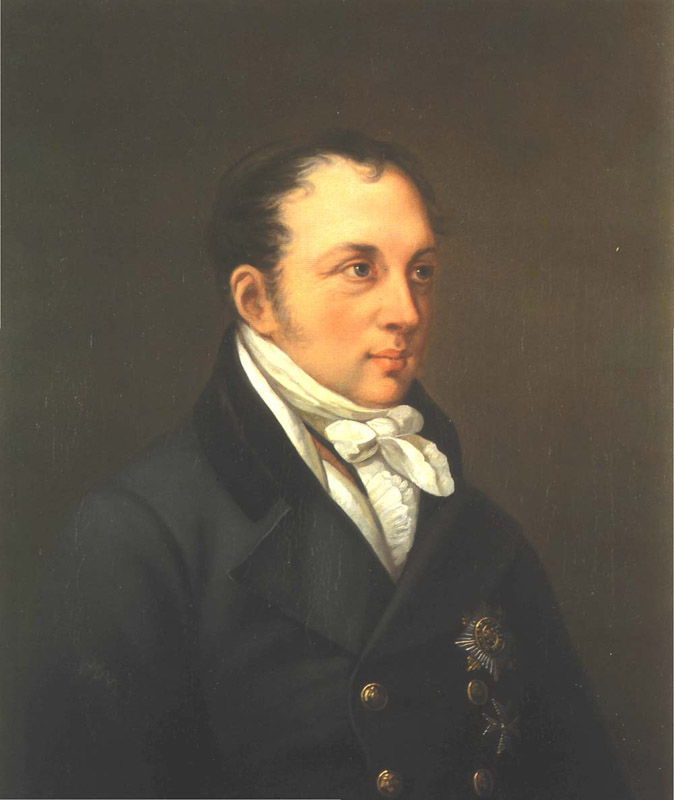
- Posthumous portrait by Pavel Porokhovnikov

Personal details
- Born: 12 August 1775 Riga, Russian Empire
- Died: 15 January 1862 (aged 86) Saint Petersburg, Russian Empire

Georg von Engelhardt (Russian: Его́р Анто́нович Энгельга́рдт, romanized: Yegor Antonovich Engelgardt; 1775–1862) was a Russian statesman, and a noted member of the Baltic-German Engelhardt family.

== Biography ==
He was born in Riga. He went to Saint Petersburg in 1790 and six years later secured a post in the Department of Foreign Affairs. He became Undersecretary of State in 1801 under Alexander I in the newly created Imperial Council. He was made director of the Pedagogical Institute in 1811 and of the Lyceum at Tsarskoye Selo in 1816. His liberalism, however, led to his removal in 1823.

== Literary work ==
From 1838 to 1852 he edited the Russische Landwirtschaftliche Zeitung (“Russian Agricultural News”). He published Russische Miscellan zur Kenntnis Russlands und seiner Bewohner (“Russian miscellany of facts about Russia and its inhabitants,” 4 vols., 1828–32) and edited the manuscript journals of the explorer Ferdinand von Wrangel, which he issued in Reise längs der Nordküste von Sibirien und auf dem Eismeer (“Trip along the north coast of Siberia and the Arctic Ocean,” 1839).
