= Helene von Engelhardt =

Baltic German poet, writer and translator

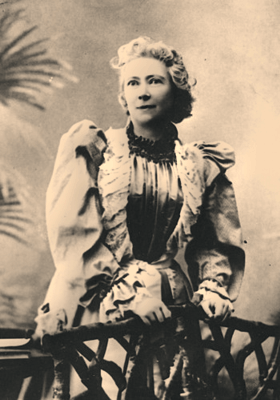
Helene von Engelhardt

Helene von Engelhardt (sometimes referred to by her married name Helene Pabst, sometimes Helene von Engelhardt-Schnellenstein; 2 September [O.S. 21 August] 1850 – 7 July [O.S. 24 June] 1910) was a Baltic German poet, writer and translator.

== Life and work ==
Helene von Engelhardt was a member of the Baltic aristocratic family Engelhardt. She was born in Vileikiai, East Prussia (now Lithuania) and moved to Courland with her family when she was five. She had a happy childhood and was at first educated in her home, and then in Jelgava. Here she began her literary career with translations from Russian (Pushkin and Lermontov), Latvian folk poetry as well as French and English poetry into German. She also took private lessons in Latin. In 1869–1870 she was in Stuttgart, and became acquainted with writers Wolfgang Menzel, Ferdinand Freiligrath and Friedrich von Bodenstedt. In 1870 she moved with her family to Riga, where she began to study Greek. In the city she also met and married in 1876 German pianist and composer Louis Pabst (1846–1921). From 1878 the couple travelled widely, playing the piano together at concerts, and spent time in Vienna, Budapest, Leipzig, Stuttgart, London, Saint Petersburg and Moscow, and spent three years in Melbourne.

== Selected writings ==
- (1885): Gedichte, in: Richter, Eugen (1885): Dichterstimmen aus Baltischen Landen
- (1906): Zeichnungen eines Fahrenden. Novellen, Studien und Erinnerungsblätter. 2 vols.
- (1903): Meine Stärke und mein Schild
- (1894): Gedichte
- (1894): Windesrauschen. Epische Dichtungen.
- (1870): Morgenroth
- (1884): Normanische Balladen

== Sources ==
- "Энгельгардт, Елена" . Brockhaus and Efron Encyclopedic Dictionary (in Russian). 1906.
