= Engelhart =

Engelhart is a surname. Notable people with this surname include:

- Alette Engelhart (1896–1984), Norwegian housewives' leader
- Billy Engelhart (born 1942), American former racing driver
- Catherine Engelhart Amyot (1845–1926), Danish painter
- Christian Engelhart (born 1986), German racing driver
- Edwin Engelhart (born 1976), Dutch basketball player
- Nils Engelhart (c. 1668–1719), Norwegian Lutheran priest
- Stanley Engelhart (1910–1979), English sprinter
- Thomas Engelhart (1850–1905), Norwegian jurist and politician

== See also ==
- Englehart
- Engelhardt
- Engelhard (disambiguation)
