= Engebret =

Engebret is a name of Norwegian origin. Notable individuals bearing this name include:

- Engebret E. Lobeck, Norwegian-American politician
- Engebret Olsen Moe, Norwegian member of Parliament
- Engebret Skogen, Norwegian rifle shooter
- Engebret Soot, Norwegian engineer

== See also ==
- Engebret Café
- Engelbert
