= Otto Engelhardt =

German engineer and diplomat

- Born: Otto Engelhardt; 7 August 1866; Braunschweig, Germany
- Died: 14 September 1936 (aged 70); Seville, Spain
- Citizenship: German
- Occupations: Engineer; Diplomat
- Known for: Honorary consul in Seville

Honorary consul in Seville
- In office 1903–1919

Otto Engelhardt (7 August 1866 – 14 September 1936) was a German engineer and diplomat. He was a director of the Sevillian Electricity Company and the Seville Tram Company and honorary consul of the city. In 1932, he renounced German nationality due to the triumph of Nazism, and was shot dead four years later as a victim of the repression of the rebels in the Spanish Civil War.

== Early life and education ==
Otto Engelhardt was born on 7 August 1866 in Braunschweig, Duchy of Brunswick, German Confederation, as the son of Federico and Ana. After studying engineering in Germany, he worked as an engineer at AEG in Berlin, being the director of the Strassenbahn und Electrizitätswerke in Anhalt.

== Engineering career ==
When AEG invested capital in the Spanish Sociedad Sevillana de Electricidad, SA, founded on 23 July 1894, they named Engelhardt as its director, moving to the Spanish city, a town that he would never leave. During his tenure as director, the company had exceptional development; for example, it went from 28 employees in 1898 to 465 in 1910, and the wiring increased from 48,000 meters to 180,000, and he managed to wire the city and bring light where there used to be candles or oil lamps.

Don Otto, as his Sevillian countrymen called him, later took charge of the Seville Tram company, where he reduced the working hours in winter for drivers and collectors, who dedicated an emotional plaque to him in gratitude. There, he implemented optimal working conditions for his staff and the subsequent applause of the unions. His dismissal, due to pressure from the 'allies' for being German, earned the gratitude of the workers with a massive tribute. He lived in Seville for 35 years, seeking the well-being of the people of Seville through the development of urban transportation and the lighting of its streets, being honored several times for his contributions to the improvement of Seville's infrastructure, as well as all the city's modernization projects. For instance, on 18 December 1910, the workers and senior officials of the Sevillian Electricity Company paid tribute to him, to "celebrate the great triumphs achieved in the performance of his technical and administrative management"; the event was attended by Raúl Noel, advisor of the company, the two sons of Engelhardt, and the workers of the various departments.

Engelhardt was named honorary consul of Germany in Seville in 1903, a position he held until his resignation at his request on 23 December 1919. In 1916, he requested help from the Ministry of Foreign Affairs to build a German school, since on the occasion of Portugal's entry into the First World War, there were many German families in Portugal and teachers from the German school in Lisbon, but this request was rejected by the Ministry and the students had to go to the German School in Madrid. He believed in pacifism, human rights and freedom to its ultimate consequences, helping Spain remain neutral during the First World War, when he, as a consul, managed to prevent a serious sabotage attempt by a German navy officer against Spanish ships in the port of Seville, a plot that included consular custody of some explosives that were hidden. He later said that "a consul should not get involved in military enterprises, only deal with peaceful things in the service of the nation". He was decorated on numerous occasions for his actions in favor of his country. Among his activities, he raised funds to care for the wounded during the Rif War, which earned him the Order of Isabella the Catholic from King Alfonso XIII.

After his managerial period, his entrepreneurial spirit led him to found the Sanavida pharmaceutical company located in the town of San Juan de Aznalfarache, a laboratory that marketed medications and drugs such as Ceregumil, Nervidin, Neocrom, and Epivomin, which was used for the treatment of epilepsy, insomnia, pregnancy vomiting, and nervous disorders in general.

== Sporting career ==
As a regenerationist and sports lover, Engelhardt organized several football matches between the local team Sevilla FC and the German employees of the company he directed, some of whom later became members of Sevilla FC.

== Criticism of Nazism ==
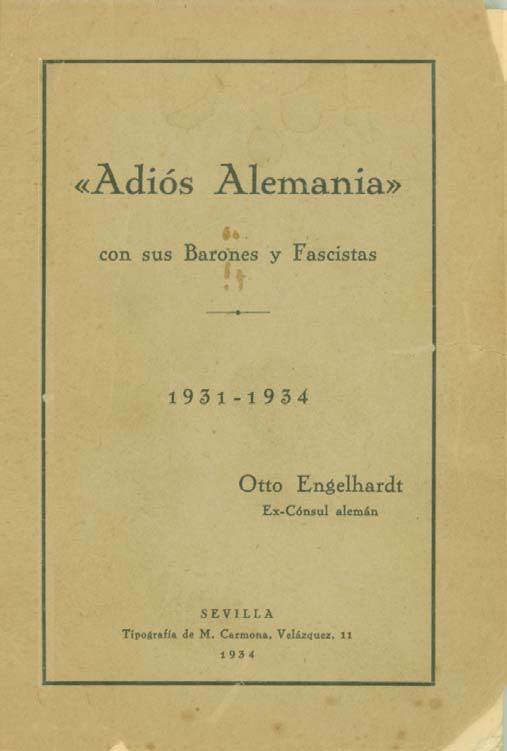
Cover of "Goodbye, Germany, with its barons and fascists" (1931–1934).

The rise of Nazism sickened him, and thus, in 1932, Engelhardt renounced German nationality and obtained Spanish nationality, becoming a "loyal citizen of the Spanish Republic". The Sevillians greeted the new Spanish compatriot with wholehearted affection since rarely had a foreigner enjoyed as much sympathy in Seville as those that Don Otto had earned.

Engelhardt was a regular columnist for the newspaper El Liberal de Sevilla, which had an innovative spirit, being a precursor of the most modern trends in the current press, and which was directed by his friend José Laguillo. Engelhardt's contrary position regarding National Socialism, which was gaining followers in his native Germany, made him unpopular among his people, and after Hitler's rise as chancellor in 1933, he received criticism and threats from the new German government for his articles. On 15 October 1932, he published the article "The Dictatorship in Germany", in which he stated, among other things, "Thank God that I live now as a Spanish citizen, under the protection of a Government that is as far from fascism as I am from Hitler... and their princes! I do not stop loving my Germany and I sincerely wish for it that happy days will soon come without Hitler, without barons and princes; truly and prosperous republican days as the peaceful German people deserve". The German consul at that time, Gustav Draeger, was a fervent Prussian Nazi and pressured the director of El Liberal de Sevilla, José Laguillo, not to publish his articles. Engelhardt even telegraphed Hitler himself on 4 August 1934 with a brief message: 'down with fascism', and wrote a revealing book, Goodbye Deutschland (1934), in which he explained very clearly the reasons that led him to request Spanish naturalization, being highly praised by the democratic press of his native country. Despite acknowledging that he felt safe in Spain, that same year he asked his new compatriots for help and protection, after discovering that he appeared on a Civil Guard list as a "man of care".

Engelhardt always declared himself a pacifist and republican, and did not stop supporting those fleeing the Nazi regime, and in 1933, he even helped German emigrants who were trying to flee their country persecuted by the totalitarian regime. He was being closely monitored and investigated by the German consulate and the German embassy in Madrid, from where reports of his activities came out, since 1929 when he began to house and help exiles from Nazism in Seville. The last report that appears in the Political Archive is a clipping from the newspaper El Liberal, dated 20 November 1935, which mentions a party that Don Otto gave at his house in San Juan de Aznalfarache, in which the first German revolution, decorating the house with the "legitimate German flag of the colors black, red and yellow".

== Personal life ==
Engelhardt married the German Anna Holtz, and the couple had two sons, Conrado and Otto. Holtz was very modern for the mentality of the time in Spain, scandalizing the people of Seville because she rode a bicycle, to the point of sometimes having stones thrown at her. He later married for the second time, the Sevillian Mercedes Granados.

== Death and legacy ==
On 19 August 1936, Engelhardt was admitted to the Cinco Llagas Hospital, in the San Cosme room, bed number 37, due to phlebitis, but he was discharged on 12 September 1936, and on that same day, he was taken to the Public Order Delegation, located on Jesús del Gran Poder Street, and there he was detained until his execution. By order of the fearsome General Queipo de Llano, Engelhardt was shot two days later on 14 September 1936, at the age of 70. His body is believed to have been thrown into the Pico Reja grave. Afterwards they ensured that his life and works fell into oblivion, but his family managed to recover and restore his memory, with his great-granddaughter Ruth later stating that they "have not yet been able to obtain proof that the order for him to be shot came from Hitler". The family's reparative effort was sponsored by private entities, which included photographs, paintings, books, and objects related to his history and daily life.

In the said hospital, there was a commemorative plaque in which the Provincial Council of Seville thanked him for having paid for the tiling of the San José room. "Discovering Otto" (2020) was a documentary directed by Ricardo Barby that premiered at the Romero San Juan Theater. In October 2021, an exhibition called "Discovering Otto Engelhardt", also repeating the title of the documentary, was organized by the San Juan de Aznalfarache City Council and the House of the Province-Diputación of Seville and held at the Plaza del Triunfo to show the visitors the most unknown aspects of his biography. There is also an award inspired by his life that recognizes and honors people who represent the same values and ideals today as Engelhardt did a century ago.

The house where Engelhardt lived for many years, located in the town of San Juan de Aznalfarache and known as Finca Chaboya, is still standing, remaining in the family until 1984, when they sold it to a private individual, who restored the house and returned it to its original appearance. It is now a protected building by a subsidiary municipal rule by which only "improvement and beautification works" can be carried out in the home. Despite this, it is currently in a state of abandonment and lamentable deterioration.
