= Johann Georg Veit Engelhardt =

German Protestant theologian (1791–1855)

Johann Georg Veit Engelhardt (November 12, 1791 – September 13, 1855), was a German Protestant theologian.

== Life ==
Born in Neustadt-on-the-Aisch, he was educated at University of Erlangen–Nuremberg, becoming the Professor of Theology in 1821. During the years 1845, 1847 and 1848 was the representative of his university in the diet at Munich.

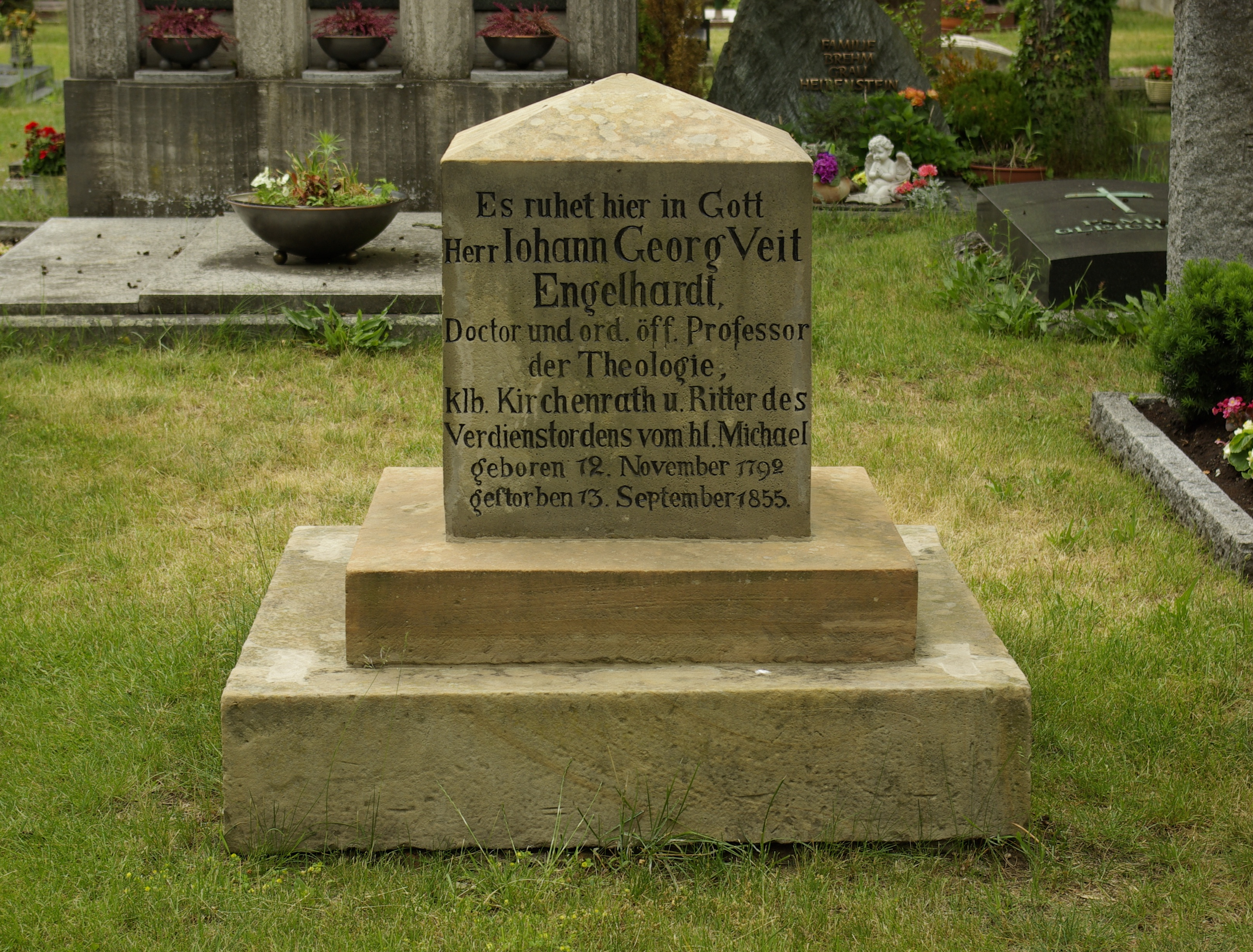
Gravesite of Engelhardt at the Neustädter Friedhof in Erlangen

== Works ==
His two great works were a Handbuch der Kirchengeschichte in 4 volumes (1833–1834), and a Dogmengeschichte in 2 volumes, (1839). Other works included a translation of the writings ascribed to Dionysius the Areopagite and Richard von St. Victor und Johannes Ruysbroek (referring to Richard of Saint Victor and John of Ruusbroec; 1838). He died at Erlangen on September 13, 1855.
