= Engelhard de Pee =

German court painter

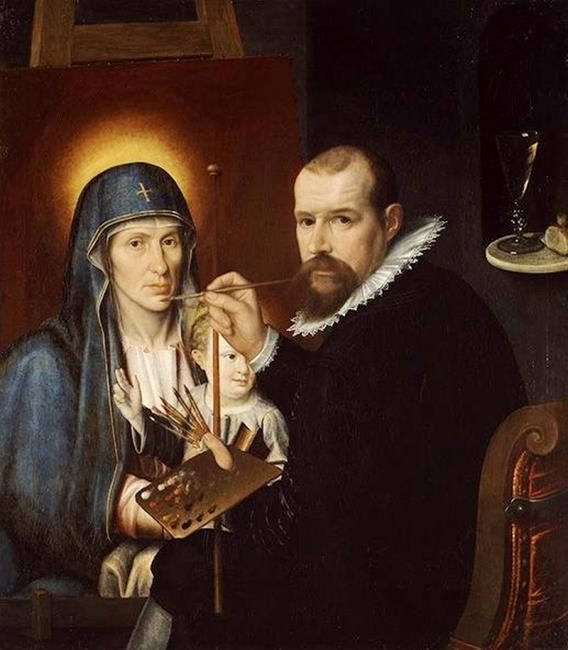
- Born: Brussels
- Died: 1605; Munich

Engelhard de Pee (1560s – 1605) was a German court painter to William V, Duke of Bavaria. After he abdicated and retired to a Jesuit monastery in 1597, Pee became court painter to his son Maximilian I, Elector of Bavaria.

Pee was born in Brussels but no evidence of birth records was ever discovered. He was possibly the father of Justus van Pee, the grandfather of Jan van Pee. Justus van Pee was reported to be trained as a painter by his father but became the secretary to Margaret of Parma instead.

He is best known for his 1601 self-portrait as Saint Luke Painting the Virgin, in which he portrays the Madonna in a modernized version of the Salus Populi Romani icon based on the legend of Luke's portrait of Mary. This reflected his Jesuit take on popular theological debates of his times. This was probably his masterpiece for the local guild as he was registered as master in the Munich Guild of St. Luke in 1601.

Pee died in Munich.
