= J.F. Englert =

American novelist

J. F. Englert is an American fiction novel writer, non-fiction writer, and screenwriter. He resides in Manhattan, New York. He is married to P. Englert, has a daughter named C. Englert, and a dog named R. Englert. After meeting and falling in love with his wife's Australian Labrador, J. F. Englert was inspired to write his fiction novel series, the Bull Moose Dog Run Mystery Series: which include A Dog About Town, A Dog Among Diplomats, and A Dog At Sea, which protagonize the dog narrator, Randolph, a Labrador Retriever.
