= Engelbert, Netherlands =

Engelbert
- Village
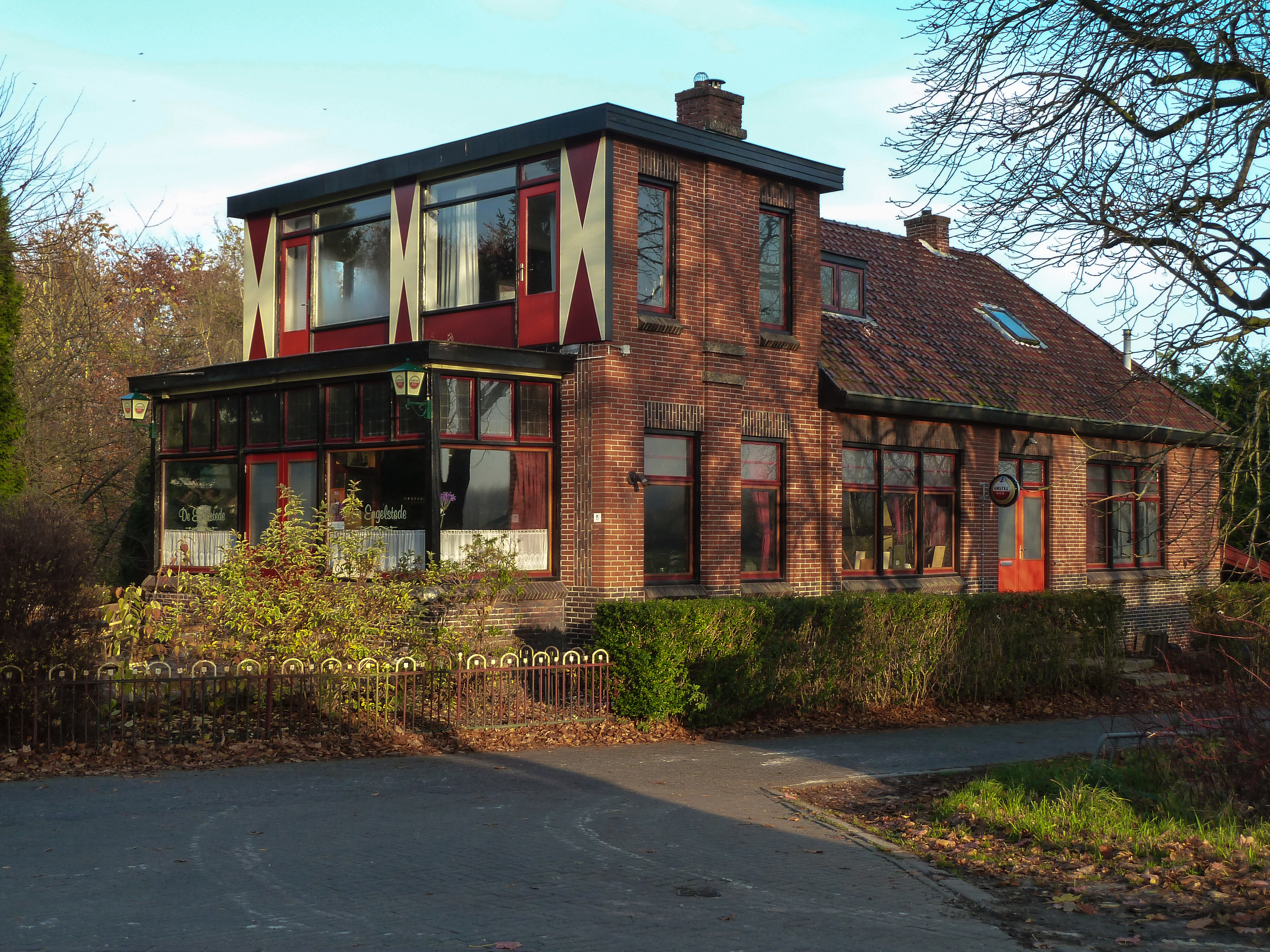
- Coffeeshop of the former railway station

- Location in the province of Groningen in the Netherlands Engelbert (Netherlands)
- Coordinates: 53.2074°N 6.6457°E
- Country: Netherlands
- Province: Groningen
- Municipality: Groningen

Area
  - Total: 3.36 km^{2} (1.30 sq mi)
- Elevation: 2.3 m (7.5 ft)

Population (2021)
  - Total: 890
  - Density: 260/km^{2} (690/sq mi)
- Time zone: UTC+1 (CET)
  - Summer (DST): UTC+2 (CEST)
- Postal code: 9723
- Dialing code: 050

Engelbert is a village in the Dutch province of Groningen. It is a part of the municipality of Groningen.

== History ==
The village was first mentioned in 1323 as "de Egniberde", and means "settlement of Egge (person)". Engelbert developed in the Early Middle Ages in the forest-rich moorland of the Hunze region. The area around Engelbert was gradually cultivated.

The Dutch Reformed church is an elongated church without transepts. The oldest parts date from the 13th and 14th century. The church was restored in 1779.

In 1811, Engelbert became part of the municipality of Noorddijk. The village was home to 193 people in 1840. A railway station opened in 1926 on the Groningen to Weiwerd railway line. A tall building in three parts was constructed to serve as railway station. The line closed in 1941, and the building is now a residential home.

In 1969, Engelbert became part of the municipality of Groningen. Since 2005, Engelbert is located within the Meerstad project, a planned suburban town. It is stated that Engelbert will retain its village identity, however the postal authorities have already placed Engelbert under Groningen, and in the statistics, the population of Engelbert is added to the total for the city of Groningen.

== Recreation ==
The natural swimming pool and camping Engelbert is located near the village. The pool contains many big carps (cyprinidae) and is up to 7 metres (23 ft) deep. It has a 5 metres (16 ft) high diving tower, and there is a lifeguard on duty between 13:00 and 18:00.

== Gallery ==
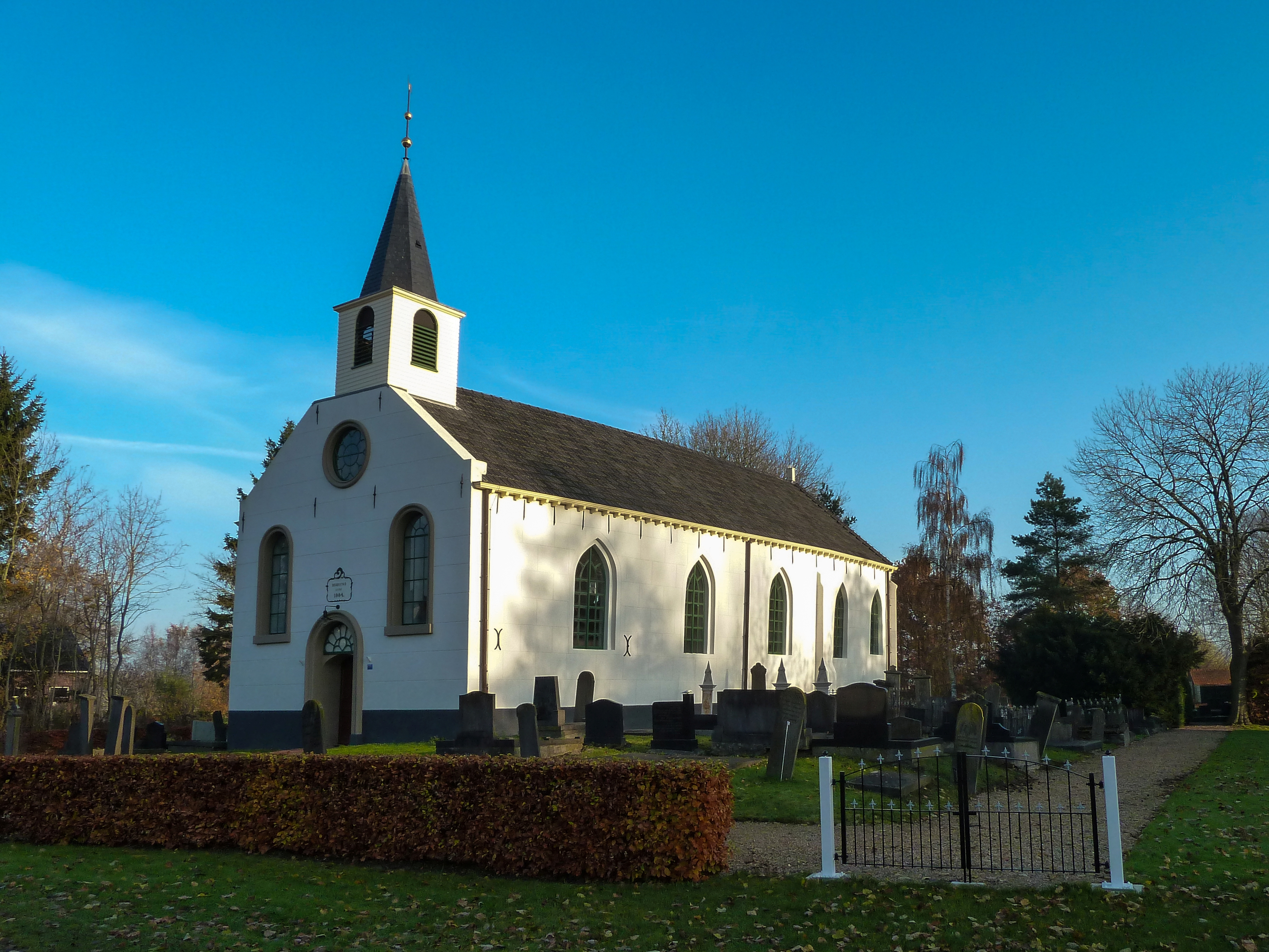
Church of Engelbert

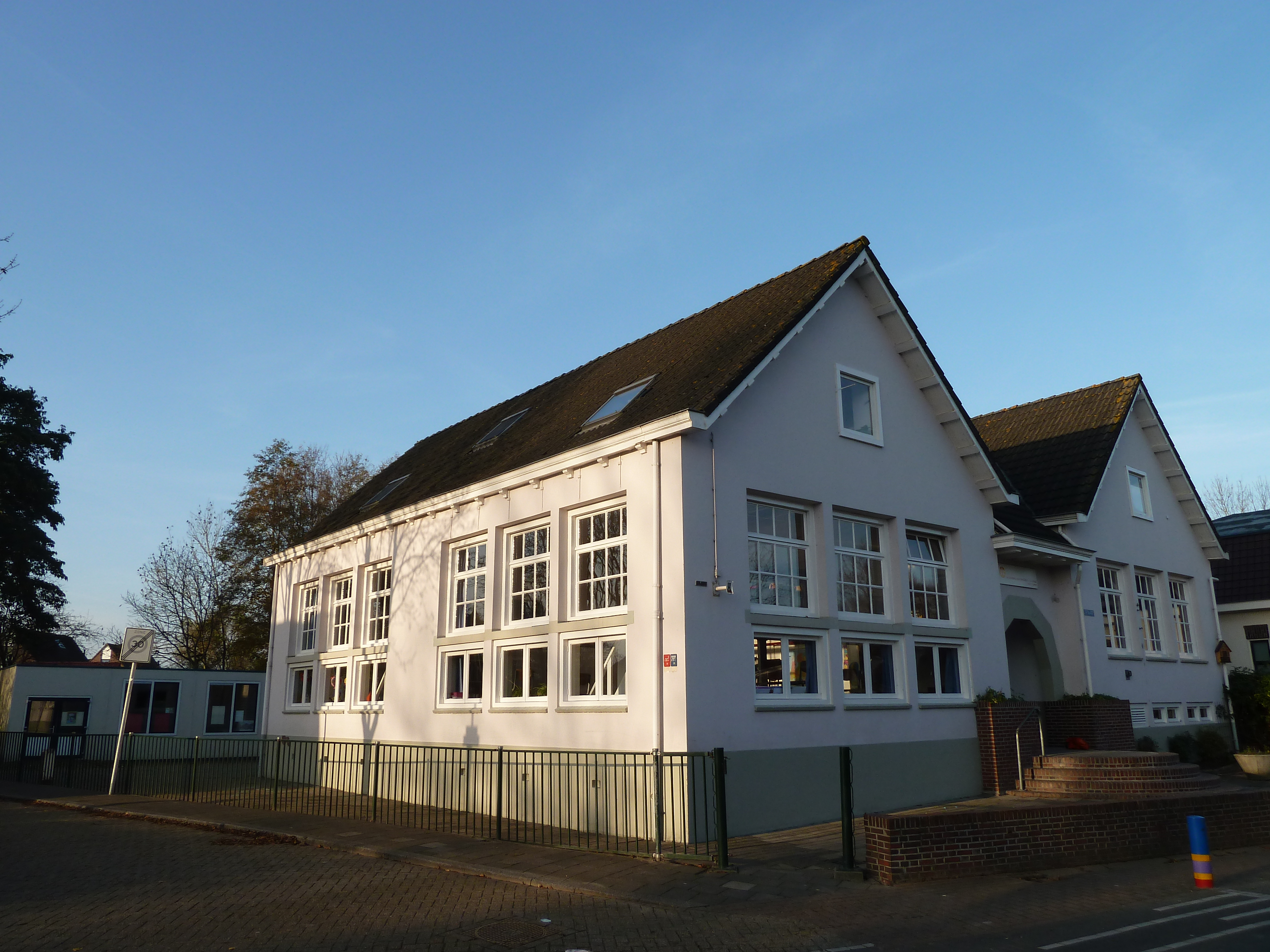
School in Engelbert

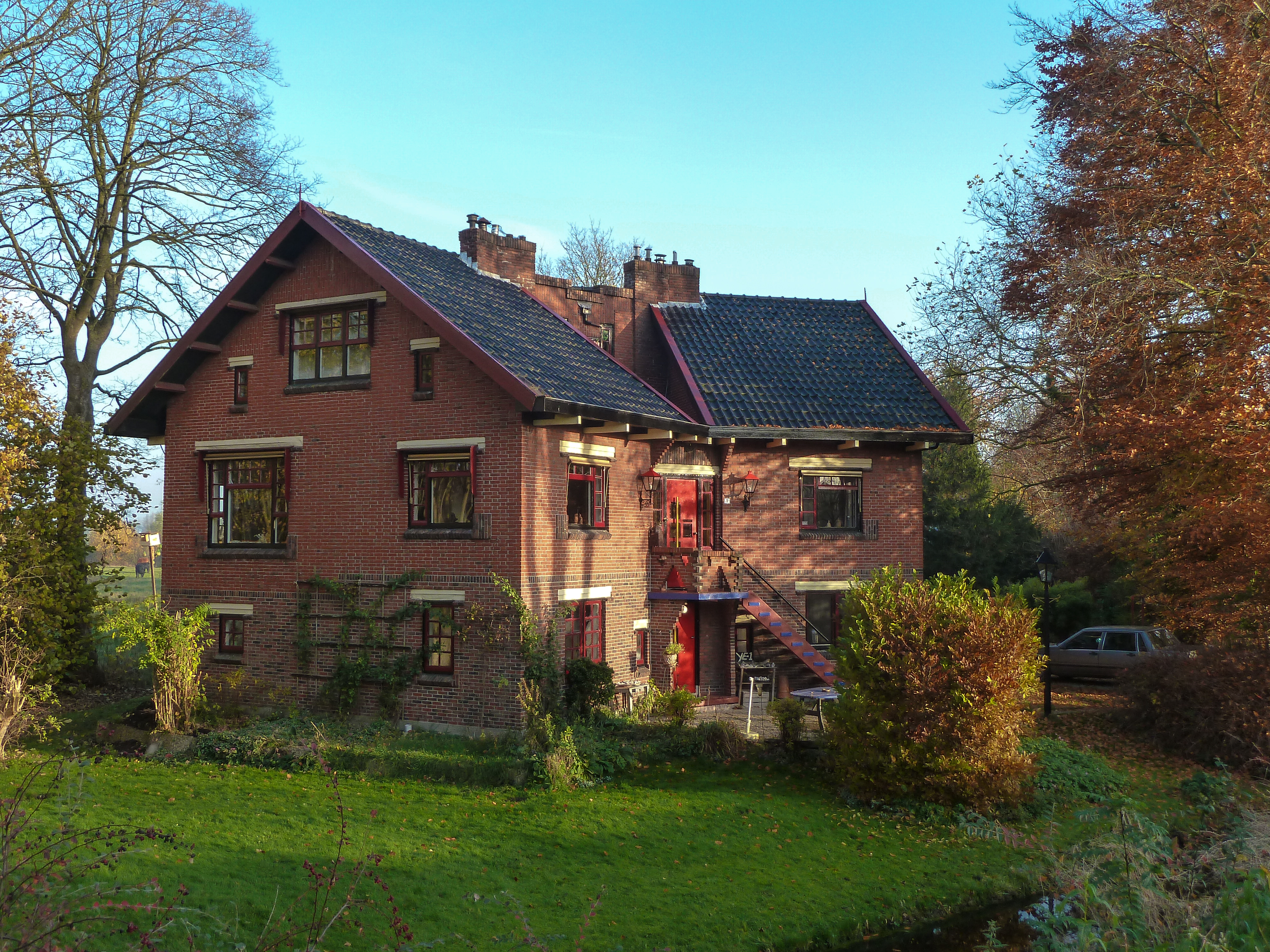
Clergy house

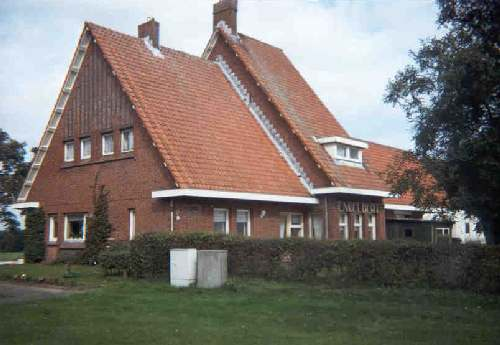
Former railway station
