= Hans Leu the Younger =

Swiss painter and soldier

Hans Leu the Younger (ca. 1490 – 24 October 1531) was a Swiss painter and soldier from Zurich.

== Biography ==
Born between c. 1485 and 1490, Leu was the son of Anna Frick and the painter Hans Leu the Elder, with whom he probably had his first training as an artist. He traveled in Nuremberg ca. 1510 where he worked in the studio of Albrecht Dürer, and he later may have worked with Hans Baldung in Freiburg im Breisgau. Leu took over his father's workshop after completing his journeyman's apprenticeship. By 1514 he had returned to Zürich, where he became the city's foremost painter.

As Zürich came under the influence of the iconoclastic church reformer Huldrych Zwingli, commissions for church decorations became scarce. Lacking sufficiently large commissions, Leu became a mercenary to support himself. He fought at the Battle of Marignano in 1515 and in the same year illegally enlisted in the army of Duke Ulrich of Württemberg, which led to his being brought to trial in Zurich. Much of Leu's work was destroyed by followers of Zwingli amid the iconoclasm of 1523. When the painter witnessed the destruction of a large part of his exclusively religious early work, as well as most of his father's work, he became an opponent of the Protestant Reformation and likely relocated his workplace to Catholic Lucerne.

In 1526-1527, Leu apparently reconciled himself to the new circumstances and returned to Protestant Zurich. Professionally, he turned to the new genre of landscape painting. Inspired by medieval religious art, his high-quality drawings and paintings of nature resemble the works of the German Danube school of Hans Baldung and Albrecht Altdorfer. In 1531, Leu participated in failed peace negotiations between the Protestant and Catholic cantons in Aarau. He was killed in combat on 24 October 1531 at the Battle of Gubel, during the Second War of Kappel.

== Works ==
Leu's surviving works include a small number of paintings and woodcuts, drawings of religious subjects, and landscape studies. Museums holding works by Leu include the Städel in Frankfurt and the Fogg Art Museum in Cambridge, Massachusetts, United States.

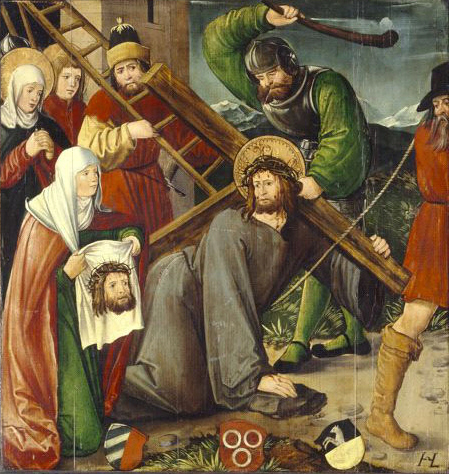
Christ Carrying the Cross, after 1515. Dedicated to the citizens of Zurich killed at the Battle of Marignano

Portrait of a gentleman, c. 1516

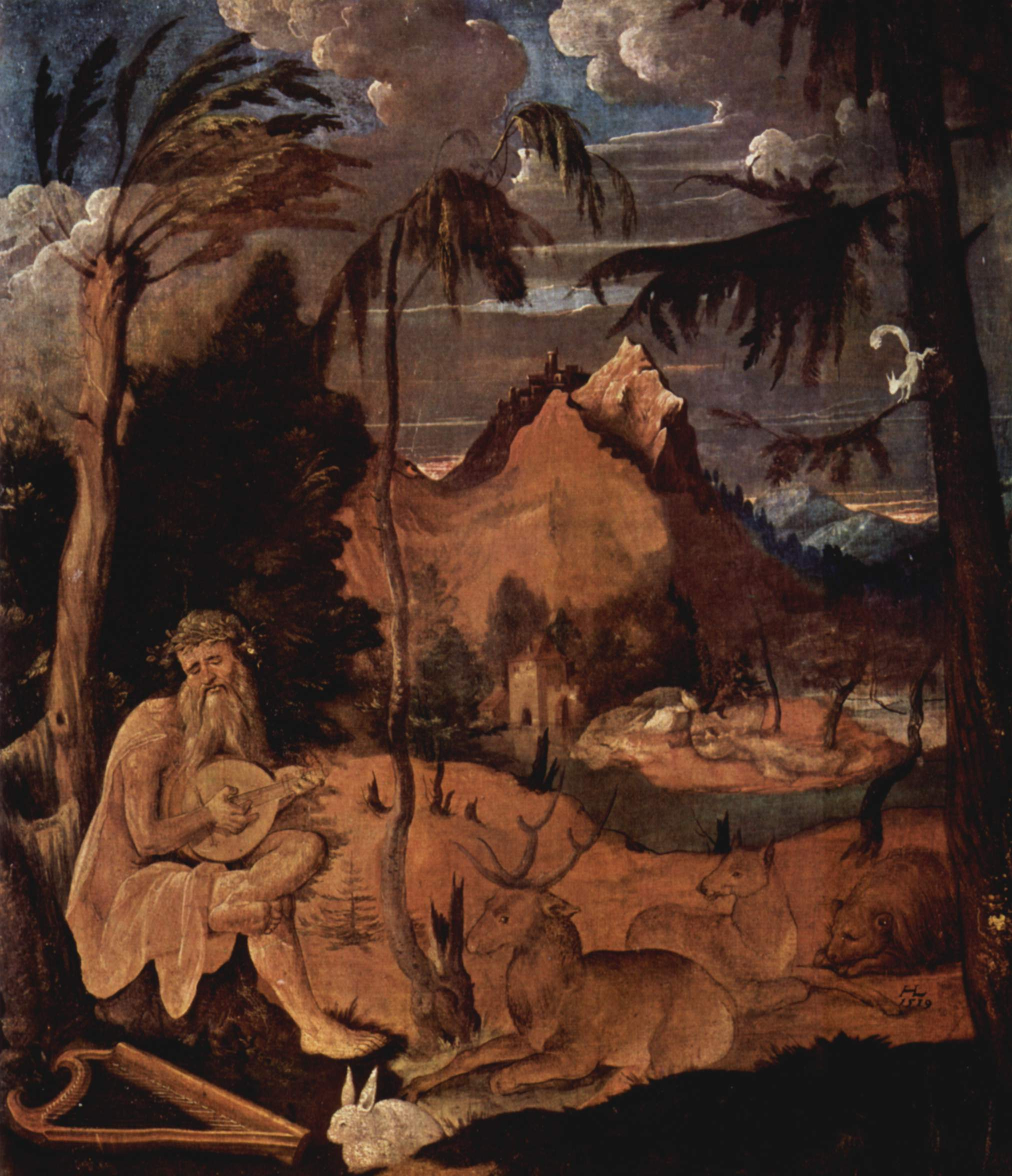
Orpheus and the Animals, 1519

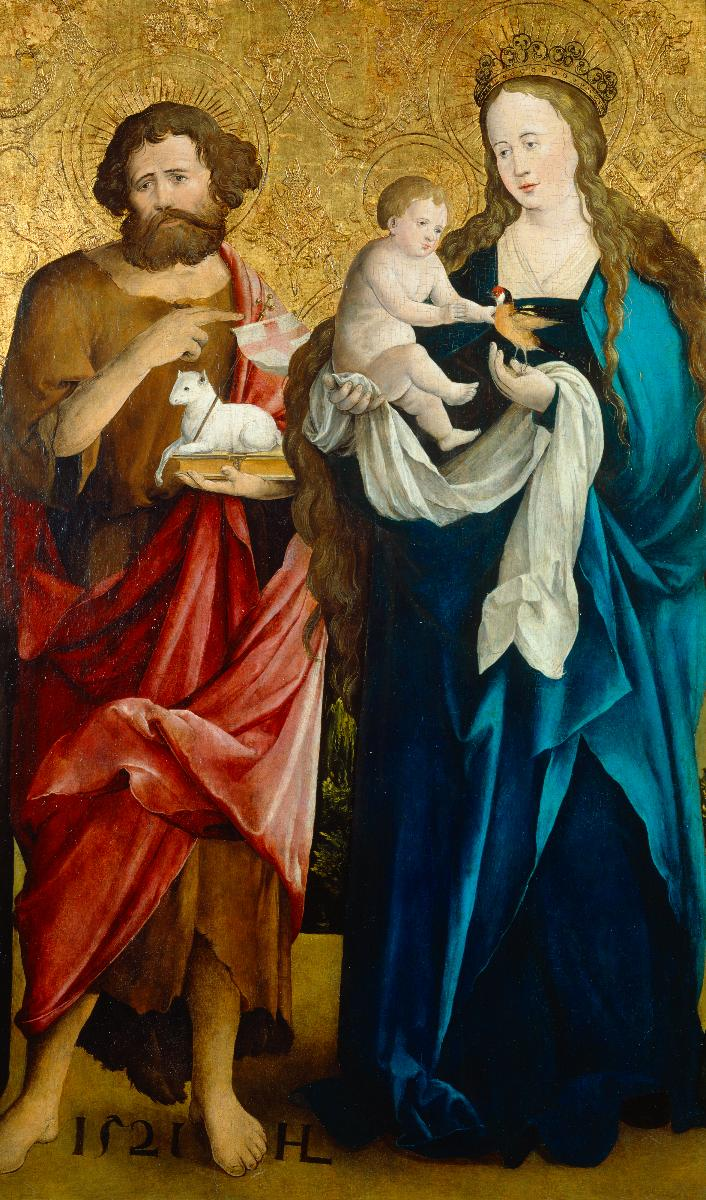
John the Baptist and Mary with the Christ Child, 1521
