= Boris Alexandrovich Engelhardt =

Russian military personnel (1877–1962)

- Борис Александрович Энгельгардт
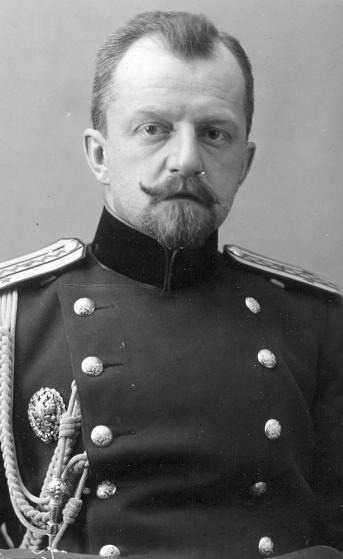
- As member of the 4th State Duma, 1913
- Born: 19 July [O.S. 7 July] 1877; Smolensk Governorate, Russian Empire
- Died: 2 September 1962 (aged 74); Riga, Latvian SSR, Soviet Union
- Relatives: Alexander Petrovich Engelhardt (father)
- Military career
- Allegiance: Russian Empire; Soviet Union
- Branch: Imperial Russian Army
- Conflicts: Russo-Japanese War

Boris Aleksandrovich Engelhardt (Russian: Бори́с Алекса́ндрович Энгельга́рдт; 19 July [O.S. 7 July] 1877 – 2 September 1962) was a Russian military and political figure, and the first revolutionary commandant of Petrograd during the February Revolution.

== Biography ==
Engelhardt was from the nobility of the Engelhardt family from Smolensk Governorate, originally from Switzerland. His father, Alexander Petrovich Engelhardt (1836–1907) was an artillery designer. He graduated from the Page Corps in 1896. He served in the Life Guards Uhlan Regiment. In 1903, he graduated from the Nicholas General Staff Academy. Engelhardt was a squadron commander of the 2nd Nerchinsk Regiment. He participated in the Russo-Japanese War. He was an assistant to the senior adjutant of the quartermaster general's office of the 1st Manchurian Army. In 1906, he completed a one-year course at the Officer Cavalry School. From January 1907 he was senior adjutant of the staff of the 8th Infantry Division. In May 1908, he retired for health reasons.

He settled in his estate Pecherskaya Buda in the Mstislavsky Uyezd of the Mogilev Governorate, where he became seriously interested in agriculture, introduced a nine-field system in his estate, and visited Denmark, where he became acquainted with the latest achievements in agricultural technology and agronomy. He founded a distillery and a cheese factory. He was elected as a deputy of the nobility of the Mogilev Governorate and a zemstvo member of the Mstislavsky Uyezd. In the autumn of 1915, he joined the Octobrists. His land ownership amounted to 1,380 dessiatines. During the elections to the 4th Duma, he remained single.

On 19 October 1912, he was elected as a deputy of the Fourth State Duma from the total number of electors of the Mogilev Provincial Electoral Assembly. Initially, he joined the Center faction. But by the autumn of 1915, at the insistence of Mikhail Rodzianko, he moved to the Zemstvo-Octobrist faction. He was a member of the Duma commission on military and naval affairs, the financial commission, the commission for the implementation of the state budget of income and expenditure, and the budget commission. He delivered reports on behalf of the commission for the implementation of the state budget of income and expenditure and the commission on military and naval affairs. In 1916, he left the country as part of a foreign parliamentary delegation. From the autumn of 1916, representing the Zemstvo-Octobrist faction, he worked within the Progressive Bloc and was a supporter of the Ministry of Trust.

From 4 April 1917, he worked in the Military Commission under the chairmanship of General Alexei Polivanov. Engelhardt was a member of the executive committee of the Council of Officers' Deputies of the city of Petrograd, its environs, the Baltic Fleet and the Separate Border Guard Corps.

In the summer of 1918, he fled from Petrograd (after the arrests that began following the murder of Uritsky). In November 1918 in Ukraine, from the autumn of 1918 he was the head of the political department of the Volunteer Army representative office in Kiev, and from December 1918 in Odessa. In the Armed Forces of South Russia from 18 March 1919. he was an assistant to the manager of the propaganda department (OSVAG) of the Special Conference under the Commander-in-Chief of the Armed Forces of South Russia. In the summer of 1919 at the headquarters of the troops of the Southwestern Territory (Odessa), from December 1919 he was the head of the same propaganda department. Engelhardt evacuated from Novorossiysk.

Engelhardt lived in exile in France where he worked as a taxi driver, then in Latvia as a trainer at the Riga Hippodrome.

After the Baltic republics were annexed by the Soviet Union, Engelhardt was arrested and served administrative exile in the Khorazm Region from 1940 to 1946. Engelhardt worked as an artist in Khiva, then as a trainer at the State Horse Breeding Center in Urgench and at the Tashkent Hippodrome, and worked as an agronomist in Tashkent. During World War II, he asked to be sent to the front to serve in the active army. In 1945, he received Soviet citizenship. In 1946, he was allowed to return to Riga, where he worked as a translator from French, English, and German at the Hydrometeorological Service. Later, he served as a secretary of the panel of judges at the Riga Hippodrome. He is mentioned in the novel I Have the Honor by V. Pikul as an exposed agent of the German Abwehr.

Engelhardt is the author of the memoirs, The Drowned World.

== Essays ==
- Революционные дни: (Воспоминания участника февральских дней 1917 года) // Общее дело. [Париж], 1921. 16, 17, 18 марта;
- Революционные дни: Письмо в редакцию // Общее дело. [Париж], 1921. 27 апреля;
- Двадцать лет тому назад... Почему антиреволюционная Государственная дума возглавила революционное движение в 1917 году: (Из воспоминаний бывш. члена Государственной Думы) // Сегодня. [Рига], 1937. 9 и 10 апреля;
- Первые сумбурные дни революции 1917 год: (Из воспоминания б. члена Государственной думы) // Сегодня. [Рига], 1937. 28 апреля;
- Тридцать лет тому назад // Новое русское слово. [Нью-Йорк], 1947. No. 12733, 12740;
- Потонувший мир // Военно-исторический журнал. 1964. No. 1, 5, 8–10;
- Крушение империи: Бывший депутат Государственной думы рассказывает о падении царизма // Неделя. 1964. 13-19 декабря.
- Воспоминания: 1940-1941 годы / Предисловие и публикация А. Д. Мальцева // Источниковедческое изучение памятников письменной культуры. Л., 1990;
- Воспоминания камер-пажа / Публ. В.А. Авдеева // Военно-исторический журнал. 1993. No. 12; 1994 No. 1-7, 9, 12; 2002. No. 12; 2004. No. 3, 4;
- Февральская революция / Подготовка текста, вступительная статья и примечания А. Б. Николаева // Клио: Журнал для ученых. СПб., 2003

== Awards ==
- Order of St. Anne, 4th class (26 September 1904)
- St. George's weapon (VP 30 January 1915)
- Order of St. Anne 3rd Class with swords and bow (27 September 1915)
- Order of St. Anne, 2nd Class with swords (24 May 1916)

== Sources ==
- Шабанов В. М. Военный орден Святого Великомученика и Победоносца Георгия. Именные списки 1769—1920. (Биобиблиографический справочник). — М.: Русскiй мiръ, 2004. — С. 851. — 3000 экз. — ISBN 5-89577-059-2.
- "Boris Alexandrovich Engelhardt" (in Russian). «Russian army in a Great war» project.
- Волков С. В. Участники Белого движения в России (буква «Э»). База данных No. 2 (рус.). На сайте историка С. В. Волкова С. 20.
- Боиович М. М. Члены Государственной думы (Портреты и биографии. Четвёртый созыв. М., 1913. c. 179.
- Четвертая Государственная дума. Портреты и биографии. — Санкт-Петербург: издание Н. Н. Ольшанскаго, 1913. С. 27.
- 4-й созыв Государственной думы: Художественный фототипический альбом с портретами и биографиями. СПб., 1913. Табл. 4.
- А. Б. Николаев. Энгельгардт Борис Александрович // Государственная дума Российской империи: 1906—1917. Б. Ю. Иванов, А. А. Комзолова, И. С. Ряховская. Москва. РОССПЭН. 2008. С. 715-716.
- Мальцев А. Д. Б. А. Энгельгардт в 1917 году // Герценовские чтения 2000: Актуальные проблемы социальных наук СПб., 2000.
- Российский государственный исторический архив. Фонд 1278. Опись 8. Дело 9. Часть 1; Фонд 1278. Опись 9. Дело 917;
- Отдел рукописей РНБ (Российская национальная библиотека). Фонд 1052.
