= Englebert =

Englebert may refer to any of the following:

== Given name ==
- Englebert Fisen (1655–1733), Flemish painter
- Englebert Mollin (1904–1945), Belgian wrestler
- Englebert Opdebeeck (born 1946), Belgian cyclist

== Surname ==
- Gaëtan Englebert (born 1976), Belgian football midfielder
- René Englebert (fl. 1908), Belgian sport shooter

== Other uses ==
- Englebert (tyre manufacturer), Belgian tyre manufacturing company
- Englebert Complex, a sports facility owned by the City of Dunedin, Florida, U.S.
- TP Mazembe, formerly known as Englebert, a Congolese football club

== See also ==
- Engelbert (disambiguation)
