= Pavel Bashutsky =

Pavel Yakovlevich Bashutsky
- Russian: Па́вел Я́ковлевич Башу́цкий
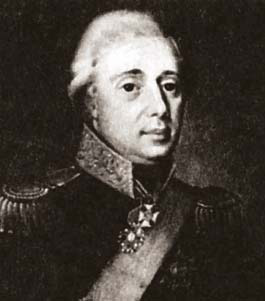
- Born: 28 August 1771
- Died: 23 January 1836 (aged 64); St. Petersburg
- Military career
- Allegiance: Russian Empire
- Branch: Imperial Russian Army
- Service years: 1786–1832
- Rank: General of the infantry
- Conflicts: Russo-Swedish War (1788–1790); Battle of Vyborg Bay; War of the Fourth Coalition; Battle of Heilsberg; Battle of Friedland; War of the Fifth Coalition; Siege of Modlin; Siege of Danzig; Patriotic War of 1812; Decembrist revolt
- Awards: Order of St. Anna (1st class); Order of St. Alexander of Neva; Order of St. Vladimir (1st class); Order of St. John of Jerusalem; Order of St. George (3rd class); Medal for XLV Years of Distinguished Service

Pavel Yakovlevich Bashutsky (Russian: Па́вел Я́ковлевич Башу́цкий; 28 August 1771 – 23 January 1836) was a General of the Infantry of the Russian Empire. He served during several stages of the Napoleonic Wars, including the War of the Fourth Coalition, the War of the Fifth Coalition, as well as the Patriotic War of 1812. He also functioned as the commandant of the capital St. Petersburg for numerous years. After ending his active military service, he served in the Ministry of War.

== Military career ==
Bashutsky was a member of the Polish Bashutsky family, whose members had moved to Russia in 1709. He entered military service on 24 June 1786, when he enlisted in the 3rd Marine Battalion.

Two years later, he took part in the Russo-Swedish War of 1788–1790, and served at the battles of Seskar and Vyborg. In June 1796, Bashutsky moved to the Gatchina troops (as a lieutenant), while on 20 November of the same year he was transferred to the Life Guard Izmailovsk Regiment. In the ensuing years, Bashutsky would steadily rise through the ranks. On 9 September 1799, he became colonel (polkovnik), and four years later, on 8 September 1803, he was promoted to major general. Later that year, in December, he was appointed commander of St. Petersburg.

In 1807, during the Napoleonic Wars, Bashutsky led an army composed of the Life Guard Semyonovsk and Izmailovsk regiments at the battles of Heilsberg and Friedland. For his efforts in these battles, he earned the Order of St. George (3rd class) on 2 June 1808.

Several months prior to receiving the award, in February 1808, he was appointed commander of the entire Life Guard Izmailovsk regiment. He remained its commander for about three years. On 10 November 1811, he was given command of the 25th division. Amidst Napoleon's invasion, Bashutsky oversaw the recruiting and training of the reserve battalions. In 1813, he was given command of the 1st Reserve Infantry Corps, and with it took part in the sieges of Modlin and Danzig. However, in March of the next year, in 1814, General Ivan Veliaminov replaced Bashutsky, and he therefore returned to his previous post as commander of the capital St. Petersburg. On 11 September 1816, Bashutsky was promoted to lieutenant general. About a decade later, in December 1825, he took part in the general suppression of the Decembrist revolt.

On 7 July 1828, he was promoted to the rank of General of the Infantry. Bashutsky then served for a few more years, until 1832, after which he served in the Imperial Russian Ministry of War. He was dismissed from his post as commandant of St. Petersburg on 6 December 1833.

== Sources ==
- Mikaberidze, Alexander (2005). Russian Officer Corps of the Revolutionary and Napoleonic Wars. Savas Beatie. ISBN 978-1611210026.
- Polovtsov, Alexander Alexandrovich, ed. (1900). "Павел Яковлевич Башуцкий". Russian Biographical Dictionary (in Russian). pp. 622–623.
