= Claude Ursule Gency =

French general

Claude-Ursule Gency (13 June 1765, Meulan – 6 January 1845) was a French general of the French Revolutionary Wars and Napoleonic Wars.
