= Vladimir Engelgardt =

Soviet biochemist and pioneer of molecular biology

Vladimir Aleksandrovich Engelgardt (Russian: Владимир Александрович Энгельгардт; 3 December 1894 – 10 July 1984) was a Soviet biochemist, academician of the Soviet Academy of Medical Sciences (1944), academician of the Soviet Academy of Sciences (1953), and Hero of Socialist Labor (1969). He was the founder and the first director of the Institute of Molecular Biology of the Russian Academy of Sciences (later renamed the Engelhardt Institute of Molecular Biology in his honor).

Vladimir Engelgardt is considered to be one of the founders of molecular biology in the Soviet Union.

== Honours and awards ==
- Stalin Prize for the study of muscle tissue (1943)
- USSR State Prize (1979)
- Hero of Socialist Labour (1969)
- Five Orders of Lenin
- Order of the Patriotic War, 2nd class
- Order of the Red Banner of Labour
- Lomonosov Gold Medal (1968)
