= Compañía Sevillana de Electricidad =

Sevillana de Electricidad (CSE)
- Type: Joint stock company
- Industry: Electricity generation
- Founded: 23 July 1894
- Defunct: 1996–2002
- Fate: Merged into Endesa
- Successor: Sevillana-Endesa
- Headquarters: Seville, Spain
- Area served: Andalusia and Extremadura
- Key people: Director General Francisco Arteaga (2009)
- Revenue: 287,470 million pesetas (1995)
- Number of employees: > 1000
- Parent: Grupo Endesa
- Website: http://www.sevillanelec.es/

The Compañía Sevillana de Electricidad, S. A. (known as CSE, Sevillana, or Sevillana de Electricidad) was a Spanish electricity generation company, founded in Seville in 1894. In the course of the 20th century it absorbed various other companies and came to be practically the sole generator of power in Andalusia. Beginning in 1996, it underwent the first of several stages in the process of being merged into the multinational corporation Endesa, becoming known as Sevillana-Endesa. That process was completed in 2002.

== History ==
=== Foundation ===
Spain first began to regulate the generation of electricity toward the end of the 19th century. On 23 July 1894 the Compañía Sevillana de Electricidad, Sociedad Anónima was founded, with capital coming from the then-new German electrical generation equipment company Allgemeine Elektrizitäts-Gesellschaft (AEG) and from Deutsche Bank. At that time its operations were limited to the province of Seville. In 1914 the company became the sole generator of power in that province, with a capacity of 15 GW.

=== Expansion ===
At that point, CSE began to grow into neighboring provinces, beginning with the Campo de Gibraltar in the province of Cádiz. In 1926, CSE acquired the Empresa Rondeña de Electricidad (based in Ronda), giving CSE the dominant position in generating electricity in the province of Málaga, including hydroelectric generation on the river Guadalevín, in the Tajo de Ronda. In 1936 it was the leading electrical generation company in Andalusia, with a capacity of 130 GW.

After the interruption of the Spanish Civil War, the company remained in Spanish hands, and a decade later began its most rapid period of expansion, beginning with a merger with Mengemor in 1951. In 1964 CSE absorbed the Sociedad Hidroeléctrica de Peñarroya, and in 1967 Hidroeléctrica del Chorro, its principal competitor in the Andalusian market and owner of the hydroelectric works at El Chorro on the river Guadalhorce in the province of Málaga. The process of expansion culminated in 1968 with the acquisition of the Centrales Térmicas del Litoral, coastal thermal power stations built by the state-owned Instituto Nacional de Industria (INI). This gave CSE a monopoly of electrical generation in Andalusia and in the Extremaduran province of Badajoz.

When the 1973 oil crisis threatened the supply of cheap fuel oil, CSE entered into the field of nuclear power generation. Together with other companies it participated in the creation of the Almaraz Nuclear Power Plant (started in 1973) and the Valdecaballeros Nuclear Power Plant (started in 1975). The Almaraz plant began generating power in 1981. The Valdecaballeros plant never went online.

The increasingly important CSE became one of the stocks on the IBEX 35 index of Spanish stocks.

=== Endesa ===
Deregulation of the Spanish market for electricity as part of entry into the European Union, brought in Endesa as an investor, purchasing 33.5 percent of the company in 1991. In 1996 Grupo Endesa owned 75 percent of the company's shares, giving them absolute control of CSE.

In 1999, CSE stock ceased to trade on the exchange, and on 15 February 2002 the company ceased to exist as a separate corporation, integrated into Grupo Endesa, Spain's largest generator of electricity, as Sevillana-Endesa.
