= Konrad Engelhard =

Zurich councillor and military captain

Personal details
- Died: after March 1525 Kyburg
- Spouse: Anna Ammann
- Parent: Johan Engelhard
- Relatives: Heinrich Engelhard (brother)
- Occupation: Councillor, military captain, bailiff

Konrad Engelhard (first mentioned 1503 – died after March 1525 in Kyburg) was a Zürich councillor, military captain, and bailiff who played a significant role in the Italian Wars of the early 16th century.

== Biography ==
=== Early life and family ===
Konrad Engelhard was the son of Johan Engelhard, a Zurich councillor who served from 1478 to 1498. He was the brother of Heinrich Engelhard. He married Anna Ammann, daughter of Ludwig Ammann, the city secretary.

=== Political career ===
Engelhard first appeared in the historical record in 1503, when he became one of the Twelve of the Zunft zur Meisen in the Grand Council. From 1505 to 1507, he served in the Small Council as Zunftmeister of his guild. He later served as bailiff of Greifensee from 1507 to 1509, and subsequently as bailiff of Kyburg from 1514 to 1525. From 1514 to 1516, he was a member of the Small Council, serving as one of the six "freely elected" members.

=== Military service ===
In 1507, Engelhard served as a captain in French service. From 1511 to 1515, he commanded Zurich troops during the Italian Wars. He contributed to the victory over French forces at the Battle of Novara in 1513 and distinguished himself at the Battle of Marignano in 1515.

Engelhard died after March 1525 in Kyburg.

== Bibliography ==
- Stucki, Heinzpeter (2005). "Engelhard, Konrad". In Historical Dictionary of Switzerland. Translated by André Naon.
