= Engelhardt Institute of Molecular Biology =

Soviet-Russian research institute

- Институт молекулярной биологии имени В. А. Энгельгардта РАН
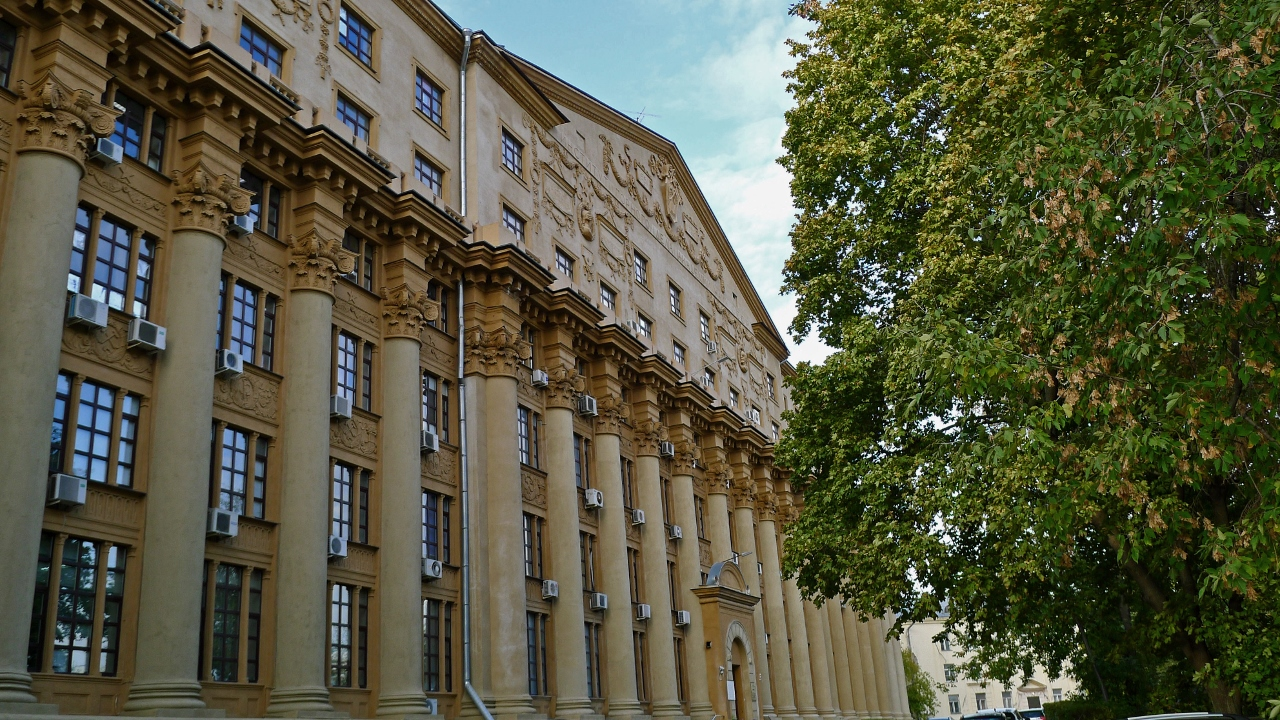
- Type: Public
- Established: April 26, 1957
- Location: 32 Vavilova str., Moscow, Russia; 55°41′55″N 37°34′20″E
- Website: eimb.ru

The Engelhardt Institute of Molecular Biology (EIMB) (Russian: Институт молекулярной биологии имени В. А. Энгельгардта РАН) is a research institute located in Moscow, Russia. The Institute is included in the Branch of Biological Sciences of the Russian Academy of Sciences and has the status of a State non-commercial organization.

== History ==
The institute was founded on April 26, 1957 by Vladimir Engelgardt who became its first director. Until 1965 it was known as the Institute of Radiation and Physicochemical Biology of the Russian Academy of Sciences. On May 12, 1988 the institute was named after Vladimir Engelhardt.

Directors:

- 1957–1984 — V. A. Engelhardt;
- 1984–2003 — A. D. Mirzabekov;
- 2003– — Alexander Alexandrovich Makarov.

== Scientific activities ==
- Biopolymer structure and molecular dynamics
- Genomic and proteomic bioinformatics
- Genetic enzymology
- Mobile and repeating genetic elements and their evolution
- Molecular and cell engineering; bioengineering
- Molecular immunology
- Oncogenomics, oncodiagnostics, oncoprognosis, oncovirology
- Plant genomics
- Signal transfer at molecular and cellular level
- The development of fundamental principles of new molecular and cellular technologies and bionanotechnologies.
- The design of new biologically active compounds
