= 4217 Engelhardt =

Asteroid

Discovery
- Discovered by: C. Shoemaker
- Discovery site: Palomar Obs.
- Discovery date: 24 January 1988

Designations
- Named after: Wolf von Engelhardt (German mineralogist)
- Alternative designations: 1988 BO_{2} · 1944 RL; 1951 RY_{1} · 1970 AA
- Minor planet category: main-belt · Phocaea

Orbital characteristics
- Epoch 4 September 2017 (JD 2458000.5)
- Uncertainty parameter 0
- Observation arc: 72.73 yr (26,563 days)
- Aphelion: 2.8045 AU
- Perihelion: 1.8246 AU
- Semi-major axis: 2.3145 AU
- Eccentricity: 0.2117
- Orbital period (sidereal): 3.52 yr (1,286 days)
- Mean anomaly: 272.23°
- Mean motion: 0° 16^{m} 47.64^{s} / day
- Inclination: 23.129°
- Longitude of ascending node: 355.44°
- Argument of perihelion: 348.79°
- Known satellites: 1 (P: 36.03 h) (Note: Lightcurve plot of (4217) Engelhardt, at the Palmer Divide Observatory, by B. D. Warner (2011). The first plot gives a rotation period of 3.0661 hours. The second plot has that period subtracted and gives a possible orbital period of 36.03 hours for the presumed satellite.)

Physical characteristics
- Dimensions: 7.34±1.36 km 8.742±0.356 km 9.16±1.0 km 9.24 km (derived)
- Synodic rotation period: 3.066±0.001 h 3.0661±0.0002 h
- Geometric albedo: 0.2108±0.052; 0.231±0.046; 0.2489 (derived); 0.37±0.17
- Spectral type: S
- Absolute magnitude (H): 12.10±0.67 · 12.20 · 12.3 · 12.50

4217 Engelhardt, provisional designation 1988 BO_{2}, is a stony Phocean asteroid and a potentially binary system from the inner regions of the asteroid belt, approximately 9 kilometers in diameter. It was discovered on 24 January 1988, by American astronomer Carolyn Shoemaker at Palomar Observatory in California, and later named after German mineralogist Wolf von Engelhardt.

== Classification and orbit ==
Engelhardt is a stony S-type asteroid and a member of the Phocaea family (701). It orbits the Sun in the inner main-belt at a distance of 1.8–2.8 AU once every 3 years and 6 months (1,286 days). Its orbit has an eccentricity of 0.21 and an inclination of 23° with respect to the ecliptic.

It was first identified as 1944 RL at Turku Observatory in 1944, extending the body's observation arc by 44 years prior to its official discovery observation at Palomar. It will pass about 0.0017 AU (250,000 km) from Earth threatening asteroid (29075) 1950 DA in 2736.

== Physical characteristics ==
=== Lightcurves ===
In November 2004, a rotational lightcurve of Engelhardt was obtained from photometric observations by American astronomer Brian Warner at this Palmer Divide Observatory in Colorado. Lightcurve analysis gave a well-defined rotation period of 3.066 hours with a brightness amplitude of 0.16 magnitude (U=3).

In December 2011, a follow-up observation by Warner gave a period of 3.0661 hours with 0.18 amplitude (U=3). Due to a couple of supposed occultation and eclipsing events, Warner also suspects that Engelhardt might by a binary system with a minor-planet moon orbiting it every 36.03 hours. The result, however, is far from conclusive.

=== Diameter and albedo ===
According to the surveys carried out by the Infrared Astronomical Satellite IRAS, the Japanese Akari satellite, and NASA's Wide-field Infrared Survey Explorer with its subsequent NEOWISE mission, Engelhardt measures between 7.34 and 9.16 kilometers in diameter and its surface has an albedo between and 0.231 and 0.37. The Collaborative Asteroid Lightcurve Link derives an albedo of 0.2489 and a diameter of 9.24 kilometers with on an absolute magnitude of 12.3.

== Naming ==
Baltic German geologist and mineralogist Wolf von Engelhardt (1910–2008), expert on impact craters and related mineral metamorphism. He was a professor at the University of Tübingen and a longtime director of its Institute of Mineralogy and Petrography. The approved naming citation was published by the Minor Planet Center on 27 June 1991 (M.P.C. 18456).
