= Valerian Engelhardt =

Russian lieutenant general (1798–1856)

Valerian Johann von Engelhardt (Russian: Валериа́н Фёдорович Энгельга́рдт; 1798–1856) was a Russian lieutenant general and director of the Russian Institute of Railway Engineers.

== Family ==
Engelhardt was born into the nobility of Livonia as a member of the Engelhardt family on December 24, 1798, the son of Colonel F. H. Engelhardt.

His brother Nikolai Engelhardt also became a lieutenant general and member of the Order of St. George.

== Army career ==
In 1815, he entered military service as a cadet in the Life Guards Regiment of Chasseurs. He was promoted to ensign in 1819.

In 1830, Engelhardt was assigned to the Tenginsky 77th Infantry Regiment, and soon distinguished himself in the campaign in the Kuban, for which he was promoted to captain. In 1832 he was promoted to colonel and transferred to the Volinsky Life Guards Regiment.

In 1831 Engelhardt was promoted to major general and appointed to the 3rd Grenadier Division. In 1842 he was made a commander for special assignments in the independent Caucasian Corps under General Neidgardt.

== Director of the Institute of Railway Engineers ==
In 1843, Engelhardt was appointed director of the Institute of Railway Engineers. On December 4 of the same year, he was awarded the Order of St. George, fourth class, for his 25 years of irreproachable service as an officer. In 1852 he received the rank of lieutenant general and was appointed to a senior post in the Corps of Civil Engineers.

Engelhardt died on May 20, 1856, in St. Petersburg and is buried in the Volkov Lutheran cemetery.

== Sources ==
- "Collected Reports of the Caucasian Archive Commission". 1866–1904. (in Russian)
- Volkov, S. V. (2009). Generals of the Russian Empire: Encyclopedic Dictionary of Generals and Admirals from Peter I to Nicholas II. Vol. II. (in Russian)
- Stepanov, V. S.; Grigorovich, P.I. (1869). In Memory of the Centenary of the Imperial Military Order of St. George the Great Martyr and Conqueror. (in Russian)
