= Christoph von Engelhardt =

Baltic German general (1762–1831)

Christoph Friedrich von Engelhardt (Russian: Фёдор-Христофор Антонович Энгельгардт, tr. Fyodor-Khristofor Antonovich Engel’gardt) (March 18, 1762, in Riga, Russian Empire – June 29, 1831, in Riga) was a Baltic German general and a hero of the storming of Izmail during the Russo-Turkish War of 1787–1792.

== Early career ==
Engelhardt was born a member of the noble family Engelhardt. He entered the army in the Life Guards Regiment of the Transfiguration on June 25, 1781 (or on March 3, 1781, according to some sources). He was appointed on January 2 of the following year an adjutant in the headquarters of Prince Grigory Potemkin. Engelhardt, who was also carried on the roll of the Novotroitskoye Cuirassier Regiment, was often used as a courier of messages between ministers of the Russian Cabinet and their counterparts in Germany and England.

In April 1784, Engelhardt was made Potemkin's adjutant general, and on June 26 of that year was transferred to the Smolensk Dragoon Regiment.

== Second Turkish War ==
For outstanding bravery rendered during the storming of the fortress of Izmail, with the extermination of the Turkish army at that place.

— Citation honoring Engelhardt for service in the war

Engelhardt was sent in January 1787 to serve on the Caucasus front under Lieutenant General Pavel Potemkin, and they fought the Chechens at the Terek River during the Russian conquest of the Caucasus, then took part in the Russo-Turkish War of 1787–1792. He was at the conquest of the cities of Bender and Kiliya, in a battle with a Turkish fleet on the Danube, and in the storming and capture of Izmail. On March 25, 1791, he was promoted to colonel and awarded the Order of St. George, fourth degree.

== Polish uprising ==
Engelhardt fought in Lithuania during the 1792 Polish campaign. Commanding a detached corps during the Kościuszko Uprising, he destroyed the Polish insurgents at Białystok in May 1794. In October he took part in the Battle of Maciejowice which resulted in the capture of Kościuszko and all his staff, and for which he was awarded the Golden Sword with the inscription "For Bravery" on October 26. In November came the storming of the Warsaw suburb of Praga and the fall of Warsaw. For protection of a bridge during this battle, Engelhardt was awarded the Order of St. Vladimir, third degree.

== Napoleonic wars ==
January 20, 1795, by decision of the State Military Board, Engelhardt was dismissed from the service for ill health with the rank of brigadier.

During the 1806 War of the Fourth Coalition against Napoleon, Engelhardt was commander of the Livonia Zemstvo police guarding the border with East Prussia. During the 1812 campaign, Engelhardt led a force of volunteers and participated in the defense of Riga against the French under Marshal Macdonald; in recognition of his service, he was awarded the Order of St. Anne, second degree with diamonds.

Engelhardt died of cholera in Riga on June 29, 1831.

== Other sources ==
- Volkov, S. V. (2009). Generals of the Russian Empire: Encyclopedic Dictionary of Generals and Admirals from Peter I to Nicholas II. Vol. II. (in Russian)
- Stepanov, V. S.; Grigorovich, P.I. (1869). In Memory of the Centenary of the Imperial Military Order of St. George the Great Martyr and Conqueror. St. Petersburg. (in Russian)
