= Nikolai Engelhardt =

Russian lieutenant general (1799–1856)

Nikolai Fyodorovich Engelhardt (Russian: Никола́й Фёдорович Энгельга́рдт) (24 December 1799 – 27 February 1856) was a Russian lieutenant general who helped to suppress the Hungarian Revolution of 1848.

== Family ==
Engelhardt was born into the nobility of Livonia as a member of the Engelhardt family on 24 December 1798. He was the son of Colonel F. A. Engelhardt, adjutant of Prince Grigory Potemkin.

His brother Valerian Engelhardt also became a lieutenant general and fought with honors in the Caucasus and was director of the Institute of the Corps of Railways. Another brother, Alexander-Reingold, with the rank of staff captain, was killed in 1828 during the Siege of Varna.

== Army career ==
=== Early life ===
He entered military service in 1816 as a junker in the Life Guards Jäger Regiment and on 1 January 1822 was promoted to ensign. In the ranks of his regiment in 1831 he took part in suppressing the Polish uprising of 1831. For his performance, he was promoted to staff captain and on 15 February 1832 he was awarded a golden half-saber with the inscription “For Bravery”.

On 2 June 1836 with the rank of captain, he was transferred to the Ukrainian Jaeger Regiment and promoted to lieutenant colonel. In 1839 he received the rank of colonel and from 1839 he commanded the Yelets infantry regiment. On 4 December 1843, for his irreproachable service of 25 years in the officer ranks, he was awarded the Order of St. George of the 4th degree. Promoted to major general on 6 December 1846, Engelhardt commanded the 1st Brigade of the 15th Infantry Division from 1848.

=== In Hungary ===
At the end of 1848, General Anton Freiherr von Puchner, who commanded the Austrian troops in Transylvania, had no hope of getting support from Vienna against the rebellious Hungarians and turned for help to the commander of the Russian corps that occupied the Danube principalities, General Alexander von Lüders. With the permission of Tsar Nicholas I, on 31 January 1849, two Russian detachments under command of Major General Engelhardt and Colonel Skariatin entered Transylvania and took over the defense of Brașov and Sibiu from the Imperial troops. On 4 February, between Szászhermány and Szentpéter, they defeated rebel forces under Sándor Gál. But due to Józef Bem's victories over the Austrian Army, he was forced to evacuate Brasov on 19 March. In mid-July, he crushed a Hungarian detachment in Făgăraș. He distinguished himself in the Battle of Segesvár, where he led General Lüders' defensive forces.

On 28 November 1849 Engelhardt was awarded the Order of St. George 3rd degree:

In exchange for the excellent courage and exemplary bravery shown in the battle against the rebellious Hungarians, on July 15 at Hermannstadt (Sibiu) and July 31 at Mühlenbach (Segesvár), where, commanding the vanguard, with his courageous and decisive attacks he contributed to the complete victory over the enemy.

=== Later career ===
On 12 January 1854 he was appointed commander of the 15th Infantry Division. On 25 March 1854, for crossing of the Danube during the Russo-Turkish War, 1853-1856, he was promoted to lieutenant general. On 10 November 1854, for distinguishing himself during the Siege of Silistra, he was awarded a golden sword with the inscription "For Bravery" and with diamond jewelry.

After the Anglo-French forces landed in the Crimea, he was left in Ukraine as the commander of a detachment to guard the Black Sea coast. He died on 27 February 1856 in Odessa.
