= Alexander Engelhardt (general) =

Russian Army general (1798–1859)

Alexander Bogdanovich Engelhardt (Russian: Алекса́ндр Богда́нович Энгельга́рдт; 1795–1859) was a Russian baron, lieutenant general, and chief of Russian southern military settlements.

Engelhardt was born a member of the noble and baronial Engelhardt family, and part of the nobility of Courland Governorate (present-day Latvia).

== Military career ==
On May 27, 1813, he was appointed a cadet in the Life Guards Dragoon Regiment, and immediately took part in the War of the Sixth Coalition against Napoleon. He was awarded the Kulmsky Cross, an award essentially identical to the Iron Cross, which was given by the Prussians to all participants in the 1813 Battle of Kulm. He was promoted ensign in 1814.

Two years later, at his own request, he was transferred with the rank of lieutenant to the Mitavsky Dragoon Regiment, in which he served until March 17, 1820, when he retired due to illness. He returned to the service on June 7, 1821, with the Starodub Cuirassier Regiment.

Promoted in 1828 to the rank of major, he was made commander of the Starodubskii Regiment, a military settlement. He commanded this settlement for about five years, being promoted to lieutenant colonel on June 18, 1830.

On March 31, 1833, Engelhardt was transferred to the cavalry, and in May 1834 was appointed commander of the Ordenskim Currasier Regiment (13th Dragoons Military Order of Field Marshal Count Minich Regiment).

On December 3, 1842, Englehardt was awarded the Order of St. George, fourth degree, in recognition of his 25 years of irreproachable service as an officer.

On June 25, 1845, Englehard was promoted to Major General, and on February 6, 1847, was appointed commander of the 2nd Brigade of the 1st Currasier Division.

== Commander of military settlements ==
On September 37, 1846, he was appointed commander of the First, Second, Third, and Fourth Cavalry Districts in the military settlement system. From that time until his he death he served in the administration of military settlements. In April 1850 he was appointed commander of eight districts, on March 30, 1855, he was promoted to lieutenant general, and on January 15, 1856, he was made overall commander of all the southern military settlements.

Engelhardt died in early 1859. His brother Basil was also a lieutenant general and commander of the Life Guards Dragoon Regiment and later governor of Kovno.

== Sources ==
- Volkov, S. V. (2009). Generals of the Russian Empire: Encyclopedic Dictionary of Generals and Admirals from Peter I to Nicholas II. Vol. II. (in Russian)
- Stepanov, V. S.; Grigorovich, P.I. (1869). In Memory of the Centenary of the Imperial Military Order of St. George the Great Martyr and Conqueror. (in Russian)
