= Engleheart =

Engleheart is a surname. Notable people with the surname include:

- Francis Engleheart (1775–1849), engraver
- George Engleheart (1752–1829), English miniature painter
- Henry William Engleheart (1863–1939), English recipient of the Victoria Cross
- John Cox Dillman Engleheart (1784–1862), miniature painter

== See also ==
- Englehart (disambiguation)
