= Grigori Engelhardt =

Russian general (1759–1833)

Grigory Engelhardt
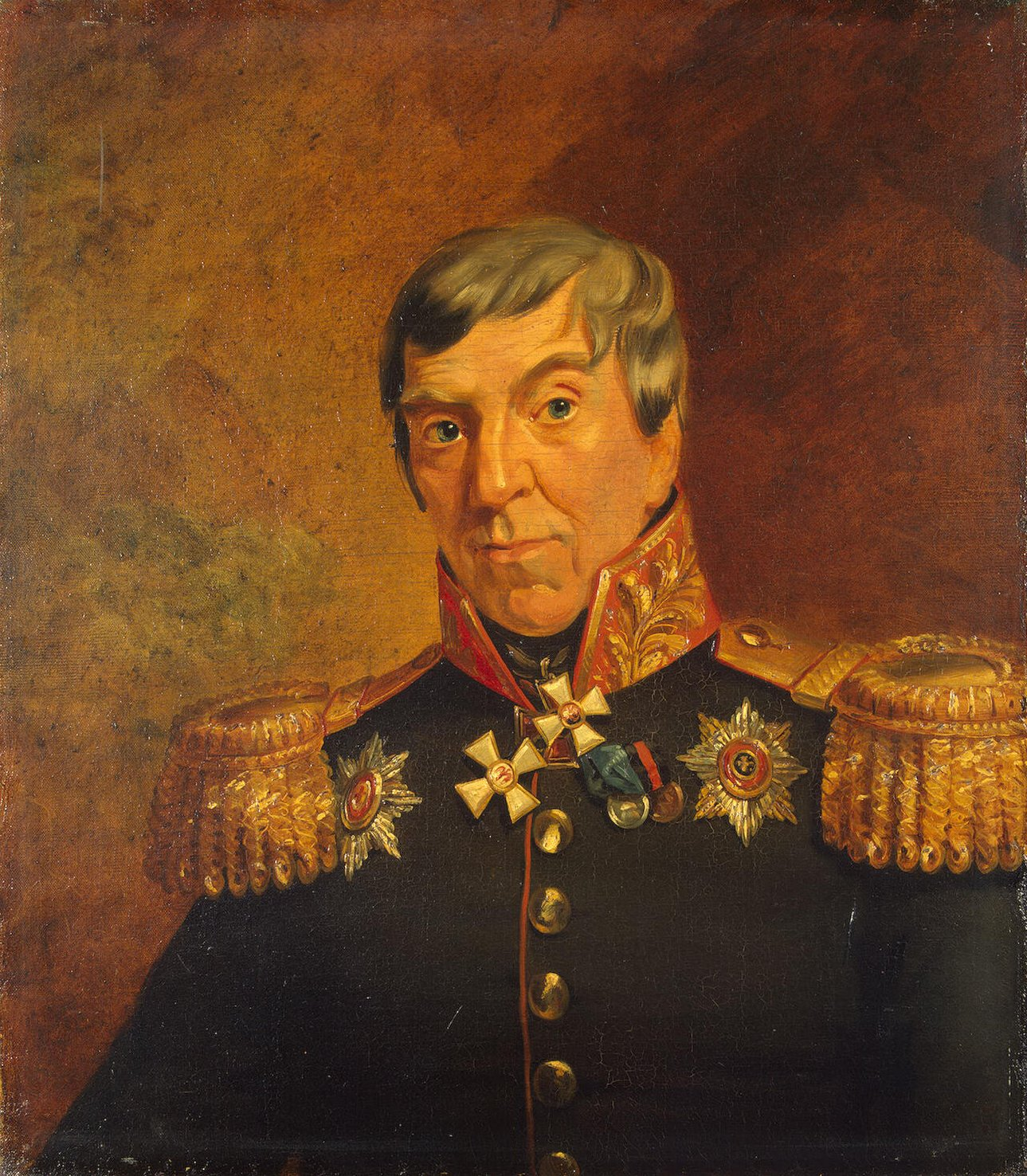
- Portrait by George Dawe, 1820–1825
- Born: 1759
- Died: 1834 (aged 74–75)
- Military career
- Allegiance: Russia
- Branch: Infantry
- Service years: 1776–1816
- Rank: Major general
- Conflicts: Napoleonic Wars; Battle of Austerlitz; Battle of Eylau; Battle of Friedland; Battle of Lützen; Battle of Bautzen
- Awards: Order of St. George (3rd class); Order of St. Anna (1st class); Order of St. Vladimir (2nd class); Cross of Eylau; Order of the Red Eagle; Golden Weapon for Bravery

Grigori or Grigory Grigoryevich Engelhardt (Russian: Григорий Григорьевич Энгельгардт; 1759–1834) was a Russian general during the Napoleonic Wars.

== Early career ==
Engelhardt was born into the nobility of Courland. On May 6, 1776, he was enrolled in the Izmailovsky Life Guards Regiment as a non-commissioned officer. On December 3, 1779, he transferred to the Nevsky Musketeer Regiment as a lieutenant.

Engelhardt fought in the Russo-Swedish War of 1788–1790 as a captain in the Ryazan Musketeer Regiment. He was wounded in the chest and right thigh at Fredrikshamn, and for his distinguished service was promoted to major. He was made a colonel on October 26, 1798, and a major general on February 5, 1800. On March 15, he was given the command of the Old Ingermanland Musketeer Regiment.

== Campaigns against the French and Turks ==
Engelhardt participatated in the Austrian campaign and was wounded by shrapnel at Austerlitz. In the 1808–1807 campaign in Prussia and Poland, he was wounded by a bullet in his right leg at Eylau, and at Friedland was badly wounded by shrapnel in his left thigh, left side, and left arm. He was awarded the Order of St. George, third and fourth class, for his distinguished service.

In 1808, he was transferred to the region of Moldavia and Wallachia, where he fought the Turks in the Russo-Turkish War, from 1809 to 1811.

== Later career ==
In the 1812 campaign, he commanded the 2nd Brigade of the 8th Infantry Division and fought against the Austrians and Poles in Volhynia and in the pursuit of the retreating enemy from Lutsk to Volkovysk. He then fought the French at Gornostaevichi, Volkovysk, and Kamenets-Zhuravsky.

During the War of the Sixth Coalition, in 1813, he participated in the capture of Białystok and Warsaw, and fought at Lutzen and Bautzen, where a severe bullet wound in the left thigh caused heavy bleeding which forced him out of the action.

During the Hundred Days, in 1815, Engelhardt participated in the second campaign in France as commander of a brigade in the 8th Infantry Division, and then briefly commanded the 3rd Brigade of the 23rd Infantry Division. Due to his wounds, he retired from the service on February 28, 1816.

== Honours and awards ==
- Order of St. Anna, 1st class with diamonds
- Order of St. George, 3rd class
- Order of St. Vladimir, 2nd class
- Cross of Eylau
- Order of the Red Eagle (Prussia)
- Gold Sword for Bravery with diamonds
