= Ériphyle (tragedy) =

Tragedy in five acts by Voltaire

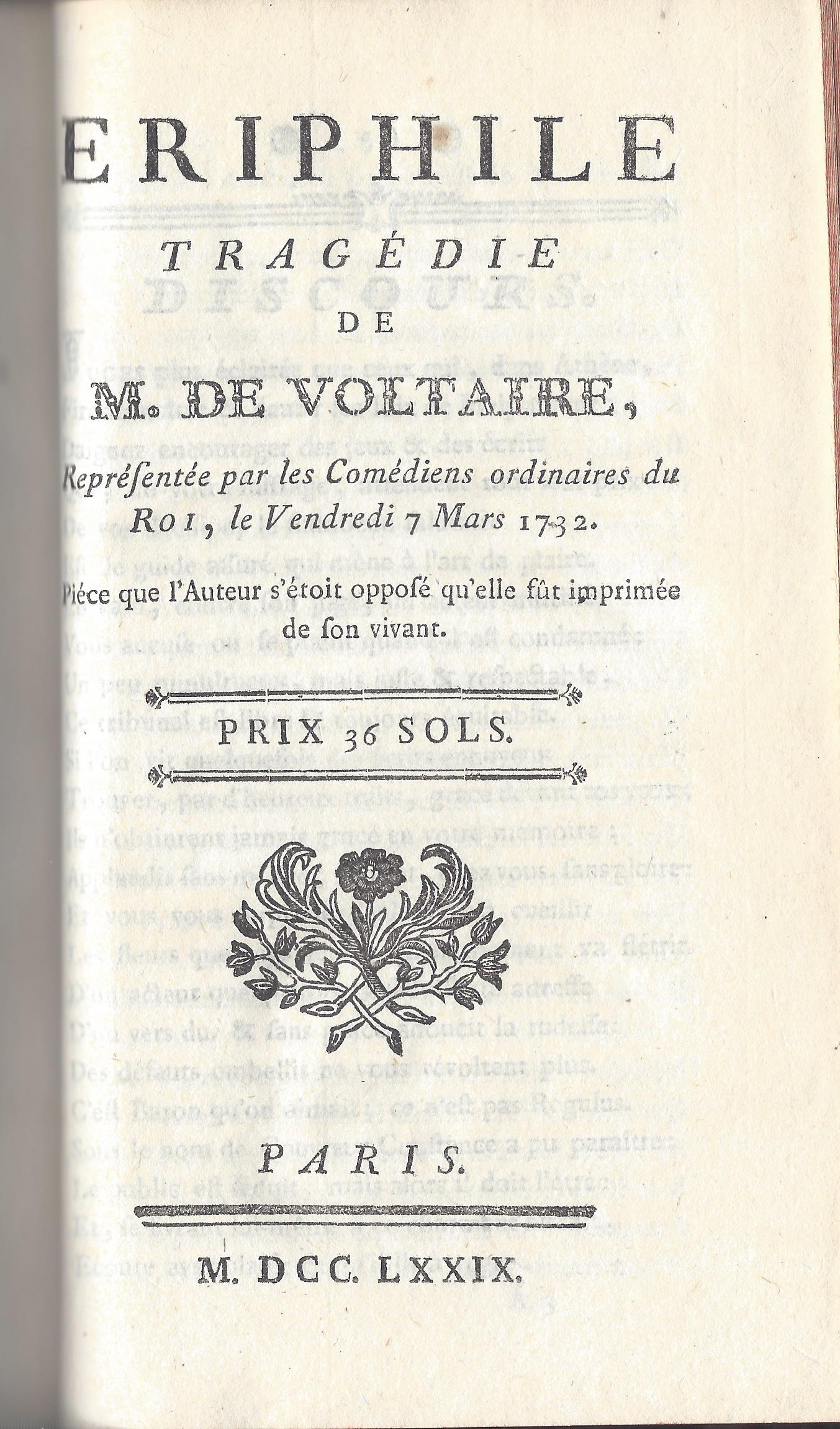
Frontispiece of the first unauthorised printing of Voltaire's Ériphyle, Paris 1779

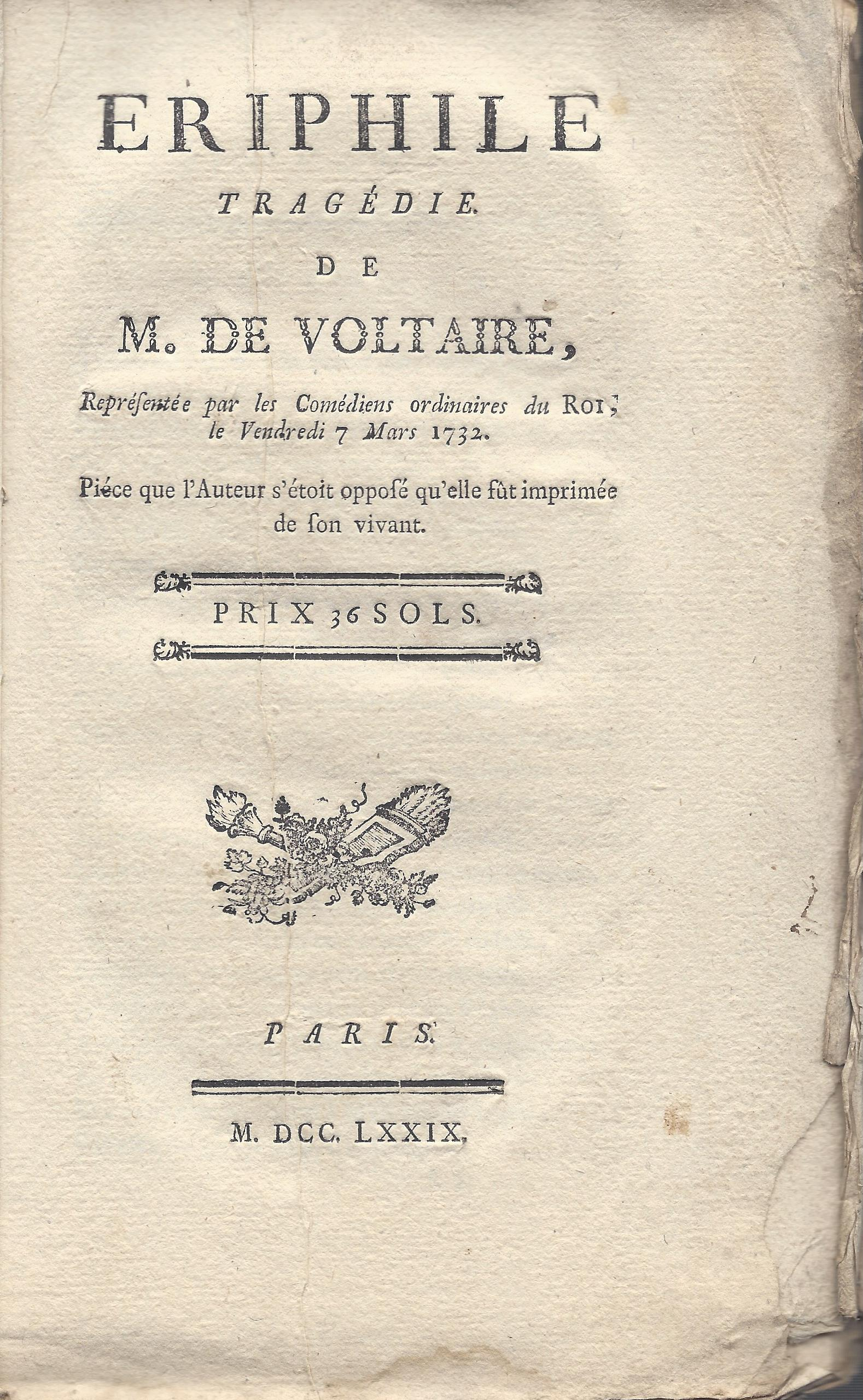
Frontispiece of the second unauthorised printing of Voltaire's Ériphyle, Paris 1779

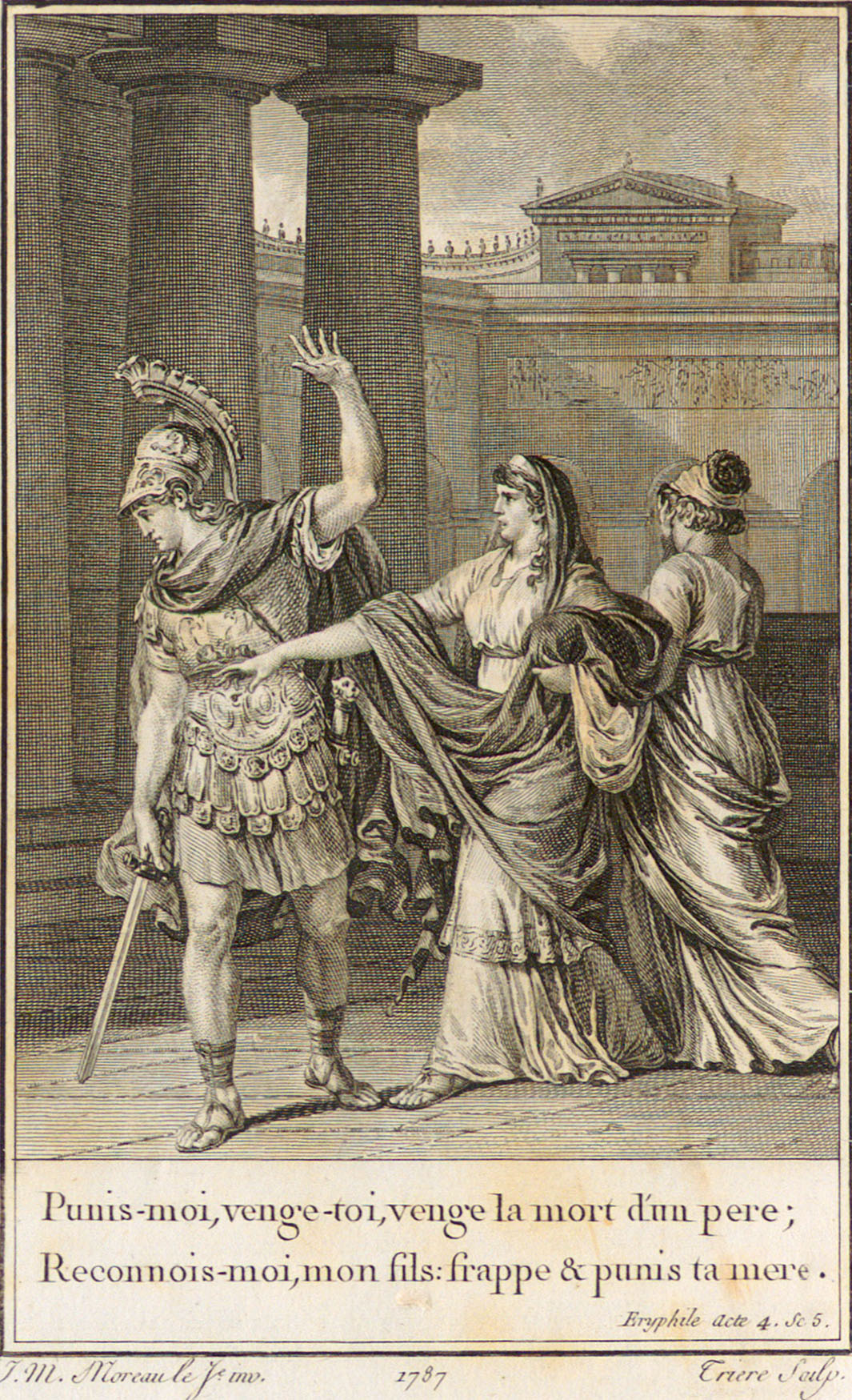
Jean-Michel Moreau: Illustration of Ériphyle 1786

Ériphyle is a tragedy in five acts by Voltaire. He began working on it in 1731 and it was completed and performed in 1732. The poor success of the stage premiere prompted Voltaire to cancel the printed version.

== Action ==
Voltaire drew his material from Bayle's Dictionnaire historique et critique as well as from the classical original in the Bibliotheca of Pseudo-Apollodorus. The action takes place in the temple of Jupiter at Argos. Eriphyle, married to the king and commander Amphiaraos, nevertheless maintains a relationship with his rival and enemy, Hermogide. Amphiaraos falls victim to a plot.

Alcméon, promoted to commander by Hermongide, falls in love with the queen. The spirit of his father appears to him to the temple, demanding revenge and the high priest proves to Alcméon that he is the son of Amphiaraos, long believed dead. In his struggle with Hermongide, Alcméon accidentally kills his mother.

== Composition and reception ==
The play was written at great speed while Voltaire spent several months in Rouen to focus on his work. In June 1731 Voltaire said he had written it, together with La Mort de César and Histoire de Charles XII in just three months. In September of the same year he felt that despite further work the play was not yet worthy of the public, or of himself. He continued revising it intensively right up to the first performance. The numerous reworkings of the scene in which Alcméon kills his mother were intended to ensure the effect Voltaire sought as with his other scenes of matricide (in Oreste and Sémiramis); not to shock the audience but to reintroduce to French tragedy the element of 'terror' which Voltaire felt had been lost as a result of the taste for gallantry on stage.

Voltaire's correspondence in March 1732 with Moncrif, secretary to the Comte de Clermont, indicates that the actors of the Comédie-Française may have been reluctant to perform the play: Voltaire wanted to dedicate the work to Clermont and urged Moncrif to ensure that his master recommended the work to them, so they knew it enjoyed his patronage.

The play premiered at the Comédie-Française on 7 March 1732. Voltaire made revisions to it until the beginning of May. The last of the total of twelve performances was on 1 May 1732. Critical reception, particularly in Mercure de France, was lukewarm. Although box office receipts for the premiere of 3,970 livres do not indicate that the play was a flop, it did not meet Voltaire's own expectations. The appearance of a ghost in the play, unusual in French drama, was one element to which the public did not respond well.

== Printed versions ==
Voltaire had already commissioned the printing of the work from a trusted publisher, fr:Claude-François Jore of Rouen, with whom he was to quarrel two years later. The last changes and corrections were sent to his friend Cideville on 8 May, but the very next day he wrote again insisting that the printing be stopped and the manuscript returned. He continued to work on it for many months after this, while working on new projects, but for the rest of his life he refused to publish the play, but borrowed verses from the manuscript for his later tragedies Mérope and Sémiramis.

Voltaire's final trip to Paris in 1778 and the staging of Irène led to the printing, by an unknown publisher, of an error-filled stage version of the manuscript which had been retained by the actor Lekain. This version was the basis for the later Kehl edition. The 1877 Moland edition derives from a different manuscript version, owned by Voltaire's secretary Sébastien G. Longchamp (1718–1793).
