= Polish question =

Historical debate about whether Poland should exist as a state

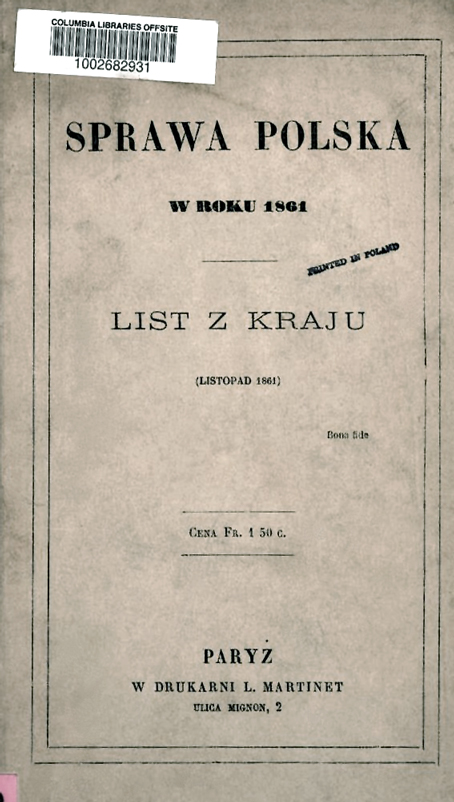
Book cover Sprawa polska w roku 1861. List z kraju (Listopad 1861). English: The Polish Question in 1861. Letter from the Homeland (November 1861) published in Polish by L. Martinet publishing, Paris

The Polish question (Polish: kwestia polska or sprawa polska) was the issue, in international politics, of the existence of Poland as an independent state. Raised soon after the partitions of Poland in the late 18th century, it became a question current in European and American diplomacy throughout the 19th and parts of the 20th centuries. Historian Norman Davies notes that the Polish question is the primary lens through which most histories of Europe discuss the history of Poland, and was one of the most common topics of European politics for close to two centuries. The Polish question was a major topic at all major European peace conferences: at the Congress of Vienna in 1815, at the Versailles Conference in 1919, and at the Yalta Conference and the Potsdam Conference in 1945. As Piotr Wandycz writes, "What to the Poles was the Polish cause, to the outside world was the Polish question."

== History ==
After late-18th-century partitions of Poland, the Polish–Lithuanian Commonwealth ceased to exist, divided between the Austrian Empire, the Kingdom of Prussia and the Russian Empire. Poland’s erasure from Europe became a key to maintaining the European balance of power over the next century. The term "Polish question" came into use shortly afterwards, as some Great Powers took interest in upsetting this status quo, hoping to benefit from the recreation of the Polish state, starting with France under Napoleon Bonaparte, who considered the Poles useful recruits in his wars with Poland's occupying powers. The term "Polish question" was heard again after the failed November Uprising of 1831, during the "Spring of Nations" in 1848–49, and again after the unsuccessful January Uprising of 1863, in which Poles and Lithuanians rebelled against the Russian Empire, trying to restore their country's independence. In the era of rising nationalism, the question of whether an independent Poland should be restored, and also what it meant to be a Pole, gained increasing notoriety. In the decades that followed, the term became less used, as no new major uprisings occurred in Poland to draw the world's attention. The issue was further assuaged by the fact that the three partitioning powers were common allies for over a century (cf. League of the Three Emperors and Holy Alliance), and their diplomacy successfully kept the issue suppressed so that no serious solution appeared in sight. Out of the three partitioning powers, for Prussia the Polish question was one of fundamental importance, as Prussia's existence was connected to the Polish state being vanquished.

The Polish question resurfaced with force during World War I, when the partitioning powers fought one another, leading them to attempts to court their respective Polish citizens. In his memorandum of 20 January 1914, Russian Foreign Minister Sazonov proposed the restoration of an autonomous Kingdom of Poland with the Polish language used in schools and local administration, to which eastern Silesia, Western Galicia and eastern Poznan would be attached after the war, and on 16 August 1914 he persuaded the Tsar that Russia should seek reintegration of a unified Polish state as one of its war aims.

In 1916, Germany, with the Act of 5th November, publicly promised to create the Regency Kingdom of Poland, while secretly planning to annex up to 35,000 square kilometres of its territory and ethnically cleanse up to 3 million Poles and Jews to make room for German settlers after the war. This caused the French parliament to comment that the manifesto "stamped the Polish question with an international character". Russia protested the move, as it saw its own rump Polish state, the Congress Kingdom (or Vistula Land) as the only "Poland" that mattered. Soon, however, the Russians followed the German move, and promised the Poles increased autonomy. This offer was mentioned in the United States in Woodrow Wilson's "Peace Without Victory" speech of 1917. The Polish question was temporarily solved with the restoration of Polish independence after World War I.

The term became once again relevant before and during World War II due to the establishment of the Polish Corridor and the Free City of Danzig, as well as the 1920 East Prussian plebiscite, all of which resulted in German territory being split in two by Poland's. Territorial tensions between the Second Polish Republic and Weimar Republic resulted in a customs war in the 1920s and 1930s, until Poland's declaration of non-aggression with Nazi Germany. Hostilities resumed in 1938 due to Germany's claims over Danzig and Adolf Hitler denounced the non-agression declaration on 28 April 1939. According to a conversation in August 1939 before the outbreak of World War II, published in the British War Blue Book, Hitler told British ambassador Nevile Henderson, "I am an artist and not a politician. Once the Polish question is settled, I want to end my life as an artist." The 1939 invasion of Poland by Nazi Germany and the Soviet Union resulted in Poland being split between Germany, the Soviet Union and the rump General Government. The future of occupied Poland became once again an issue of debate between the Great Powers of the time, namely the United Kingdom, the United States and the Soviet Union.

The term was also used later in the 20th century, in the 1980s during the Solidarność period, when opposition activists struggled to free the People's Republic of Poland from the domination of the Soviet Bloc.

== See also ==
- Polish Independence Day commemorating the end to 123 years of partition
- Territorial evolution of Poland
- The Troelfth Cake allegory for the First Partition of Poland
- Eastern question posed by the decay of the Ottoman Empire
- Armenian question, a similar topic about Armenians
- Jewish question pertaining to European Jews
- German question
