= Jean-Baptiste Descamps =

Flemish art historian (1714–1791)

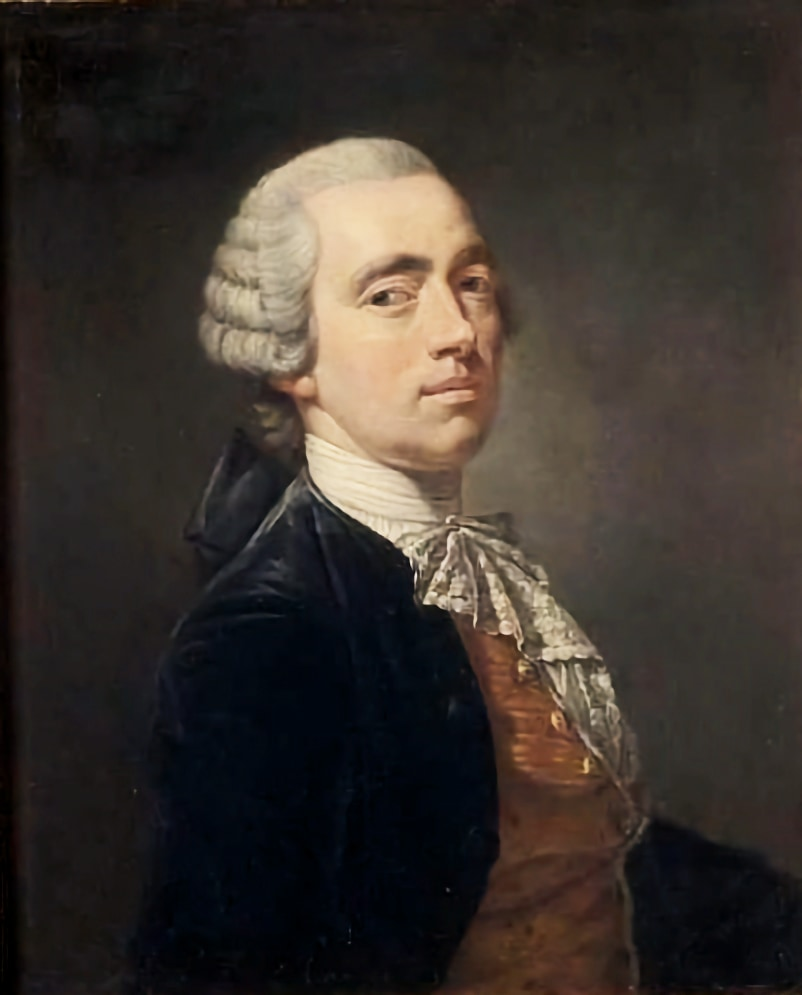
Self-portrait, c. 1762

Jean-Baptiste Descamps (French: [ʒɑ̃.ba.tist de.kɑ̃]; 28 August 1714, Dunkerque – 30 June 1791, Rouen) was a French writer on art and artists, and painter of village scenes. He later founded an academy of art and his son later became a museum curator.

== Biography ==
Descamps was born in Dunkerque, and trained by his father to become a Jesuit. He preferred to study art and became a pupil of Pierre Dulin, Nicolas Lancret and Nicolas de Largillierre at the Académie Royale de Peinture et de Sculpture in Paris.

Accompanying Charles-André van Loo on a trip to England in 1740–1741 after his training, he formed an acquaintance with Pierre-Robert Le Cornier de Cideville, the friend of Voltaire. Le Cornier de Cideville, anxious for the honor of his native town of Rouen, persuaded the young artist to select it as the place of his future residence. Once settled in 1741, Descamps set up a studio and helped his new friend found a tuition-free art school in 1749, the Academy of Rouen. The school followed the basic ideas of the Philosophes of the Enlightenment. This school was to play a key role in the development of pictorial art in Normandy, and Descamps would direct this academy until he died. When Descamps wrote a memoir about this school for the French Academy, he was awarded a prize in 1767.

Besides his son Marc-Antoine Descamps, his pupils were Charles Eschard, François Godefroy, François Gonord, Etienne de Lavallée-Poussin, Charles Le Carpentier, Noël Le Mire, Jean-Jacques Le Veau, Anicet Charles Gabriel Lemonnier, and Jean-Jacques Lequeu.

== Works ==
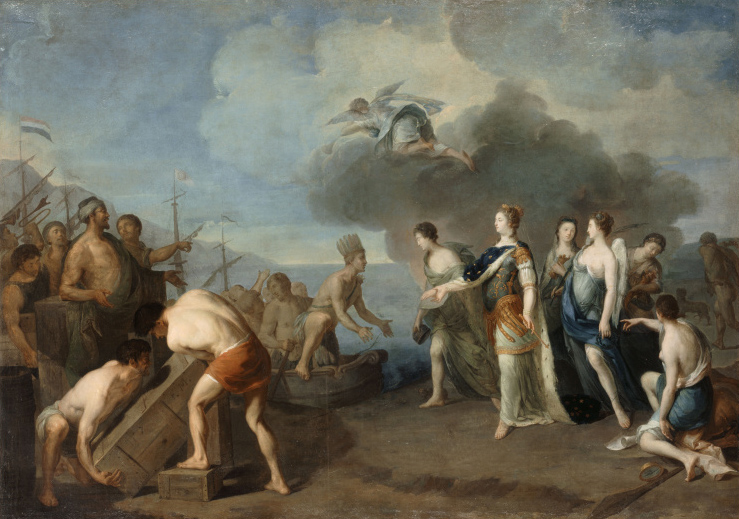
Allegory of the discovery of America Painting attributed to Jean-Baptiste Descamps.

Descamps painted popular genre subjects in the manner of Jean-Baptiste Greuze. He became a member of the Académie Royale in Paris in 1764 and exhibited works at the Salon of 1765.

As a teacher, he began writing instructional works, most notably his French translations of artist biographies by Karel van Mander and Arnold Houbraken in his 4-volume La Vie des Peintres Flamands, Allemands et Hollandois. He hired Charles Eisen to illustrate these works with engravings of the artists accompanied by examples of their work. Most of the portrait engravings are copies after Houbraken's originals.

=== The Lives of Flemish, German, and Dutch painters ===
Though the RKD records his artist membership in 1764, Descamps was already a literary member of the Académie Royale des Science when he published his La Vie... series of painter biographies in the 1750s and by the time he published his third volume in 1760, he was also a member of the Académie Impériale Franciscienne.

- 1753: La Vie des Peintres Flamands, Allemands et Hollandois, avec des portraits gravés en Taille-douce, une indication de leurs principaux Ouvrages, & des réflexions sur leurs différentes manieres, M J.B. Descamps, Peintre, Membre l'Académie Royale des Science, Belle-Lettres, & Art de Rouen, & Professeur de l'Ecole du Dessein de la méme Ville, Tome Premier, A Paris, chez Charles-Antoine Jombert, Libraire du Roi pour l'Artillerie & le Génie, rue Dauphine, à l'Image de Notre-Dame, M D CC LIII, Avec Approbation et Privilege du Roi
- 1754: La Vie des Peintres Flamands, Allemands et Hollandois, avec des portraits gravés en Taille-douce, une indication de leurs principaux Ouvrages, & des réflexions sur leurs différentes manieres, M J.B. Descamps, Peintre, Membre l'Académie Royale des Science, Belle-Lettres, & Art de Rouen, & Professeur de l'Ecole du Dessein de la méme Ville, Tome Second, A Paris, chez Charles-Antoine Jombert, Libraire du Roi pour l'Artillerie & le Génie, rue Dauphine, à l'Image de Notre-Dame, M D CC LIV, Avec Approbation et Privilege du Roi
- 1760: La Vie des Peintres Flamands, Allemands et Hollandois, avec des portraits gravés en Taille-douce, une indication de leurs principaux Ouvrages, & des réflexions sur leurs différentes manieres, Par M J.B. Descamps, Peintre, Membre l'Académie Impériale Franciscienne, de celle des Sciences, Belle-Lettres, & Art de Rouen, & Professeur de l'Ecole du Dessein de la méme Ville, Tome Troisieme, A Paris, chez Desaint & Saillant, rue de S. Jean de Beauvais, Pissot, Quai de Conty, Durand, rue de Foin, M D C LX, Avec Approbation et Privilege du Roi
- 1764: La Vie des Peintres Flamands, Allemands et Hollandois, avec des portraits gravés en Taille-douce, une indication de leurs principaux Ouvrages, & des réflexions sur leurs différentes manieres, Par M J.B. Descamps, Peintre, Membre l'Académie Impériale Franciscienne, de celle des Sciences, Belle-Lettres, & Art de Rouen, & Professeur de l'Ecole du Dessein de la méme Ville, Tome Quatrieme, A Paris, chez Desaint & Saillant, rue de S. Jean de Beauvais, Pissot, Quai de Conty, Durand, le Neveu, rue S. Jacques, au coin de la rue du Platre, M D CC LXIV, Avec Approbation et Privilege du Roi
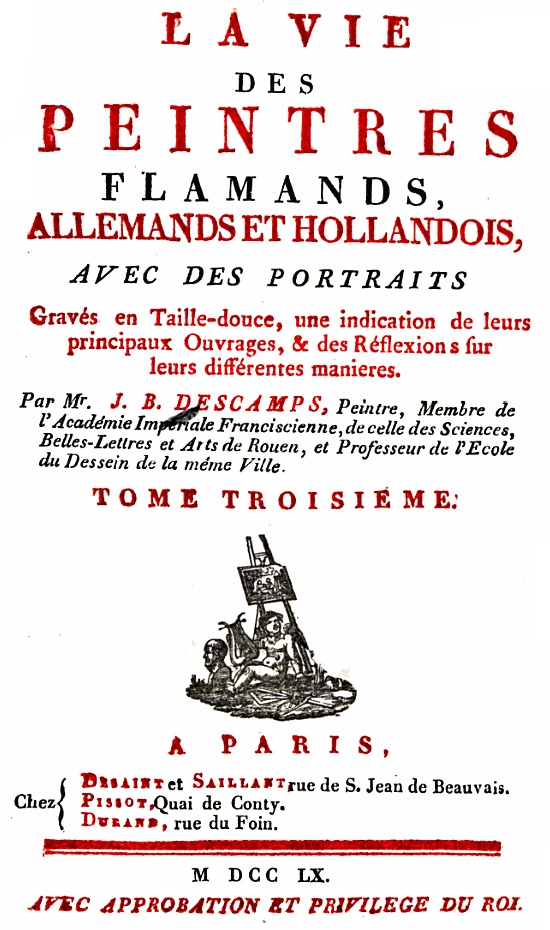
"La Vie", Tome Troisieme, 1760

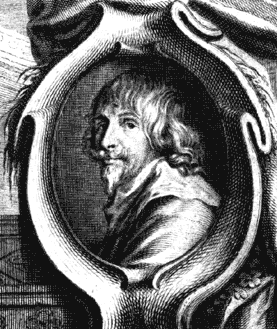
Hendrik van Steenwijk II, "Tome Premier", illustration by Charles Eisen

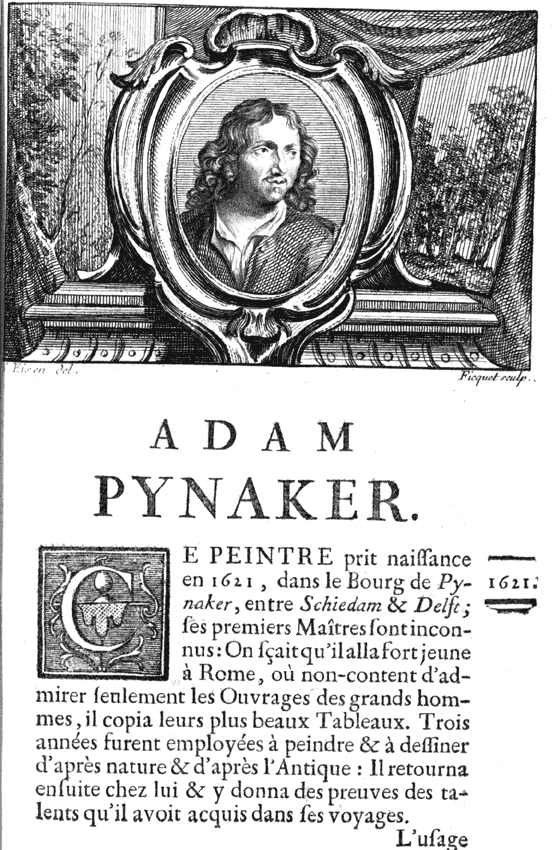
Adam Pynaker, "Tome Second", illustration by Charles Eisen

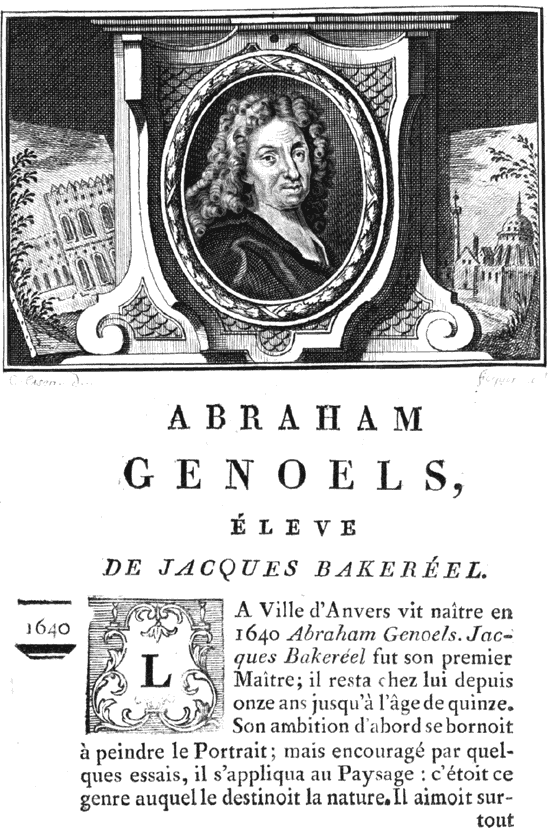
Abraham Genoels, "Tome Troisième", illustration by Charles Eisen

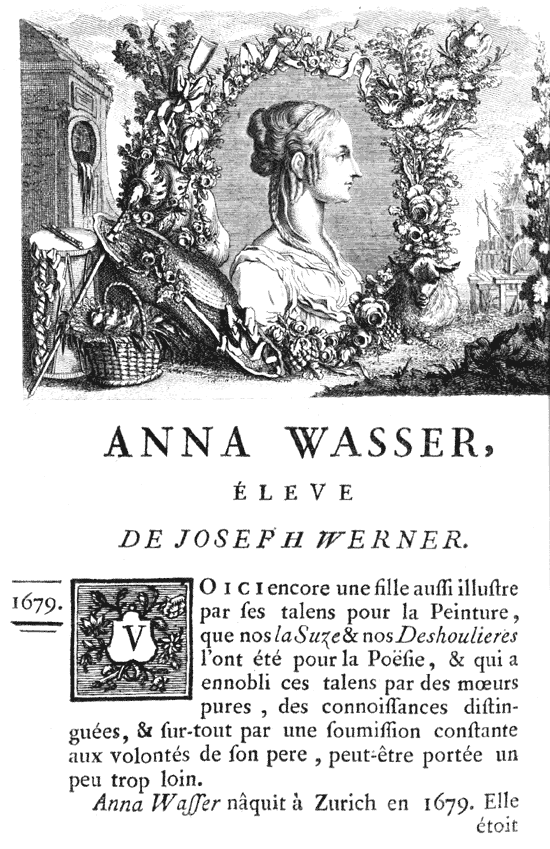
Anna Wasser pupil of Joseph Werner, "Tome Quatrieme", illustration by Charles Eisen

=== Churches of Flanders and Brabant ===
In 1769 he wrote the book Voyage pittoresque de la Flandre et du Brabant, which describes the towns and principal churches of Flanders and Brabant with their artworks.

Through these works he renewed the interest in the Old Flemish masters, especially Hans Memling and Jan van Eyck. They also had the adverse effect of being used by the French Revolutionary Army, after their invasion of Flanders in 1790, to requisition the best paintings for transport to the Musée Central des Arts in the Louvre, Paris.
