= Anna Waser =

Swiss artist (1678–1714)

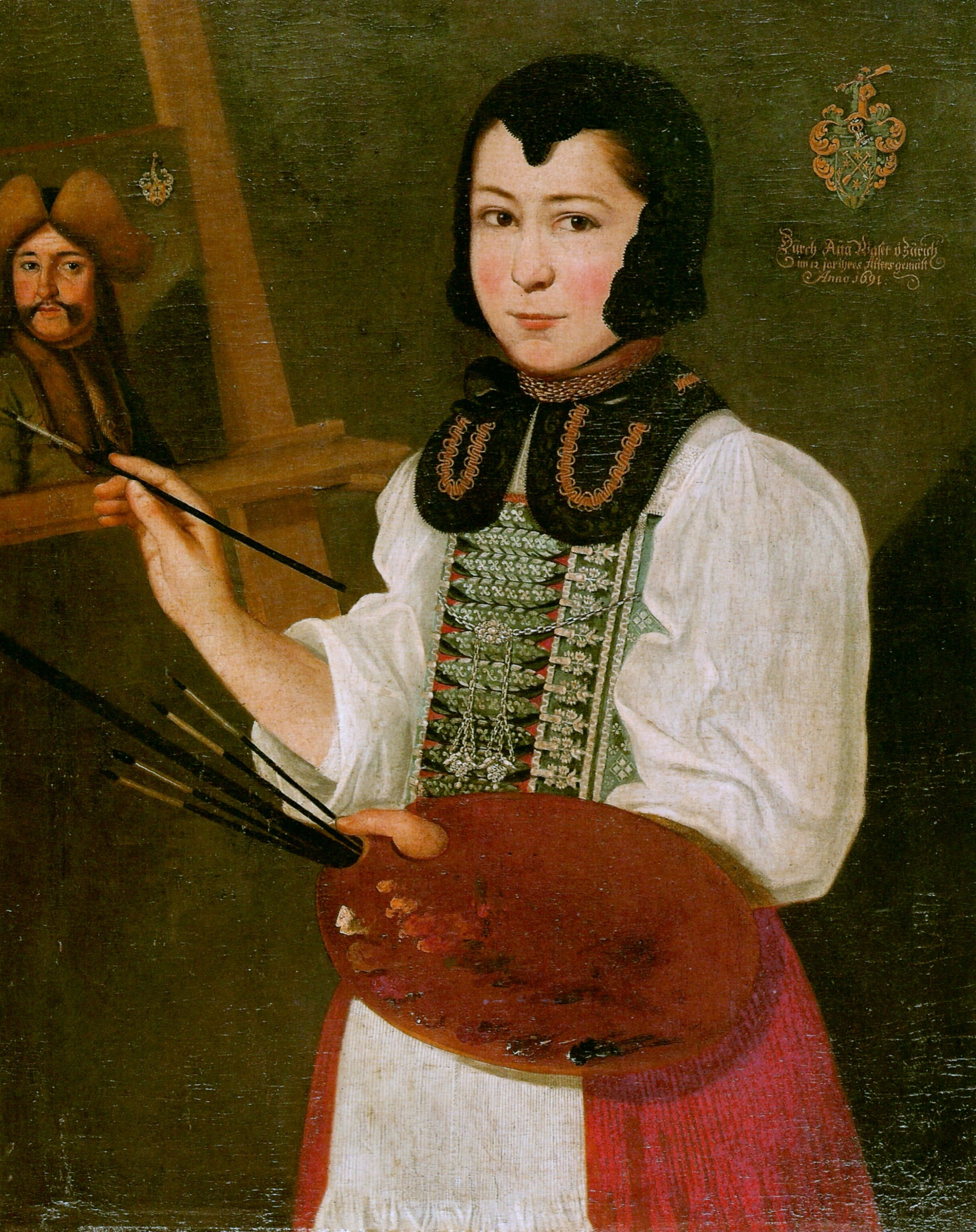
- Self-portrait, 1691
- Born: 16 October 1678; Zurich
- Died: 20 September 1714 (aged 35)
- Known for: painting

Anna Waser (16 October 1678 – 20 September 1714) was a Swiss painter.

== Life ==
Anna Waser was born in 1678, the fifth child of a wealthy and respected family in Zurich.

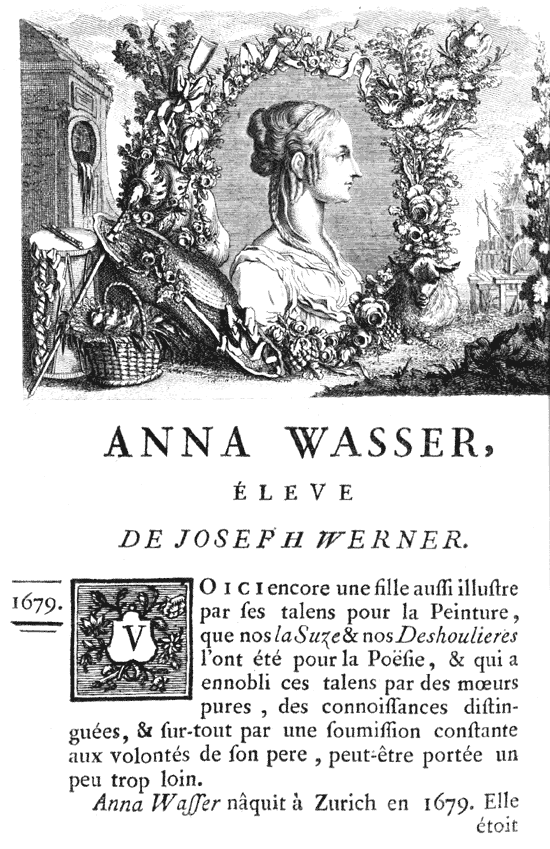
"Wasser" featured with engraved portrait in part IV of the 4 part series by Jean-Baptiste Descamps, "La vie des peintres flamands, allemands et hollandois", 1764

According to Jean-Baptiste Descamps she was born in Zurich in 1679 and became a pupil of Joseph Werner. According to the RKD she was born a year earlier and was an engraver and miniature painter.

Her parents were Esther Müller and the bailiff Johann Rudolf Waser, an educated man who promoted the talent of his daughter. He had her trained as a painter, despite all social conventions. When she could not learn anything from her first teacher Johannes Sulzer, she went at fourteen to Bern to study with Joseph Werner, one of the leading Swiss painters. Four years she remained as the only girl among his male students, in his "learning workshop for painting". Then she returned to her family in Zurich. There they received portrait commissions from the large circle. Also outside the city people became aware of the young painter. In 1699 Anna Waser, now 21 years old, was appointed by the art-loving Count Wilhelm Moritz von Solms-Braunfels as court painter to his Schloss Braunfels an der Lahn in Hessen.

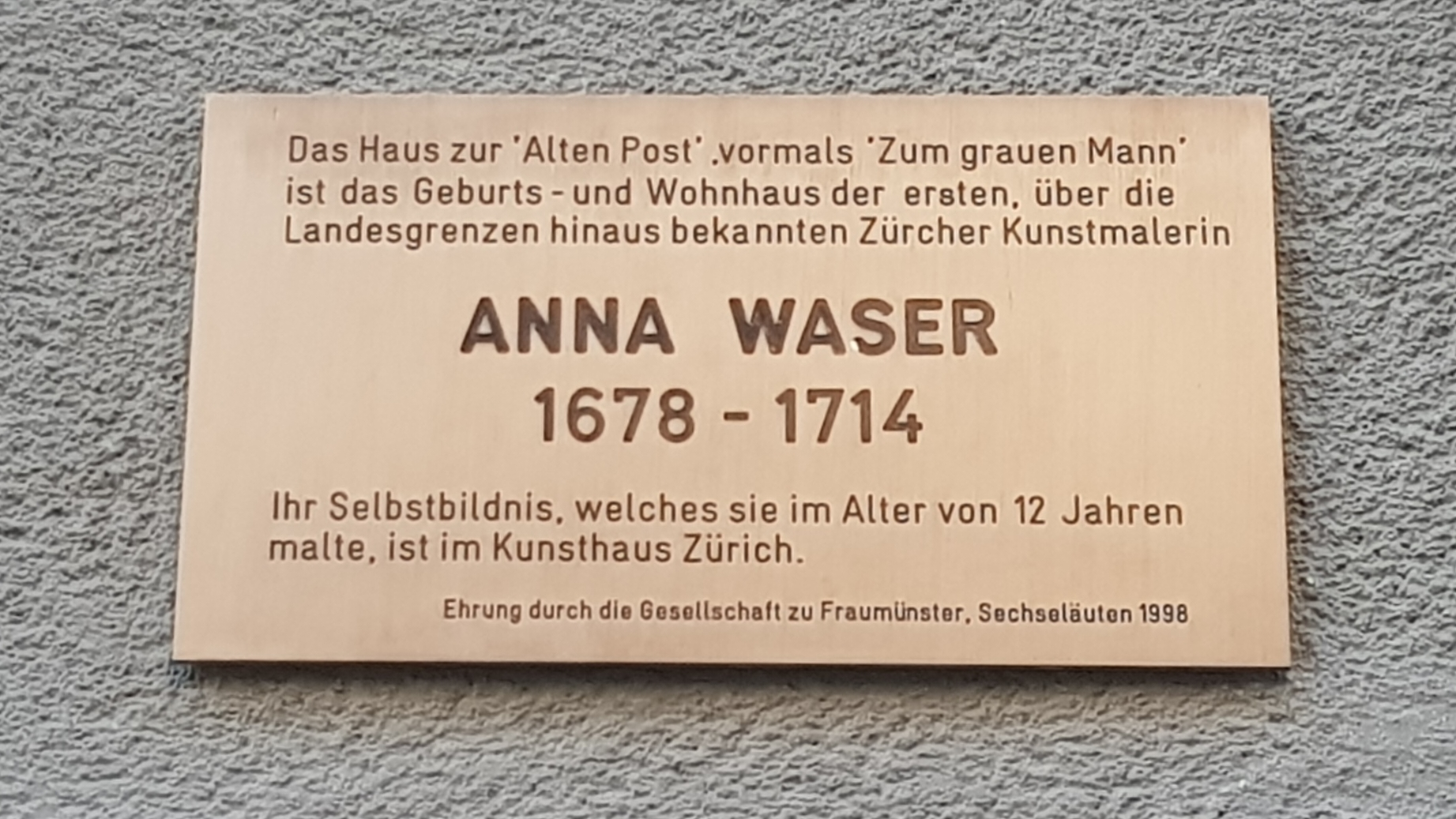
Commemorative plaque at the house «Zur Alten Post», Münstergasse 19, Zurich

Instead of a planned trip to Paris, she was asked back to Zurich, because her mother was ill and her brother Johann Rudolf, a tutor in Braunfels, decided to travel as a military chaplain to Holland. From about 1702, she now had to look after the home of her parents, and her painting suffered. She painted only here and there a portrait or a few pastoral scenes, for which she had at that time been famous. In 1708, together with her sisters Anna Maria and Elisabeth Waser, she continued some drawings. They finally sent her autobiography, a program executed in silver point technique Self-portrait and other works of art to Jacob von Sandrart for a scheduled update of his art lexicon Teutsche Academie. In 1714 Anna Waser died at the age of 35 years as the consequence of a fall.

== Legacy ==
In 1998 Anna Waser's work was honoured by the Gesellschaft zu Fraumünster.

== Sources ==
- Gottfried Sello: Malerinnen aus fünf Jahrhunderten. Ellert und Richter, Hamburg 1988, ISBN 3-89234-077-3.
- Maria Waser: Die Geschichte der Anna Waser - Ein Roman aus der Wende des 17. Jahrhunderts. Deutsche Verlags-Anstalt, Stuttgart 1913 (Digitalisat der Auflage 1922); Neuauflage: Classen, Zürich 1978, ISBN 3-7172-0279-0
- Clara Erskine Clement Waters, Women in the Fine Arts, 1904, pp. 355–356
- Henry Gardiner Adams (1857). A Cyclopædia of Female Biography: Consisting of Sketches of All Women who Have Been Distinguished by Great Talents, Strength of Character, Piety, Benevolence Or Moral Virtue of Any Kind : Forming a Complete Record of Womanly Excellence Or Ability. Groombridge. pp. 764–.
