= Twelfth cake =

Twelfth cake may refer to:

- a king cake, baked for the festival of Twelfth Night
- The Troelfth Cake, a satirical drawing of the Partition of Poland
