= Pierre-Robert Le Cornier de Cideville =

French magistrate and scholar

Le Cornier de Cideville
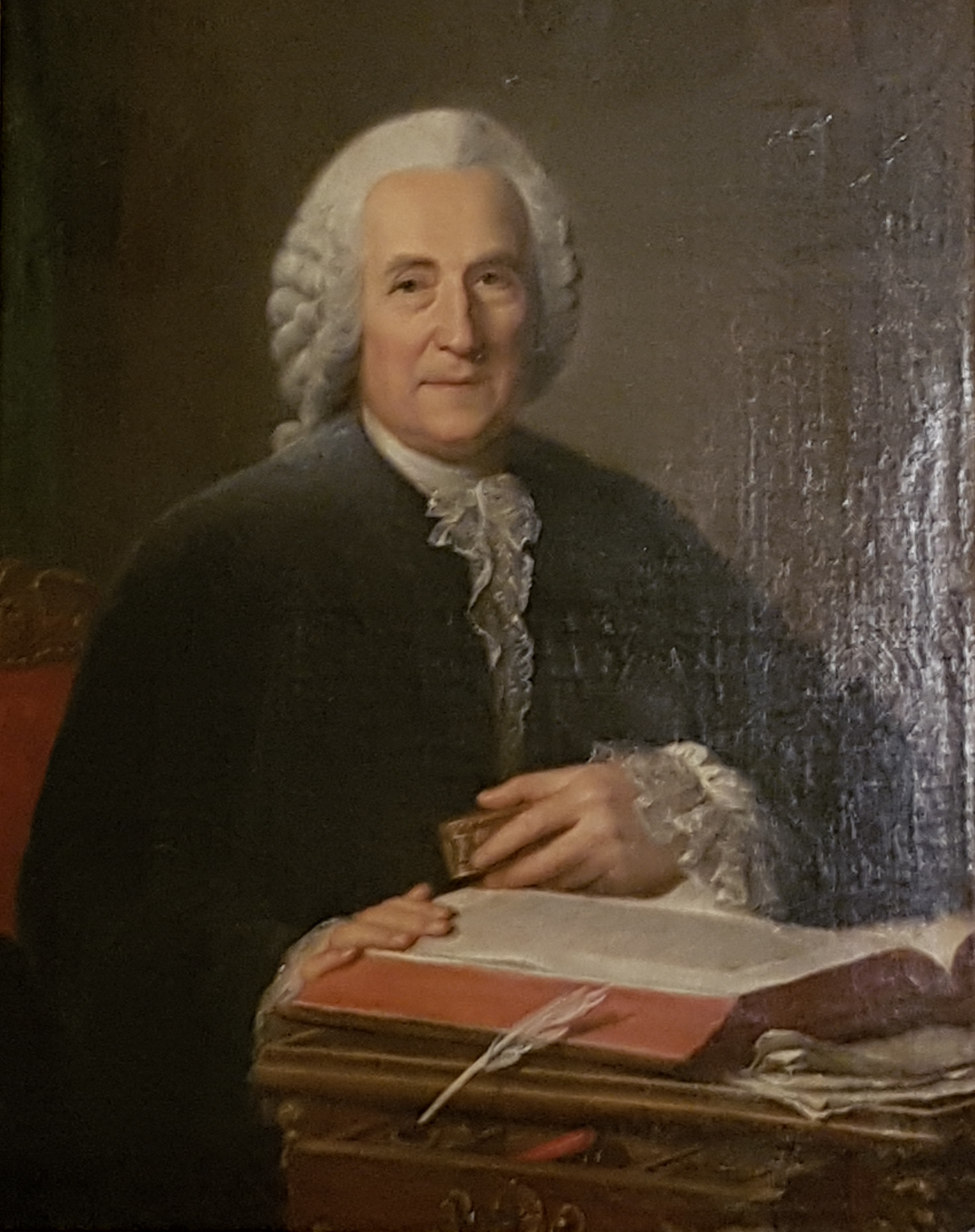
- Born: 2 September 1693; Rouen
- Died: 5 March 1776 (aged 82); Paris
- Known for: Co-founder of the Academy of Rouen

Pierre Robert Le Cornier de Cideville (2 September 1693 – 5 March 1776), was a French magistrate and scholar, co-founder of the Academy of Rouen.

Cideville, who was born at Rouen (Normandy), the descendant by his mother, of the poet Chapelle, Boileau and Molière's merry companion.

He succeeded his father in his position of councilor to the Parliament of Normandy. In addition to his assiduous study of law, he managed to dabble in music, painting and poetry, having, at age eighteen, won a prize at the Palinods Academy of Rouen.

Cideville was Voltaire's classmate at the Lycée Louis-le-Grand, and the latter professed, fifty years later, that they still were friends. In fact, Voltaire held Cideville's literary judgment in such high esteem that he did not hesitate to submit his writings to his review. Voltaire even came to seek refuge at his home in 1730 when legal action had been taken against him for some of his works. He allegedly wrote Éryphile et La Mort de César during his stay in Normandy.

The correspondence of this major figure of the Enlightenment in the provinces with Voltaire is a treasure trove for scholars of that era. Cideville possessed an epigrammatic talent which is evidenced in one of his letters where his recounts his pen-friend how Voltaire had to leave very hastily Déville on the day a farmer he had cured from a fever, mistook him for a sorcerer.

Le Cornier of Cideville co-founded, along with Fontenelle, the Academy of Rouen, and he drafted its charter. He also endowed Rouen with a tuition-free art school, which was to play a key role in the development of pictorial art in Normandy, when he managed to persuade Descamps, who was on his way to England, to settle in Rouen instead before appointing him as its principal.

Although they never went into print, there exists, among the manuscripts he bequeathed, along with his extensive library, to the Academy of Rouen, a collection entitled Poésies diverses et curieuses. A second part of this collection entitled Journal depuis juin 1743 jusqu’en 1775, can be found, with a portrait of its author, at the Public Library of Rouen.

When Cideville died at Paris, on 5 March 1776, his eulogy was delivered at the Academy of Rouen by Jean-Baptiste Haillet de Couronne.

== Bibliography ==
- Voltaire inédit (notes to Cideville, counterfeiting of its works à Rouen, correspondence of Cideville with Voltaire, of Mme Du Châtelet with Cideville), Éd. J. Noury, Paris, Impr. nationale, 1895.
- À Monsieur de Voltaire, historiographe de France, Paris, Prault fils, 1745.

== Sources ==
- Théodore-Éloi Lebreton (1858). Biographie normande: recueil de notices biographiques et bibliographiques sur les personnages célèbres nés en Normandie et sur ceux qui se sont seulement distingués par leurs actions ou par leurs écrits (in French). Rouen: A. Le Brument. pp. 314–5.
