= Gesellschaft zu Fraumünster =

- Gesellschaft zu Fraumünster
- Founded: 1989
- Location: Switzerland
- Key people: Regula Zweifel, Hohe Fraumünster-Frau
- Website: Official website (in German)

Gesellschaft zu Fraumünster is a guild–like organisation in Zürich, Switzerland, not yet associated with the Zünfte of Zürich as of 2015.

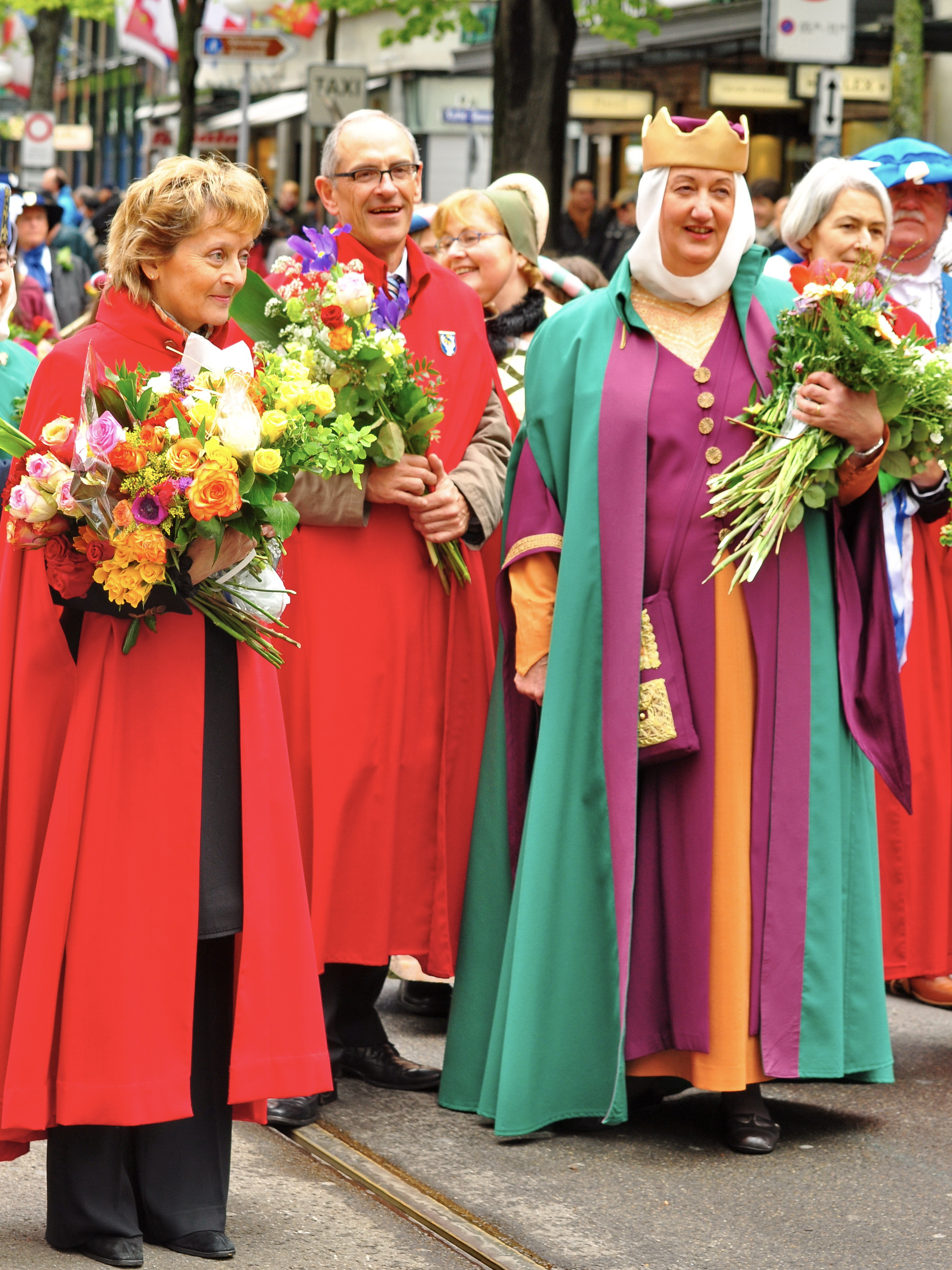
Eveline Widmer-Schlumpf as guest of the Fraumünster association in 2012

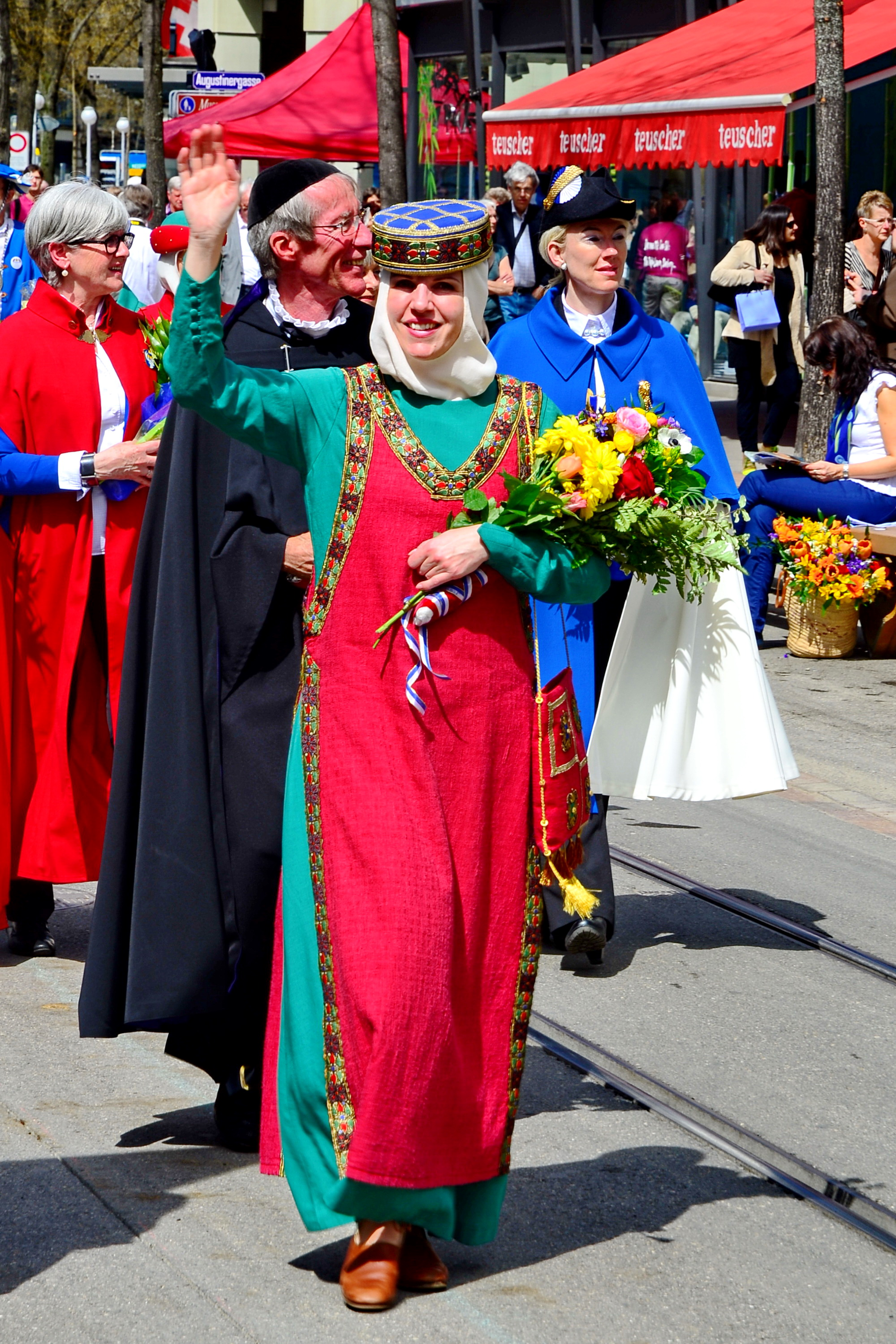
Historical clothing of the women of the society

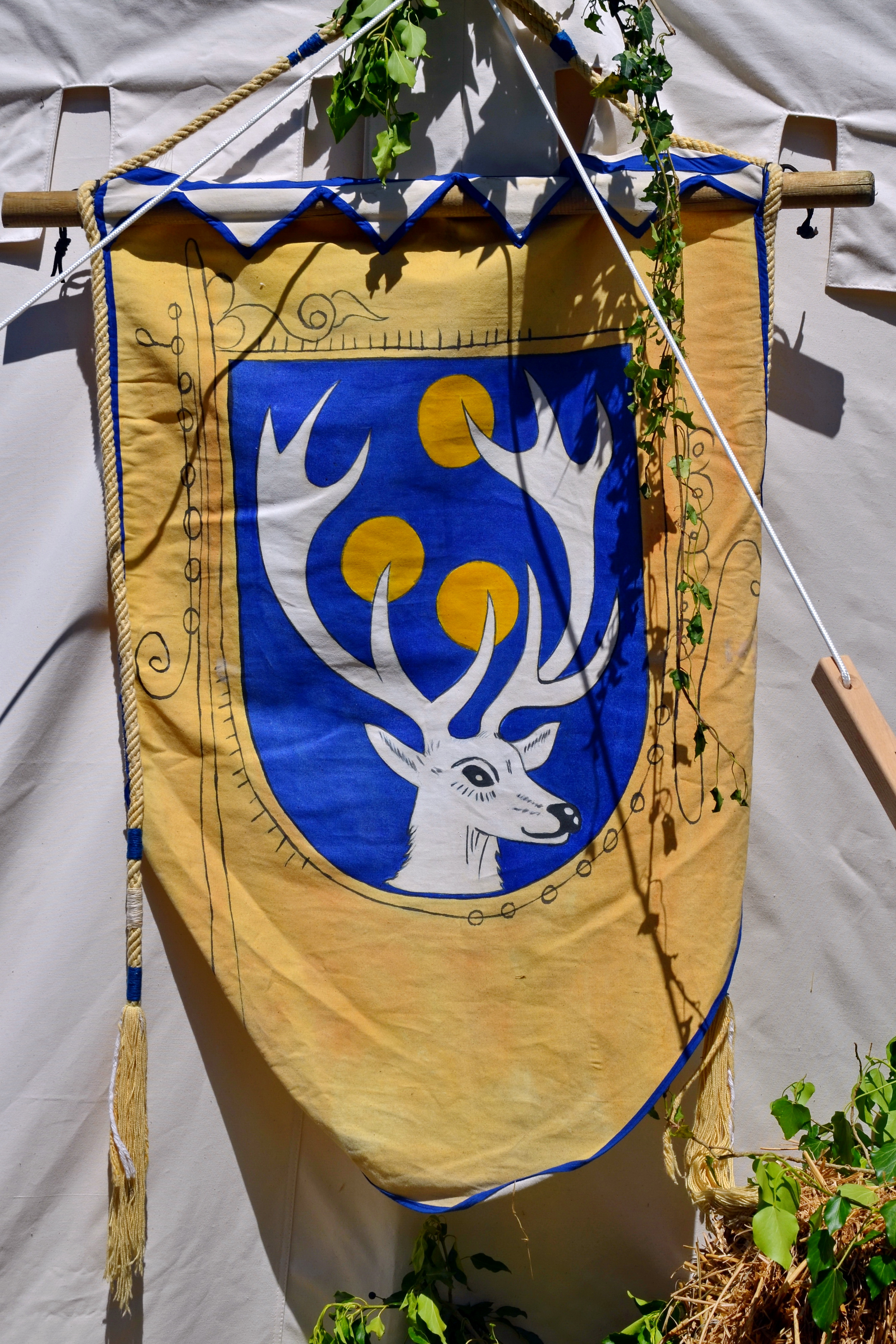
Flag of the society

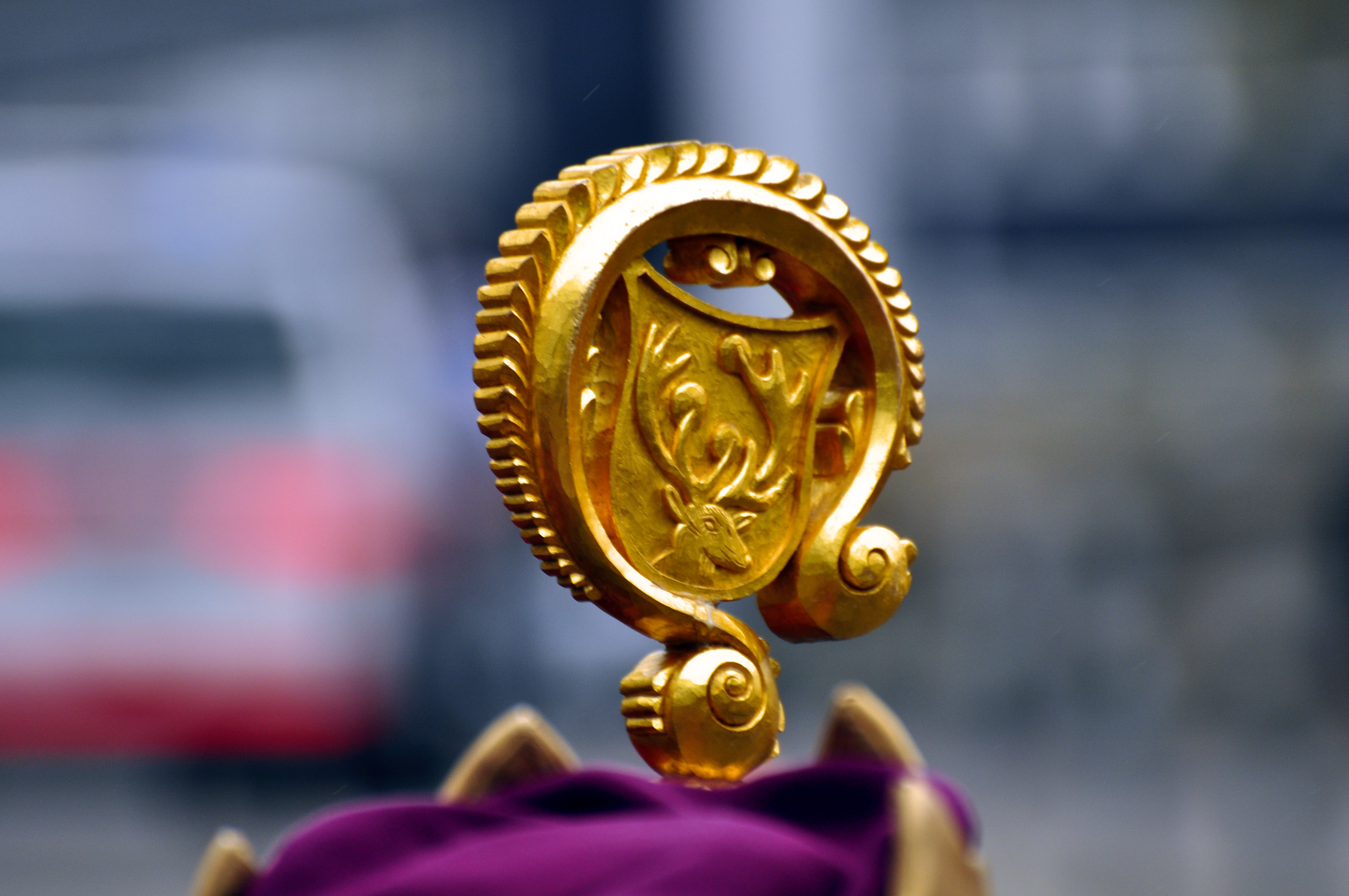

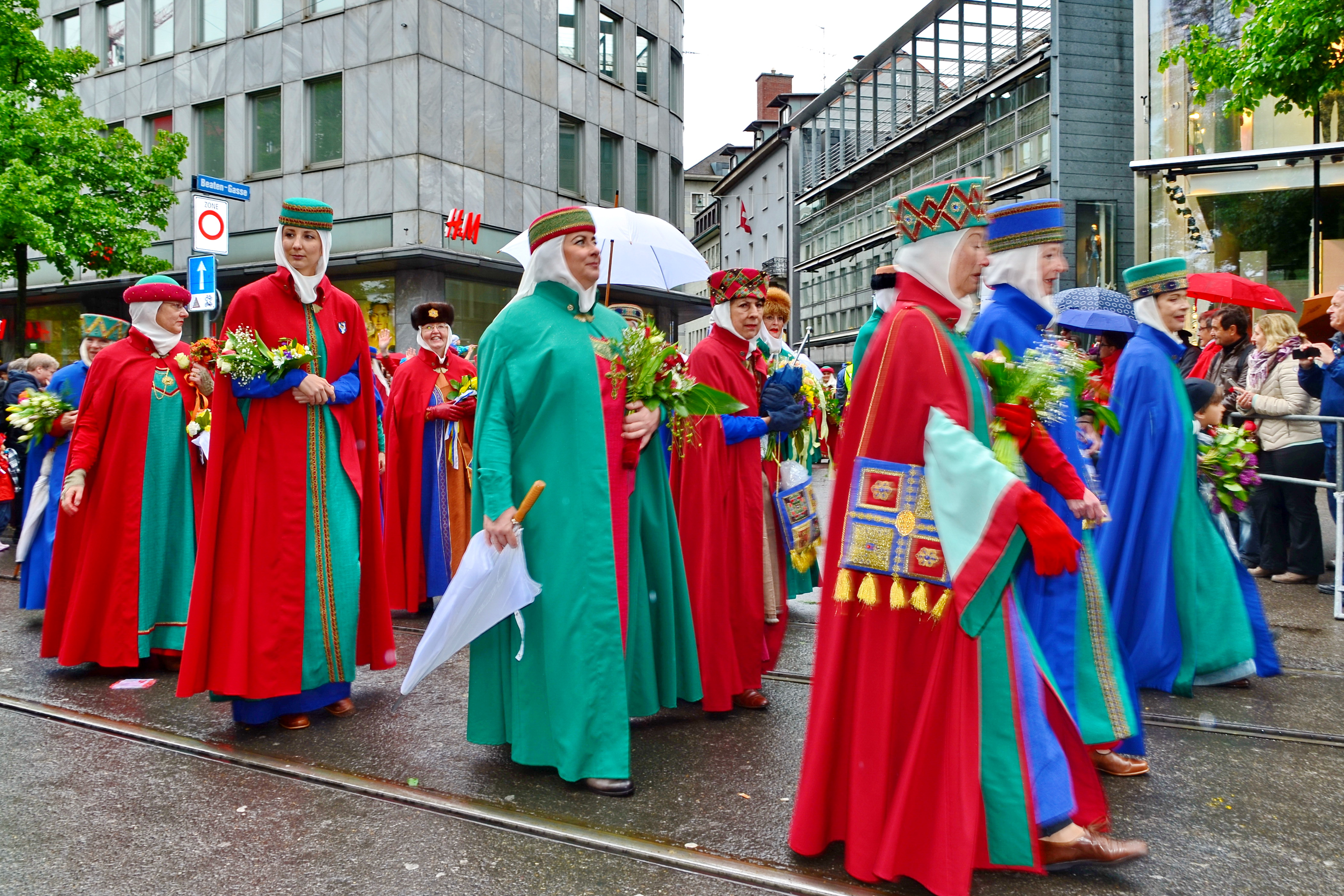

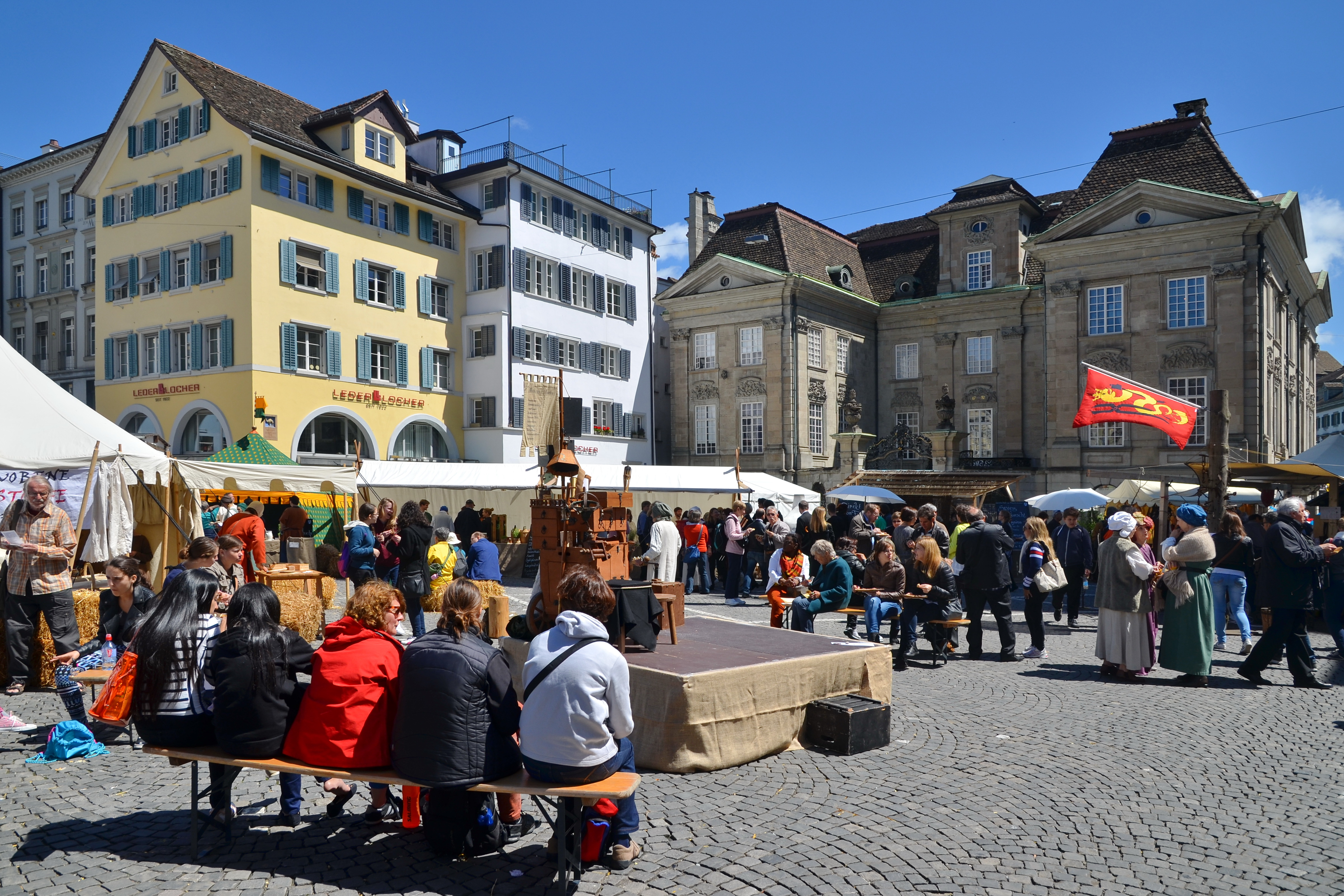
Spectaculum at the Münsterhof square in May 2014

== History of Gesellschaft zu Fraumünster ==
In medieval times, in Zürich all female and male Bürger were members of the guilds, but beginning in the 19th century women were no more tolerated within the guilds then more as decoration of their men being still members of the guilds of Zürich. The history of the Gesellschaft zu Fraumünsters dates back to the late 9th century when the abbess of the Fraumünster Abbey (853 A.D.) in fact reigned the city of Zürich as Fürstäbtissin (imperial abbess) nominated by the king of the Holy Roman Empire, among them Katharina von Zimmern. Gesellschaft zu Fraumünster, being the society of the former noble women of the Fraumünster Abbey, was established in 1989. Now, the honorable women of the society cultivate the virtuous habits of the former abbey by p.e. honoring the work of engaged women in the modern society. Beginning fifteen years ago, the society started to organize every three years the so-called Mittelalter Spectaculum, a medieval funfair, at the Münsterhof square.

== Sechseläuten and the guilds of Zürich ==
Since 2010 the guilds of Zürich allow to the women of the society to practice Sechseläuten, as guests of the Constaffel society, for historical reasons as until 1524 AD the abbesses of the Fraumünster abbey were members of the Constaffel.

As of November 2014, expressly agreed by the guilds of Zürich, the Fraumünster society – still as guest, not as an official member – may practice Sechseläuten provisorily until 2022, as also confirmed by the association (Zentralkomitee der Zünfte) of the Zürich guilds. Mrs Regula Zweifel, representative of the Fraumünster society, told in an interview on 6 November 2014, ″... after 25 years, the tug of war is finally over. The fact that we now have guest status at Sechseläutenplatz, is great. But it is only a first step ...″ The association of guild members will, on occasion of an official ceremony, sign an agreement between the Fraumünster society and the so-called Zunftmeister's (literally: masters of the guilds) in December 2014: as long as the agreement applies, the Fraumünster society may participate namely the Sechseläuten procession and Böögg burning, but neither do any steps to join the assembly of the Zürich guilds nor participate other activities related to Sechseläuten.

== Activities ==
The association organizes monthly meetings, and its members are involved in numerous cultural projects, among them the honor book for women, a silent memorial to all women who do extraordinary things in everyday life and shape society actively. Every three years the "Mittelalter Spectaculum" at the Münsterhof plaza is organized. Each year, the society honors posthumously female personalities with a plaque at their site of action in Zürich, and publishes a New Year's sheet.

== Notable women awarded by the association ==
The Fraumünster society posthumously honors women who have provided outstanding professional services or social innovations in Zürich. The honoring take place on the morning of the Sechseläuten festival and are public. Whenever possible, a plaque is attached to a former residence or place of activity of the honored women.

Name	EN-WP wiki	born	died	honor	remarks	location
Bullinger, Anna	Anna Bullinger-Adlischwyler	1500 (around)	1564	2017	Former nun of the Oetenbach Nunnery who married Heinrich Bullinger after the Reformation in Zürich	Zwingliplatz 4 (Carolinum Zürich)
Escher, Mathilde	Mathilde Escher	1808	1875	2015	Founded the Mathilde-Escher foundation in Zürich	St. Annagasse 11
Fierz, Maria	Maria Fierz	1878	1956	2016	Funding of the internal cohesion of the urban population	
Lieberherr, Emilie	Emilie Lieberherr	1924	2011	2014	First women member of the Council of States (Switzerland) and first women city councillor in Zürich	in progress
Gutknecht, Rosa	Rosa Gutknecht	1885	1959	2013	Theologician and assistant pastor at the Grossmünster church	Zwingliplatz 1
Feller, Elisabeth	Elisabeth Feller	1910	1973	2012	Independent entrepreneur, feminist and patron of the arts	Stockerstrasse 9
Birch-Pfeiffer, Charlotte	Charlotte Birch-Pfeiffer	1800	1868	2011	First women theatre director (1837–1843) in Switzerland	Schauspielhaus, Heimplatz
Heim-Vögtlin, Marie	Marie Heim-Vögtlin	1845	1916	2010	First female Swiss physician, a writer and a co-founder of the first Swiss gynaecological hospital.	Hottingerstrasse 25
Wetzikon, Elisabeth von	Elisabeth von Wetzikon	1235	1298	2009	Abbess of the Fraumünster nunnery, supporter of the Codex Manesse	
Welti-Escher, Lydia	Lydia Welti-Escher	1858	1891	2008	Patron of the arts and founder of the Gottfried Keller Stiftung.	Kunsthaus Zürich, Lydia-Welti-Escher-Hof
Zumsteg, Hulda	Hulda Zumsteg	1890	1984	2007	Prominent hostess of the Kronenhalle restaurant in Zürich	not allowed to apply
Schaufelberger, Barbara	Barbara Schaufelberger	1645	1718	2006	First women book printer and publisher in Switzerland	Storchengasse 19
Marić-Einstein, Mileva	Mileva Marić-Einstein	1875	1948	2005	Serbian physicist, Albert Einstein's fellow student at the Zurich Polytechnic, and later his first wife.	Huttenstrasse 62
Kempin-Spyri, Emilie	Emilie Kempin-Spyri	1853	1901	2004	First woman in Switzerland to graduate with a law degree and to be accepted as an academic lecturer.	University of Zürich, Rämistrasse 74
Wyss, Laure	Laure Wyss	1913	2002	2003	Swiss writer and journalist, correspondent and activist	Winkelwiese 6
Burghalden, Hedwig ab	Hedwig ab Burghalden	??	??	2002	Maybe fictitious, deviously defeated Austrian troops in 1292 AD.	Fountain at Lindenhof hill
Heinzelmann, Gertrud	Gertrud Heinzelmann	1914	1999	2001	Lawyer and initiator of the women's movement for voting rights	Münzplatz 3
Zimmern, Kathaina von	Katharina von Zimmern	1478	1547	2000	Last abbess of the Fraumünster Abbey	Neumarkt 13, Fraumünster cloister
Reinhart-Zwingli, Anna	Anna Reinhart	1484	1538	1999	Wife of Huldrych Zwingli	Schifflände 30
Waser, Anna	Anna Waser	1678	1714	1998	Swiss engraver and miniature painter	Münstergasse 19
Guyer, Lux	Lux Guyer	1894	1955	1997	First woman architect with her own office in Switzerland and project manager of SAFFA 1928.	Bahnhofstr. 71
