= Sémiramis (tragedy) =

Tragedy by Voltaire

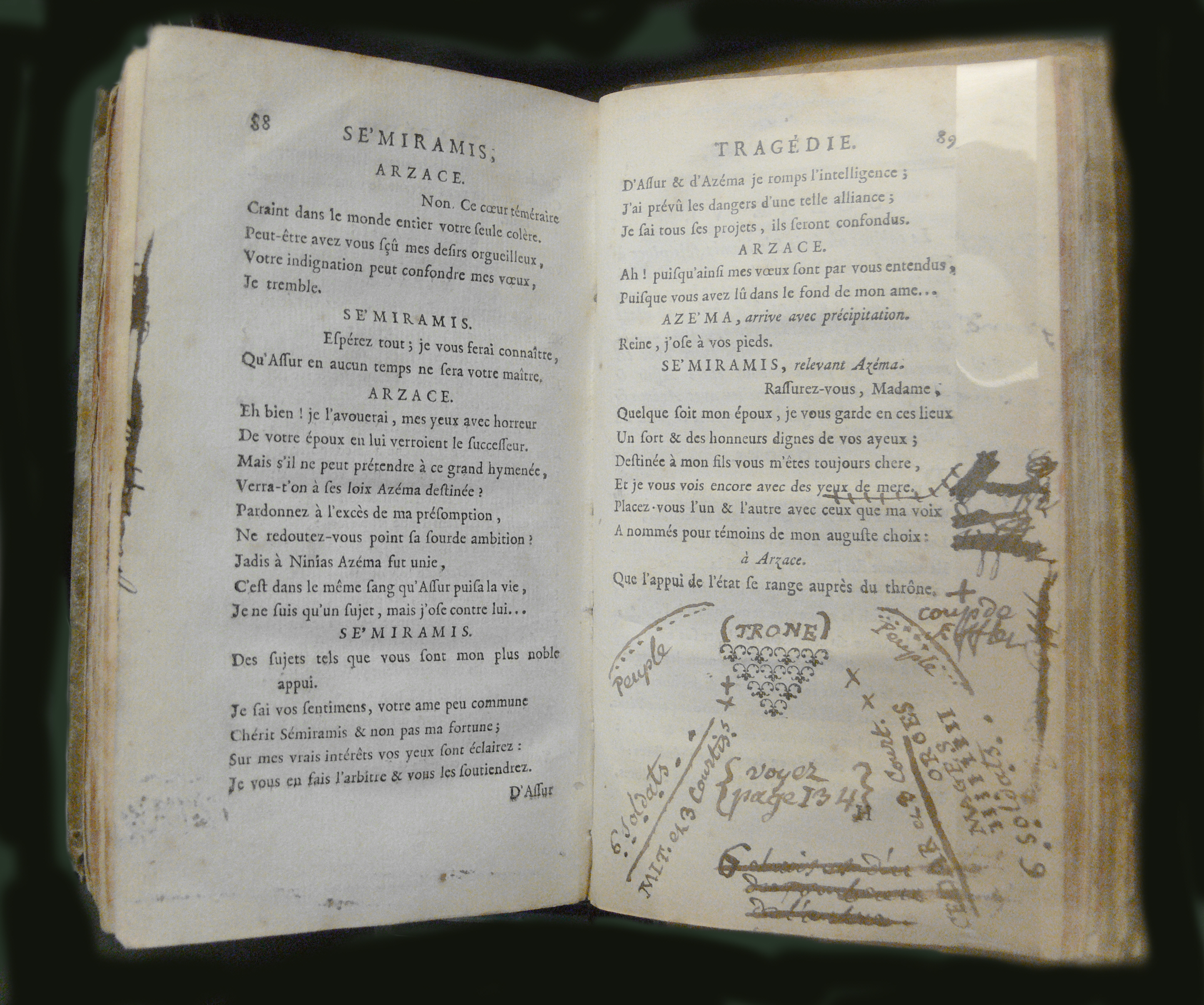
Director’s copy for a performance of Sémiramis, Mannheim, around 1749

Sémiramis (1746) is a tragedy in five acts by Voltaire, first performed in 1748 and published in 1749.

== Action ==
=== Act 1 ===
The plot is very similar to that of Voltaire's earlier unsuccessful tragedy Ériphyle. The action takes place in a courtyard in front of the palace of Semiramis in Babylon, in front of the Hanging Gardens. Sémiramis, after having her husband Ninus poisoned, now rules the Babylonian Empire. Ninus had previously given his son Ninias to the old man Phradate. The son grew up as Arsace in Scythia and returns to Babylon 15 years after the murder. At his father's coffin he hears his voice demanding revenge. – Sémiramis has been plagued by Ninus’ ghost for months.

=== Act 2 ===
The queen hates Assur - he in turn wants to be king and rule together with Azéma as his wife. In order to find out the will of the gods, Sémiramis obtained an oracle: a second wedding should calm Ninus in his grave. In a confidential conversation she reveals to Assur her intention to share the royal rule with him.

=== Act 3 ===
Sémiramis sees that the gods have brought Arsace to her for a new marriage and decides to marry him instead of Assur. She announces the decision that the gods who watch over the empire have made: Arsace is the new monarch. Ninus's shadow rises from the grave and tells Arsace that he will rule but must atone for atrocities.

=== Act 4 ===
The Grand Priest reveals to Arsace that he is Ninias, Ninus' son - Sémiramis herself took her husband's life, and Assur gave the poison. A document written by the dying man proves the queen's guilt. Arsace shows the document to his mother, who then pleads guilty.

=== Act 5 ===
Assur wants to eliminate his rival Arsace in the mausoleum. Sémiramis comes to save the son, but is fatally injured by him in the scuffle. Arsace/Ninias involuntarily avenged his father's death on his mother. The Grand Priest sums up: “Tremble, you kings on the throne and fear the justice of the gods.”

== Dispute with Crébillon ==
When Voltaire was given the opportunity to write a piece of grand theatre to commemorate the birth of the dauphin’s first son in 1746, he selected the apparently inappropriate story of the ancient queen Semiramis. The theme of a ruler who poisoned her husband, fell in love with her own son and ultimately met her death was not one that appeared to have the expected celebratory qualities. Voltaire claimed that the play would restore French tragedy to its classical glory, an aspiration worthy of a new prince. In the event the birth went badly and the young dauphine Maria Teresa died. The play was therefore not performed at court or in the public theatre, but Voltaire sent a copy to Frederick the Great in February 1747.

Sémiramis became a focal point for the bitter dispute between Voltaire and his older rival Prosper Jolyot de Crébillon. Crébillon was favoured by Madame de Pompadour, who secured him the position of royal librarian and gave him a pension. Crébillon was also the royal censor, and had previously irritated Voltaire by demanding changes in Temple du goût (1733) and then stopped the performances of Mahomet (1742) and La Mort de César (1743). Voltaire decided to retaliate by selecting, one after another, classical themes for his tragedies which Crébillon had used earlier, to demonstrate the superiority of his own treatment of the material. The first of these plays, Sémiramis, dealt with a plot Crébillon had used in his tragedy of the same name in 1717. He followed this up with Oreste (1750) and Rome sauvée (1752).

Crébillon was angry with Voltaire's choice of Sémiramis. He first required a number of irritating changes from Voltaire, and then immediately authorised the publication of a parody of the play - not uncommon at the time - which was performed at the Comédie Italienne and then for the court at Fontainebleau, and which Voltaire felt singled him out for ridicule.

The staging of the play became another battleground between the followers of Crébillon and partisans of Voltaire. Traditionally part of the stage in the Comédie-Française was occupied by gentlemen spectators, and Crébillon supported this status quo. However Voltaire wanted grand and lavish sets, and the theatrical effect of a ghost would be lost if there were spectators sitting close to where he appeared. He therefore insisted on clearing the stage.

== Critical reception ==
The play was first performed at the court of Stanisław Leszczyński in Lunéville, but its public premiere was on August 29, 1748 at the Comédie-Française. It became one of Voltaire's greatest stage successes, not only in France but internationally, as it was performed in many European capitals. St. Petersburg was an exception, as Catherine the Great found the theme of a queen murdering her husband uncongenial. Voltaire's text was the basis for the libretto by Gaetano Rossi used by Gioachino Rossini for his opera Semiramide. An English translation of the play was printed in 1760, and adaptations of it were staged at the Theatre Royal, Drury Lane in 1776 and the King's Theatre, Haymarket in 1794.

== Printed editions ==
In 1749 a version of the play, printed by Lambert, appeared without naming the author. Three other unauthorized printings followed in the same year. Voltaire added a treatise on ancient and modern tragedy as a preface and an appendix in honour of the dead officers of the War of Austrian Succession.
