= Charles Eschard =

French painter, draftsman and engraver (1748–1810)

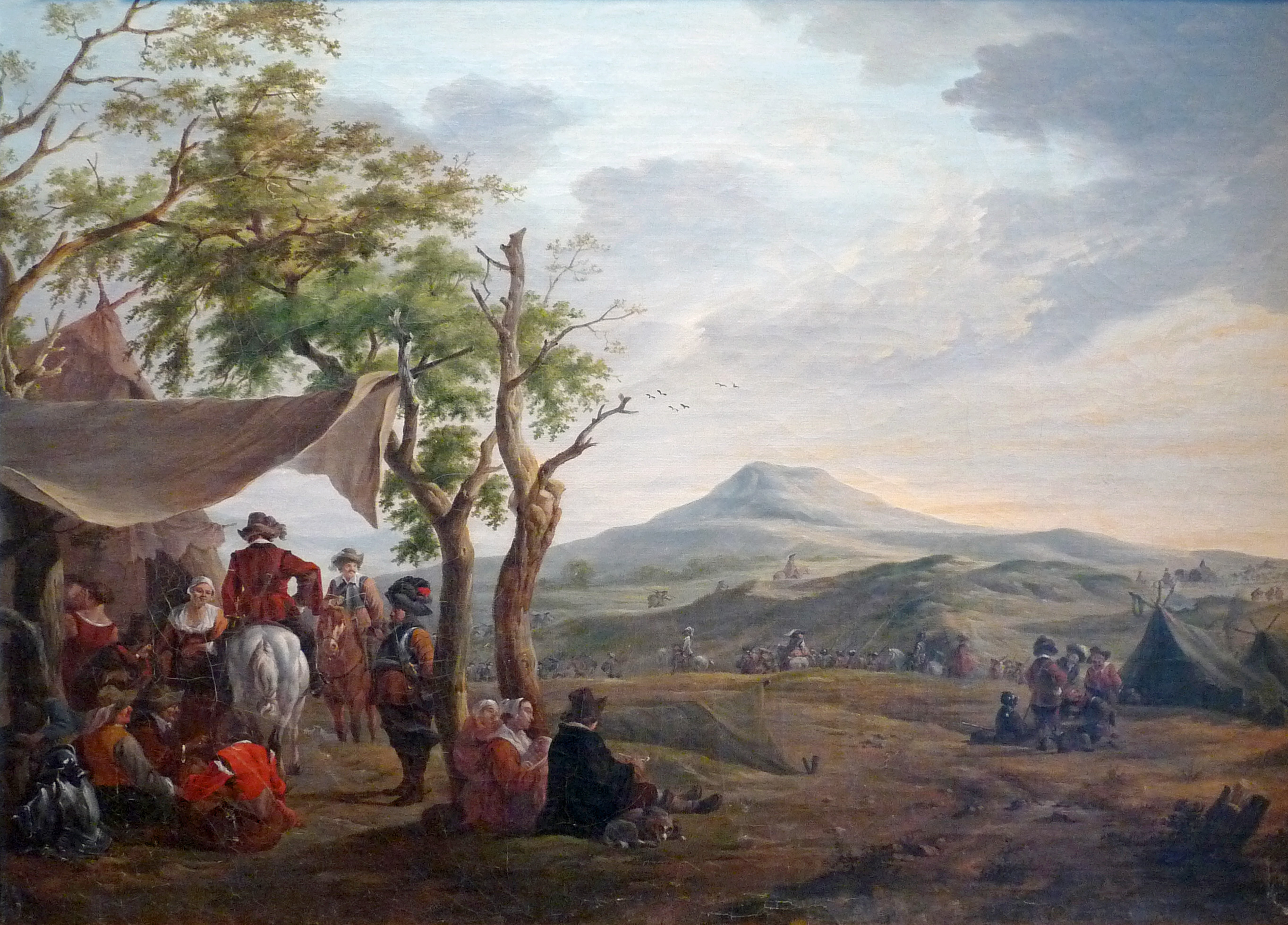
Military Camp by Charles Eschard, Musée barrois (Bar-le-Duc)

Charles Eschard (1748 - 1810) was a French painter, draftsman and engraver.

Eschard began his art training at the Rouen Academy of Arts directed by Jean-Baptiste Descamps. He then went to spend a few years in Holland, where he studied the masterpieces of Flemish masters.

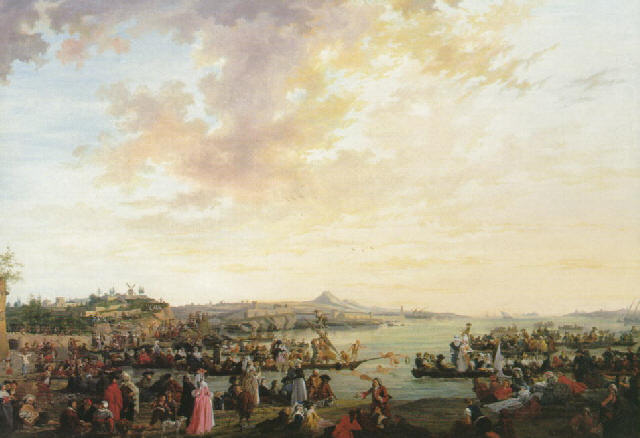
View of Marseille: Joust and party on the water by Charles Eschard, private collection, 1791

Back in France, he exhibited at The Louvre View of Marseille: Joust and party on the water, and A view of the port of Harlem. In 1798 he again exhibited A view of Mont Blanc and A view of Holland around Groningen. Another picture of the same kind, A view of the channel extending around Holland, was given by the author to the Museum of Rouen. It was approved by the Royal Academy of Painting and Sculpture in 1783.

Charles Eschard, who according to some experts used soft brushstrokes and pleasant colors, also engraved etchings of a number of highly sought after subjects. His key prints were The Shepherds, The Beggars, and The Fisherman.
