= Gertrud Heinzelmann =

Swiss feminist and suffragist

Gertrud Heinzelmann (17 June 1914 – 4 September 1999) was a Swiss feminist and suffragist. She was a leading figure in the Swiss women's suffrage movement and campaigned for women to be admitted on equal terms to men in the Roman Catholic Church.

== Biography ==
Heinzelemann was born in 1914 in Wohlen, Aargau, Switzerland .

She studied law and politics at Zürich University, because, as a woman, she was unable to study theology. Her thesis was titled “The basic relationship between Church and State in the Concordats." She became a lawyer and was an active member of the feminist Catholic organization St. Joan's International Alliance.

Heinzelemann and Josefa Theresia Münch campaigned for complete equality for women in the Roman Catholic church. On the eve of the Second Vatican Council, in May 1962, Heinzelemann sent the pamphlet We Won't Keep Silent Any Longer: Women Speak Out to Vatican Council to the Conciliar Preparatory Commission, outlining why women in the Roman Catholic Church should have full equality of access to the diaconate and priesthood. She publicly challenged the Vatican's discriminatory policies and also felt that courageous bishops should start to ordain women in order to establish a succession. Her views sparked a worldwide debate and she was criticised by both Swiss and international conservatives.

Heinzelmann was also a member of the women suffrage union Schweizerischen Verbandes für Frauenrechte, and served as its president in 1959–1960. She founded the publishing house Interfeminas in 1964 in Bonstetten, Zurich, which was the first publishing house in the German-speaking world dedicated to publications on women's rights.

Heinzelmann was awarded the Binet-Fendt Prize in 1981 and the Ida Somazzi Prize in 1992.

== Publications ==
Heinzelmann's publications include a deconstruction of Thomas Aquinas's reading of the Book of Genesis 1-3.

Her works:

- Das grundsätzl. Verhältnis von Kirche und Staat in den Konkordaten, 1943
- Wir schweigen nicht länger!, 1964
- Die geheiligte Diskriminierung, 1986

== Death and legacy ==
Heinzelmann died in 1999, in Benglen, Fällanden, Switzerland.

In 2001, Heinzelmann's work was honoured by the Gesellschaft zu Fraumünster.
