= Jean-Jacques Le Veau =

French engraver

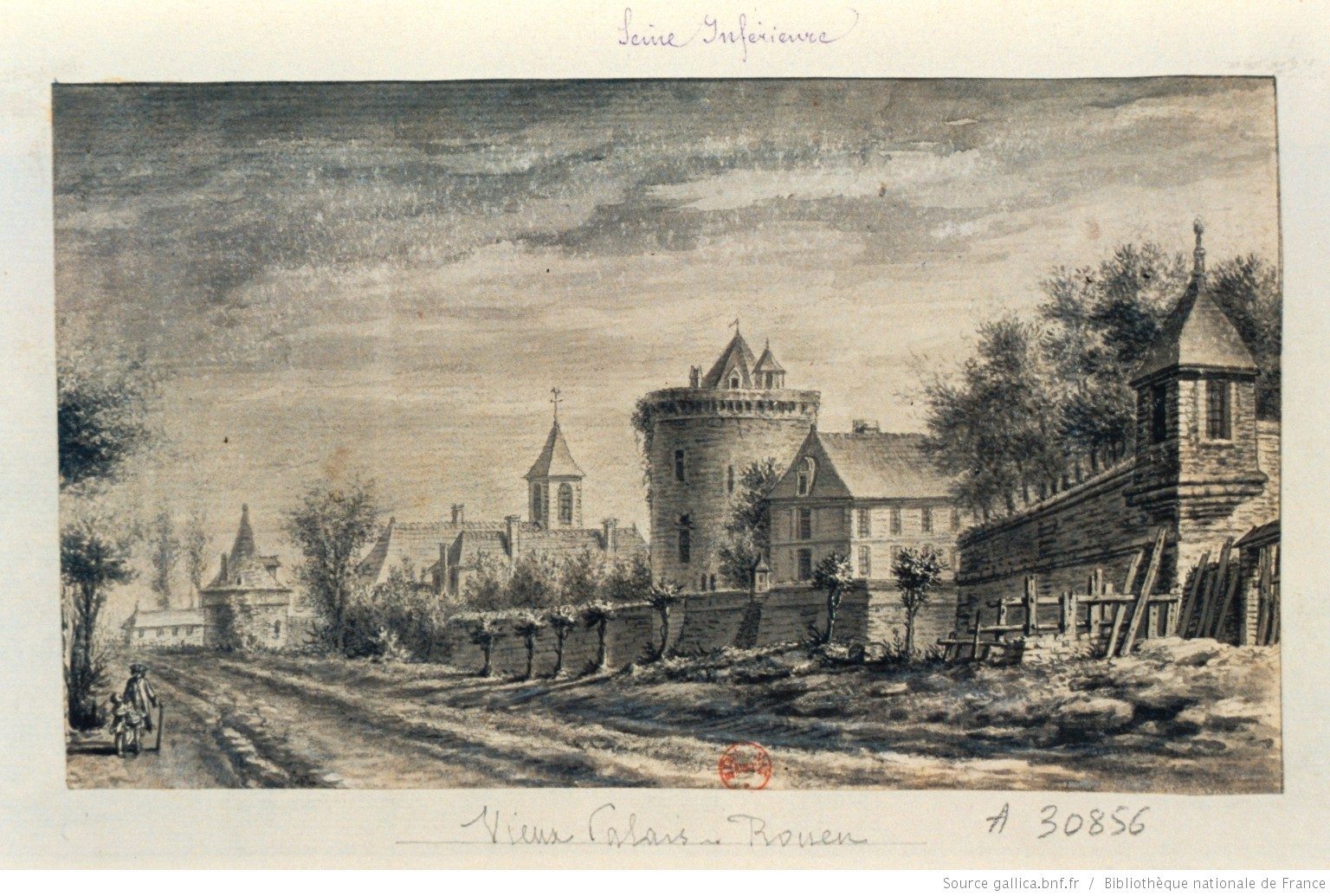
The Old Palace of Rouen

Jean-Jacques André Le Veau (9 January 1729, Rouen – April 1786, Paris) was a French engraver and designer.

== Biography ==
He was born to Jean-Jacques Le Veau, a poor shoemaker, and his wife Marie-Marthe, née Catelin. In poor health, and too much of a burden for his parents, he was entrusted to the care of the nuns of charity at the Hospice de la Madeleine. His artistic talents developed early, and were noted by the nuns.

In 1744, he was apprenticed to a maker of passementerie. Two years later, he became a student of Jean-Baptiste Descamps at the free drawing school. In 1748, this was followed by an apprenticeship with a silver engraver. At the same time, thanks to Descamps, he was able to serve as a drawing tutor for young girls from "good families". He was able to do this, despite still being in ill-health which, by then, had been diagnosed as scrofula. Surgery, and a convalescence at the Madeleine Hospice provided some relief.

His first professional engravings, supervised by Descamps, date from this period. Notably, a portrait of Philippe de Champaigne, after Gérard Edelinck. The drawing school awarded him a prize for his work in 1750.

After that, he obtained a position in the workshops of Jacques-Philippe Le Bas, again thanks to the influence of Descamps. His move from Rouen to Paris was financially supported by the families of his students, including Antoine Le Couteulx de Verclives, alderman and future Mayor of Rouen. He would stay with Le Bas for four years, although he was offered 600 Livres a year to stay longer. A brief return to Rouen marked the true beginning of his personal career, when he created four engravings of local landscape scenes, signed with his name.

Upon returning to Paris, he published and sold his engravings, and assisted others with producing their plates. In 1765, he married Marie-Geneviève Deny, the sister of his former students Martial and Jeanne Deny. They had three children. Their eldest, Victoire, would also become an engraver. In 1775, he was admitted to the Académie des Sciences, Belles-lettres et Arts in Rouen.

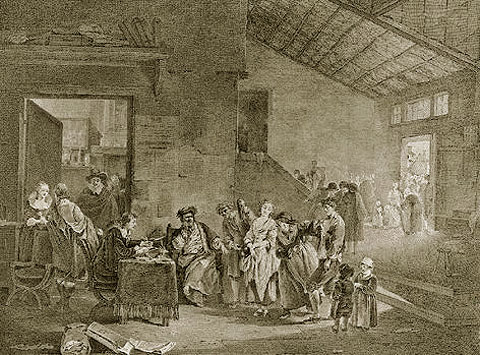
"The Judge", or "The Broken Jug" (after Philibert-Louis Debucourt)

He was a hard worker, day and night, and most likely died from exhaustion. He was apparently buried in a mass grave at the church of Saint-Benoît-le-Bétourné, which was demolished in 1831 to make room for the Théâtre du Panthéon.
