= History of Charles XII =

French work of Swedish history published in 1731

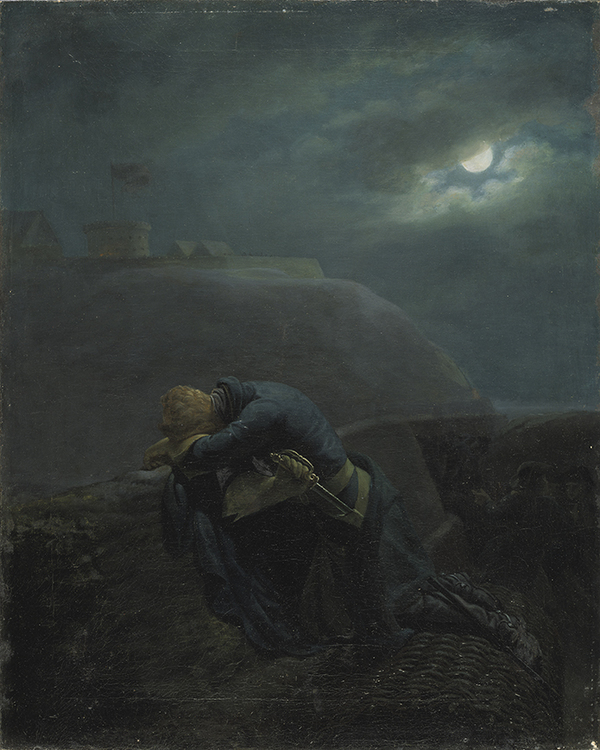
- The death of Charles XII of Sweden as shown in Voltaire's book
- Author: Voltaire
- Original title: Histoire de Charles XII
- Language: French
- Subject: History of Sweden, Charles XII
- Genre: History, Historiography
- Publication date: 1731
- Publication place: France

History of Charles XII (French: Histoire de Charles XII) is a biography by the French historian, philosopher, and writer Voltaire, about King Charles XII of Sweden. The book was Voltaire's first major work of history when it was published in 1731.

Voltaire's biography follows in the then-contempary trend of comparing Charles with major figures from antiquity, such as Alexander the Great. However, Voltaire ultimately concludes that Charles had a worse reign compared to that of his main adversary Peter the Great, due to Charles's singular focus on warfare while Peter had long lasting achievements outside of the battlefield.
