= Jean-Michel Moreau =

French draughtsman, illustrator and engraver

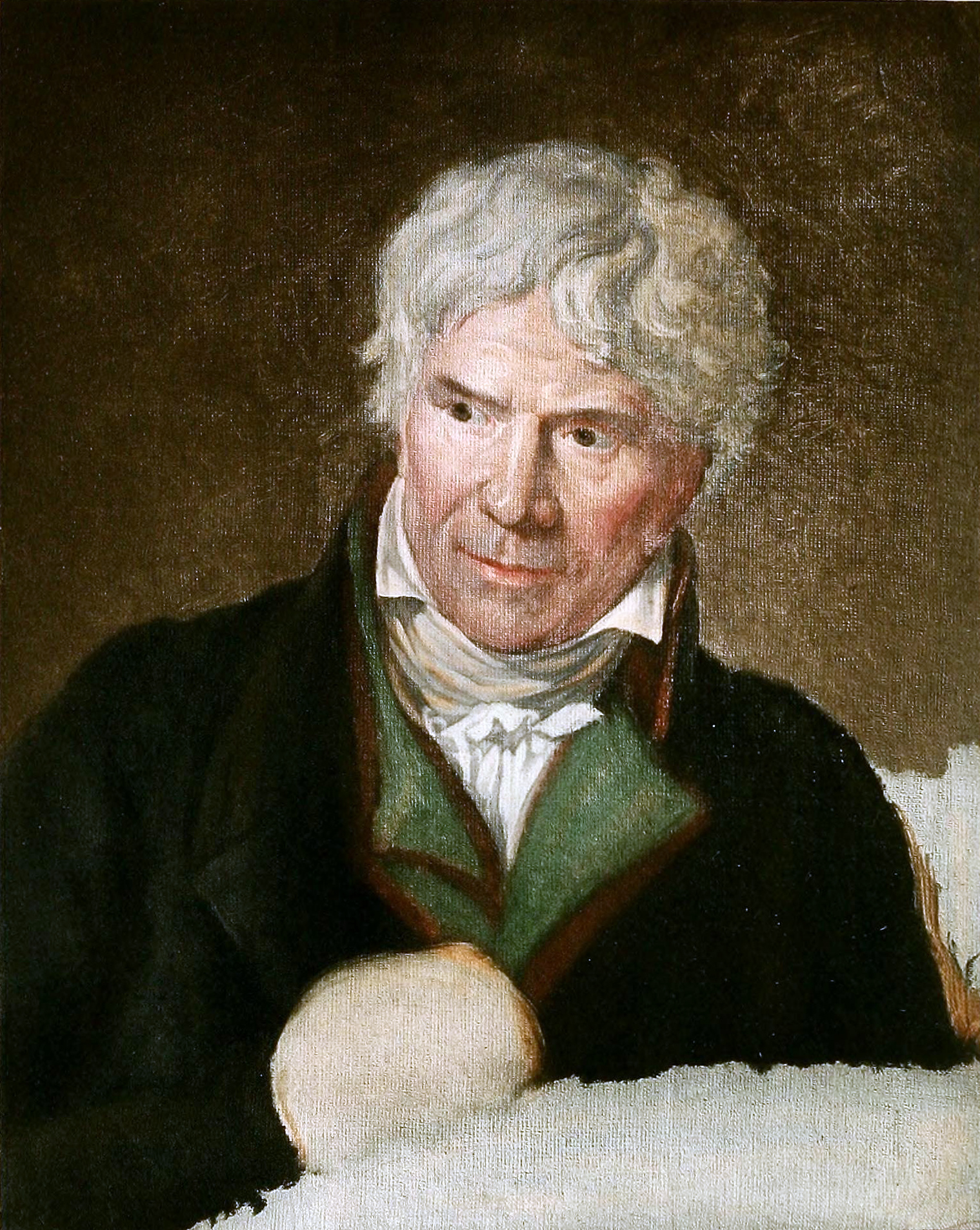
Portrait of Jean-Michel Moreau le Jeune by François-Louis Gounod

Jean-Michel Moreau (French: [ʒɑ̃ miʃɛl mɔʁo]; 26 March 1741 – 30 November 1814), also called Moreau le Jeune ("the younger"), was a French draughtsman, illustrator and engraver.

== Biography ==
Moreau le Jeune, as he is usually called, was born in Paris. He was the pupil of the painter Louis-Joseph Le Lorrain who accompanied his master to St Petersburg in 1758 when Le Lorrain went to be the first director of the Saint Petersburg Academy of Fine Arts established the previous year, where Moreau briefly taught drawing before returning to Paris in 1759, after Le Lorrain's unexpected death.

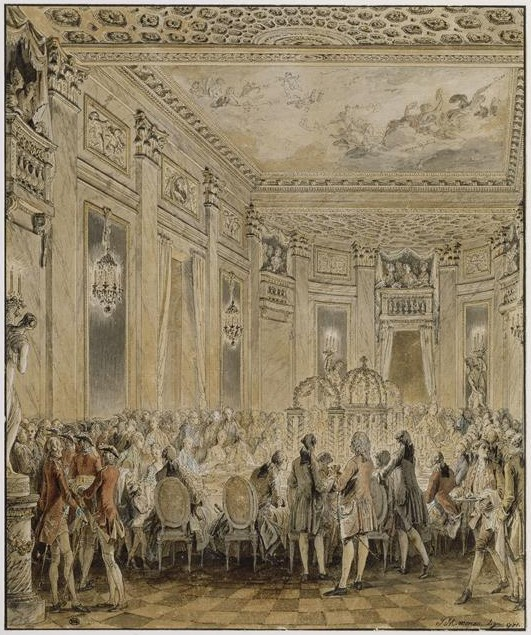
Jean-Michel Moreau the Younger, Fête donnée à Louveciennes le 2 septembre 1771 (Musée du Louvre)

He worked for the engraver Jacques-Philippe Lebas, producing reproductive drawings of contemporary paintings and those of Old Masters for engravers to work from and learning etching During the 1760s he also provided drawings to be engraved for the Recueil d’antiquités of the comte de Caylus, who kept a benevolent watch over him. For Diderot and Alembert's Encyclopédie he provided pen and wash drawings for the engravers, illustrating artisanal processes. As an engraver he collaborated with François Boucher, Hubert Gravelot and others on illustrations for an edition of Ovid's Metamorphoses.

In 1765 Moreau married Françoise-Nicole Pineau, daughter of François Pineau, master sculptor, and Jeanne-Marie Prault - whose father was Pierre Prault, patriarch of a family of publishers, privilègiés du Roi.

In 1770 he succeeded Charles-Nicolas Cochin as chief Dessinateur des Menus Plaisirs du Roi, on Cochin's recommendation, which occasioned his prints celebrating the marriage of the Dauphin and his coronation in 1781, in part on the strength of these productions he was appointed Dessinateur et Graveur du Cabinet du Roi, which brought an annual pension and lodgings in the galleries of the Palais du Louvre. Now he found that he required the services of other engravers to reproduce his own designs, which included illustrations for the Chansons of Jean-Benjamin de La Borde (1773), the collected works of Rousseau (1773–82) and of Voltaire (printed at Brussels, 1782–9). For the Menus Plaisirs, the office that produced and executed all the designs for settings of court festivities and recorded them in presentation drawings, he recorded many occasions such as his famous pen-and-wash record of the inauguration in September 1771 of Mme du Barry's Pavillon de Louveciennes (illustration, right). He still found time for intimate portrait drawings in charcoal and chalks

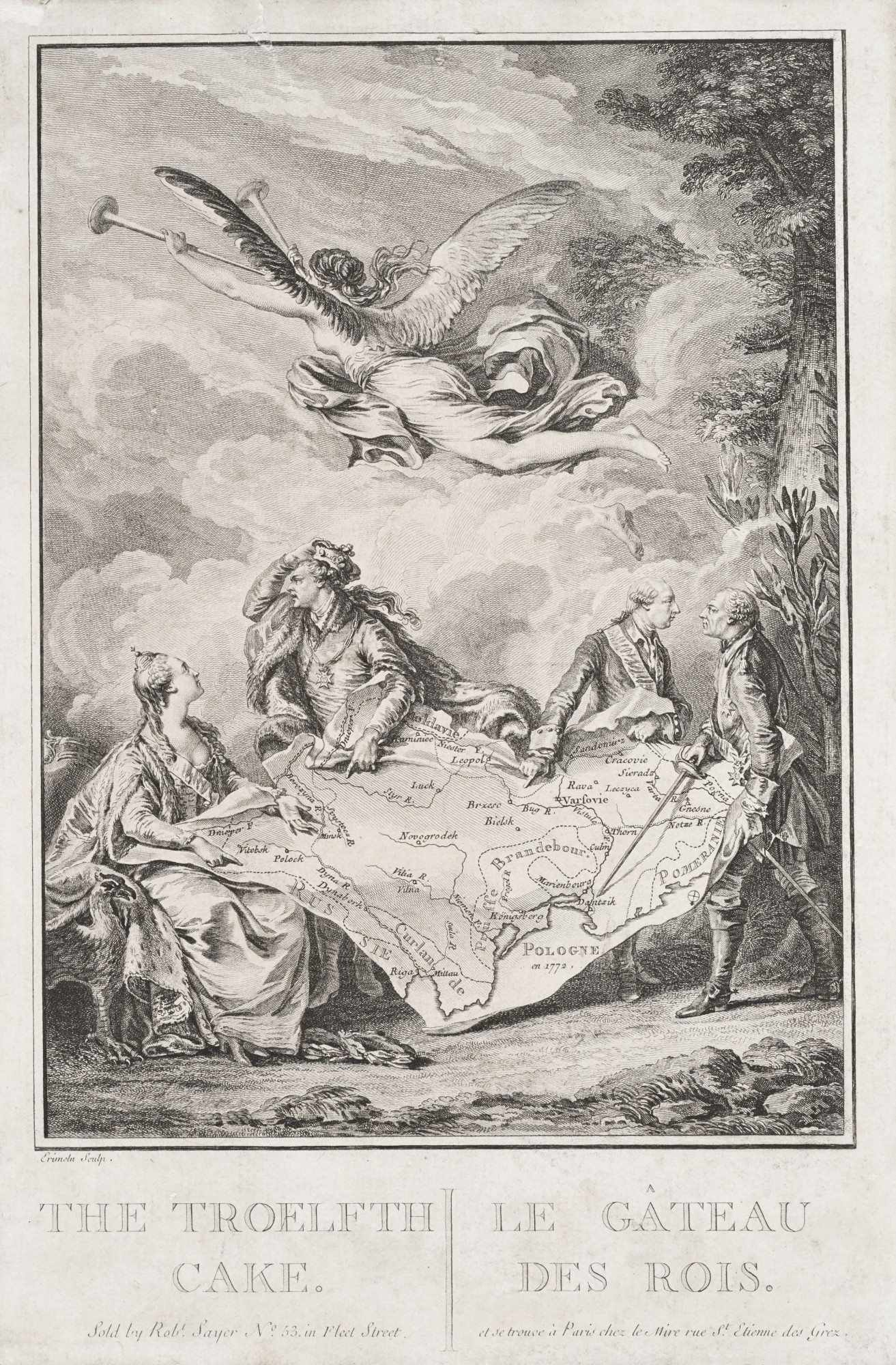
Noël Le Mire from Jean-Michel Moreau the Younger, Le gâteau des rois (The Troelfth Cake), an allegory of the First Partition of Poland

Moreau's name appears in the 1778 roster of Les Neuf Soeurs, the masonic lodge named for the Muses that had been founded two years previously by the astronomer Jérôme Lalande, and which served as a forum for progressive ideas.

He traveled to Italy for six months in 1785 and wasagrée at the Académie Royale de Peinture et de Sculpture in 1780 and received there as a full member in 1789. The French Revolution, with which Moreau was in sympathy, did not hinder his success as an illustrator, providing engravers with pen and wash drawings to replicate, as for a French translation of the Aeneid published in 1804 In 1793 Moreau was appointed to the commission temporaire des arts and in 1797 was made a professor at the newly reformed écoles centrales. With the Bourbon restoration in 1814 Louis XVIII appointed him once again to a royal office. He died in Paris.

In his prolific career his best-known works are those twenty-four illustrations that record fashionable dress and interiors of the last years of the Ancien Régime, his contributions to the Monument du costume physique et morale, twelve as a Suite d'estampes pour servir à l'histoire dews mœurs des François au dix-huitième siècle, 1776 and 1777, and twelve more in the Troisième Suite d'éstampes pour servir a l'Histoire des Moeurs et du Costume..., 1783, published by his uncle by marriage, L.-F. Prault, and many times re-issued in varying formats, notably in a collection in 1789 with text by Restif de la Bretonne. Each of the first dozen of these vignettes of stylish contemporary life has an element of anecdote, reporting in a cohesive and unified manner "a highly idealized vision of an aristocratic family's approach to childbearing and motherhood based on the philosophy of Rousseau" (Heller-Greenman). In the second suite, a hint of criticism of aristocratic duplicity in affairs of the heart can be discerned and some rural vignettes vertueuses (sentimental and virtuous) provide a contrasting social world in the manner of Greuze.

Moreau le Jeune's reputation was resuscitated from oblivion in the later nineteenth century by the connoisseurs of the dix-huitième Edmond and Jules de Goncourt.
