= The Troelfth Cake =

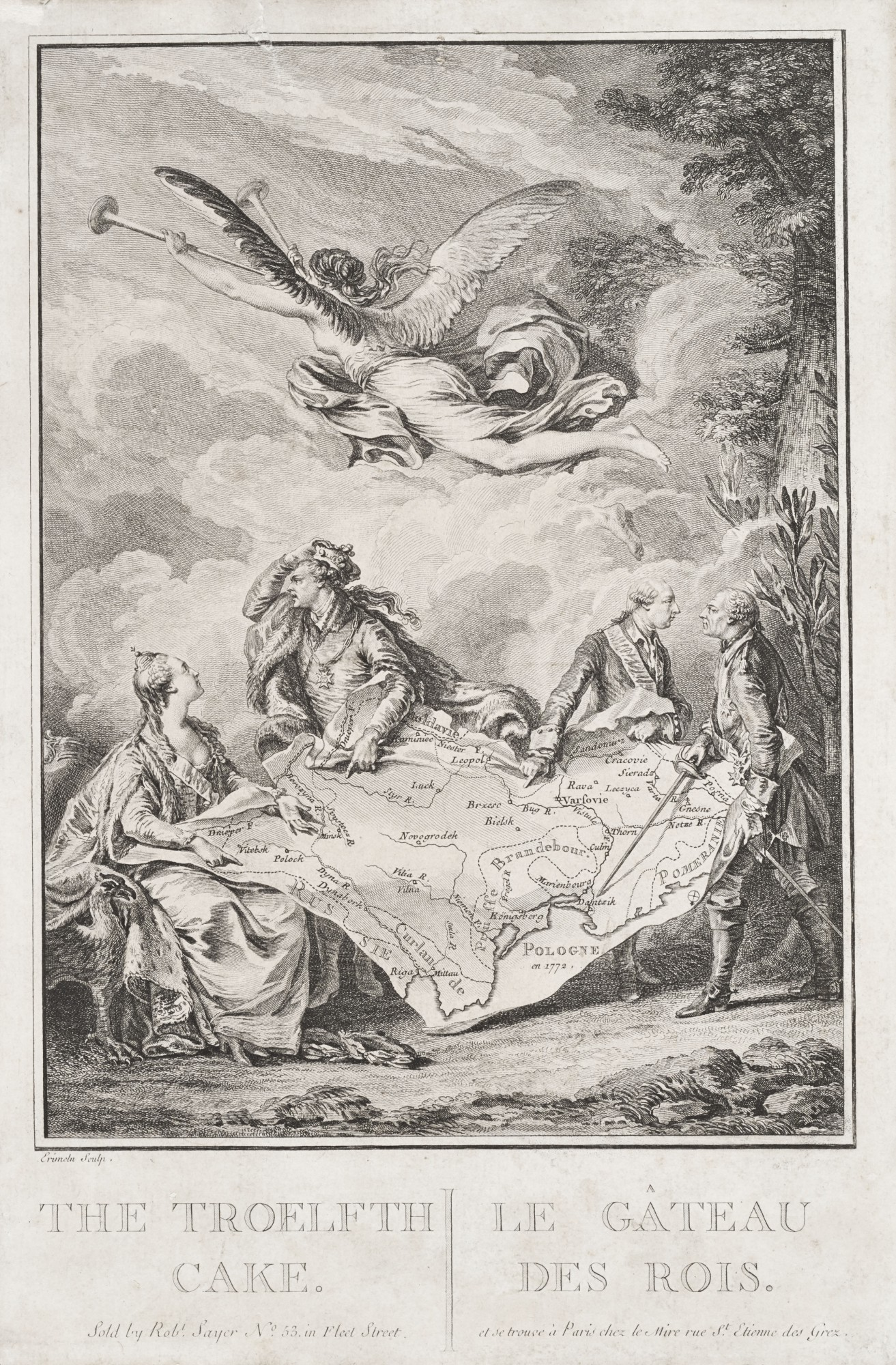
The Troelfth Cake. French original. Black and white engraving

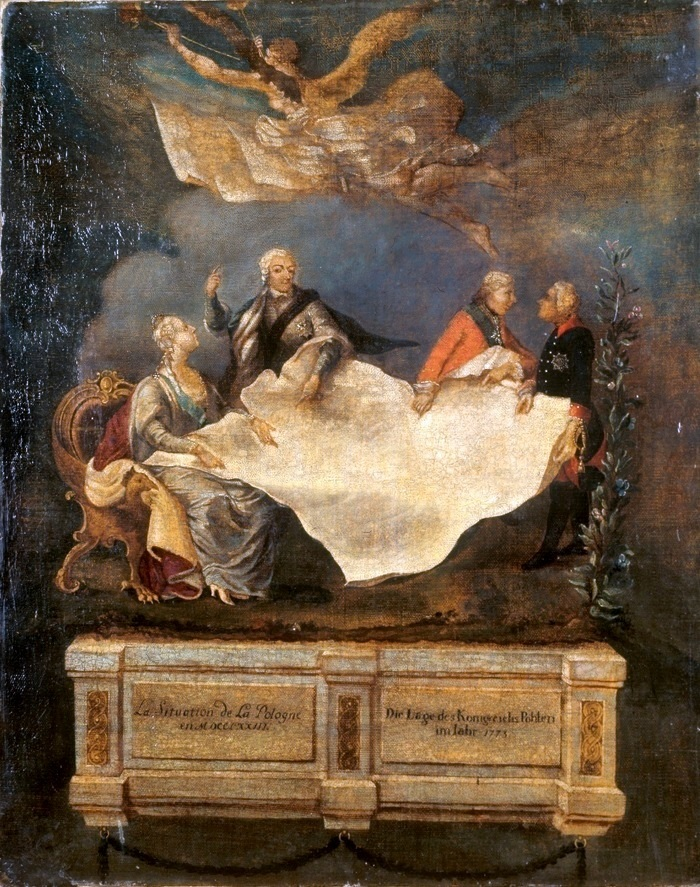
The Troelfth Cake, German version, in color

The Troelfth Cake (also The Twelfth Cake, The Royal Cake, The Cake of Kings, from the French: Le gâteau des rois, Polish: Kołacz królewski, Placek królewski) is a 1773 French allegory and satire on the First Partition of Poland. It is likely that the original title in English was intended to say "The Twelfth Cake", alluding to the division of a three kings cake (also called a Twelfth Cake), but this became corrupted in later reprints. There are at least four variants of the composition, which is most common as an engraving, but also as at least one color painting; the original was likely drawn by Jean-Michel Moreau le Jeune and engraved by Noël Le Mire (although another source calls them merely the authors of the most famous variant). Authors of other variants included the German artist Johannes Esaias Nilson.

The Troelfth Cake shows the rulers of the three countries that participated in the partition tearing a map of the Polish–Lithuanian Commonwealth apart. The outer figures demanding their share are Catherine II of Russia and Frederick II of Prussia. Catherine is glaring at her former lover, the Polish king Stanisław August Poniatowski, and (in some variants of the engraving) Frederick is pointing to Danzig (Gdańsk) with a sword (although Prussia acquired the territories around it, Gdańsk still remained with the Commonwealth). The inner figure on the right is the Habsburg Emperor Joseph II. On his left is the beleaguered Stanisław August Poniatowski, who (in some variants of the engraving) is experiencing difficulty keeping his crown on his head, and in another, has already lost it. Above the scene is Pheme (personification of fame, with manifestos from the partitioning powers in the German variant).

The composition gained notoriety in contemporary Europe; its distribution was banned in several European countries, including France. This ban, and associated penalties, meant that many variants of this work have been anonymous.

The image was highly influential on numerous other satirical works of its time.

The changes between the French original and the German version, both portrayed here, were done to reduce the sexual content of the satire (the look between the lovers, the phallic sword).
