= Noël Le Mire =

French designer, engraver and etcher

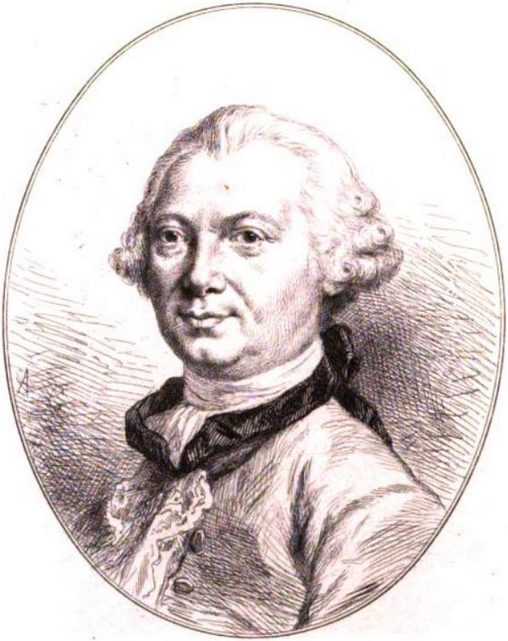
Noël Le Mire, from a miniature portrait by an unknown artist

Noël Le Mire (20 November 1724, Rouen - 21 March 1801, Paris) was a French designer, engraver and etcher.

== Biography ==
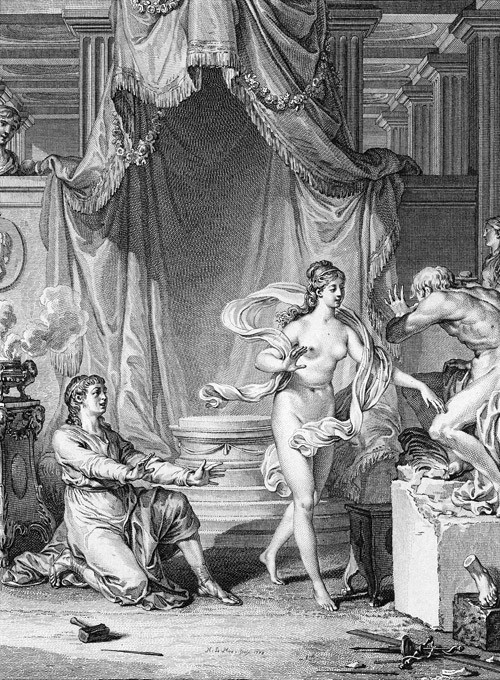
"Pygmalion", from Metamorphoses; after Jean-Michel Moreau

He was the eldest of thirteen children born to Noël Le Mire, a bargeman and timber merchant, and his wife Anne-Marguerite née Mancel. His younger brother, Jean (1725-1791), became a Knight in the Order of Saint Louis for his participation in the defense of Québec during the Revolutionary War.

From 1740, he studied at the new free drawing school, directed by Jean-Baptiste Descamps. He was awarded several prizes before moving to Paris, sometime between 1745 and 1750, where he was employed in the workshop of Jacques-Philippe Le Bas. In a letter to the Swedish engraver, Jean Eric Rehn (1751), Le Bas described Le Mire as one of his best employees. He was especially adept at creating vignettes. Notable examples include special editions of the Fables of Jean de La Fontaine (based on the drawings of Jean-Baptiste Oudry), and the Metamorphoses of Ovid. He also illustrated works by Boccaccio, Corneille, Racine, Voltaire and Rousseau.

His small engraved portraits of royalty were very popular. These included Henry IV, Frederick the Great, Joseph II and Louis XV. Other notable engravings featured mythological scenes (Jupiter and Danaë), historical scenes (the death of Lucretia), and landscapes (Mount Vesuvius).

One of his large engravings, The Partition of Poland, or the Cake of the Kings, was barely completed when it was ordered to be destroyed. Antoine de Sartine, Lieutenant-General of the Paris Police, who was an admirer of Le Mire's work, granted him twenty-four hours to do so. He took advantage of that time to print as many copies as he could. One of the surviving proofs may be seen at the municipal library in Rouen.

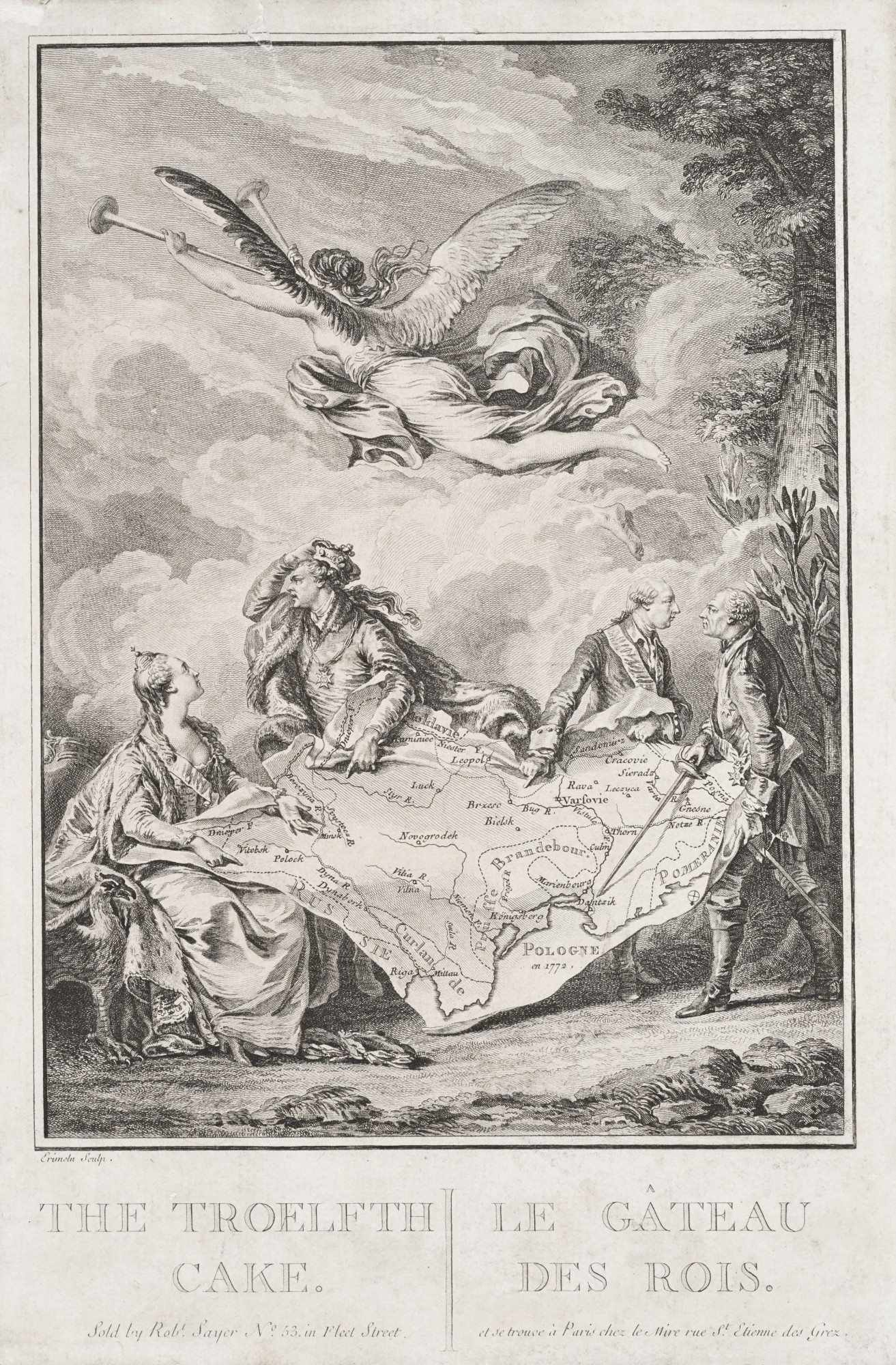
The Partition of Poland, or the Cake of Kings

He was an associate member of the academies of Rouen (1769), Vienna (1768) and Lille (1783)

His younger brother, Louis, was his student, as were Jean-Pierre Houël and Rémi Delvaux. It is unknown if any children came from his marriage to Barbe Desmoulins.
