= Joseph Werner =

Swiss painter (1637–1710)

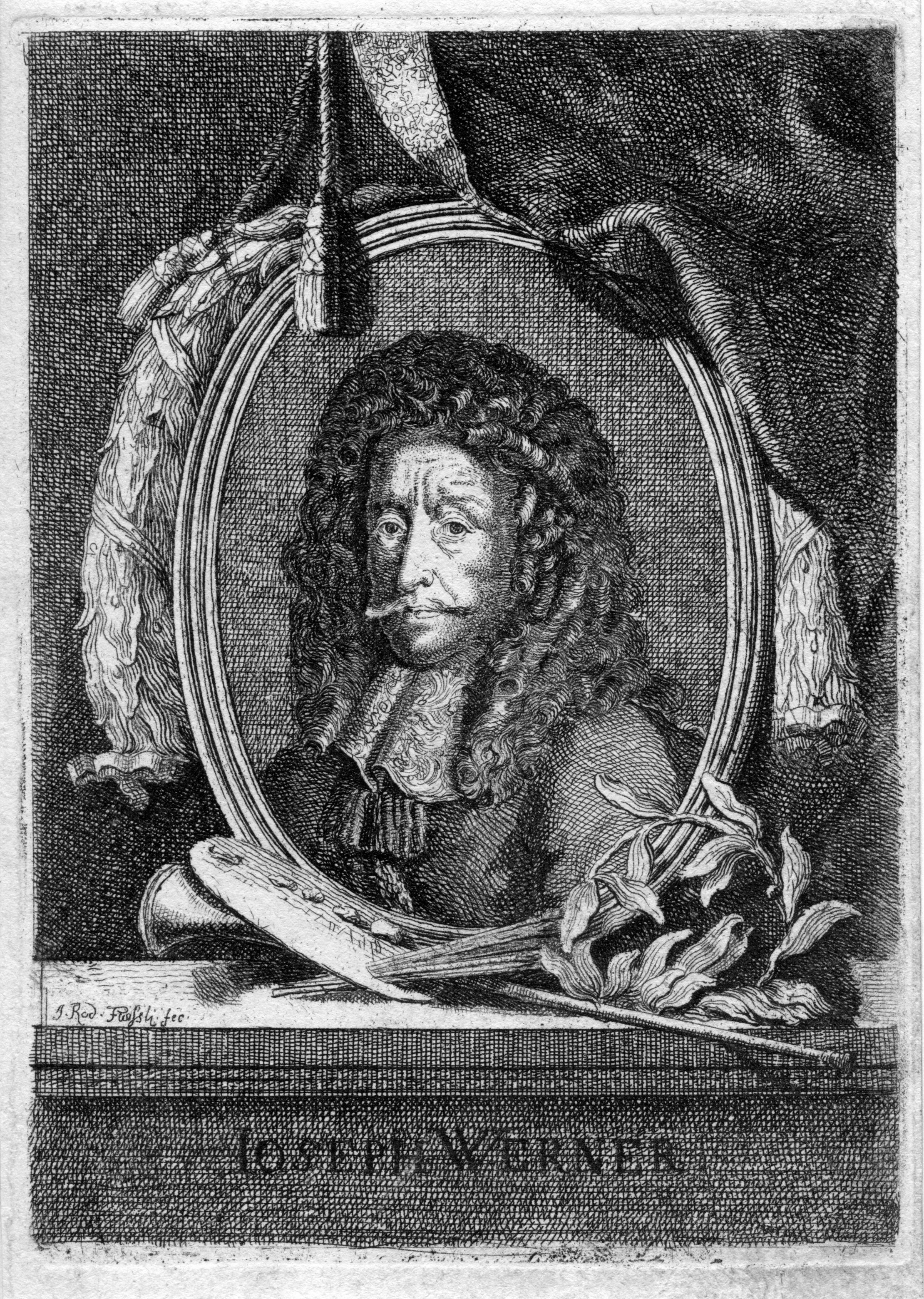
Joseph Werner in 1769.

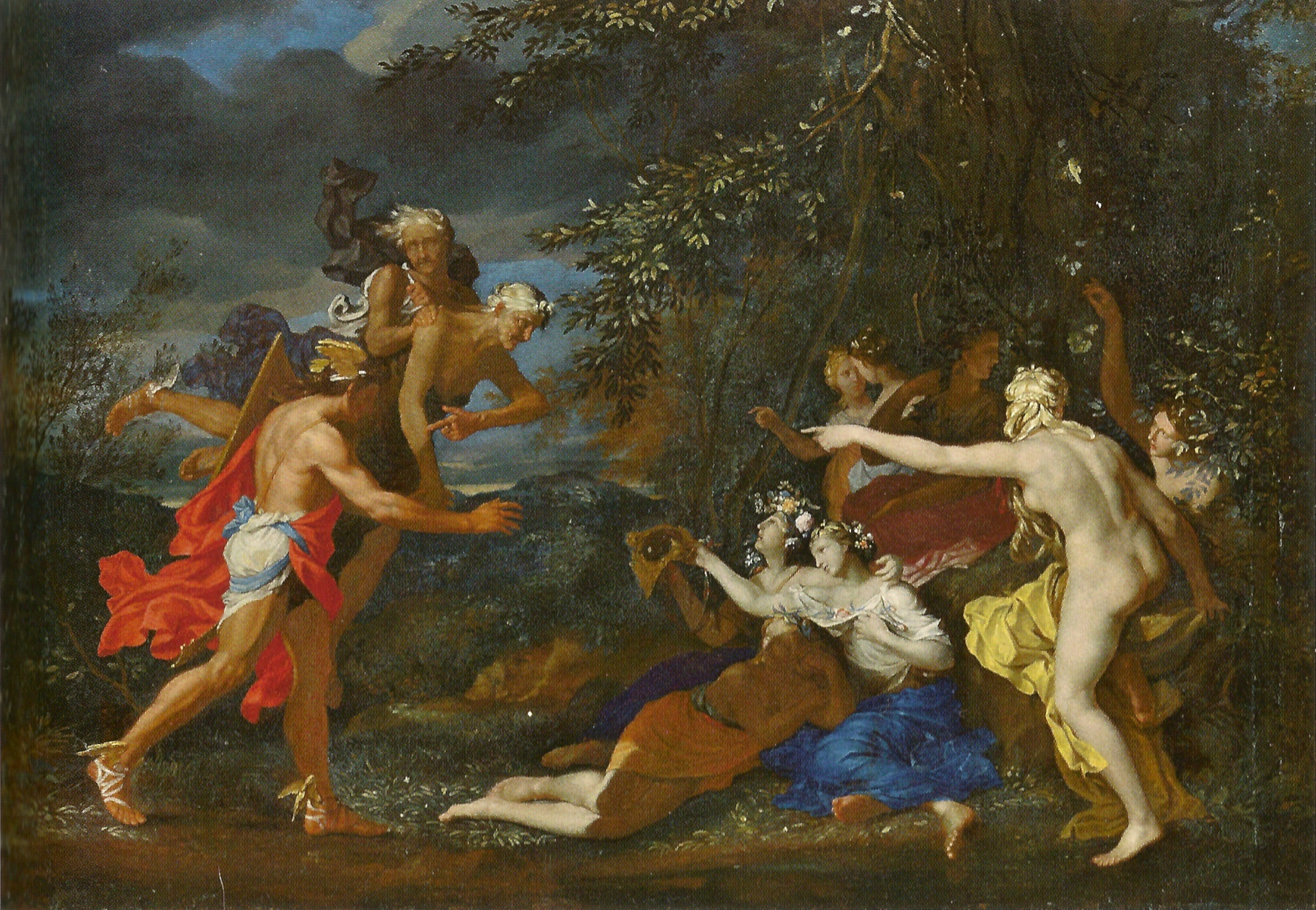
Joseph Werner, Perseus bei den Nymphen.

Joseph Werner (22 June 1637 – 21 September 1710), known as the Younger to distinguish him from his painter father of the same name, was a Swiss painter, known for miniatures.

Joseph Werner the Younger became an artist of international repute. He continued his studies in Frankfurt, went to Rome to paint and travelled to France where, at the court of Louis XIV he painted portraits of both the monarch himself and of various notables in his entourage; he also worked on the decorations of the Palace of Versailles. In 1667, he left France but continued to move in exalted circles. In Augsburg he worked for the Bavarian Elector in Vienna, painting a portrait of Leopold I, and was then invited to Berlin by the Prussian King Frederik. He earned a reputation as a miniatures painter at the court of the Saxon King in Dresden. In Berlin, he was appointed Director of the newly established Prussian Academy of Arts.

He passed his artistic talents on to his sons; his younger son Francis Paul becoming a painter of birds and his first born, Joseph Christopher Werner, becoming a court painter. In 1764, Joseph Christopher Werner made sketches of the royal insignia during the coronation of the last Polish king, Stanisław August Poniatowski. Werner's drawings are in the Royal Castle and Cabinet of Engravings at the University Library of Warsaw.

== Work ==
(small selection)

- Therese Kunigunde von Polen als Diana
- Zwei Bachantinnen
- Ludwig XIV in Volkstracht
- Mlle. de la Valliere in Volkstracht
- "Allegorie zur Vermählung"
- Perseus bei den Nymphen
