= Gerold Meyer von Knonau =

Gerold Meyer von Knonau may refer to:

- Gerold Meyer von Knonau (1804–1858), Swiss geographer, historian and archivist
- Gerold Meyer von Knonau (1843–1931), Swiss historian, son of the above
