= Katharina von Zimmern =

Last imperial abbess of Zürich from 1496 to 1524

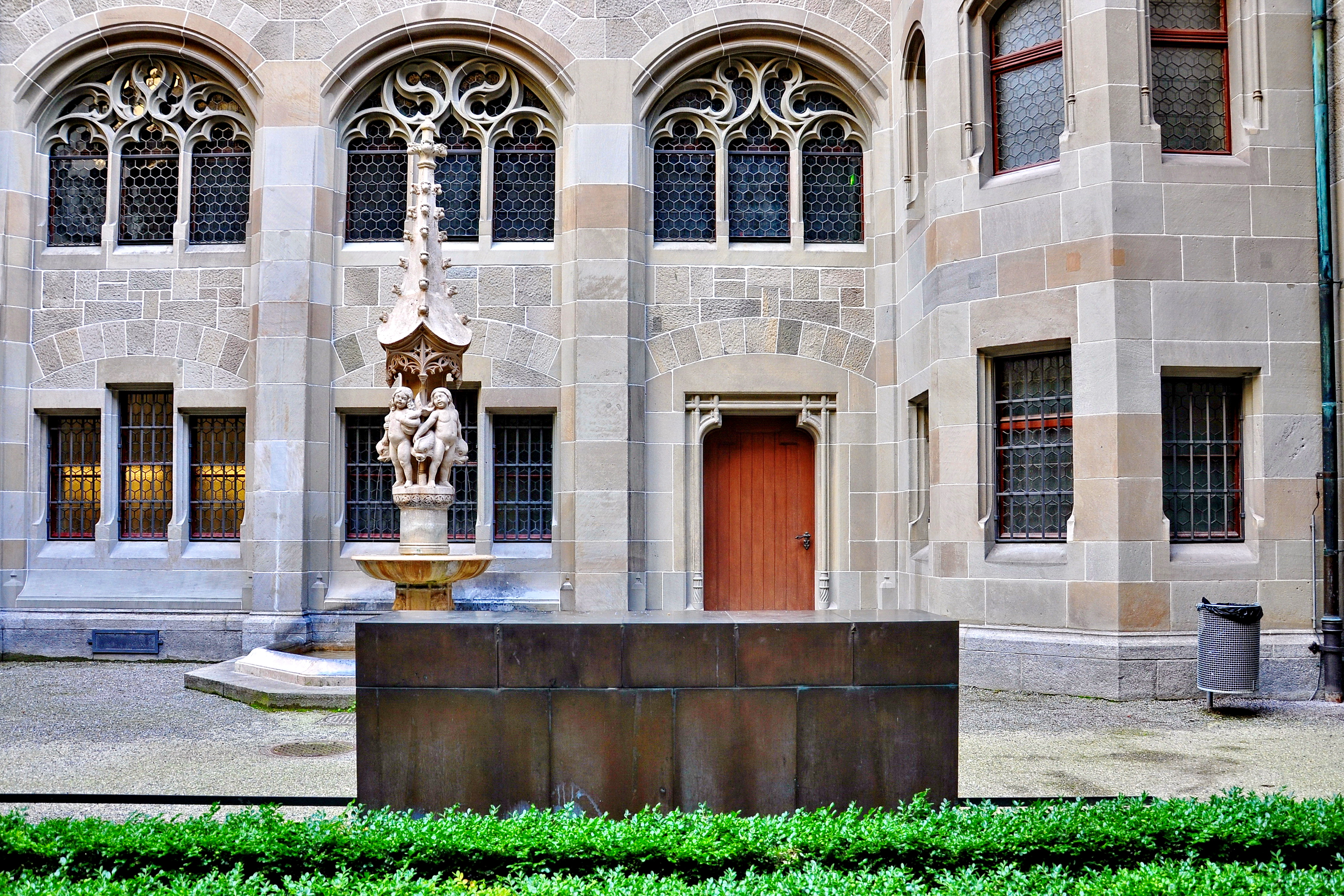
- Katharina von Zimmern memorial, Fraumünster cloister
- Born: c. 1478; Meßkirch, Holy Roman Empire
- Died: 17 August 1547 (aged 68–69); Neumarkt, Zürich, Swiss Confederacy
- Monuments: Katharina von Zimmern Memorial; Katharinenweg; Neumarkt 13
- Other names: Imperial abbess of Zürich; Katharina von Reischach
- Education: Fraumünster Abbey
- Occupations: Abbess; mistress of the city republic of Zürich
- Years active: 1496–1524
- Known for: Last abbess of the Fraumünster Abbey

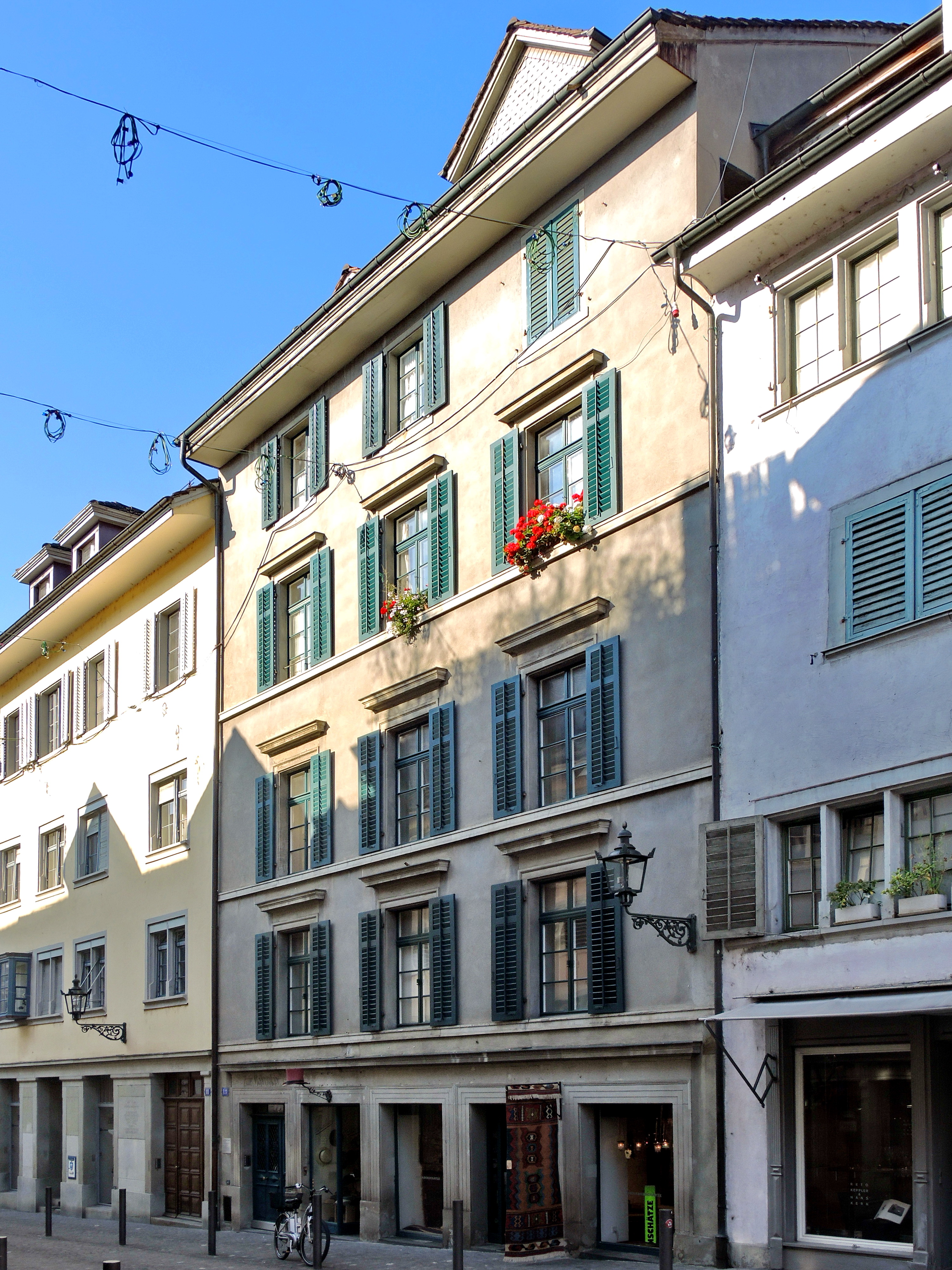
Mohrenkopf house, Neumarkt 13

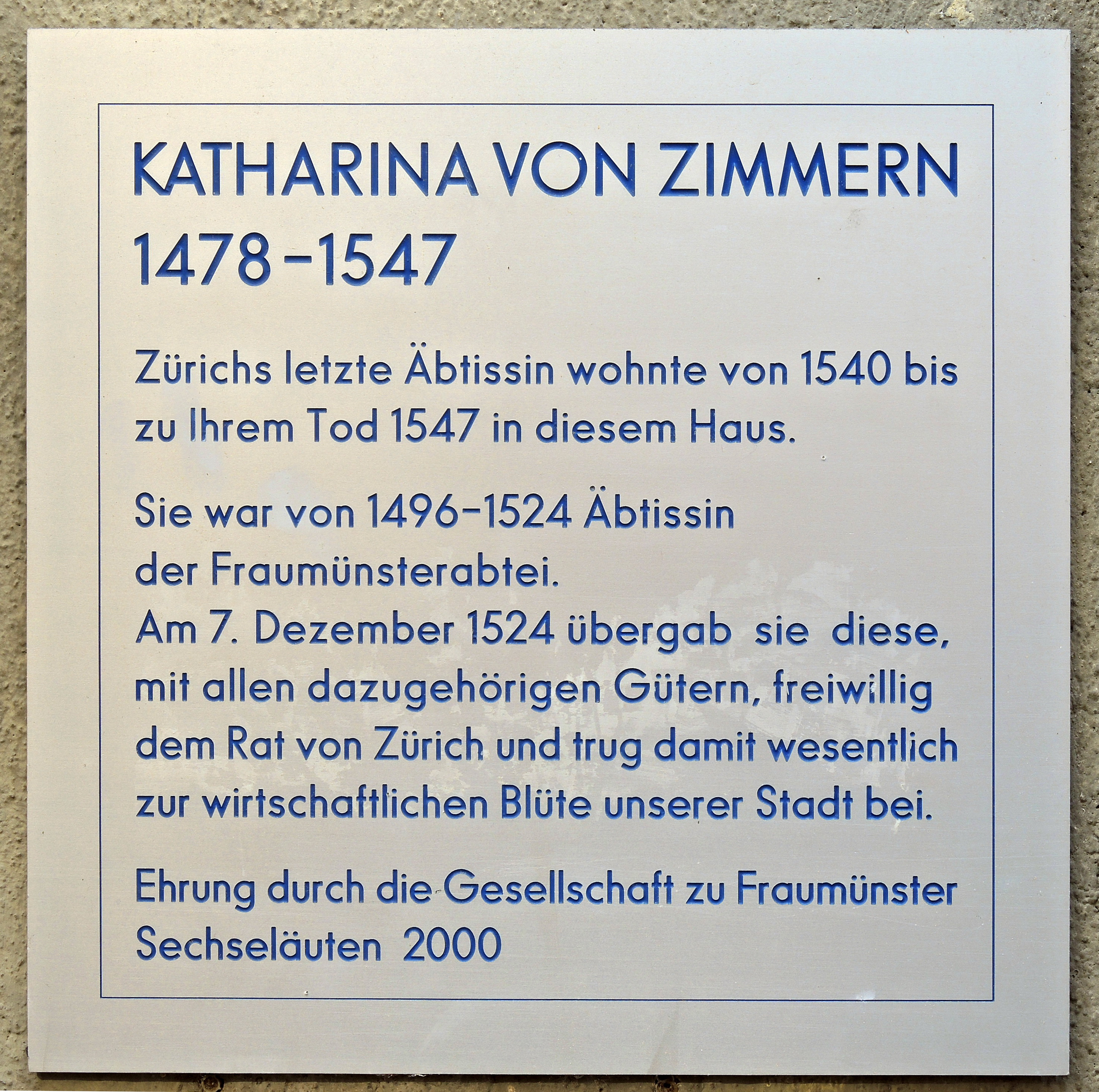
Plaque honoured by the Gesellschaft zu Fraumünster in 2000

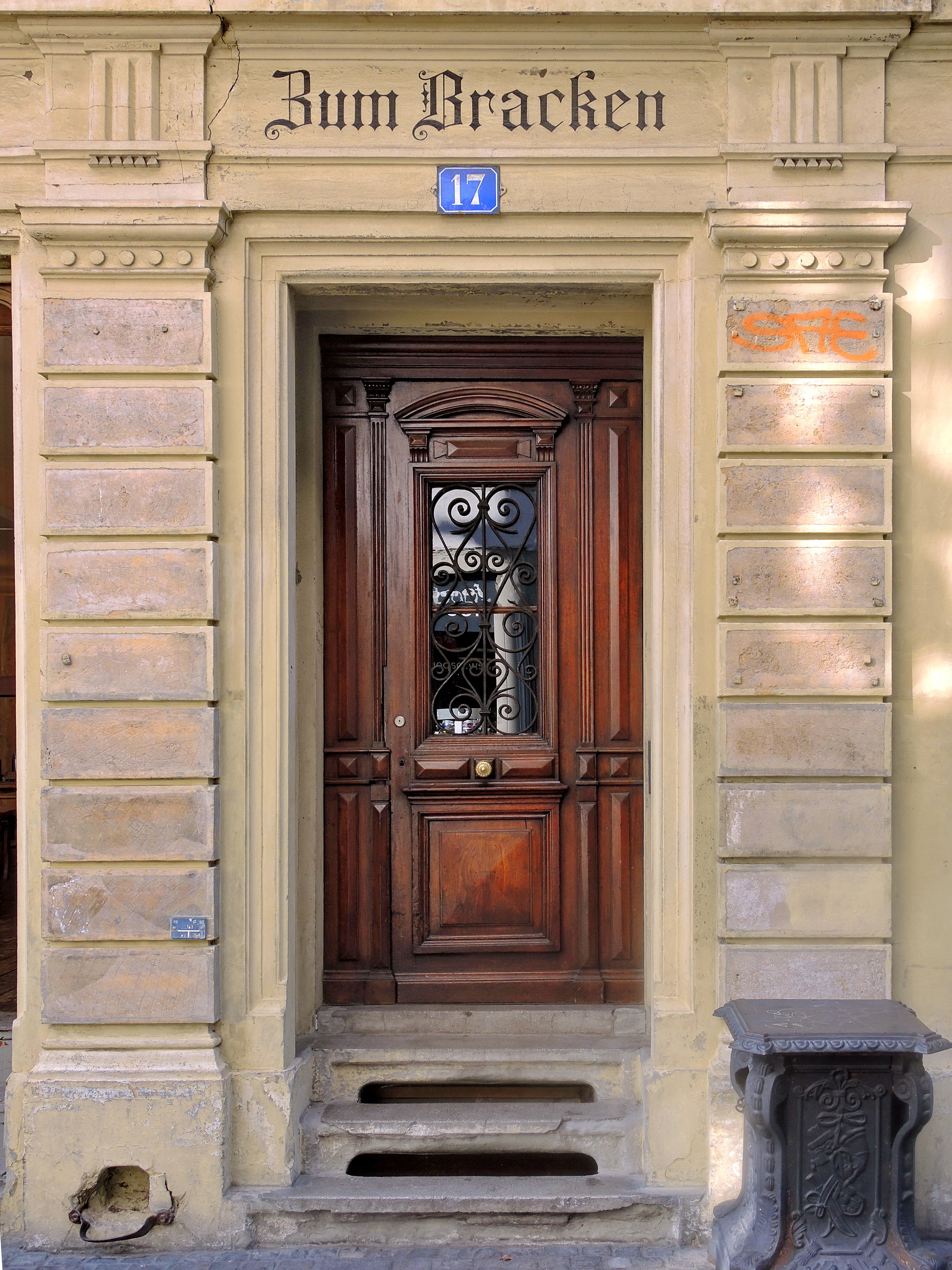
Bracken building, Oberdorfstrasse 17

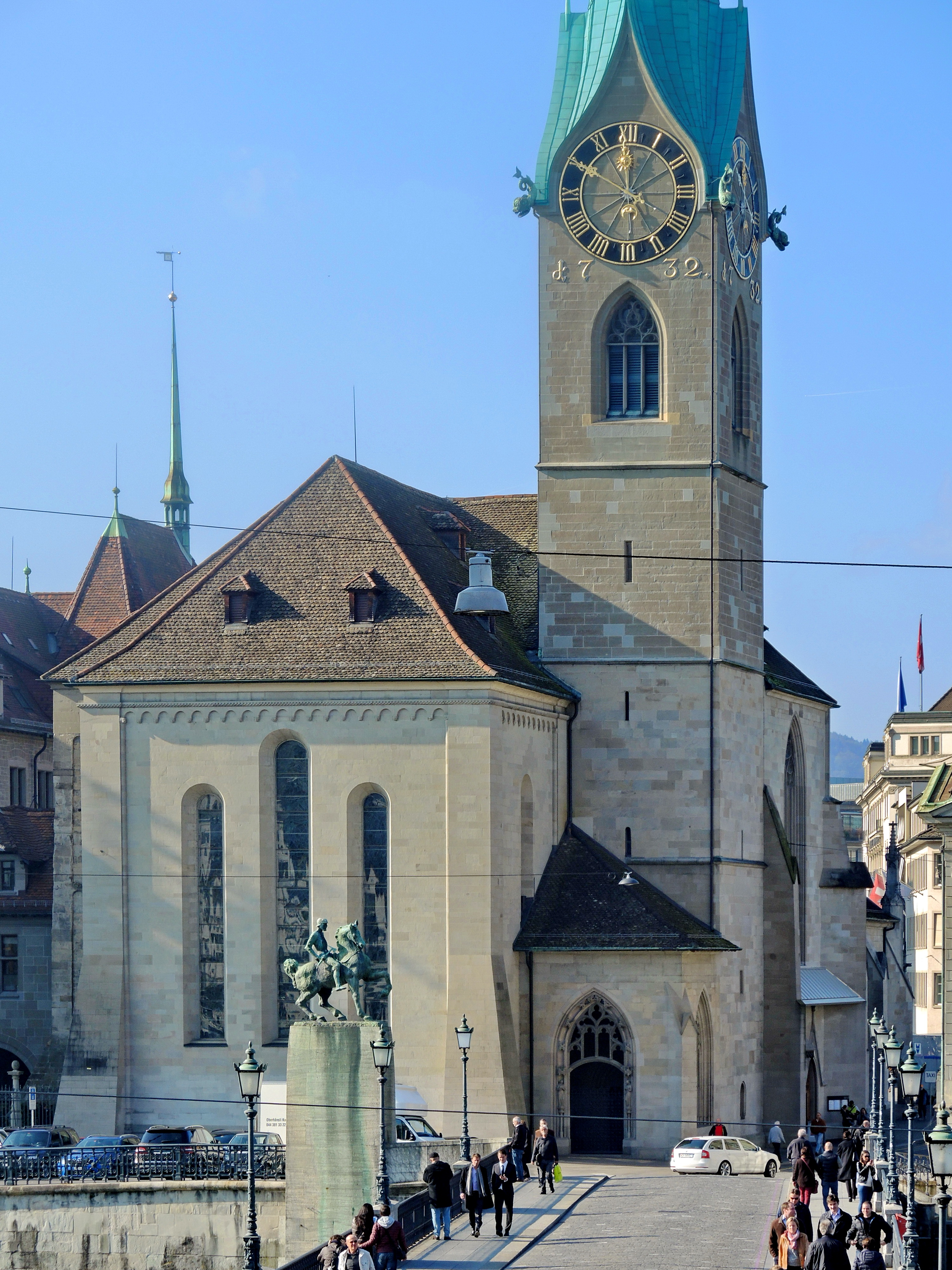
Fraumünster

Katharina von Zimmern (1478 – 17 August 1547), also known as the imperial abbess of Zürich and Katharina von Reischach, was the last abbess of the Fraumünster Abbey in Zürich.

== Early life ==
Katharina von Zimmern was born in 1478 in Messkirch into the rich southern German noble family of baron Hans Werner von Zimmern and countess Margarethe von Oettingen. Katharina was the fourth girl and had four further brothers and two sisters. Her father loved hunting, played several musical instruments, and was in the service of the Duke Sigmund of Tyrol. In 1488 he fell from the favour of Emperor Frederick III due to intrigues and was forced to flee with his family. Katharina survived an adventurous escape with her mother and some siblings to Weesen on Walensee lakeshore. Probably there she met in 1490 the 6-year-old Ulrich Zwingli, who had been given to his uncle, the parish priest in charge. Kathrina's father tried to accommodate her and her older sister in the Fraumünster Abbey in Zürich, which was reserved for aristocratic women. Supported by Albrecht von Bonstetten, the dean of the Einsiedeln Abbey allowed the two young women to enter the monastery life in 1491 and 1494 respectively. However, morally questionable conditions prevailed in the abbey and the young girls were molested by priests, so Katharina and her sister returned for a short time to their family's house.

== Abbess of the Fraumünster Abbey ==
In 1496, when Katharina was 18 years old, she was elected to be the abbess, and now the head of the large monastery's household. Being still a Benedictine abbey, the noble women had a free life. Extensive lands with many subjects and people were entrusted to Katharina von Zimmern, supported by the management of an experienced staff, but the main responsibility lay with Katharina. She had all the rights to act, to buy and sell goods, as well the old prerogative of mercy in the city and the right to elect the mayor, even to grant pardons on death sentences. Katharina von Zimmern reorganized the finances of the abbey, tried to regain the old comprehensive right of coinage of the city, and was very active in construction and art.

She led the construction of the abbey buildings, which existed until 1898, as well as the interior painting of the former Maria chapel in the Fraumünster cathedral, a church bell with humanistic inscriptions. She may also have been one of the patrons of Hans Leu the Elder, according to a document of around 1500. Two of the beautiful, intricately decorated rooms known as Hof der Äbtissin, where the abbess kept audience, were installed in 1892 at the Swiss National Museum.

During her 28-year tenure as abbess, Katharina was rarely called in the council records of the city, because her reign brought no complaints within the city of Zürich. Unlike her predecessors, she led the abbey successfully and with tact and discretion. In 1503 four young noble women entered the convent, so that their number was increased to seven. The abbey also included a school which was rebuilt under Katharina. Although the abbesses in the late Middle Ages largely had lost political influence, Katharina was still nominally the city mistress of Zürich and thus the first representative of the city, i.e. all official guests were first greeted by her. As Reichsfürstin (imperial princess) the abbess was in the Holy Roman Empire part of a strictly limited group of about 100 people who were in the hierarchy directly below the Kurfürst's. Between 1505 and 1508 she constructed a new wing in which she adorned the corridors and chambers with mottos and over one door the coats or arms of her parents were placed.

Living in transition times, Katharina von Zimmern allowed Oswald Myconius, a close friend of Zwingli, to teach Latin to the women at the cathedral school . In January 1519 Ulrich Zwingli began at the Grossmünster church to put the Gospel into the center of the mass and to translate the Bible into the German language. Zwingli wrote about Katharina von Zimmern: "She belongs to the party of Christ and does not refuse any Support to me." In 1523, the Reformation events themselves came headlong into the city of Zürich. After disputations in the town hall, the churches were cleared and most of the sculptures of saints were stored in the Wasserkirche. In the adjacent Dominican convent, the city council gave permission to close the monasteries. Most of the women left the Fraumünster Abbey, and the four remaining noble women of the convent went back to their families. Katharina remained with her assistant alone in the monastery and, without a monastic community in the midst of a reformed city, it was impossible to continue a monastery life corresponding to the Benedictine rules.

On 8 December 1524, on the feast of the Immaculate Conception, Katharina von Zimmern passed the abbey into the possession of the city of Zürich. Two documents attest to this serious act: The waiver of 30 November and the transfer deed dated 8 December. The transfer deed, drawn up on parchment, with all assets and rights certified by Katharina von Zimmern, confirmed the transfer of the abbey to the city. Katharina assessed the political circumstances and current events properly, but stressed that they are free and self-determined, a conscience decision. A few days after the waiver, Zürich disbanded all other monasteries and took their goods. This became possible only after the abbess had agreed to the peaceful implementation of the Reformation in the city of Zurich.

== Late years ==
In 1524 Katharina von Zimmern was 46 years old, and her still Roman Catholic family had broken with her. She was included in the citizenship of the city of Zurich, retained the right of residence in the Abbey and received from the city a decent pension. But Katharina began again a new life: a few months after the surrender of the abbey, she married Eberhard von Reischach and gave birth, despite their advanced age, to two children, a daughter and a son who died early. Zwingli describes in a letter to Katharina Vadian the major concern to the family. Eberhard von Reischach was the member of an impoverished noble family from Hegau, was 15 years older than Katharina, and was in the service of the Duke of Württemberg. As a mercenary leader, he had fought in the Swabian War in 1499 for Zürich and thus acquired the citizenship of the city in 1500. He was married with Verena Göldli with whom he had four children, and had to leave Zurich. Widowed and banished from Zurich, Reischach lived in Schaffhausen, Katharina moved with him, and two years later they moved to Diessenhofen. In 1529 the Wars of Kappel began, Reischach was reinstated in the service of the city, and the family moved back to Zürich. Eberhard fell in the battle of Kappel on 11 October 1531.

In 1536, Katharina rescinded her right of residence in the Fraumünster in exchange for 520 pounds. Later she was mentioned as the owner of the Bracken house at Oberdorfstrasse in Zürich and in 1540 she sold the Bracken and bought the larger Mohrenkopf house at Neumarkt 13 where she and her daughter found a new home. Together with Zwingli's wife Anna Reinhart, Katharina von Zimmern was included in the Constaffel society.

In a document of the city council of Zürich, Katharina von Zimmern was mentioned as mediator related to a financial affair between the city of Luzern, Aegeri, and the Fraumünster church on 31 July 1545. She was still highly respected and was in the account books of the city listed as "Eptissin" (abbess). Her daughter Anna married Heinrich von Mandach, who owned the house next door at Neumarkt. On 17 August 1547, Katharina von Zimmern died at home. For a long time the date of death was not known, although it was listed in an attachment in the council book. It seems no location is listed in the official records where Katharina von Zimmern is buried.

== Reformation in Zürich and aftermath ==
Katharina von Zimmern allowed Zwingli to preach in Fraumünster every Friday when there was market day on the Münsterhof square. Thus, the farmers and traders gathered in front of the church from the surrounding villages in the Canton of Zürich. They attended services at the cathedral and so were familiar with the message of the Reformation. So Katharina contributed to the Reformation and she may have actively supported the Reformation process, while handing over the Abbey to the city to prevent bloodshed. She married one of Zwingli's followers, and as a widow she stayed in the city and actively participated in the newly formed Reformed Church of the canton of Zürich.

== Äbtissinenstube ==
As well as the interior decoration of the dormitory of the Oetenbach nunnery, the so-called Äbtissinnenstuben of the Fraumünster abbey, the last residence of Katharina von Zimmern, thanks to their uninterrupted use and appreciation of the institutions established there, remained in use until a few years before the demolition of the monastic buildings occurred. The wood-carved wainscoting were transferred to the Swiss National Museum in Zürich.

== Katharina von Zimmern memorial ==
On 14 March 2004, the Katharina von Zimmern memorial was inaugurated at the former cloister of the Fraumünster Abbey. Anna-Maria Bauer, a sculptor from Zürich, created a sculpture that consists of 37 copper blocks that are layered into a compact square. The shape of the sculpture refers to the shape of an altar table or burial and shines in its simplicity as a symbol of timelessness. On the floor a banner was engraved:

Die Stadt vor Unruhe und Umgemach bewahren und tun, was Zürich lieb und dienlich ist.

In 1923 the Katharinenweg street in Zürich-Enge was named after Katharina von Zimmern. In 2000 Katharina von Zimmern was honored by the Fraumünster society, and a plaque marks the house at Neumarkt 13 where she once lived.

== See also ==
- Gesellschaft zu Fraumünster

== Literature ==
- Regine Abegg: Spätgotische Stuben und Flachschnitzfriese aus dem Hof der Fraumünster-Äbtissin Katharina von Zimmern im Schweizerischen Landesmuseum. Published by Verein Katharina von Zimmern, Zürich 2008.
- Peter Niederhäuser and Dölf Wild: Das Fraumünster in Zürich. Von der Königsabtei zur Stadtkirche. Mitteilungen der Antiquarischen Gesellschaft in Zürich, Vol 80. Chronos Verlag, Zürich 2012.
