= Gerold Meyer von Knonau (1804–1858) =

Swiss archivist (1804–1858)

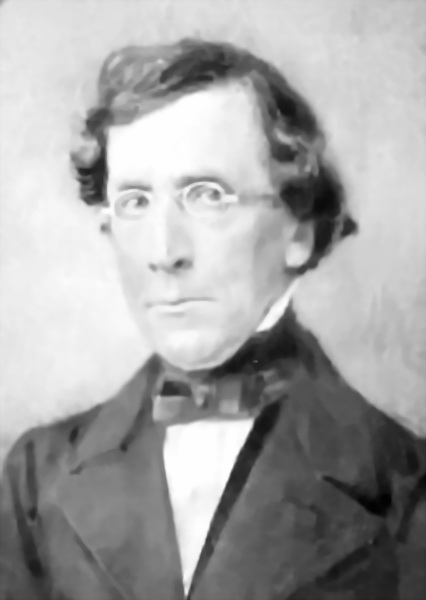
- Born: 2 March 1804; Zürich, Switzerland
- Died: 1 November 1858 (aged 54); Zürich, Switzerland
- Education: Berlin
- Occupations: Archivist; Historian; Geographer; Writer
- Successor: Johann Heinrich Hotz (1822–1883)
- Spouse: Emmerentiana Cleopha Meyer (1817–71)
- Children: Gerold Meyer von Knonau (1843–1931)
- Parents: Ludwig Meyer von Knonau (1769–1841) (father); Regula Lavater-Meyer (1773–1834) (mother)

Gerold Meyer von Knonau (2 March 1804 - 1 November 1858) was a Swiss geographer and historian whose most enduring contribution to scholarship may well have been his pioneering work between 1837 and 1858 as cantonal archivist for Zürich and the surrounding region.

He is often confused, wrongly, with his eponymous son, who was also a Swiss historian: Gerold Meyer von Knonau, the son, was a prolific contributor to the widely respected Allgemeine Deutsche Biographie (multi-volume biographical dictionary).

== Life ==
Gerold Meyer von Knonau was born and grew up, like his father before him, in Zürich. He was the elder of his parents' two recorded sons. There were also two sisters. Ludwig Meyer von Knonau (1769–1841), his father, was a leading politician who, like his son and grandson, had himself acquired a measure of notability as an historian. The Meyer von Knonau family had been part of (or close to) the Zürich oligarchy since at least as far back as 1363. Regula Lavater-Meyer (1773–1834), Gerold's mother, came from a long line of notable Zürich philosophers and physicians. Her father, Johann Jakob Lavater (1750–1807), was a hospital worker and a city judge.

He received his schooling in Zürich and then, in 1824, moved with his brilliant but shy younger brother Konrad to Berlin in order to complete a broadly based programme of study that included civic administration and Jurisprudence. His time in Berlin brought him into contact with German scholars and also enabled him to progress his interest in Geography. One of those whom he met in Berlin in connection with his Geography studies was Carl Ritter. The two men became lifelong friends. From Berlin he moved west, probably during 1826, to France, where he met the francophile philosopher Philipp Albert Stapfer, with whom he subsequently corresponded. Following a lengthy stay, he returned home to Zürich in 1827.

Between 1827 and 1837 he worked in an administrative capacity for the city administration. His work in local government left him with time and energy for various forms of charitable work and to sustain a parallel career as a researcher. He produced a couple of popular-scholarly books during this period, reflecting his interests in Swiss history and geography, and with at least half an eye on the schools market. Within the Swiss intellectual élite he became increasingly well networked as a side-effect of his research work, notably with the polymath statistician-politician Stefano Franscini, with whom he would later collaborate on at least one statistical project.

Gerold Meyer von Knonau married the pharmacist's daughter, Emmerentiana Cleopha Meyer (1817–71) in 1837. Emmerentiana is described as a highly intelligent and well-educated woman who was able to support her husband's work both during his life and after his relatively early death. The marriage was followed in 1843 by the birth of the couple's son, another scholarly historian called Gerold Meyer von Knonau.

After a lengthy trip abroad Gerold Meyer von Knonau fell ill with Typhus and died on 1 November 1858 at Zürich. His body was buried at the Privatfriedhof Hohe Promenade (cemetery), a couple of hundred meters from the lakeshore.

== Work ==
=== Zürich's First Cantonal Archivist ===
In 1837 Meyer von Knonau accepted an appointment as the First Cantonal Archivist for the First Cantonal Archivist for the Canton of Zürich, a position he would retain until his death. He applied himself to making the accumulated records accessible, for the first time, to researchers. There was, in addition, an extensive programme of centralisation undertaken, with important separately held archival records being integrated into the main Cantonal Archive, starting in 1838 with the regional church archives. These were followed in 1840 by the cantonal financial records. An important expansion came in 1848 when the foundation archives of the Grossmünster (main Protestant Church) were taken over. Through the 1840s various archives relating to the cantonal commercial directorate were added The Cantonal Archive underwent a further significant expansion in 1853 when all the school records of the "Karolinum" academy attached to the Grossmünster were incorporated, together with land records and registers dating back to the Middle Ages that had hitherto been kept in the Grossmünster Sacristy, and records of contracts and property deeds registered with the old "Stadtstaat" (loosely, city state), from the days before the French term "canton" came to be commonly applied. He also, in 1839, created the first listing of archival records, and in 1850 the first printed set of plans for the Cantonal Archive. These were quickly rendered obsolete by the pace of acquisitions, however.

=== Historian and geographer ===
The "Abriss der erdbeschreibung und stastskunde der Schweiz" ("Outline Description of the Earth and Geography of Switzerland") which Meyer von Knonau published in 1824 reappeared as a greatly expanded two volume work in 1838/39 as the slightly more punchily titled "Erdkunde der schweizerischen Eidgenossenschaf" ("Geography of the Swiss confederation"). He also teamed up with the book dealer-publisher "Huber & Co" of St. Gallen to mastermind a plan for a "Comprehensive Description of Switzerland" and "In-depth Statistics", envisioned both as a reference source for students of Swiss Geography and as a travel guide. The intention was to provide "the most truthful guide to our homeland possible, both in terms of its present state and in terms of its former conditions". (Note: ...eine "ausführliche Statistik, die zugleich auch als Anleitung für Reisende zu dienen geeignet sei, eine Statistik, die ein möglichst treues Bild unseres Vaterlandes nicht nur nach seinem jetzigen, sondern auch nach seinem früheren Zustande verschaffe".)

There was also a succession of short biographical works, clearly targeting a wider audience. His 1835 biography of Anna Reinhart, wife to the influential Zürich reformation leader, Huldrych Zwingli, was and has probably remained the most widely read of these. It may be a reflection of the international interest in the subject of the biography that it was printed not in Switzerland but in Erlangen, a commercially dynamic city which had been well exceptionally networked internationally at least since as far back as 1685, after which it had become home to large numbers of Huguenots (i.e. Protestants). Also worth a mention is his 1833 volume "Heldinnen des Schweizerlands" ("Heroines of the Swiss lands"), a compilation of biographical essays by Meyer von Knonau which, unusually, incorporated a number of lithographic plate based illustrations, and which became popular among the reading classes of the time. In 1847 he published "Die Böcke, ein Beitrag zur zürcherischen Familien- und Sittengeschichte" (loosely, "Young bucks, a contribution to Zürich's family and moral history"), intended for. and evidently of interest to, a narrower readership.

During his later years Meyer von Knonau was able to combine his duties as Cantonal Archivist with an ever more broadly based contribution to literature. He pursued and applied his interest in the rapidly evolving study of Statistics, and corresponded with fellow scholars internationally. He also participated in the philosophical and scientific developments closer to home. He undertook a major project for the "General Swiss Historical Research Society" ("Schweizerische Gesellschaft für Geschichte" - as it was known at that time) to produce four volumes of an "archives series". In his capacity of Cantonal Archivist, in 1859 he published an "Archive of Kappel Abbey", a very large formerly Cistercian Monastery near Zürich that had recently been acquired by the municipality and converted for use as an orphanage and related welfare and schooling purposes. There was also a book on the Res gestae according to the imperial records residing in Zürich from the centuries before 1400. For numismatists he marked the 1852 Swiss Coinage reforms with a "Verzeichniß der Schweizerischen Münzen von den ältesten Zeiten bis auf die Gegenwart", a directory of Swiss coinage "from the earliest times to the present day". He expanded the Historical Atlas of Switzerland and oversaw contributions for the "Geschichtsfreund des historischen Vereins der fünf Orte" (loosely, "Friends of the Historical Association of the [five ancient Swiss] places". (Note: Luzern, Uri, Schwyz, Unterwalden ob dem Wald with Nid dem Wald and Zug) Towards the end of his life he accepted an offer from the federal (Swiss) government to publish the multi-volume archival collection "Sammlung der älteren eidgenössischen Abschiede", himself compiling the fifth volume, completed in 1856.

=== Historical-Geographical statistical portraits of Switzerland [by canton] ===
The "Historisch-geographisch-statistisches Gemälde der Schweiz" series, which Meyer von Knonau created and for many years managed, can be seen as his most important publishing venture. The volumes were described as a combination of "Housebook" and "Handbook" - reference works for the home. He himself authored the volumes on the Canton of Zürich which appeared in 1834 and the Canton of Schwyz.

In 1853 he got together with Salomon Vögelin to found the Zürcher Taschenbücher book publishing business.

=== Output (selection) ===
- Abriß der Erdbeschreibung und Staatskunde der Schweiz. Zürich, 1824.
- Heldinnen des Schweizerlands. Zürich, 1833.
- Hist.-geogr.-statist. Gemälde der Schweiz, Bände Kanton Zürich und Kanton Schwyz. Zürich, 1834/35.
- Züge aus dem Leben der Anna Reinhard, Gattin des schweizerischen Reformators Ulrich Zwingli. Erlangen, 1835.
- Erdkunde der schweiz. Eidgenossenschaft. Zürich, 1838/1839.
- Archiv, Bd. I–IV der Allgemeinen geschichtforschenden Gesellschaft der Schweiz. Zürich, 1840–1845.
- Die Böcke, ein Beitrag zur zürcherischen Familien- und Sittengeschichte. Zürich, 1847.
- Bibliothek der Schweizergeschichte, Edition von Gottl. Eman. v. Haller
- Verzeichniß der Schweizerischen Münzen von den ältesten Zeiten bis auf die Gegenwart
- Edition der Älteren eidg. Abschiede, Band 8 bzw. Jahre 1778–1798. Zürich, 1852.
- Zürcher. Volkssagen. Zürich, 1853.
- Die Chronik im weissen Buche zu Sarnen. Zürich, 1857.
