= Huldrych Zwingli =

Protestant Reformation leader in Switzerland, Swiss Reformed Church founder (1484–1531)

Ulrich Zwingli
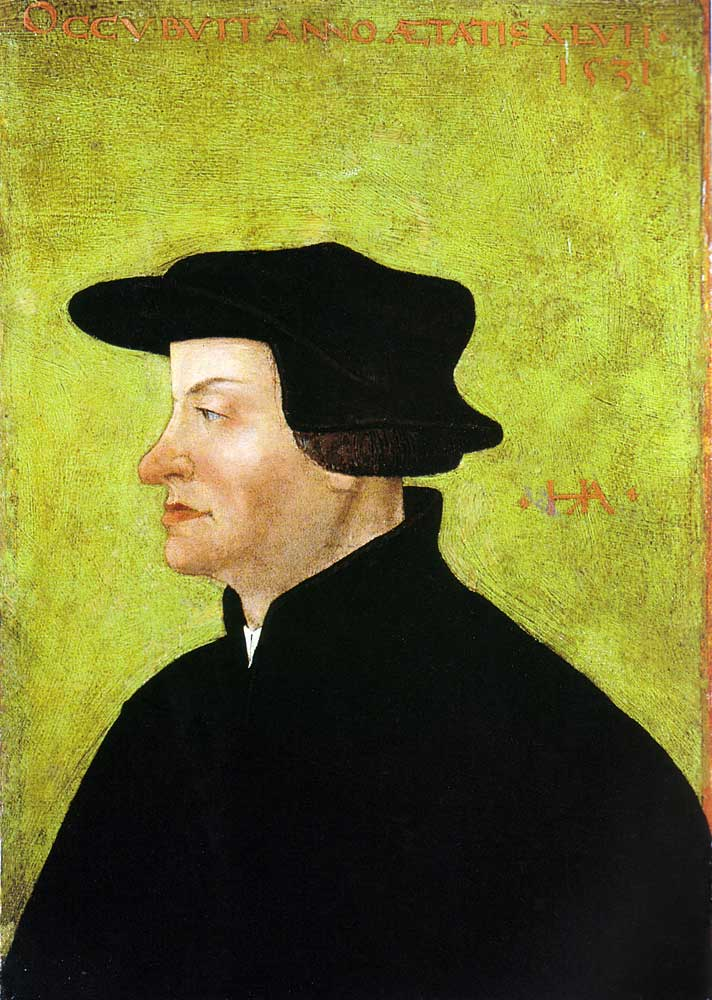
- 1531 portrait
- Born: 1 January 1484; Wildhaus, Protectorate of the Princely Abbey of Saint Gall
- Died: 11 October 1531 (aged 47); Kappel, Canton of Zurich, Swiss Confederation
- Education: University of Vienna; University of Basel
- Occupations: Pastor; theologian
- Spouse: Anna Reinhard (m. 1524)
- Theological work
- Era: Renaissance
- Tradition or movement: Roman Catholicism (until 1522); Reformed Roman Catholicism; from 1519 until 1522; Reformed Protestantism; Zwinglian; from 1522 until 1531
- Main interests: Christian worship; soteriology; sacramentalism
- Notable ideas: Memorialism; iconoclasm

Huldrych Zwingli (Note: English: /ˈzwɪŋɡli/ ZWING-glee; German: [ˈhʊldriːç ˈʊlrɪç ˈtsvɪŋli]) (born Ulrich Zwingli; (Note: Zwingli's given name was Ulrich, but he used the latinized spelling Huldricus or Huldrychus Zwinglius. In his enrollment in the University of Vienna (1500), he still latinised his name as Udalricus Zwingling de Lichtensteig. His signature at the Marburg Colloquy (1529) was Huldrychus Zwinglius. Modern literature uses either Ulrich (e.g. Potter) or Huldrych (e.g. Gäbler, Stephens, and Furcha).) 1 January 1484 – 11 October 1531) was a Swiss Christian theologian, musician, and leader of the Reformation in Switzerland. Born during a time of emerging Swiss patriotism and increasing criticism of the Swiss mercenary system, he attended the University of Vienna and the University of Basel, a scholarly center of Renaissance humanism. He continued his studies while he served as a pastor in Glarus and later in Einsiedeln, where he was influenced by the writings of Erasmus. During his tenures at Basel and Einsiedeln, Zwingli began to familiarize himself with many criticisms Christian institutions were facing regarding their reform guidance and garnered scripture which aimed to address such criticisms.

In 1519, Zwingli became the Leutpriester (people's priest) of the Grossmünster in Zurich where he began to preach ideas on reform of the Catholic Church. In his first public controversy in 1522, he attacked the custom of fasting during Lent. In his publications, he noted corruption in the ecclesiastical hierarchy, promoted clerical marriage, and attacked the use of images in places of worship. Among his most notable contributions to the Reformation was his expository preaching, starting in 1519, through the Gospel of Matthew, before eventually using Biblical eisegesis to go through the entire New Testament, a radical departure from the Catholic Mass. In 1525, he introduced a new communion liturgy to replace the Mass. He also clashed with the Anabaptists, which resulted in their persecution. Historians have debated whether or not he turned Zurich into a theocracy.

The Reformation spread to other parts of the Swiss Confederation, but several cantons resisted, preferring to remain Catholic. Zwingli formed an alliance of Reformed cantons which divided the Confederation along religious lines. In 1529, a war was averted at the last moment between the two sides. Meanwhile, Zwingli's ideas came to the attention of Martin Luther and other reformers. They met at the Marburg Colloquy and agreed on many points of doctrine, but they could not reach an accord on the doctrine of the Real Presence of Christ in the Eucharist.

In 1531, Zwingli's alliance applied an unsuccessful food blockade on the Catholic cantons. The cantons responded with an attack at a moment when Zurich was ill-prepared, and Zwingli died on the battlefield. His legacy lives on in the confessions, liturgy, and church orders of the Reformed churches of today.

== Historical context ==
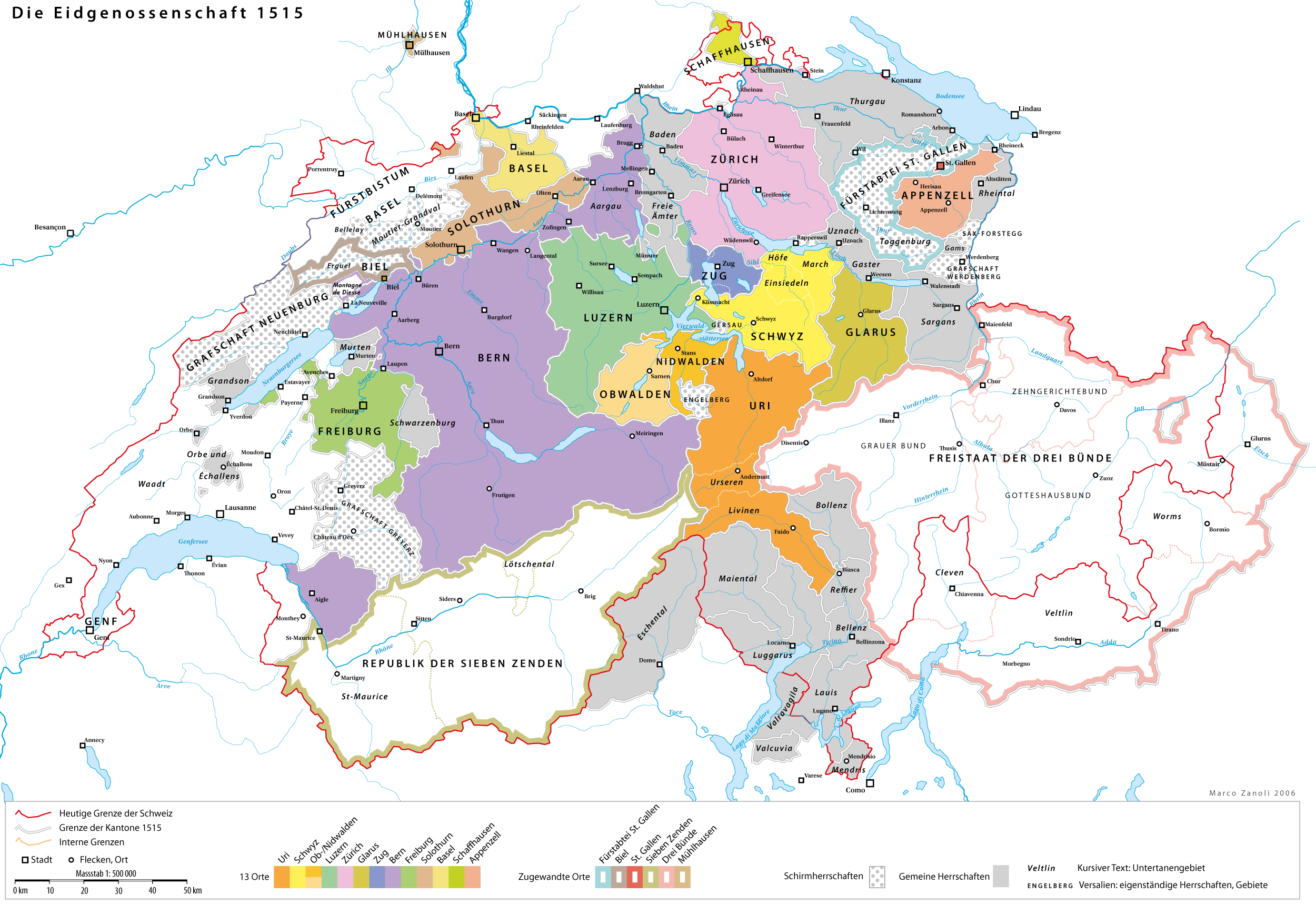
Map of the Swiss Confederation in 1515.

The Swiss Confederation in Huldrych Zwingli's time consisted of thirteen states (cantons) as well as affiliated areas and common lordships. Unlike the modern state of Switzerland, which operates under a federal government, each of the thirteen cantons was nearly independent, conducting its own domestic and foreign affairs. Each canton formed its own alliances within and without the Confederation. This relative independence served as the basis for conflict during the time of the Reformation when the various cantons divided between different confessional camps. Military ambitions gained an additional impetus with the competition to acquire new territory and resources, as seen for example in the Old Zurich War of 1440–1446.

The wider political environment in Europe during the 15th and 16th centuries was also volatile. For centuries the relationship with the Confederation's powerful neighbour, France, determined the foreign policies of the Swiss. Nominally, the Confederation formed a part of the Holy Roman Empire. However, through a succession of wars culminating in the Swabian War in 1499, the Confederation had become de facto independent. As the two continental powers and minor regional states such as the Duchy of Milan, the Duchy of Savoy, and the Papal States competed and fought against each other, there were far-reaching political, economic, and social consequences for the Confederation. During this time the mercenary pension system became a subject of disagreement. The religious factions of Zwingli's time debated vociferously the merits of sending young Swiss men to fight in foreign wars mainly for the enrichment of the cantonal authorities.

These internal and external factors contributed to the rise of a Confederation national consciousness, in which the term fatherland (Latin: patria) began to take on meaning beyond a reference to an individual canton. At the same time, Renaissance humanism, with its universal values and emphasis on scholarship (as exemplified by Erasmus, the "prince of humanism"), had taken root in the Confederation. Within this environment, defined by the confluence of Swiss patriotism and humanism, Zwingli was born in 1484.

== Life ==
=== Early years (1484–1518) ===
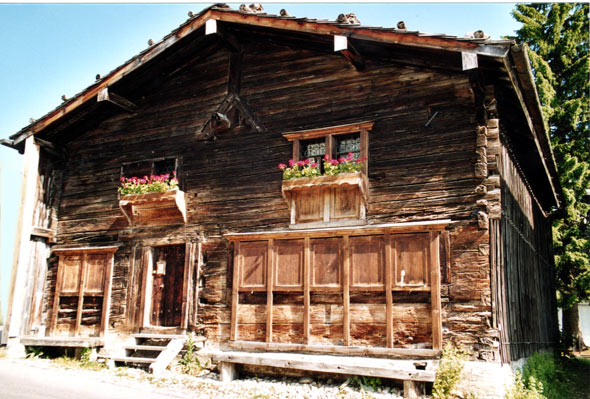
House where Zwingli was born in Wildhaus in what is now the Canton of St. Gallen

Huldrych Zwingli was born on 1 January 1484 in Wildhaus, in the Toggenburg valley of Switzerland, to a family of farmers, the third child of eleven. His father, Ulrich, played a leading role in the administration of the community (Amtmann or chief local magistrate). Zwingli's primary schooling was provided by his uncle, Bartholomew, a cleric in Weesen, where he probably met Katharina von Zimmern. At ten years old, Zwingli was sent to Basel to obtain his secondary education where he learned Latin under Magistrate Gregory Bünzli. After three years in Basel, he stayed a short time in Bern with the humanist Henry Wölfflin. The Dominicans in Bern tried to persuade Zwingli to join their order and it is possible that he was received as a novice.

However, his father and uncle disapproved of such a course and he left Bern without completing his Latin studies. He enrolled in the University of Vienna in the winter semester of 1498 but was expelled, according to the university's records. However, it is not certain that Zwingli was indeed expelled, and he re-enrolled in the summer semester of 1500; his activities in 1499 are unknown. Zwingli continued his studies in Vienna until 1502, after which he transferred to the University of Basel where he received the Master of Arts degree (Magister) in 1506. In Basel, one of Zwingli's teachers was Thomas Wyttenbach from Biel, with whom he later corresponded on the doctrine of transubstantiation.

Zwingli was ordained in Constance, the seat of the local diocese, by Bishop Hugo von Hohenlandenberg, and he celebrated his first Mass in his hometown, Wildhaus, on 29 September 1506. As a young priest he had studied little theology, but this was not considered unusual at the time. His first ecclesiastical post was the pastorate of the town of Glarus, where he stayed for ten years. It was in Glarus, whose soldiers were used as mercenaries in Europe, that Zwingli became involved in politics. The Swiss Confederation was embroiled in various campaigns with its neighbours: the French, the Habsburgs, and the Papal States. Zwingli placed himself solidly on the side of the Roman See. In return, Pope Julius II honoured Zwingli by providing him with an annual pension. He took the role of chaplain in several campaigns in Italy, including the Battle of Novara in 1513.

However, the decisive defeat of the Swiss in the Battle of Marignano caused a shift in mood in Glarus in favour of the French rather than the pope. Zwingli, the papal partisan, found himself in a difficult position and he decided to retreat to Einsiedeln in the canton of Schwyz. By this time, he had become convinced that mercenary service was immoral and that Swiss unity was indispensable for any future achievements. Some of his earliest extant writings, such as The Ox (1510) and The Labyrinth (1516), attacked the mercenary system using allegory and satire. His countrymen were presented as virtuous people within a French, imperial, and papal triangle.

Zwingli stayed in Einsiedeln for two years during which he withdrew completely from politics in favour of ecclesiastical activities and personal studies. His time as pastor of Glarus and Einsiedeln was characterized by inner growth and development. He perfected his Greek and he took up the study of Hebrew. His library contained over three hundred volumes from which he was able to draw upon classical, patristic, and scholastic works. He exchanged scholarly letters with a circle of Swiss humanists and began to study the writings of Erasmus. He continued his studies while he served as a pastor in Glarus and later in Einsiedeln, where he was influenced by the writings of Erasmus. Zwingli took the opportunity to meet him while Erasmus was in Basel between August 1514 and May 1516. Zwingli's turn to relative pacifism and his focus on preaching can be traced to the influence of Erasmus.

In late 1518, the post of the Leutpriestertum (people's priest) of the Grossmünster at Zurich became vacant. The canons of the foundation that administered the Grossmünster recognised Zwingli's reputation as a fine preacher and writer. His connection with humanists was a decisive factor as several canons were sympathetic to Erasmian reform. In addition, his opposition to the French and to mercenary service was welcomed by Zurich politicians. On 11 December 1518, the canons elected Zwingli to become the stipendiary priest and on 27 December he moved permanently to Zurich.

=== Beginning of Zurich ministry (1519–1521) ===
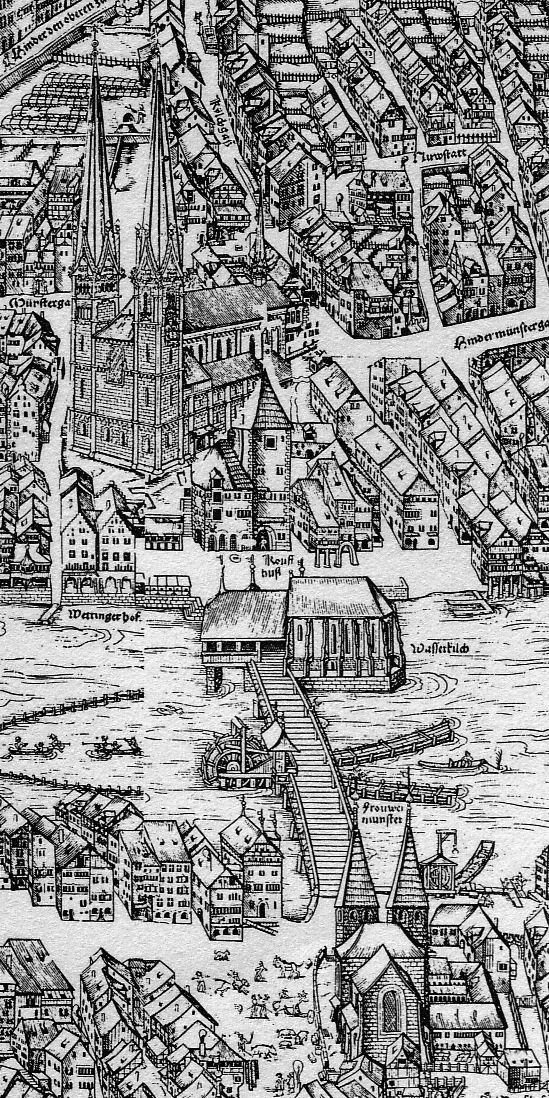
The Grossmünster in the centre of the medieval town of Zurich (Murerplan, 1576)

On 1 January 1519, Zwingli gave his first sermon in Zurich. Deviating from the prevalent practice of basing a sermon on the Gospel lesson of a particular Sunday, Zwingli, using Erasmus' New Testament as a guide, began to read through the Gospel of Matthew, giving his interpretation during the sermon, known as the method of lectio continua. He continued to read and interpret the book on subsequent Sundays until he reached the end and then proceeded in the same manner with the Acts of the Apostles, the New Testament epistles, and finally the Old Testament. His motives for doing this are not clear, but in his sermons he used exhortation to achieve moral and ecclesiastical improvement which were goals comparable with Erasmian reform. Sometime after 1520, Zwingli's theological model began to evolve into an idiosyncratic form that was neither Erasmian nor Lutheran. Scholars do not agree on the process of how he developed his own unique model. One view is that Zwingli was trained as an Erasmian humanist and Luther played a decisive role in changing his theology.

Another view is that Zwingli did not pay much attention to Luther's theology and in fact he considered it as part of the humanist reform movement. A third view is that Zwingli was not a complete follower of Erasmus, but had diverged from him as early as 1516 and that he independently developed his theology.

Zwingli's theological stance was gradually revealed through his sermons. He attacked moral corruption and in the process he named individuals who were the targets of his denunciations. Monks were accused of indolence and high living. In 1519, Zwingli specifically rejected the veneration of saints and called for the need to distinguish between their true and fictional accounts. He cast doubts on hellfire, asserted that unbaptised children were not damned, and questioned the power of excommunication. His attack on the claim that tithing was a divine institution, however, had the greatest theological and social impact. This contradicted the immediate economic interests of the foundation. One of the elderly canons who had supported Zwingli's election, Konrad Hofmann, complained about his sermons in a letter. Some canons supported Hofmann, but the opposition never grew very large. Zwingli insisted that he was not an innovator and that the sole basis of his teachings was Scripture.

Within the diocese of Constance, Bernhardin Sanson was offering a special indulgence for contributors to the building of St Peter's in Rome. When Sanson arrived at the gates of Zurich at the end of January 1519, parishioners prompted Zwingli with questions. He responded with displeasure that the people were not being properly informed about the conditions of the indulgence and were being induced to part with their money on false pretences. This was over a year after Martin Luther published his Ninety-five Theses (31 October 1517). The council of Zurich refused Sanson entry into the city. As the authorities in Rome were anxious to contain the fire started by Luther, the Bishop of Constance denied any support of Sanson and he was recalled.

In August 1519, Zurich was struck by an outbreak of the plague during which at least one in four persons died. All of those who could afford it left the city, but Zwingli remained and continued his pastoral duties. In September, he caught the disease and nearly died. He described his preparation for death in a poem, Zwingli's Pestlied, consisting of three parts: the onset of the illness, the closeness to death, and the joy of recovery. The final verses of the first part read:

Thuo, wie du wilt; mich nüt befilt. Din haf bin ich. Mach gantz ald brich; dann nimpst mich hin der geiste min von diser Erd, thuost du's, dass er nit böser werd, ald anderen nit befleck ir läben fromm und sit.	Thy purpose fulfil: nothing can be too severe for me. I am thy vessel, for you to make whole or break to pieces. Since, if you take hence my spirit from this earth, you do it so that it will not grow evil, and will not mar the pious lives of others.

In the years following his recovery, Zwingli's opponents remained in the minority. When a vacancy occurred among the canons of the Grossmünster, Zwingli was elected to fulfill that vacancy on 29 April 1521. In becoming a canon, he became a full citizen of Zurich. He also retained his post as the people's priest of the Grossmünster.

=== First rifts (1522–1524) ===
The first public controversy regarding Zwingli's preaching broke out during the season of Lent in 1522. On the first fasting Sunday, 9 March, Zwingli and about a dozen other participants consciously transgressed the fasting rule by cutting and distributing two smoked sausages (the Wurstessen in Christoph Froschauer's workshop). Zwingli defended this act in a sermon which was published on 16 April, under the title Von Erkiesen und Freiheit der Speisen (Regarding the Choice and Freedom of Foods). He noted that no general valid rule on food can be derived from the Bible and that to transgress such a rule is not a sin. The event, which came to be referred to as the Affair of the Sausages, is considered to be the start of the Reformation in Switzerland.

Even before the publication of this treatise, the diocese of Constance reacted by sending a delegation to Zurich. The city council condemned the fasting violation, but assumed responsibility over ecclesiastical matters and requested the religious authorities clarify the issue. The bishop responded on 24 May by admonishing the Grossmünster and city council and repeating the traditional position.

Following this event, Zwingli and other humanist friends petitioned the bishop on 2 July to abolish the requirement of celibacy on the clergy. Two weeks later the petition was reprinted for the public in German as Eine freundliche Bitte und Ermahnung an die Eidgenossen (A Friendly Petition and Admonition to the Confederates). The issue was not just an abstract problem for Zwingli, as he had secretly married a widow, Anna Reinhart, earlier in the year. Their cohabitation was well-known and their public wedding took place on 2 April 1524, three months before the birth of their first child. They would have four children: Regula, William, Huldrych, and Anna. As the petition was addressed to the secular authorities, the bishop responded at the same level by notifying the Zurich government to maintain the ecclesiastical order. Other Swiss clergymen joined in Zwingli's cause which encouraged him to make his first major statement of faith, Apologeticus Archeteles (The First and Last Word). He defended himself against charges of inciting unrest and heresy. He denied the ecclesiastical hierarchy any right to judge on matters of church order because of its corrupted state.

=== Zurich disputations (1523) ===
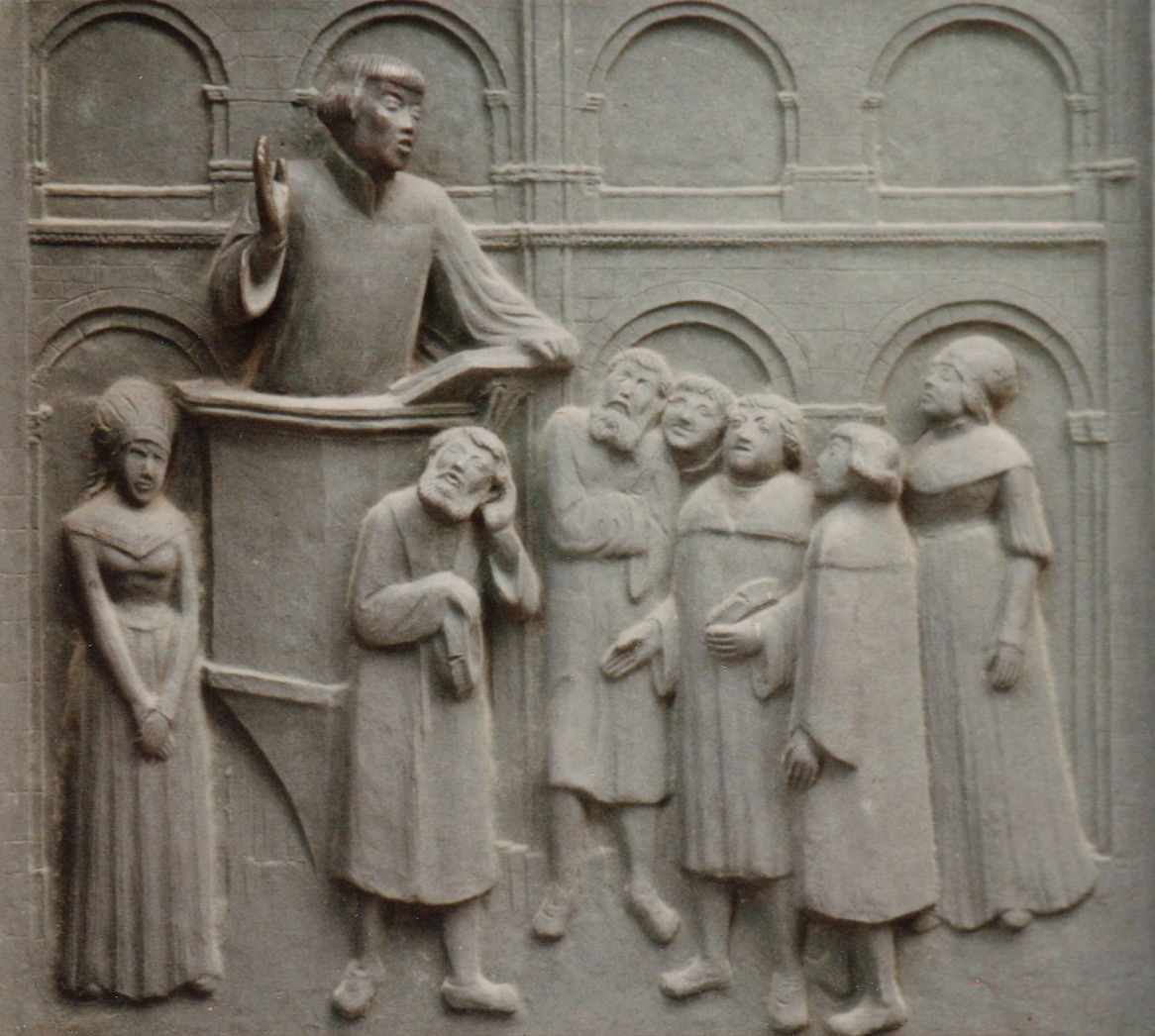
Relief of Zwingli preaching at the pulpit, Otto Münch, 1935

The events of 1522 brought no clarification on the issues. Not only did the unrest between Zurich and the bishop continue, tensions were growing among Zurich's Confederation partners in the Swiss Diet. On 22 December, the Diet recommended that its members prohibit the new teachings, a strong indictment directed at Zurich. The city council felt obliged to take the initiative and find its own solution. On 3 January 1523, the Zurich city council invited the clergy of the city and outlying region to a meeting to allow the factions to present their opinions. The bishop was invited to attend or to send a representative. The council would render a decision on who would be allowed to continue to proclaim their views. This meeting, the first Zurich disputation, took place on 29 January 1523.

The meeting attracted a large crowd of approximately six hundred participants. The bishop sent a delegation led by his vicar general, Johannes Fabri. Zwingli summarised his position in the Schlussreden (Concluding Statements or the Sixty-seven Articles). Fabri, who had not envisaged an academic disputation in the manner Zwingli had prepared for, was forbidden to discuss high theology before laymen, and simply insisted on the necessity of the ecclesiastical authority. The decision of the council was that Zwingli would be allowed to continue his preaching and that all other preachers should teach only in accordance with Scripture.

In September 1523, Leo Jud, Zwingli's closest friend and colleague and pastor of St Peterskirche, publicly called for the removal of statues of saints and other icons. This led to demonstrations and iconoclastic activities. The city council decided to work out the matter of images in a second disputation. The essence of the Mass and its sacrificial character was also included as a subject of discussion. Supporters of the Mass claimed that the Eucharist was a true sacrifice, while Zwingli claimed that it was a commemorative meal. As in the first disputation, an invitation was sent out to the Zurich clergy and the bishop of Constance. This time, however, the lay people of Zurich, the dioceses of Chur and Basel, the University of Basel, and the twelve members of the Confederation were also invited. About nine hundred persons attended this meeting, but neither the bishop nor the Confederation sent representatives. The disputation started on 26 October 1523 and lasted two days.

Zwingli again took the lead in the disputation and his opponent was the canon mentioned above, Konrad Hofmann, who had initially supported Zwingli's election. Also taking part was a radical wing of the Reformation who demanded much faster action. This group was led by Conrad Grebel who would eventually found the Anabaptist movement, a group that placed particular importance on adult baptisms and the rejection of infant baptism. During the first three days, although the controversy of images and the mass were discussed, the arguments led to the question of whether the city council or the ecclesiastical government had the authority to decide on these issues. At this point, Konrad Schmid, a priest from Aargau and follower of Zwingli, made a pragmatic suggestion. As images were not yet considered to be valueless by everyone, he suggested that pastors preach on this subject under threat of punishment. He believed the opinions of the people would gradually change and the voluntary removal of images would follow. Hence, Schmid rejected the radicals and their iconoclasm, but supported Zwingli's position. In November the council passed ordinances in support of Schmid's motion. Zwingli wrote a booklet on the evangelical duties of a minister, Kurze, christliche Einleitung (Short Christian Introduction), and the council sent it out to the clergy and the members of the Confederation.

=== Reformation progresses in Zurich (1524–1525) ===
Huldrych Zwingli was a major figure in the Swiss Reformation, advocating for the authority of scripture and the rejection of religious practices not supported by the Bible. His preaching and teachings helped spread Reformation ideas beyond Switzerland and influenced the development of Protestantism throughout Europe.

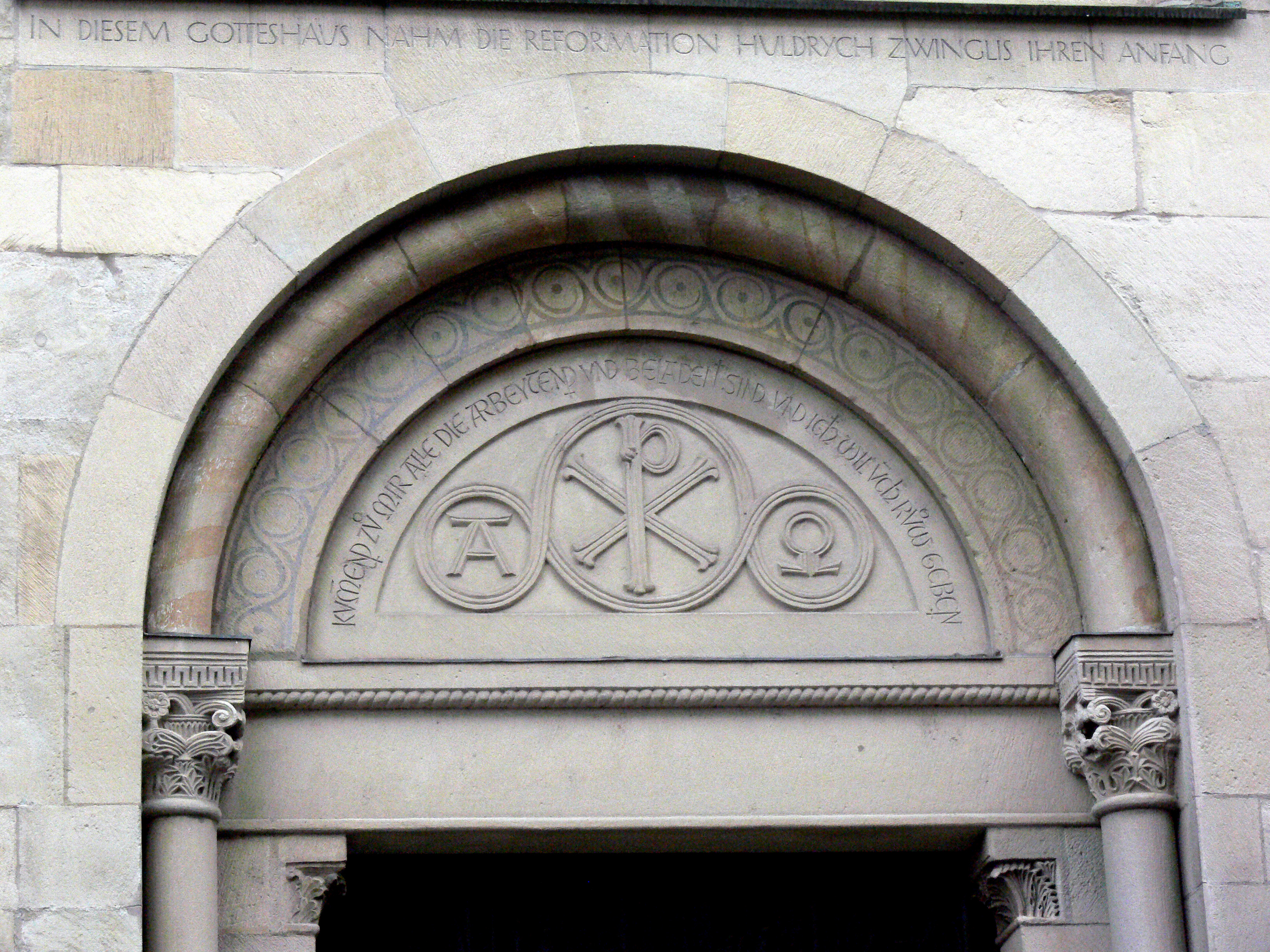
Above the entrance to the Grossmünster doors is inscribed Matthew 11:28, "Come to me, all who labor and are heavy laden, and I will give you rest."

In December 1523, the council set a deadline of Pentecost in 1524 for a solution to the elimination of the Mass and images. Zwingli gave a formal opinion in Vorschlag wegen der Bilder und der Messe (Proposal Concerning Images and the Mass). He did not urge an immediate, general abolition. The council decided on the orderly removal of images within Zurich, but rural congregations were granted the right to remove them based on majority vote. The decision on the Mass was postponed.

Evidence of the effect of the Reformation was seen in early 1524. Candlemas was not celebrated, processions of robed clergy ceased, worshippers did not go with palms or relics on Palm Sunday to the Lindenhof, and triptychs remained covered and closed after Lent. Opposition to the changes came from Konrad Hofmann and his followers, but the council decided in favour of keeping the government mandates. When Hofmann left the city, opposition from pastors hostile to the Reformation broke down. The bishop of Constance tried to intervene in defending the Mass and the veneration of images. Zwingli wrote an official response for the council and the result was the severance of all ties between the city and the diocese.

Although the council had hesitated in abolishing the Mass, the decrease in the exercise of traditional piety allowed pastors to be unofficially released from the requirement of celebrating Mass. As individual pastors altered their practices as each saw fit, Zwingli was prompted to address this disorganised situation by designing a communion liturgy in the German language. This was published in Aktion oder Brauch des Nachtmahls (Act or Custom of the Supper). Shortly before Easter, Zwingli and his closest associates requested the council to cancel the Mass and to introduce the new public order of worship. On Maundy Thursday, 13 April 1525, Zwingli celebrated communion under his new liturgy. Wooden cups and plates were used to avoid any outward displays of formality. The congregation sat at set tables to emphasise the meal aspect of the sacrament. The sermon was the focal point of the service and there was no organ music or singing. The importance of the sermon in the worship service was underlined by Zwingli's proposal to limit the celebration of communion to four times a year.

For some time Zwingli had accused mendicant orders of hypocrisy and demanded their abolition in order to support the truly poor. He suggested the monasteries be changed into hospitals and welfare institutions and incorporate their wealth into a welfare fund. This was done by reorganising the foundations of the Grossmünster and Fraumünster and pensioning off remaining nuns and monks. The council secularised the church properties (Fraumünster handed over to the city of Zurich by Zwingli's acquaintance Katharina von Zimmern in 1524) and established new welfare programs for the poor.

Zwingli requested permission to establish a Latin school, the Prophezei (Prophecy) or Carolinum, at the Grossmünster. The council agreed and it was officially opened on 19 June 1525 with Zwingli and Jud as teachers. It served to retrain and re-educate the clergy. The Zurich Bible translation, traditionally attributed to Zwingli and printed by Christoph Froschauer, bears the mark of teamwork from the Prophecy school. Scholars have not yet attempted to clarify Zwingli's share of the work based on external and stylistic evidence.

=== Conflict with the Anabaptists (1525–1527) ===
Shortly after the second Zurich disputation, many in the radical wing of the Reformation became convinced that Zwingli was making too many concessions to the Zurich council. They rejected the role of civil government and demanded the immediate establishment of a congregation of the faithful. Conrad Grebel, the leader of the radicals and the emerging Anabaptist movement, spoke disparagingly of Zwingli in private. The Anabaptists in Zurich believed Zwingli's conception of the Reformed faith and the church conflicted their teachings and attempted to claim legislation of Zwingli's early teachings. On 15 August 1524, the council insisted on the obligation to baptise all newborn infants. Zwingli secretly conferred with Grebel's group and late in 1524, the council called for official discussions. When talks were broken off, Zwingli published Wer Ursache gebe zu Aufruhr (Whoever Causes Unrest) clarifying the opposing points of view. On 17 January 1525, a public debate was held, and the council decided in favour of Zwingli. Anyone refusing to have their children baptised was required to leave Zurich. The radicals ignored these measures and on 21 January, they met at the house of the mother of another radical leader, Felix Manz. Grebel and a third leader, George Blaurock, performed the first recorded Anabaptist adult baptisms.

On 2 February, the council repeated the requirement on the baptism of all babies and some who failed to comply were arrested and fined, Manz and Blaurock among them. Zwingli and Jud interviewed them and more debates were held before the Zurich council. Meanwhile, the new teachings continued to spread to other parts of the Confederation as well as a number of Swabian towns. On 6–8 November, the last debate on the subject of baptism took place in the Grossmünster. Grebel, Manz, and Blaurock defended their cause before Zwingli, Jud, and other reformers. There was no serious exchange of views as each side would not move from their positions and the debates degenerated into an uproar, each side shouting abuse at the other.

The Zurich council decided that no compromise was possible. On 7 March 1526, it released the notorious mandate that no one shall rebaptise another under the penalty of death. Although Zwingli, technically, had nothing to do with the mandate, there is no indication that he disapproved. Felix Manz, who had sworn to leave Zurich and not to baptise any more, had deliberately returned and continued the practice. After he was arrested and tried, he was executed on 5 January 1527 by being drowned in the Limmat. He was the first Anabaptist martyr; three more were to follow, after which all others either fled or were expelled from Zurich.

=== Reformation in the Confederation (1526–1528) ===
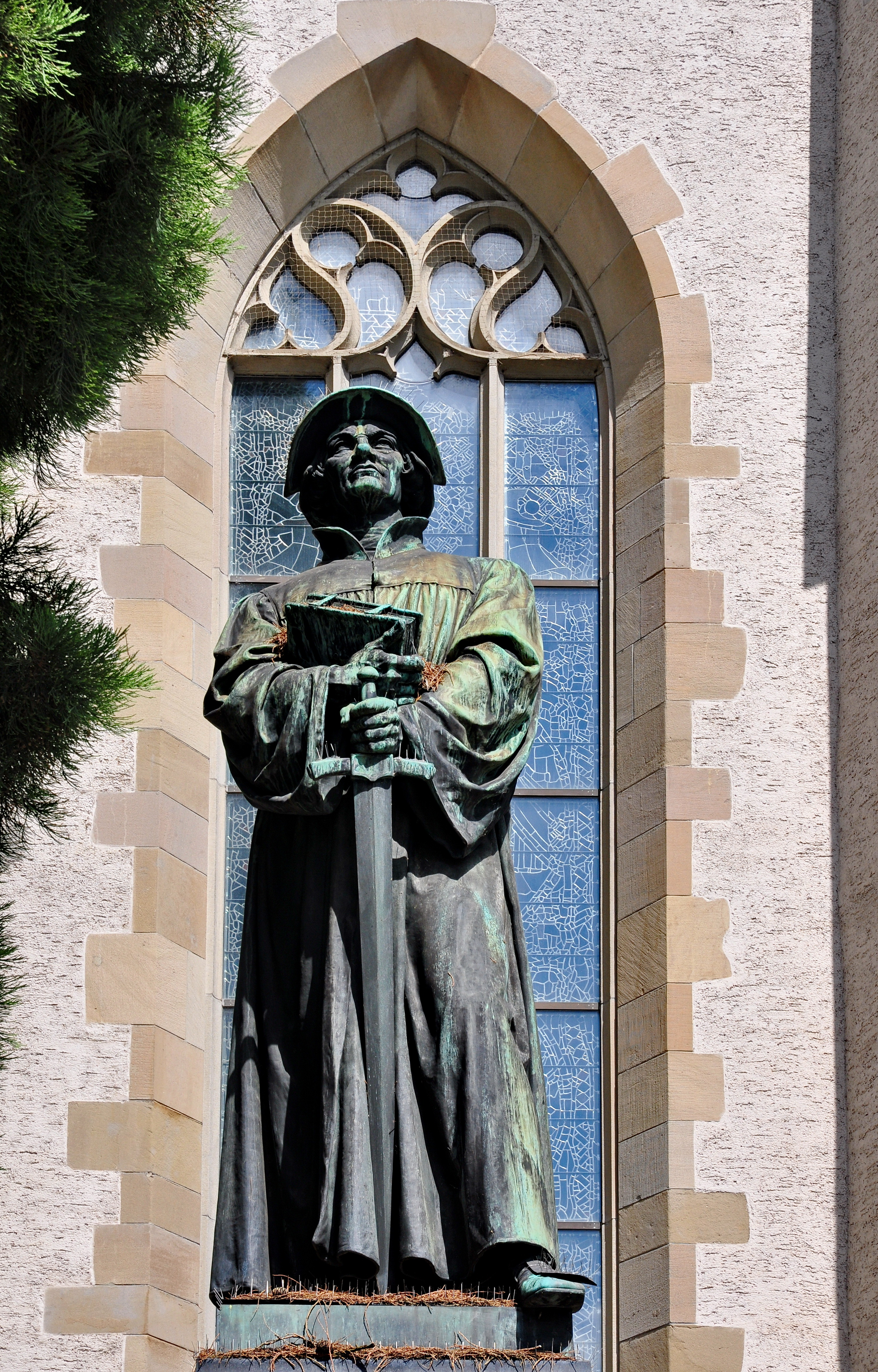
Statue of Zwingli in front of the Wasserkirche church in Zurich

On 8 April 1524, five cantons—Lucerne, Uri, Schwyz, Unterwalden, and Zug—formed an alliance, die fünf Orte (the Five States), to defend themselves from Zwingli's Reformation. They contacted the opponents of Martin Luther including John Eck, who had debated Luther in the Leipzig Disputation of 1519. Eck offered to dispute Zwingli and he accepted. However, they could not agree on the selection of the judging authority, the location of the debate, and the use of the Swiss Diet as a court. Because of the disagreements, Zwingli decided to boycott the disputation. On 19 May 1526, all the cantons sent delegates to Baden. Although Zurich's representatives were present, they did not participate in the sessions. Eck led the Catholic party while the reformers were represented by Johannes Oecolampadius of Basel, a theologian from Württemberg who had carried on an extensive and friendly correspondence with Zwingli. While the debate proceeded, Zwingli was kept informed of the proceedings and printed pamphlets giving his opinions. It was of little use as the Diet decided against Zwingli. He was to be banned and his writings were no longer to be distributed. Of the thirteen Confederation members, Glarus, Solothurn, Fribourg, and Appenzell as well as the Five States voted against Zwingli. Bern, Basel, Schaffhausen, and Zurich supported him.

The Baden disputation exposed a deep rift in the Confederation on matters of religion. The Reformation was now emerging in other states. The city of St Gallen, an affiliated state to the Confederation, was led by a reformed mayor, Joachim Vadian, and the city abolished the mass in 1527, just two years after Zurich. In Basel, although Zwingli had a close relationship with Oecolampadius, the government did not officially sanction any reformatory changes until 1 April 1529 when the mass was prohibited. Schaffhausen, which had closely followed Zurich's example, formally adopted the Reformation in September 1529.

In the case of Bern, Berchtold Haller, the priest at St Vincent Münster, and Niklaus Manuel, the poet, painter, and politician, had campaigned for the reformed cause. But it was only after another disputation that Bern counted itself as a canton of the Reformation. Three hundred and fifty persons participated, including pastors from Bern and other cantons as well as theologians from outside the Confederation such as Martin Bucer and Wolfgang Capito from Strasbourg, Ambrosius Blarer from Constance, and Andreas Althamer from Nuremberg. Eck and Fabri refused to attend and the Catholic cantons did not send representatives. The meeting started on 6 January 1528 and lasted nearly three weeks. Zwingli assumed the main burden of defending the Reformation and he preached twice in the Münster. On 7 February 1528 the council decreed that the Reformation be established in Bern.

=== First Kappel War (1529) ===
Even before the Bern Disputation, Zwingli was canvassing for an alliance of reformed cities. Once Bern officially accepted the Reformation, a new alliance, das Christliche Burgrecht (the Christian Civic Union) was created. The first meetings were held in Bern between representatives of Bern, Constance, and Zurich on 5–6 January 1528. Other cities, including Basel, Biel, Mülhausen, Schaffhausen, and St Gallen, eventually joined the alliance. The Five (Catholic) States felt encircled and isolated, so they searched for outside allies. After two months of negotiations, the Five States formed die Christliche Vereinigung (the Christian Alliance) with Ferdinand of Austria on 22 April 1529.

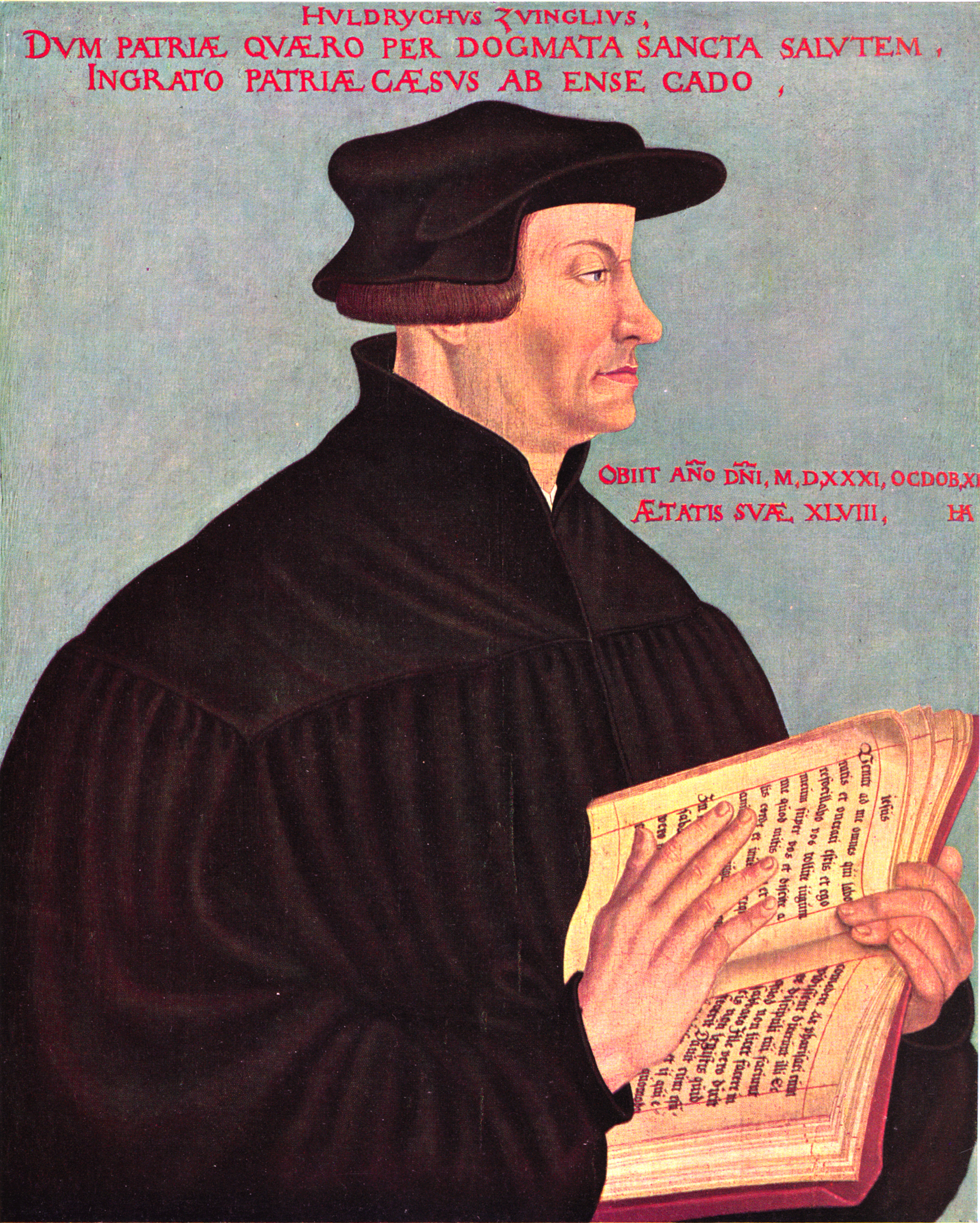
1549 painting by Hans Asper

Soon after the Austrian treaty was signed, a reformed preacher, Jacob Kaiser, was captured in Uznach and executed in Schwyz. This triggered a strong reaction from Zwingli; he drafted Ratschlag über den Krieg (Advice About the War) for the government. He outlined justifications for an attack on the Catholic states and other measures to be taken. Before Zurich could implement his plans, a delegation from Bern that included Niklaus Manuel arrived in Zurich. The delegation called on Zurich to settle the matter peacefully. Manuel added that an attack would expose Bern to further dangers as Catholic Valais and the Duchy of Savoy bordered its southern flank. He then noted, "You cannot really bring faith by means of spears and halberds." Zurich, however, decided that it would act alone, knowing that Bern would be obliged to acquiesce. War was declared on 8 June 1529. Zurich was able to raise an army of 30,000 men. The Five States were abandoned by Austria and could raise only 9,000 men. The two forces met near Kappel, but war was averted due to the intervention of Hans Aebli, a relative of Zwingli, who pleaded for an armistice.

Zwingli was obliged to state the terms of the armistice. He demanded the dissolution of the Christian Alliance; unhindered preaching by reformers in the Catholic states; prohibition of the pension system; payment of war reparations; and compensation to the children of Jacob Kaiser. Manuel was involved in the negotiations. Bern was not prepared to insist on the unhindered preaching or the prohibition of the pension system. Zurich and Bern could not agree and the Five (Catholic) States pledged only to dissolve their alliance with Austria. This was a bitter disappointment for Zwingli and it marked his decline in political influence. The first Land Peace of Kappel, der erste Landfriede, ended the war on 24 June.

=== Marburg Colloquy (1529) ===
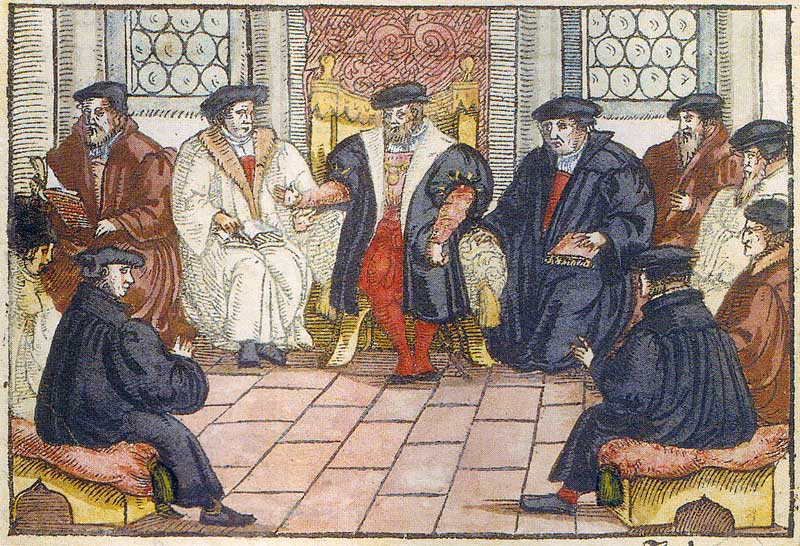
Coloured woodcut of the Marburg Colloquy, anonymous, 1557

While Zwingli carried on the political work of the Swiss Reformation, he developed his theological views with his colleagues. The famous disagreement between Luther and Zwingli on the interpretation of the eucharist originated when Andreas Karlstadt, Luther's former colleague from Wittenberg, published three pamphlets on the Lord's Supper in which Karlstadt rejected the idea of a real presence in the elements. These pamphlets, published in Basel in 1524, received the approval of Oecolampadius and Zwingli. Luther rejected Karlstadt's arguments and considered Zwingli primarily to be a partisan of Karlstadt. Zwingli began to express his thoughts on the eucharist in several publications including de Eucharistia (On the Eucharist). He attacked the idea of the real presence and argued that the word is in the words of the institution—"This is my body, this is my blood"—means signifies. Hence, the words are understood as a metaphor and Zwingli claimed that there was no real presence during the eucharist. In effect, the meal was symbolic of the Last Supper.

By spring 1527, Luther reacted strongly to Zwingli's views in the treatise Dass Diese Worte Christi "Das ist mein Leib etc." noch fest stehen wider die Schwarmgeister (That These Words of Christ "This is My Body etc." Still Stand Firm Against the Fanatics). The controversy continued until 1528 when efforts to build bridges between the Lutheran and the Zwinglian views began. Martin Bucer tried to mediate while Philip of Hesse, who wanted to form a political coalition of all Protestant forces, invited the two parties to Marburg to discuss their differences. This event became known as the Marburg Colloquy.

Zwingli accepted Philip's invitation fully believing that he would be able to convince Luther. In contrast, Luther did not expect anything to come out of the meeting and had to be urged by Philip to attend. Zwingli, accompanied by Oecolampadius, arrived on 28 September 1529, with Luther and Philipp Melanchthon arriving shortly thereafter. Other theologians also participated including Martin Bucer, Andreas Osiander, Johannes Brenz, and Justus Jonas.

The debates were held from 1–4 October and the results were published in the fifteen Marburg Articles. The participants were able to agree on fourteen of the articles, but the fifteenth article established the differences in their views on the presence of Christ in the eucharist. Professor George summarized the incompatible views, "On this issue, they parted without having reached an agreement. Both Luther and Zwingli agreed that the bread in the Supper was a sign. For Luther, however, that which the bread signified, namely the body of Christ, was present "in, with, and under" the sign itself. For Zwingli, though, sign and thing signified were separated by a distance—the width between heaven and earth."

"Luther claimed that the body of Christ was not eaten in a gross, material way but rather in some mysterious way, which is beyond human understanding. Yet, Zwingli replied, if the words were taken in their literal sense, the body had to be eaten in the most grossly material way. "For this is the meaning they carry: this bread is that body of mine which is given for you. It was given for us in grossly material form, subject to wounds, blows and death. As such, therefore, it must be the material of the supper." Indeed, to press the literal meaning of the text even farther, it follows that Christ would have again to suffer pain, as his body was broken again—this time by the teeth of communicants. Even more absurdly, Christ's body would have to be swallowed, digested, even eliminated through the bowels! Such thoughts were repulsive to Zwingli. They smacked of cannibalism on the one hand and of the pagan mystery religions on the other. The main issue for Zwingli, however, was not the irrationality or exegetical fallacy of Luther's views. It was rather that Luther put "the chief point of salvation in physically eating the body of Christ," for he connected it with the forgiveness of sins. The same motive that had moved Zwingli so strongly to oppose images, the invocation of saints, and baptismal regeneration was present also in the struggle over the Supper: the fear of idolatry. Salvation was by Christ alone, through faith alone, not through faith and bread. The object of faith was that which is not seen (Heb 11:1) and which therefore cannot be eaten except, again, in a nonliteral, figurative sense. "Credere est edere," said Zwingli: "To believe is to eat." To eat the body and to drink the blood of Christ in the Supper, then, simply meant to have the body and blood of Christ present in the mind."

The failure to find agreement resulted in strong emotions on both sides. "When the two sides departed, Zwingli cried out in tears, "There are no people on earth with whom I would rather be at one than the [Lutheran] Wittenbergers.""

Due to these differences, Luther initially refused to acknowledge Zwingli and his followers as Christians.

=== Politics, confessions, the Kappel Wars and death (1529–1531) ===
The Battle of Kappel, 11 October 1531, from Chronik by Johannes Stumpf, 1548

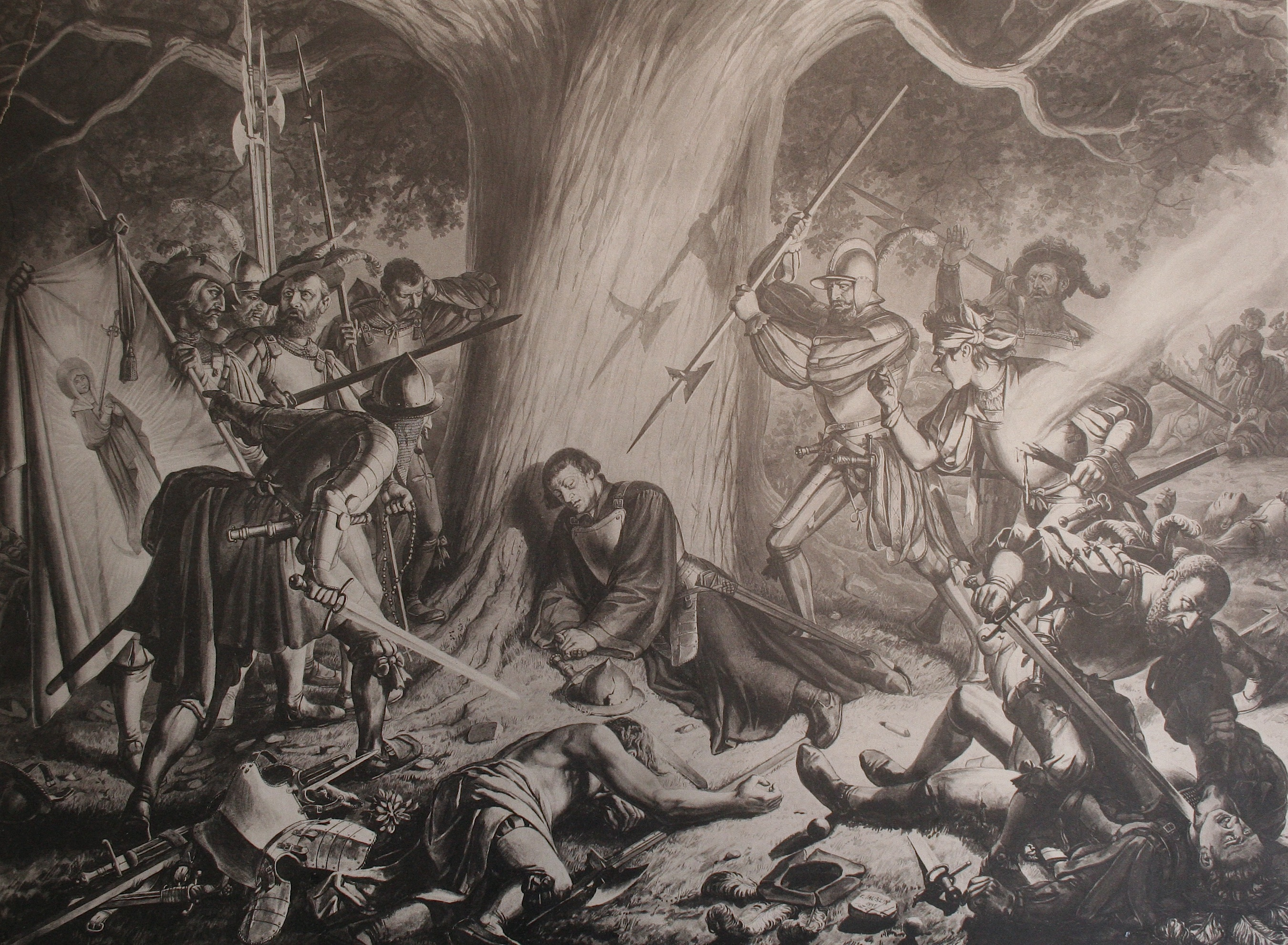
The murder of Zwingli, by Karl Jauslin (1842–1904).

With the failure of the Marburg Colloquy and the split of the Confederation, Zwingli set his goal on an alliance with Philip of Hesse. He kept up a lively correspondence with Philip. Bern refused to participate, but after a long process, Zurich, Basel, and Strasbourg signed a mutual defence treaty with Philip in November 1530. Zwingli also personally negotiated with France's diplomatic representative, but the two sides were too far apart. France wanted to maintain good relations with the Five States. Approaches to Venice and Milan also failed.

As Zwingli was working on establishing these political alliances, Charles V, the Holy Roman Emperor, invited Protestants to the Augsburg Diet to present their views so that he could make a verdict on the issue of faith. The Lutherans presented the Augsburg Confession. Under the leadership of Martin Bucer, the cities of Strasbourg, Constance, Memmingen, and Lindau produced the Tetrapolitan Confession. This document attempted to take a middle position between the Lutherans and Zwinglians.

It was too late for the Burgrecht cities to produce a confession of their own. Zwingli then produced his own private confession, Fidei ratio (Account of Faith) in which he explained his faith in twelve articles conforming to the articles of the Apostles' Creed. The tone was strongly anti-Catholic as well as anti-Lutheran. The Lutherans did not react officially, but criticised it privately. Zwingli's and Luther's old opponent, Johann Eck, counter-attacked with a publication, Refutation of the Articles Zwingli Submitted to the Emperor.

When Philip of Hesse formed the Schmalkaldic League at the end of 1530, the four cities of the Tetrapolitan Confession joined on the basis of a Lutheran interpretation of that confession. Given the flexibility of the league's entrance requirements, Zurich, Basel, and Bern also considered joining. However, Zwingli could not reconcile the Tetrapolitan Confession with his own beliefs and wrote a harsh refusal to Bucer and Capito. This offended Philip to the point where relations with the League were severed. The Burgrecht cities now had no external allies to help deal with internal Confederation religious conflicts.

The peace treaty of the First Kappel War did not define the right of unhindered preaching in the Catholic states. Zwingli interpreted this to mean that preaching should be permitted, but the Five States suppressed any attempts to reform. The Burgrecht cities considered different means of applying pressure to the Five States. Basel and Schaffhausen preferred quiet diplomacy while Zurich wanted armed conflict. Zwingli and Jud unequivocally advocated an attack on the Five States. Bern took a middle position which eventually prevailed. In May 1531, Zurich reluctantly agreed to impose a food blockade. It failed to have any effect and in October, Bern decided to withdraw the blockade. Zurich urged its continuation and the Burgrecht cities began to quarrel among themselves.

On 9 October 1531, in a surprise move, the Five States declared war on Zurich. Zurich's mobilisation was slow due to internal squabbling and, on 11 October, 3500 poorly deployed men encountered a Five States force nearly double their size near Kappel. Many pastors, including Zwingli, were among the soldiers. The battle lasted less than one hour and Zwingli was among the 500 casualties in the Zurich army.

Zwingli had considered himself first and foremost a soldier of Christ; second a defender of his country, the Confederation; and third a leader of his city, Zurich, where he had lived for the previous twelve years. He died at the age of 47.

In Tabletalk, Luther is recorded saying: "They say that Zwingli recently died thus; if his error had prevailed, we would have perished, and our church with us. It was a judgment of God. That was always a proud people. The others, the papists, will probably also be dealt with by our Lord God."

Erasmus wrote, "We are freed from great fear by the death of the two preachers, Zwingli and Oecolampadius, whose fate has wrought an incredible change in the mind of many. This is the wonderful hand of God on high." Oecolampadius had died on 24 November. Erasmus also wrote, "If Bellona had favoured them, it would have been all over with us."

== Theology ==
According to Zwingli, the cornerstone of theology is the Bible. Zwingli appealed to scripture constantly in his writings. He placed its authority above other sources such as the ecumenical councils or the Church Fathers, although he did not hesitate to use other sources to support his arguments. The principles that guide Zwingli's interpretations are derived from his rationalist humanist education and his Reformed understanding of the Bible. He rejected literalist interpretations of a passage, such as those of the Anabaptists, and used synecdoche and analogies, methods he describes in A Friendly Exegesis (1527). Two analogies that he used quite effectively were between Baptism and circumcision and between the Eucharist and Passover.

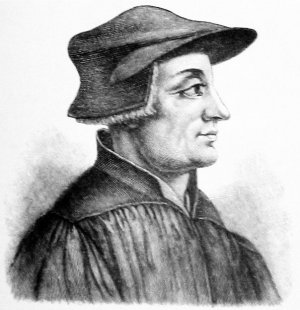
A rendition of Huldrych Zwingli from the 1906 edition of the Meyers Konversations-Lexikon

Zwingli rejected the word sacrament in the popular usage of his time. For ordinary people, the word meant some kind of holy action of which there is inherent power to free the conscience from sin. For Zwingli, a sacrament was an initiatory ceremony or a pledge, pointing out that the word was derived from sacramentum meaning an oath. (However, the word is also translated "mystery".) In his early writings on baptism, he noted that baptism was an example of such a pledge. He challenged Catholics by accusing them of superstition when they ascribed the water of baptism a certain power to wash away sin. Later, in his conflict with the Anabaptists, he defended the practice of infant baptism, noting that there is no law forbidding the practice. He argued that baptism was a sign of a covenant with God, thereby replacing circumcision in the Old Testament.

Zwingli approached the Eucharist in a similar manner to baptism. During the first Zurich disputation in 1523, he denied that an actual sacrifice occurred during the Mass, arguing that Christ made the sacrifice only once and for all eternity. Hence, the Eucharist was "a memorial of the sacrifice". Following this argument, he further developed his view, coming to the conclusion of the "signifies" interpretation for the words of the institution. He used various passages of scripture to argue against transubstantiation as well as Luther's views, the key text being John 6:63, "It is the Spirit who gives life, the flesh is of no avail". Zwingli's approach and interpretation of scripture to understand the meaning of the eucharist was one reason he could not reach a consensus with Luther.

The impact of Luther on Zwingli's theological development has long been a source of interest and discussion among Lutheran scholars, who seek to firmly establish Luther as the first Reformer. Zwingli himself asserted vigorously his independence of Luther and the most recent studies have lent credibility to this claim. Zwingli appears to have read Luther's books in search of confirmation from Luther for his own views. He agreed with the stand Luther took against the pope. Like Luther, Zwingli was also a student and admirer of Augustine. His later writings continued to show characteristic differences from Luther such as the inclusion of non-Christians in heaven as described in An Exposition of the Faith.

== Music ==
Zwingli enjoyed music and could play several instruments, including the violin, harp, flute, dulcimer and hunting horn. He would sometimes amuse the children of his congregation on his lute and was so well known for his playing that his enemies mocked him as "the evangelical lute-player and fifer." Three of Zwingli's Lieder or hymns have been preserved: the Pestlied mentioned above, an adaptation of Psalm 65 (c. 1525), and the Kappeler Lied, which is believed to have been composed during the campaign of the first war of Kappel (1529). These songs were not meant to be sung during worship services and are not identified as hymns of the Reformation, though they were published in some 16th-century hymnals.

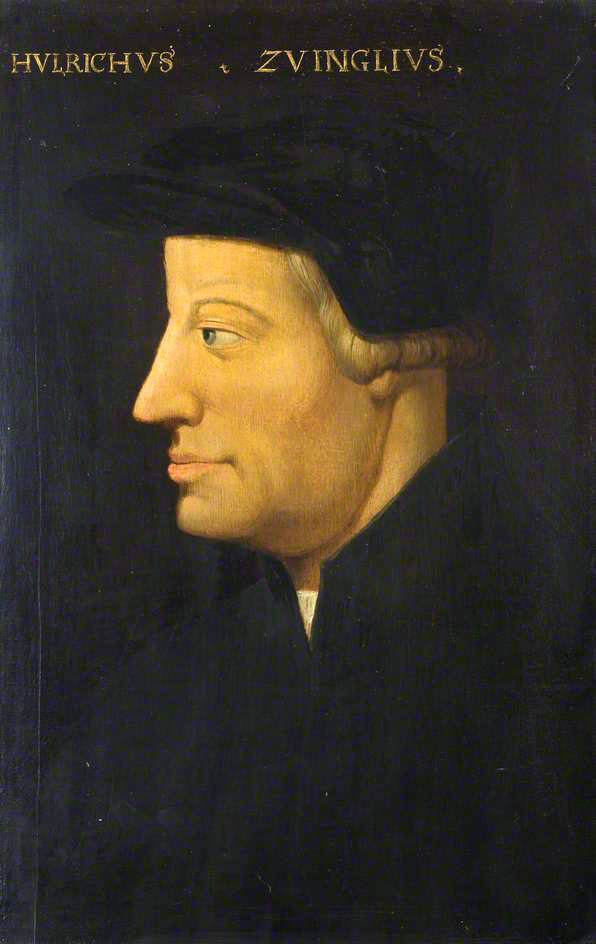
Painting of Zwingli by Hans Asper

Zwingli criticized the practice of priestly chanting and monastic choirs. The criticism dates from 1523 when he attacked certain worship practices. His arguments are detailed in the Conclusions of 1525, in which, Conclusions 44, 45 and 46 are concerned with musical practices under the rubric of "prayer". He associated music with images and vestments, all of which he felt diverted people's attention from true spiritual worship. It is not known what he thought of the musical practices in early Lutheran churches. Zwingli, however, eliminated instrumental music from worship in the church, stating that God had not commanded it in worship. The organist of the People's Church in Zurich is recorded as weeping upon seeing the great organ broken up. Although Zwingli did not express an opinion on congregational singing, he made no effort to encourage it. Nevertheless, scholars have found that Zwingli was supportive of a role for music in the church. Gottfried W. Locher writes, "The old assertion 'Zwingli was against church singing' holds good no longer ... Zwingli's polemic is concerned exclusively with the medieval Latin choral and priestly chanting and not with the hymns of evangelical congregations or choirs". Locher goes on to say that "Zwingli freely allowed vernacular psalm or choral singing. In addition, he even seems to have striven for lively, antiphonal, unison recitative". Locher then summarizes his comments on Zwingli's view of church music as follows: "The chief thought in his conception of worship was always 'conscious attendance and understanding'—'devotion', yet with the lively participation of all concerned".

== Legacy ==
Zwingli was a humanist and a scholar with many devoted friends and disciples. He communicated as easily with the ordinary people of his congregation as with rulers such as Philip of Hesse. His reputation as a stern, stolid reformer is counterbalanced by the fact that he had an excellent sense of humour and used satiric fables, spoofing, and puns in his writings. Zwingli remains as a complex figure of the early Reformation's history, with many drawing comparisons between him and other characters like Martin Luther. He was more conscious of social obligations than was Luther, and he genuinely believed that the masses would accept a government guided by God's word. He tirelessly promoted assistance to the poor, who he believed should be cared for by a truly Christian community.

In December 1531 the Zurich council selected Heinrich Bullinger as Zwingli's successor. Bullinger immediately removed any doubts about Zwingli's orthodoxy and defended him as a prophet and a martyr. During Bullinger's ascendancy, the confessional divisions of the Swiss Confederation stabilised. Bullinger rallied the reformed cities and cantons and helped them to recover from the defeat at Kappel. Zwingli had instituted fundamental reforms; Bullinger consolidated and refined them.

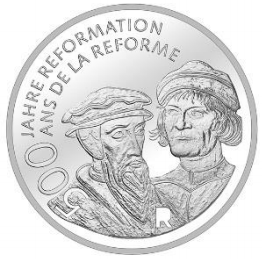
Zwingli (right) and John Calvin on a Swiss 20 franc coin commemorating the 500th anniversary of the Reformation, 2017.

Scholars have found it difficult to assess Zwingli's impact on history, for several reasons. There is no consensus on the definition of "Zwinglianism"; by any definition, Zwinglianism evolved under his successor, Heinrich Bullinger; and research into Zwingli's influence on Bullinger and John Calvin remains rudimentary. Bullinger adopted most of Zwingli's points of doctrine. Like Zwingli, he summarised his theology several times, the best-known example being the Second Helvetic Confession of 1566. Meanwhile, Calvin had taken over the Reformation in Geneva. Calvin differed with Zwingli on the eucharist and criticised him for regarding it as simply a metaphorical event. In 1549, Bullinger and Calvin succeeded in overcoming the differences in doctrine and produced the Consensus Tigurinus (Zurich Consensus). They declared that the eucharist was not just symbolic of the meal, but they also rejected the Lutheran position that the body and blood of Christ is in union with the elements. It was John Calvin's doctrine of a real spiritual presence of Christ in the Eucharist that became the doctrine of the Reformed Churches, while Zwingli's view was rejected by the Reformed Churches (though it was adopted by other traditions, such as the Plymouth Brethren). With this rapprochement, Calvin established his role in the Swiss Reformed Churches and eventually in the wider world.

The Swiss Reformed churches count Zwingli as their founder, as does the Reformed Church in the United States (both its present liberal and conservative descendant denominations, with the former taking a historical-critical interpretation of Zwinglian theology and using it as a basis for ecumenism, and the latter interpreting his teachings as binding upon consciences and, in effect, as inerrant as Scripture itself), according to 19th-century RCUS historian J.I. Good. Scholars speculate as to why Zwinglianism has not diffused more widely, even though Zwingli's theology is considered the first expression of Reformed theology. Although his name is not widely recognised, Zwingli's legacy lives on in the basic confessions of the Reformed churches of today. He is often called, after Martin Luther and John Calvin, the "Third Man of the Reformation".

In 2019 the Swiss director Stefan Haupt released a Swiss-German film on the career of the reformer: Zwingli. It was filmed in Swiss German with French and English subtitles available.

2019 began the 500th anniversary of the Swiss Reformation with a conference at John Calvin University, and renewed interest in revisiting the life and impact of Zwingli. Examples include the film Zwingli, Bruce Gordon's book, Zwingli: God's Armed Prophet and an article by Thomas Quinn Marabello, "The 500th Anniversary of the Swiss Reformation: How Zwingli changed and continues to impact Switzerland today".

== List of works ==
Zwingli's collected works are expected to fill 21 volumes. A collection of selected works was published in 1995 by the Zwingliverein in collaboration with the Theologischer Verlag Zürich. This four-volume collection contains the following works:

- Volume 1: 1995, 512 pages, ISBN 3-290-10974-7
  - Pestlied (1519/20) "The Plague Song"
  - Die freie Wahl der Speisen (1522) "Choice and Liberty regarding Food"
  - Eine göttliche Ermahnung der Schwyzer (1522) "A Solemn Exhortation [to the people of Schwyz]"
  - Die Klarheit und Gewissheit des Wortes Gottes (1522) "The Clarity and Certainty of the Word of God"
  - Göttliche und menschliche Gerechtigkeit (1523) "Divine and Human Righteousness"
  - Wie Jugendliche aus gutem Haus zu erziehen sind (1523) "How to educate adolescents from a good home"
  - Der Hirt (1524) "The Shepherd"
  - Eine freundschaftliche und ernste Ermahnung der Eidgenossen (1524) "Zwingli's Letter to the Federation"
  - Wer Ursache zum Aufruhr gibt (1524) "Those Who Give Cause for Tumult"
- Volume 2: 1995, 556 pages, ISBN 3-290-10975-5
  - Auslegung und Begründung der Thesen oder Artikel (1523) "Interpretation and justification of the theses or articles"
- Volume 3: 1995, 519 pages, ISBN 3-290-10976-3
  - Empfehlung zur Vorbereitung auf einen möglichen Krieg (1524) "Plan for a Campaign"
  - Kommentar über die wahre und die falsche Religion (1525) "Commentary on True and False Religion"
- Volume 4: 1995, 512 pages, ISBN 3-290-10977-1
  - Antwort auf die Predigt Luthers gegen die Schwärmer (1527) "A Refutation of Luther's sermon against vain enthusiasm"
  - Die beiden Berner Predigten (1528) "The Berne sermons"
  - Rechenschaft über den Glauben (1530) "An Exposition of the Faith"
  - Die Vorsehung (1530) "Providence"
  - Erklärung des christlichen Glaubens (1531) "Explanation of the Christian faith"

The complete 21-volume edition is being undertaken by the Zwingliverein in collaboration with the Institut für schweizerische Reformationsgeschichte, and is projected to be organised as follows:

- vols. I–VI Werke: Zwingli's theological and political writings, essays, sermons etc., in chronological order. This section was completed in 1991.
- vols. VII–XI Briefe: Letters
- vol. XII Randglossen: Zwingli's glosses in the margin of books
- vols XIII ff. Exegetische Schriften: Zwingli's exegetical notes on the Bible.

Vols. XIII and XIV have been published, vols. XV and XVI are under preparation. Vols. XVII to XXI are planned to cover the New Testament.

Older German / Latin editions available online include:

- Huldreich Zwinglis sämtliche Werke, vol. 1, Corpus Reformatorum vol. 88, ed. Emil Egli. Berlin: Schwetschke, 1905.
- Analecta Reformatoria: Dokumente und Abhandlungen zur Geschichte Zwinglis und seiner Zeit, vol. 1, ed. Emil Egli. Zürich: Züricher and Furrer, 1899.
- Huldreich Zwingli's Werke, ed. Melchior Schuler and Johannes Schulthess, 1824ff.: vol. I; vol. II;vol. III; vol. IV; vol. V; vol. VI, 1; vol. VI, 2; vol. VII; vol. VIII.
- Der evangelische Glaube nach den Hauptschriften der Reformatoren, ed. Paul Wernle. Tübingen: Mohr, 1918.
- Von Freiheit der Speisen, eine Reformationsschrift, 1522, ed. Otto Walther. Halle: Niemeyer, 1900.

See also the following English translations of selected works by Zwingli:

- The Christian Education of Youth. Collegeville: Thompson Bros., 1899.
- Selected Works of Huldreich Zwingli (1484–1531). Philadelphia: University of Pennsylvania, 1901.
- The Latin Works and the Correspondence of Huldreich Zwingli, Together with Selections from his German Works.
  - Vol. 1, 1510–1522, New York: G.P. Putnam and Sons, 1912.
  - Vol. 2, Philadelphia: Heidelberg Press, 1912.
  - Vol. 3, Philadelphia: Heidelberg Press, 1912.

== See also ==
- Reformation in Zürich
- Reformed Christianity

== Bibliography ==
- Bainton, Roland H. (1995), Here I Stand: A Life of Martin Luther, New York: Meridian, ISBN 0-452-01146-9.
- Cameron, Euan (1991), The European Reformation, New York: Oxford University Press, ISBN 0-19-873093-4.
- Chadwick, Owen (2001), The Early Reformation on the Continent, Oxford: Oxford University Press, ISBN 0-19-926578-X.
- Estep, William Roscoe (1986), Renaissance and Reformation, Grand Rapids, MI: Wm. B. Eerdmans, ISBN 0-8028-0050-5.
- Furcha, E. J., ed. (1985), Huldrych Zwingli, 1484–1531: A Legacy of Radical Reform: Papers from the 1984 International Zwingli Symposium McGill University, Montreal: Faculty of Religious Studies, McGill University, ISBN 0-7717-0124-1.
- Gäbler, Ulrich (1986), Huldrych Zwingli: His Life and Work, Philadelphia: Fortress Press, ISBN 0-8006-0761-9.
- Greenslade, S. L., ed. (1975), The Cambridge History of the Bible, Cambridge: Cambridge University Press, ISBN 0-521-29016-3.
- Locher, Gottfried W. (1981), Zwingli's Thought: New Perspectives, Leiden: E.J. Brill, ISBN 90-04-06420-6.
- Old, Hughes Oliphant (1998), The Reading and Preaching of the Scriptures in the Worship of the Christian Church, Volume 4, Grand Rapids, Michigan: Wm. B. Eerdmans Publishing, ISBN 978-0-8028-4775-1.
- Potter, G. R. (1976), Zwingli, Cambridge: Cambridge University Press, ISBN 0-521-20939-0.
- Rilliet, Jean (1964), Zwingli: Third Man of the Reformation, London: Lutterworth Press, OCLC 820553.
- Steinmetz, David Curtis (2001), Reformers in the Wings: From Geiler Von Kaysersberg to Theodore Beza, Oxford: Oxford University Press, ISBN 0-19-513048-0.
- Stephens, W. P. (1986), The Theology of Huldrych Zwingli, Oxford: Clarendon Press, ISBN 0-19-826677-4.
- Stephens, W. P. (1992), Zwingli: An Introduction to His Thought, Oxford: Oxford University Press, ISBN 0-19-826363-5.
- Stephens, W. Peter (2004), "The theology of Zwingli", in Bagchi, David V. N.; Steinmetz, David Curtis (eds.), The Cambridge Companion to Reformation Theology, Cambridge: Cambridge University Press, ISBN 0-521-77662-7.
- Wandel, Lee Palmer (1990), Always Among Us: Images of the Poor in Zwingli's Zurich, Cambridge: Cambridge University Press, ISBN 0-521-52254-4.

Religious titles
New title	Antistes of Zürich; 1525–1532	Succeeded by Heinrich Bullinger
