= Gerold Meyer von Knonau (1843–1931) =

Swiss historian (1843–1931)

- Photograph by Franz Schmelhaus, c. 1914
- Born: 5 August 1843; Zurich, Switzerland
- Died: 16 March 1931 (aged 87); Zurich, Switzerland
- Occupation: Historian
- Spouse: Bertha Held
- Father: Gerold Meyer von Knonau

Gerold Meyer von Knonau (5 August 1843 – 16 March 1931) was a Swiss historian from Zurich. He was professor of medieval and modern history in Zurich from 1872 to 1920. With him, the philological-critical school, already widespread abroad, entered Switzerland. He wrote the Jahrbücher des deutschen Reiches unter Heinrich IV. und Heinrich V. (1890–1909), and from 1894 to 1921 he presided over the General Historical Research Society of Switzerland. He was the most internationally renowned Swiss historian of his time.

== Biography ==
Gerold Meyer von Knonau was born on 5 August 1843 in Zurich, the son of Gerold Meyer von Knonau. He married Bertha Held. His cousin Caroline Meyer von Knonau married his close friend from his student days, the art historian Johann Rudolf Rahn.

Meyer von Knonau studied history in Zurich, Bonn, Berlin and Göttingen, where he studied above all under Georg Waitz. He obtained his doctorate at the University of Zurich in 1866 and his Habilitation in 1867. He became associate professor (ausserordentlicher Professor) in 1870, and from 1872 to 1920 he was full professor of medieval and modern history, from 1878 also of ancient history.

With Meyer von Knonau, the philological-critical school, which was already widespread abroad, entered Switzerland. He was more an annalist than a narrator, a researcher entirely devoted to collecting mostly unknown documents. He interpreted them with logical precision and caution, always seeking to establish the exact historical facts.

As a member of the historical commission of the Bavarian Academy of Sciences, Meyer von Knonau wrote the Jahrbücher des deutschen Reiches unter Heinrich IV. und Heinrich V. (1890–1909). His view that the penance of Henry IV at Canossa, for all its humiliation, was a clever move that forced the pope to grant absolution is now generally accepted by researchers. With the support of Hermann Wartmann, he also edited the St. Gallische Geschichtsquellen (1870–1881). He displayed his almost encyclopedic knowledge in numerous articles in the Allgemeine Deutsche Biographie and in essays, studies and reviews of new publications in German and Swiss journals.

From 1871 to 1921 Meyer von Knonau presided over the Antiquarian Society of Zurich, and from 1894 to 1921 over the General Historical Research Society of Switzerland (Allgemeine Geschichtforschende Gesellschaft der Schweiz). He was the most internationally renowned Swiss historian of his time. He died in Zurich on 16 March 1931.

== Bibliography ==
- A. Largiadèr, "Gerold Meyer von Knonau", in Zeitschrift für schweizerische Geschichte 11, 1931, 206–213
- R. Feller and E. Bonjour, Geschichtsschreibung der Schweiz vom Spätmittelalter zur Neuzeit, 2, 1979, 763 f.
