= Anna Zwingli =

Zürich protestant figure

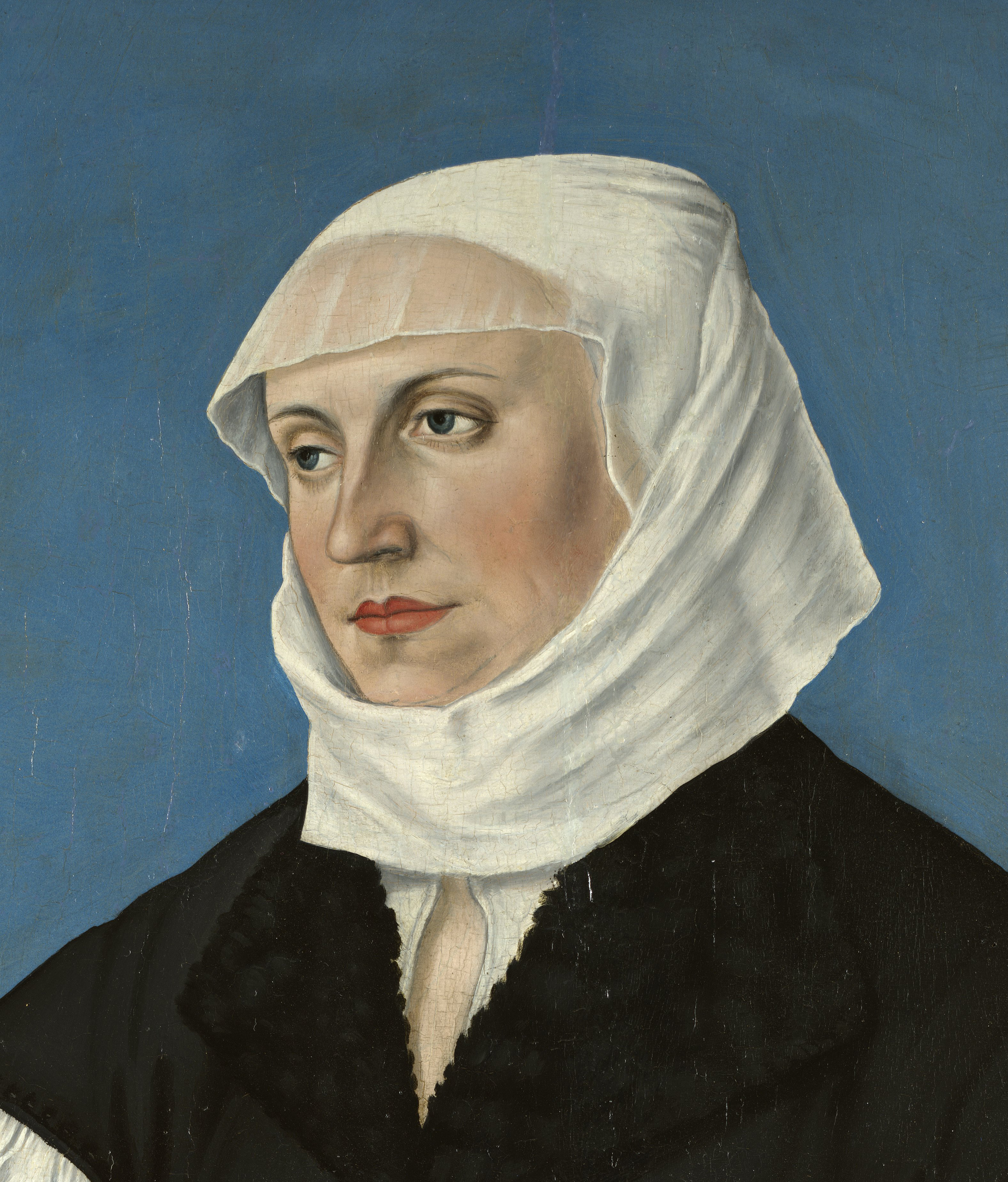
- Born: c. 1484
- Died: 16 December 1538
- Spouse(s): Hans Meyer von Knonau (died 1517) Huldrych Zwingli (m. 1524; died 1531)

Anna Zwingli, also known as Anna Reinhart, (1484 - 1538, in Zürich), was a Roman Catholic (later an important Reformed Protestant) figure from 15th-century Zürich.

After an initial marriage that ended in widowhood, she married her fellow citizen Huldrych Zwingli, and their marriage seemed relatively happy until his death in 1531. Following Zwingli's death, she took full responsibility for the family's survival. She is underrepresented in sources from the period, starting with writings from her husband.

== Biography ==
=== Underrepresentation in sources ===
Unfortunately for the understanding of the figure, the majority of known information about her comes from writings by others, primarily her husband. She is severely underrepresented in her husband's written sources compared to her role in his life; for instance, she is mentioned in only three of over three hundred preserved letters from Zwingli, which amounts to less than 1% of her husband's letters. These three mentions are brief occurrences, one of which is marked by a misogynistic tone, with Huldrych Zwingli instructing his correspondent to:

"Ask Master Stoll to tell my wife everything that it's good for a woman to know, for I left her only telling her I was going to Basel on business."

Apart from these instances, there exists one preserved letter that her husband sent to her. This absence in sources can partly be explained by the fact that Zwingli, like other thinkers at the beginning of the Reformation, expressed and defended ideas advocating for a society based on a patriarchal model.

=== Life ===
Reinhart was born in Zürich around 1484. Her parents, Oswald and Elsbethe Wynzürn, were innkeepers. She married Hans Meyer von Knonau, who died in 1517, without the consent of her husband's father. From this first marriage, she had a daughter named Marghareta Meyer and a son named Gerold von Knonau, who was protected by Huldrych Zwingli. She later remarried Zwingli himself, and they had four children, including Regula. Their marriage was initially kept secret in 1522.

The confirmation of her marriage to Huldrych Zwingli took place on 2 April 1525, at the church. Following their marriage, both she and her husband faced attacks, with accusations of her wealth and the integrity of their union being questioned. This led Zwingli to defend her in writing:

"Regarding my wife, Anna Reinhart, they spread rumors everywhere that she is wealthy; but she has not a penny beyond 400 florins besides her jewelry and clothes. Since she married me, she no longer wears silk or a ring; she dresses like the wives of ordinary artisans. The goods given to her by her children, the Meyers, are necessary for her maintenance; she is forty years old and falls ill every day; that's why I married her. They speak of her having the greatest possessions and the finest clothes; you all know that's a lie. It's easy to lie from a distance."

From the few surviving sources about her and the couple, it appears that her husband loved her and she reciprocated these feelings. This also explains why they married at a similar age, in their forties, which was rare for the time and society they lived in. Several of Zwingli's friends described her as "pious". Zwingli sent her a letter after her childbirth displaying tenderness towards her, indicating that the couple maintained good internal relations:

"Grace and peace from God. Dear wife, I thank God that He has granted you a joyful childbirth. May He grant us to raise the child according to His will. Send my cousin one or two handkerchiefs in the manner and style that you wear them. She is modest but not ostentatious, being a woman of 40 years in all things and manners, as the wife of Master Jörgen has described her. She is extremely kind towards me and all of us. For now, I commend myself to God. Send greetings for me to the steward, Vlman Trinckler, Provost Effinger, and all those dear to you. Pray to God for me and for all of us. Written in Bern, January 11. Greet all your children for me, especially Margarete; comfort her on my behalf. Huldrych Zwingli, your husband. Send me the travel cloak as soon as you can."

However, according to other interpretations, this letter does not necessarily demonstrate particular tenderness and is rather interesting because Zwingli asked her to send him his cloak, which, combined with other elements, suggests he relied on a network of women to whom he delegated some of his responsibilities. Generally, however, her husband appears to have been affectionate and gentle towards her, which aligns well with the friendly character of the person.

Her husband Zwingli and her son Gerold died during the Second Battle of Kappel in 1531, where she also lost a brother, a brother-in-law, and her son-in-law. She then took on the responsibility of supporting her family, despite being attacked, but received numerous messages of support and correspondence from across Europe.

Heinrich Bullinger, Zwingli's successor, subsequently housed her until her death.

== Legacy ==
Reinhart acquired a dual status in Protestantism; on one hand, often in older writings, she became recognized for her piety, dedication, and chastity. On the other hand, her figure was reexamined to assess Zwingli's views on women and, more importantly, to challenge some of the teachings of early Reformation thinkers in feminist theological readings.
