= Reformation in Zürich =

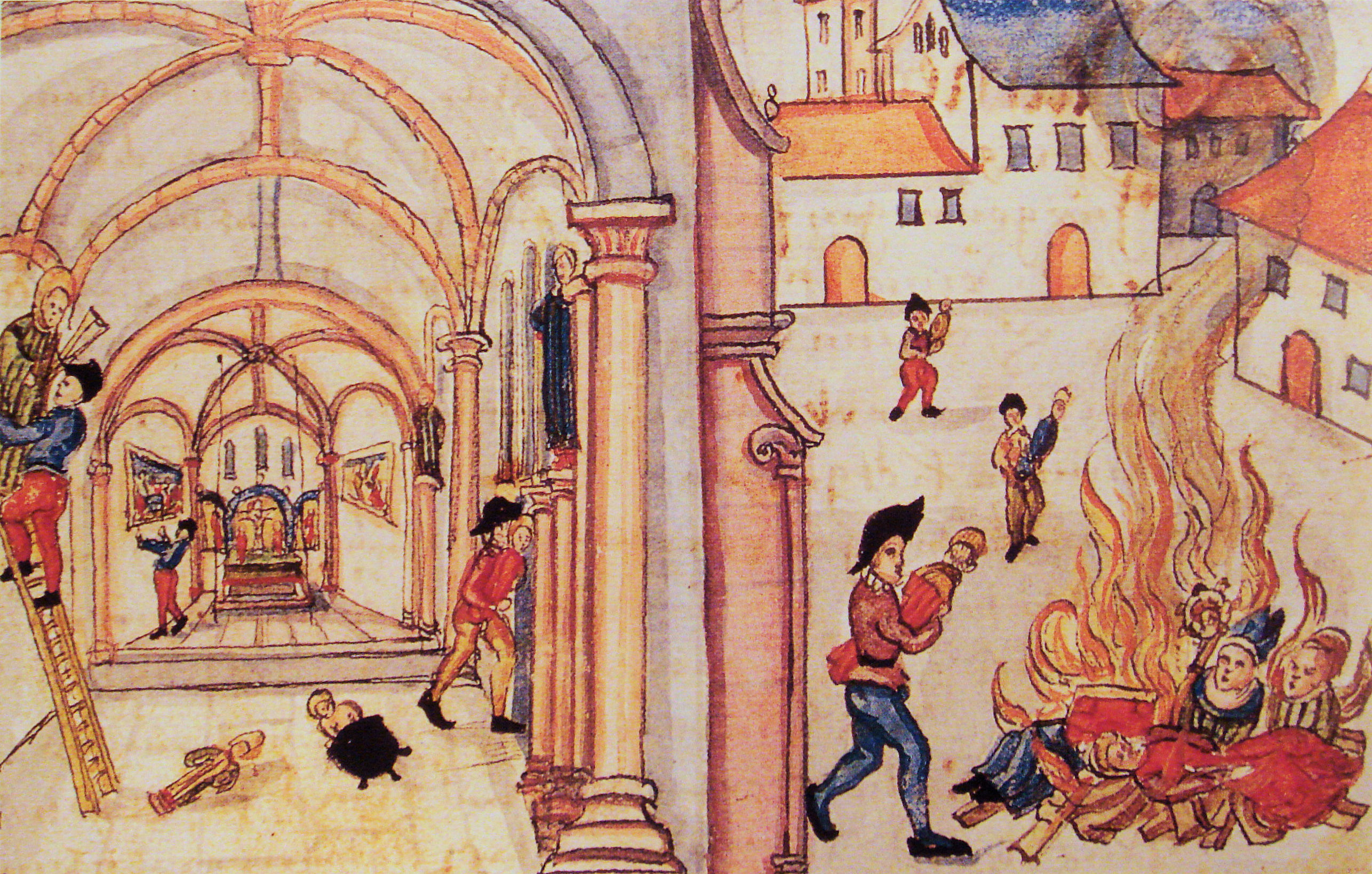
Iconoclasm in Zürich

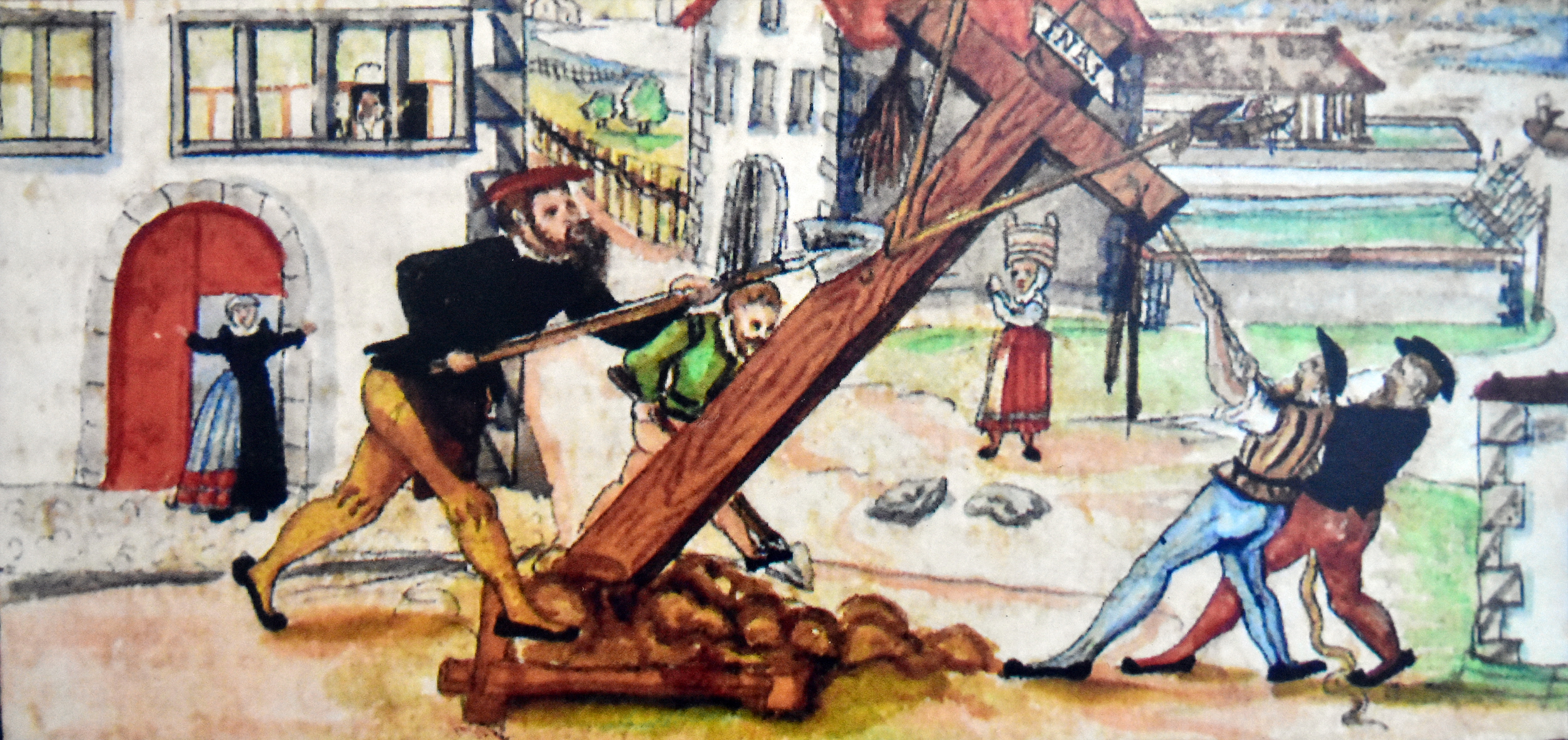
Stadelhofen, Bullinger chronicle of 1605

The Reformation in Zürich was promoted initially by Huldrych Zwingli, who gained the support of the magistrates of the city of Zürich and the princess abbess Katharina von Zimmern of the Fraumünster Abbey, and the population of the city of Zürich and agriculture-oriented population of the present Canton of Zürich in the early 1520s. It led to significant changes in civil life and state matters in Zürich and spread to several other cantons of the Old Swiss Confederacy, and thus initiated the Reformation in Switzerland.

== Prologue ==
At the time of the reformation, the city of Zürich was mainly dominated by the ancient families of Zürich and the guild representatives in the Kleiner Rat and Grosser Rat. The Kleiner Rat was equivalent to the executive branch of government. After about the 1490s, the Grosser Rat was mainly an equivalent of present-day committees to assist. Those dominating Zürich supported, in the late European Middle Ages, the then popular mendicant orders by attributing them free plots in the suburbs. The mendicant orders were asked to support the construction of the city wall in return. The city's fortification's construction began in the late 11th or 12th century and further on. Fraumünster Abbey was established in 873 AD, and its abbesses were imperial representans, i.e. de facto the mistresses of the city republic of Zürich to 1524 AD.

Memorial measurements in Zürich usually had to be held until the 14th century at Grossmünster, because thus the most income was achieved. Until the Reformation in Switzerland, all income obtained with the funerals had also to be delivered to the main parish church. Within the city, the mendicant orders, namely Predigerkloster and Augustinerkloster in the 15th-century have been reduced to the function of area pastors, thus the orders supported regime of the Guilds of Zürich.

The priories at Grossmünster and St. Peter were responsible for all religion related questions and decisions. The Oetenbach nunnery (1321 AD) became influential, as the convent of the Fraumünster had been for centuries. Nuns from both women's monasteries came from noble families. As a result, they owned the most financial resources and estates in the so-called Zürichgau. These estates were leased to the rural population who had to bring their products to feed Zürich. Furthermore, the water mills and the coinage right were held by the Fraumünster Abbey. Some local power was also held by the merchants, who had primarily secured the long distance trade outside the Old Swiss Confederacy. Later, the Guilds held power through the institution of the Grosser Rat, and the guilds' 12 deans in the Kleiner Rat, in the 14th and 15th century.

== Huldrych Zwingli ==
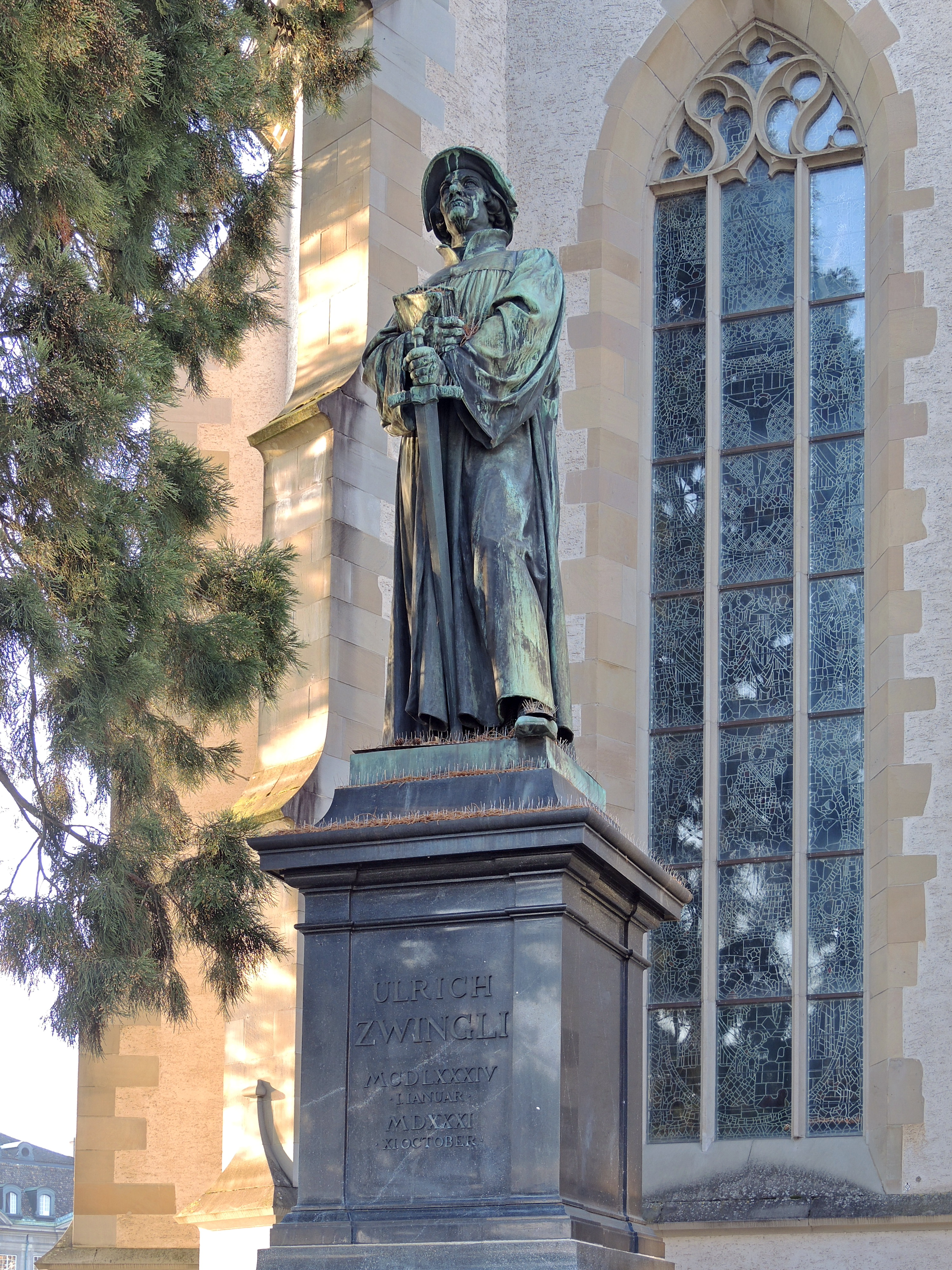
Zwingli memorial at Wasserkirche, Limmatquai in Zürich

Zwingli was born during a time of emerging Swiss patriotism and increasing criticism of the Swiss mercenary system, he attended the University of Vienna and the University of Basel, a Renaissance humanism. He continued his studies while he served as a pastor in Glarus and later in Einsiedeln, where he was influenced by the writings of Erasmus. In 1518, Zwingli became the pastor of the Grossmünster church where he began to preach ideas on reforming the Catholic Church. Oswald Myconius, a close friend of Zwingli, was teaching Latin at the Fraumünster cathedral school to the women. In January 1519 Ulrich Zwingli began at the Grossmünster church to put the Gospel into the center of the mass and to translate the Bible into the German language. Zwingli wrote about Katharina von Zimmern: "She belongs to the party of Christ and does not refuse any Support to me."

In his first public controversy in 1522, he attacked the custom of fasting during Lent. In his publications, he noted corruption in the ecclesiastical hierarchy, promoted clerical marriage, and attacked the use of images in places of worship. In 1523 the Reformation events themselves headlong into the city of Zürich. After disputations in the town hall, the churches were cleared and most of the sculptures of saints were stored in the Wasserkirche. In the adjacent Dominican convent, the city council gave permission to repeal the monasteries. In 1525, Zwingli introduced a new communion liturgy to replace the Mass. Zwingli also clashed with the Anabaptists, which resulted in their persecution. The Reformation spread to other parts of the Swiss Confederation, but several cantons resisted, preferring to remain Catholic. Zwingli formed an alliance of Reformed cantons which divided the Confederation along religious lines. In 1529, a war between the two sides was averted at the last moment. Meanwhile, Zwingli's ideas came to the attention of Martin Luther and other reformers. They met at the Marburg Colloquy and although they agreed on many points of doctrine, they could not reach an accord on the doctrine of the Real Presence of Christ in the Eucharist. In 1531 Zwingli's alliance applied an unsuccessful food blockade on the Catholic cantons. The cantons responded with an attack at a moment when Zürich was ill-prepared. Zwingli was killed in battle at the age of 47. His legacy lives on in the confessions, liturgy, and church orders of the Reformed churches of today.

== Anabaptists ==
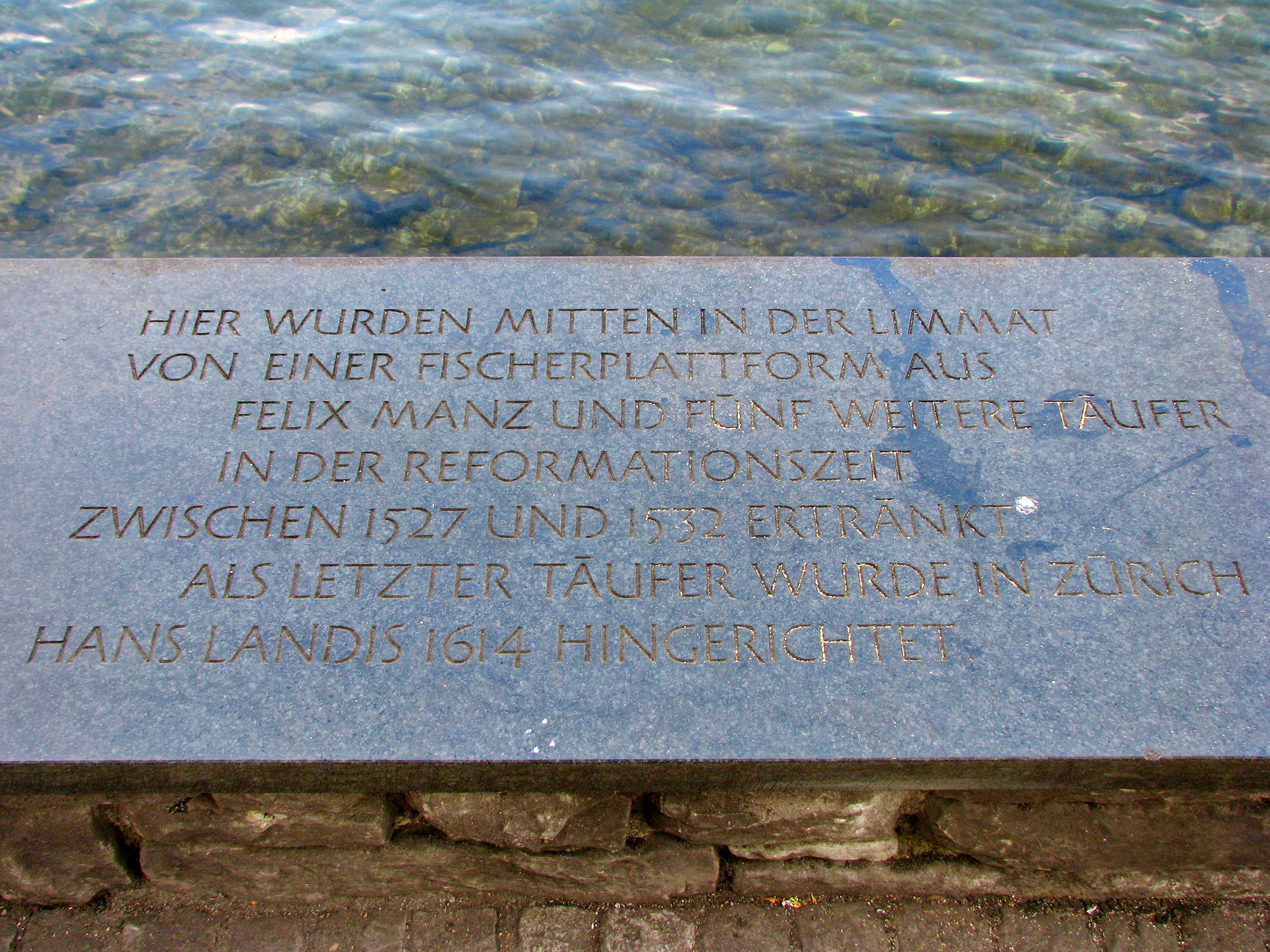
Memorial plate at Schipfe for Felix Manz and other anabaptists murdered by the Zürich city government

As early as 1522 anabaptism became evident when Zwingli started to reform preaching. However, some of his followers began to feel that Zwingli was not moving fast enough in his reform. The division between Zwingli and his more radical disciples became apparent in October 1523 on occasion of a disputation when the mass in fact was not changed in practice. Feeling frustrated, some of the more progressive reformers began to meet on their own for Bible study, and around 1523, William Reublin began to preach against infant baptism in the villages of the city republic of Zürich, encouraging parents to not baptize their children. Felix Manz began to publish some of Andreas Karlstadt's writings, but the council had instructed Zwingli to reject infant baptism "until the matter could be resolved." Felix Manz petitioned the city's council to find a solution, that was in fact never found: "Here in the middle of the River Limmat from a fishing platform were drowned Felix Manz and five other Anabaptists during the Reformation of 1527 to 1532. Hans Landis, the last Anabaptist, was executed in Zurich during 1614."

== Consolidation ==
The forces of Zürich are defeated in the battle of Kappel (1548 etching).

Zwingli started the Reformation at the time when he was the preacher at Zürich's Grossmünster, the main Roman Catholic church of the canton of Zürich. Katharina von Zimmern (1478-1547), the last abbess of the Fraumünster Abbey and the formal mistress of the city republic of Zürich, supported the peaceful introduction of the reformation. At the defeat of Zürich during the Second War of Kappel, Zwingli and many of its supporters were killed in 1531, among them former monks of the monasteries Kappel, Rheinau and Rüti, then the first Reformed parish priests in the Reformed parishes that spread in the present canton of Zürich, among others in the Rüti Church. Following the Reformation, the abbeys were converted to public schools to educate well-taught Protestants, and so the Reformation survived. Maybe more importantly, the abolishment of the monasteries and their enormous property, buildings and estates, and primarily the income taxes by the cantonal farmers, were assigned to an according Amt, a bailiwick of the according administratively functions on behalf of the city's government (Rat), thus also the financial base was established to prosper and to survive the loss of the first generation reformers. People of influence still supported the Reformation, the city's council, the former Roman Catholic clergy, and people mean and respected by the population, among them the publisher Christoph Froschauer and close friend of Zwingli, but also the second generation reformers as Heinrich Bullinger and Leo Jud.

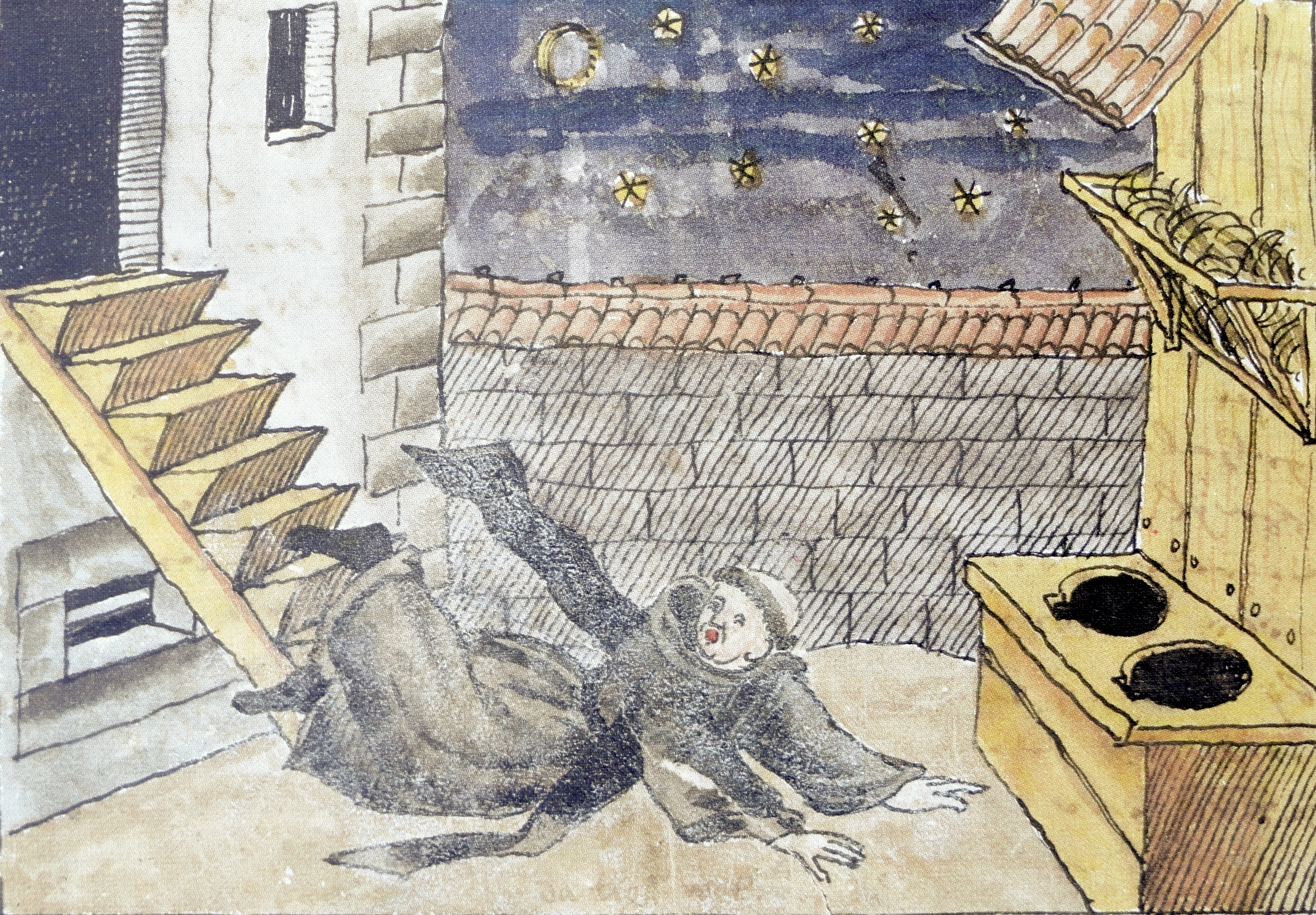
Sebastian Hegner, the last surviving member of the convent of the Rüti Abbey, dies in Rapperswil on 10 November 1561.

The Reformed forces also initiated the former Latin school Prophezey or Prophezei (so called because Zwingli called Bible interpretation "prophesying") into a training center for reformed theologians, by a Zürich city's council mandate on 29 September 1523; lesson started on 19 Juni 1525. The weekday lectures (Lezgen or Lectiones, literally: lessons) were free of charge for the interested people in the urban and rural areas of the city republic Zürich, by well-learned men. Heinrich Bullinger's Schola Tigurina may have influenced the education in many other institutions beginning in 1559. Bullinger's Schola Tigurina, the present day Carolinum, merged in the 18th century to the theological faculty and the upper secondary school in the then Carolinum been. The financing of the chairs respectively professorships was depending on the benefices of the secularized canons of the former Grossmünster priory. In addition to theological subjects and Classical languages, in 1541 the natural history department (Conrad Gessner) and in 1731 a political science chair (Johann Jakob Bodmer) were founded, and in 1782 the surgical institute to train medical doctors. Zwingli's German-language Zürich Bible or commonly Froschauer Bible, named after Christoph Froschauer's publishing house, first appeared in 1531, and is continued to be revised until the present day.

== See also ==
- Affair of the Sausages
- History of Zürich
- Reformation in Switzerland
- Reformierte Kirche des Kantons Zürich
- Zürich Bible

== Literature ==
- Gordon, Bruce. The Swiss Reformation. University of Manchester Press, 2002. ISBN 978-0-7190-5118-0.
- Staatsarchiv des Kantons Zürich: Kleine Zürcher Verfassungsgeschichte 1218–2000. Published by Direktion der Justiz und des Innern des Kantons Zürich, Chronos, Zürich 2000, ISBN 3-9053-1403-7.
- Luck, James M.: A History of Switzerland / The First 100,000 Years: Before the Beginnings to the Days of the Present, Society for the Promotion of Science & Scholarship, Palo Alto 1986. ISBN 0-930664-06-X.
