= Thomas Wyttenbach =

Swiss Reformer during the Protestant Reformation

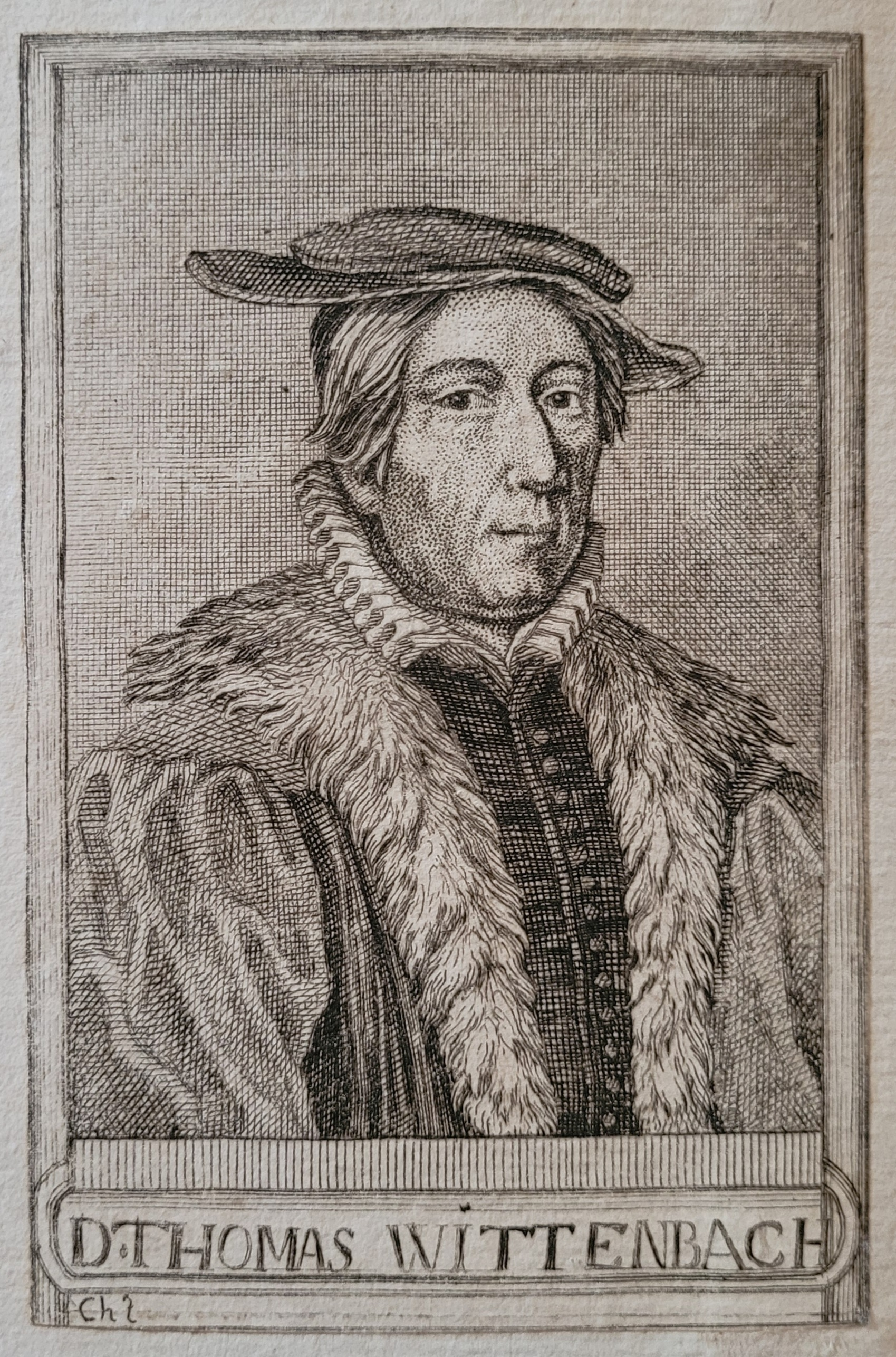
Thomas Wyttenbach

Thomas Wyttenbach (c.1472; after 21 September 1526) was one of the reformers of the city of Biel, Switzerland, during the Protestant Reformation.

== Biography ==
Wyttenbach was born in Biel. He studied liberal arts and theology at the University of Tübingen from 1496 to 1504. He was awarded a Baccalaureus (Bachelor's) degree in 1498, a Magister artium (Master of Arts) in 1500, and an apprentice professor (Baccalaureus biblicus; Bachelor of Theology in Biblical Studies) in 1504. In 1505, he moved to the University of Basel, where he worked as Sententiarius. Among his students were Ulrich Zwingli and Leo Jud. In 1507, he became a priest at St Benedict's City Church in Biel. In parallel, Wyttenbach continued his studies and received a Doctor in Theology in 1515.

In the years 1515 to 1520, in addition to his position in Biel, Wyttenbach served as canon (custodian) at the Collegiate Church St. Vincent (Bern Minster) in Bern. From 1520, he worked in Biel until his death.

In the early summer of 1523, Wyttenbach rejected the doctrine of transubstantiation in an exchange of letters with Ulrich Zwingli. Zwingli's reply to Wyttenbach was sent on June 15, 1523.

Wyttenbach married in the summer of 1524 (name of wife unknown), which is why he was dismissed from his sinecure at the City Church. He continued to preach at the commandery of the Order of Saint John in Biel.

== Honours ==
In Biel, a street (Thomas-Wyttenbach-Strasse) and a building of the protestant parish is named after him.

== Bibliography ==
- Blösch (1898). "Wyttenbach, Thomas". Allgemeine Deutsche Biographie (in German). Vol. 44. Leipzig: Duncker & Humblot. pp. 434–436.
- Erich Wenneker (1998). "WYTTENBACH, Thomas". In Bautz, Traugott (ed.). Biographisch-Bibliographisches Kirchenlexikon (BBKL) (in German). Vol. 14. Herzberg: Bautz. cols. 264–266. ISBN 3-88309-073-5.
