= Christoph Froschauer =

Swiss printer (1490–1564)

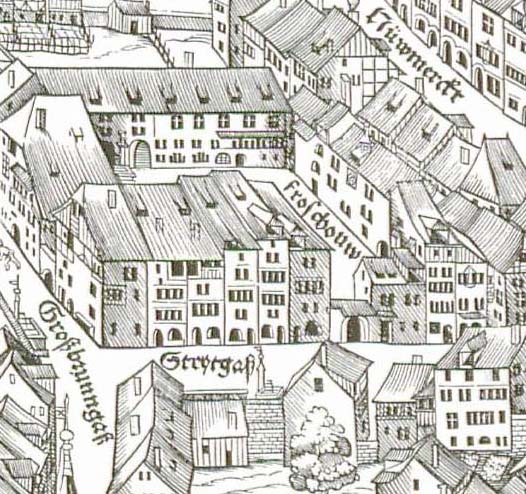
The Froschau quarter in Zürich, as shown on the 1576 Murerplan, printed by Christoph Froschauer the Younger

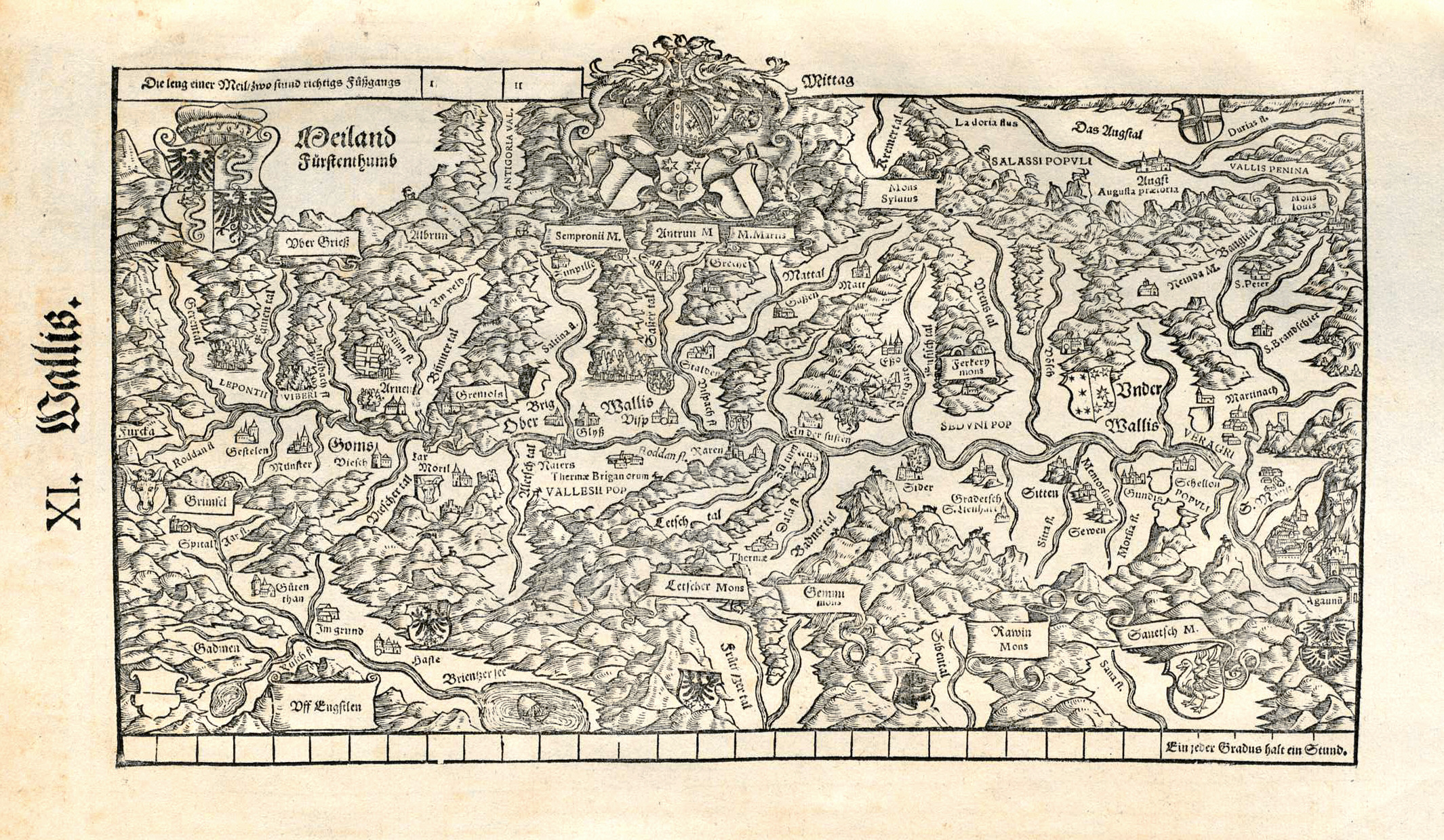
Map of the Valais, in the Landtaflen by Johannes Stumpf and Christoph Froschauer, Zürich 1556

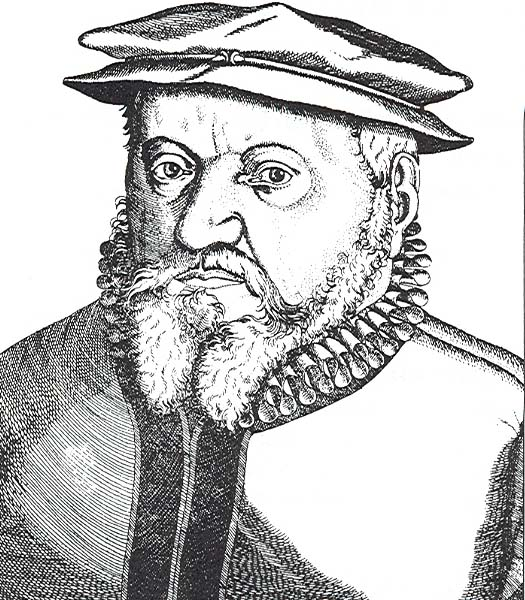
Christoph Froschauer the Younger

Christoph Froschauer (ca. 1490 – 1 April 1564) was the first printer in Zurich, notable for printing the Froschauer Bible, the Zwinglian Bible translation in 1524. His workshop is the nucleus of the Orell Füssli publishing house.

Froschauer was born in Neuburg near Oettingen (Bavaria). He learned the printer's trade with his uncle, Hans Froschauer, in Augsburg and came to Zurich in 1515. He gained citizenship to Zurich in 1519. Working for one Hans Rüegger, he built a printing press. At Rüegger's death in 1517, Froschauer married his widow and took over the press.

A dispute over fasting regulations during Lent led to Froschauer being arrested in 1522. This brought about open conflict between Zwingli and the clerical establishment, thus setting off the Reformation in Zürich.

At his wife's death in 1550, he married Dorothea Locher.

The Froschau quarter of Zürich, just off the current Froschaugasse (47°22′24″N 8°32′43″E), is named for Froschauer. The historical workshop was at the northern boundary of the Froschau, at Brunngass 18, facing the Zähringerplatz.

He printed the works of Erasmus von Rotterdam, Luther and notably of Zwingli. He also published religious works by Leo Jud, Heinrich Bullinger and Rudolf Gwalther, as well as scientific works, including Joachim Vadian's 1534 atlas, the 1547/48 chronicle of Johannes Stumpf and Conrad Gessner's 1551–1558 Historia animalium. Between 1520 and 1564, about 700 titles in close to a million copies left Froschauer's four presses. The paper used was produced in the city's paper mill at the Limmat, also operated by Froschauer.

Froschauer died of plague in 1564 in Zurich. His nephew Christoph Froschauer the Younger (1532–1585) took over the shop.

== Froschauer Bible ==
The Froschauer Bible was a complete German Bible translated from the original Hebrew and Greek texts; it was published in five volumes between 1524 and 1529.

This Bible was translated by Luther, Zwingli and Jud; the final volume (which included the Apocrypha) was published five years before Luther’s own translation of the full Bible in 1534.

== Legacy ==
The name ‘Froschauer’ means “man from the frog meadow”, and the Froschauers used a drawing of a frog as their printing mark.

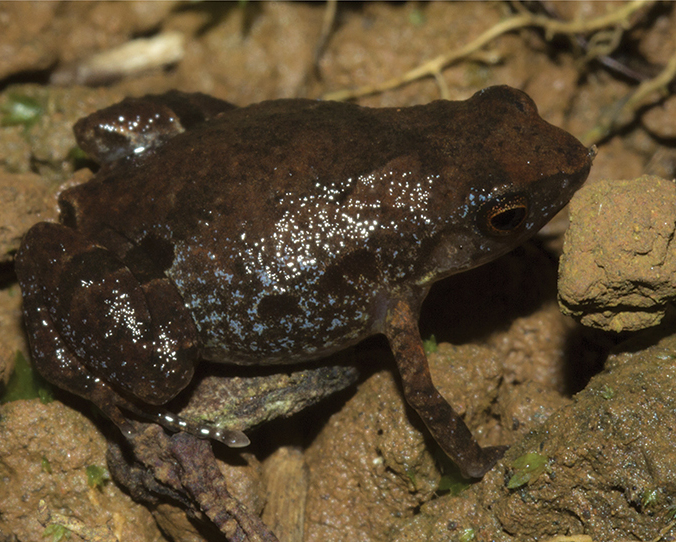
Holotype of Stumpffia froschaueri, a frog named after Froschauer

Stumpffia froschaueri, a frog in the genus Stumpffia, was named after him in 2020.

== See also ==
- History of Zürich
