= Leo Jud =

Swiss reformer (1482–1542)

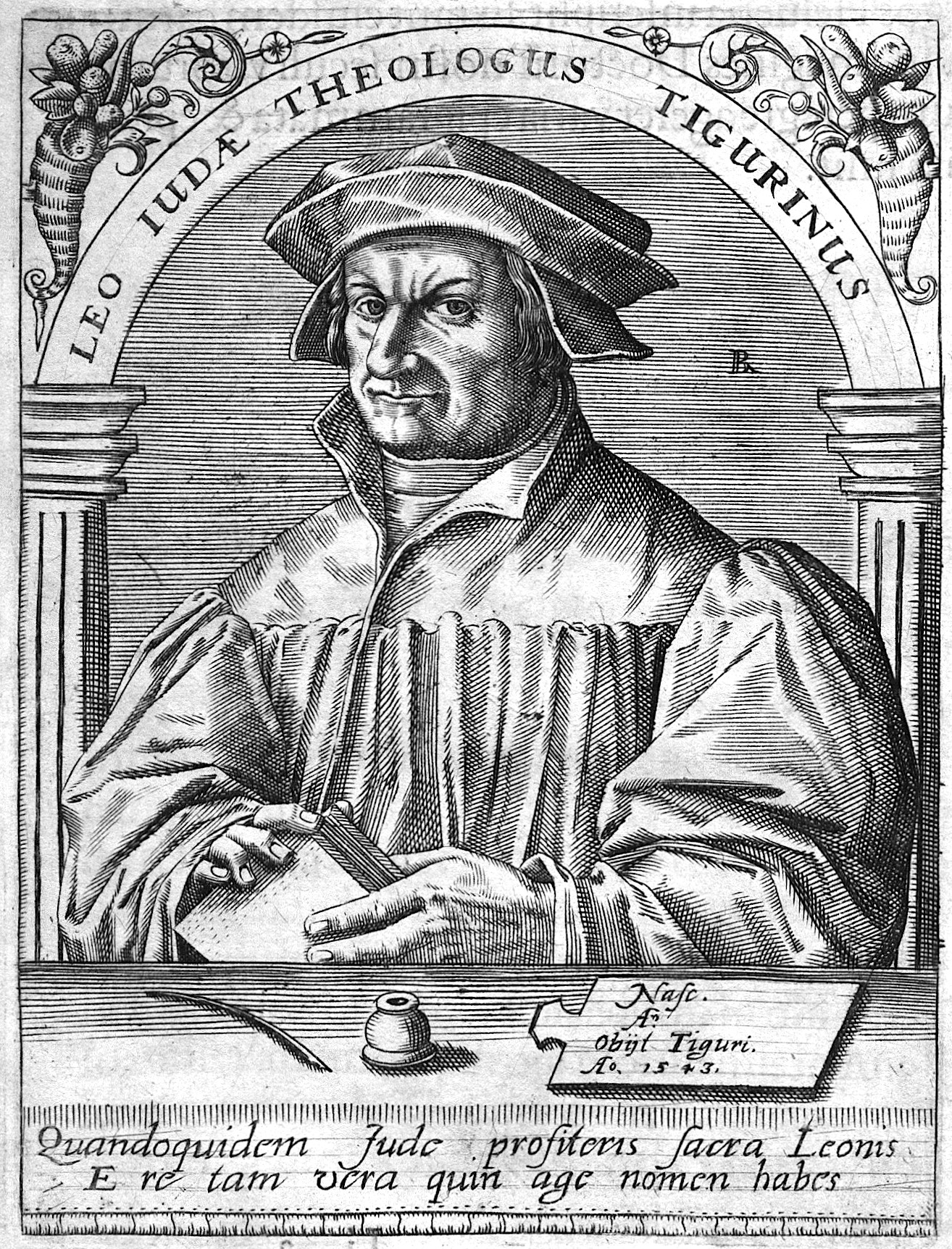
Leo Judon on an engraving

Leo Jud (/dʒʌd/; also Leo Juda, Leo Judä, Leo Judas, Leonis Judae, Ionnes Iuda, Leo Keller; 1482 – 19 June 1542), known to his contemporaries as Meister Leu, was a Swiss reformer who worked with Huldrych Zwingli in Zürich.

== Biography ==
Jud was born in 1482 in Guémar, Alsace, southwest of Strasbourg. Like his later colleague Heinrich Bullinger, Jud was the son of a priest. His father, Johannes Jud, was from Guémar and his mother, Elsa Hochsang, was from Solothurn.

He studied at the Latin school in Sélestat with Martin Bucer and in 1499 he matriculated at the University of Basel, where he met Huldrych Zwingli. The two of them struck up a life-long friendship. He began his studies in medicine but switched to theology under the influence of Thomas Wyttenbach. Leo Jud is one of the lesser-known leaders of the Swiss Reformed Church, but his influence was extensive.

Jud was ordained by the Church at Rome in 1507, and from 1507 to 1512 he was a deacon at Saint Theodore in Basel, then, from 1512 to 1518, he served as the preacher at Saint Hippolyte in Alsace. In 1519, he became Zwingli's associate at Einsiedeln (in Schwyz), where his reform-minded tendencies showed through clearly.

The 1520s were a time of great productivity for Jud. On 9 March 1522, he participated in the Affair of the Sausages during Lent, a protest against the established food mandates of the church. That summer he translated Zwingli's petition to the bishop of Constance (Konstanz) for the legitimization of clerical marriage from Latin into German.

In June 1522, Jud was selected to be pastor at Saint Peter's in Zürich (on Zwingli's recommendation), although he did not take up his post until 2 February 1523. Jud assumed his preaching duties only four days after the First Zürich Disputation.

During 1523, Jud became increasingly involved in Reformation efforts. On 7 March 1523, he was appointed the pastor of the Oetenbach nunnery in Zürich, which housed Dominican nuns. That summer he began preaching against clerical marriage prohibitions, which resulted in a group of the nuns at petitioning to be released from their vows. The same year, he drew up the baptismal rite for the Swiss Reformed Church in German, which still retained some Catholic elements to it. In September of that year, Jud preached a sermon in Saint Peter's against religious images, and the result was several acts of iconoclasm in Zürich. Jud (along with Zwingli) called for the complete removal of images, desiring the restoral of the apostolic church.

This call for iconoclasm was something characteristic of some French-speaking Swiss reformers as well, such as Pierre Viret and Guillaume Farel. Images in the church remained a point of contention between the Swiss Reformers and magistrates for another several years.

The appearance of Anabaptism in January 1525 forced the Swiss Reformers to divert their attention to this new movement. On 17 January 1525, Jud participated in a dispute alongside Zwingli and other reformers against the Anabaptists. The advent of Anabaptism required a more detailed statement from the Swiss church than the original 1523 statement on baptism, and Zwingli put forth a new baptismal order in 1525. The new order mandated that the ceremony be held in a parish church, the godparents were no longer asked questions about their faith, and baptismal theology was more explicitly in line with covenant theology and not the removal of original sin as taught by the Catholic church.

In addition to redefining baptism, a new statement appeared in 1525 on the Lord's Supper, which Jud was largely responsible for.

== Reformation ==
As the Reformation began to spread and gain ground, new actions were being taken to purge Catholic influence. On 11 April 1525, Jud appeared before the Zürich magistrates with Zwingli, Kaspar Megander, Oswald Myconius and others, petitioning for abolition of the mass. Jud also contributed to establishing the Ehegericht, or marriage court, in Zürich, which opened roughly one month later, on 10 May 1525, for which Jud served as a judge.

On 19 June 1525, the Carolinum Reformed institution of theological training, also known as the Prophezei, opened in the Grossmünster in Zürich, where Jud was a prominent figure. After the morning Bible lectures from Konrad Pellikan and Huldrych Zwingli, Jud would preach a sermon in German which represented a synthesizing of the morning lectures. In this way, Jud was the "public face" of the Prophezei. In 1531, Jud helped Zwingli produce the first Zürich Bible, which represented the efforts of the Prophezei.

The late 1520s was a flurry of activity for Jud and the Swiss Reformers as they were dealing with Anabaptism, the resurgence of Catholicism in other territories, and the Eucharistic controversies with the Lutherans. Martin Luther published his sermon against the Sacramentarians Eucharistic theology in 1526 with his book The Sacrament of the Body and Blood of Christ—Against the Fanatics.

== After the Second War of Kappel ==
After the disaster of the Second War of Kappel in October 1531, which resulted in Zwingli's death at the hands of the Catholic forces, the backlash against Zwingli's followers was enormous. Gangs rampaged through Zürich, looking to lynch those associated with Zwingli, who was generally held responsible for the debacle at Kappel.

Jud's friends begged him to dress in women's clothing and hide, but instead he continued to boldly preach in Zürich, referring to Kappel as God's judgment, not for abandoning the Catholic faith, but for not carrying reform far enough.

Hans Escher, who had led the evangelical forces but loathed Zwingli, swore that he would kill Jud upon his return. A negotiation team was sent to meet the returning army and was able to procure a promise of peace before the army entered the city. Not long after though, forces from Schwyz set up outside Zürich, leading men such as Jud and Oswald Myconius to prepare for the worst. However, the army moved on, deciding not to attack Zürich.

Following Zwingli's death, Jud went into a depression that prevented him from taking any leadership positions in the church. In addition, as a foreigner he was viewed with high suspicion at that time, following what the "foreigner" Zwingli had led Zürich into at Kappel. Instead of Jud, Bullinger was elected to replace Zwingli on 9 December, and he took up his post the following month.

In addition to this period of depression, some of Jud's theological and ecclesiastical views changed drastically, albeit temporarily, after falling under the influence of Caspar Schwenckfeld, a German spiritualist, and to a lesser extent Johannes Oecolampadius. He abandoned Zwinglian thought regarding the magistrates and began to see all magistrates as opposed to the church; he also rejected infant baptism and a corporate emphasis on the church. In 1532, Jud was involved in preparation of Justification by Faith of Michael Weiß, a preacher of the Bohemian Brethren. Bullinger was alarmed by Jud's association with the Brethren and tried to persuade him to avoid them.

Between 1533 and 1534, correspondence between Jud and Schwenckfeld was high. However, in December 1534 Jud made his way back to the Reformed camp and reconciled with Bullinger.

== The Zürich Council ==
On 22 October 1532, Jud and Bullinger issued a document outlining the Reformed faith to the Zürich Council. The document was the formative piece of the Swiss Reformation and it outlined three topics: the election of ministers, the life and learning of ministers, and the constitution of the synod. The Synod worked in tandem with the Ehegericht as the governing bodies of Zürich.

In 1534, revision of the Zürich Bible began, which was overseen by Jud. Errors in the 1531 edition were corrected in addition to adding more chapter summaries and parallel passages. Jud worked with Theodore Bibliander to translate the Zürich Latin version from the Hebrew. It was during the 1530s, following the death of Zwingli, that Jud began to gain an international reputation as Reformer and Biblical scholar.

In December 1535, Jud met with Konrad Pellikan, Theodor Bibliander (from Zürich) and Oswald Myconius and Simon Grynaeus (from Basle) to try and harmonize their theology. Zwinglian and Lutheran rifts were plaguing the Swiss Reformation and straining the relationships between centers of reform throughout the Swiss Confederation. The result was five articles on the Lord's Supper, which seemed to indicate positive movement towards reconciliation, even from Luther.

Months later, beginning in January 1536, the Basle magistrates summoned the first council of the Reformed church. Theologians and magistrates from all over the Swiss Confederation attended, among whom Jud was a leading figure. Other figures included Martin Bucer, Wolfgang Capito, Heinrich Bullinger, Simon Grynaeus, and Oswald Myconius. The result was The First Helvetic Confession, and Jud was asked to translate it into German. Jud took up the task but also used the opportunity to add some Zwinglian tones to the document. Jud's German translation was the generally accepted throughout the Confederation over the Latin version.

In the late 1530s and early 1540s, efforts intensified to produce a new edition of the Latin Vulgate. Even though a new Vulgate was printed in 1539, Jud was responsible for producing the first truly "Reformed" Latin Bible. He worked on it throughout the 1530s until his illness halted his efforts. After his death in 1542 in Zürich, other Swiss theologians and scholars, such as Theodor Bibliander, Rudolf Gwalther, and Konrad Pellikan, picked up where Jud left off, and the Biblia Sacrosancta was published in 1543, one year after Jud's death.

== Publications ==
Jud is responsible for several other influential publications, including large and small catechisms in 1534, which were published in German, followed by a Latin edition in 1538, and another catechism in 1541. He also published Zwingli's New Testament exegeses lectures in 1539, Proverba Solomonis (The Proverbs of Solomon), and the Biblia Sacrosancta, published posthumously in 1543. Jud's work was influential all over Europe, being disseminated as far as Hungary. It is also assumed that Jud played a role in converting the printer Christoph Froschauer, who was critical in distributing Zwingli's works in Germany. Jud exemplified the heavy interiority of spiritualism that was so present in Zwingli's theology, which was a hallmark of the majority of the Swiss movements.

Leo Jud died from illness in 1542.
