= Kaspar Megander =

Swiss reformer

Kaspar Megander (German: Großmann; 1495 – 18 August 1545) was a Swiss reformer in Zürich and Bern who supported Huldrych Zwingli and was influential in the early years of the Swiss Reformation.

== Life ==
Megander was born in Zürich, Switzerland in 1484, and studied in Basel from 1515 to 1518, before moving back to Zürich to take up a hospital chaplaincy. He supported Zwingli in his reforms of marriage in the priesthood, marrying his housekeeper in 1524. He was also collaborated with Zwingli in the creation of the Prophezey and the Zürich Bible. In 1528, he was one of the representatives of Zürich at the Bern Disputation, where he gave the sermon "On Steadfastness" at the end of the disputation. The sermon was well received, and he was called to Bern from Zürich as a preacher and professor for 10 years. He was very influential in Bern in setting up theological instruction for the laity, and was often a representative of Bern to different councils and disputations.

Megander's zeal, however, led to difficulties. Megander's loyalty to Zwingli led to a heavy stance against Lutheran theology, and under his influence Bern never theologically reconciled with Strasbourg and Martin Bucer. His stance against the Bernese city officials in the aftermath of the Kappel Wars let to his deposition until Wolfgang Capito interceded for him and helped restore his position in the 1532 Bern synod. During the interim, he was one of the people named to replace Zwingli after his death in Zürich, but Heinrich Bullinger took the position instead. He participated in the drafting of the First Helvetic Confession in Basel in 1536 with Strasbourg Lutheran representatives Bucer and Capito. However, he could not reconcile with Bucer and Capito in the Wittenberg Concord of 1536. Also in this year, he was very influential in the Lausanne Disputation and the reformation in Vaud. In his own 1536 catechism, he officially endorsed Zwingli's doctrine of the sacraments wholesale, and preached against the Lutheran doctrine of the sacraments. This eventually led to opposition from Bucer's party, especially coming to head in a synod in Bern in 1537. Later that same year, Bucer modified Megander's catechism without his approval, and Megander left Bern and returned to Zürich. At Zürich, Megander was an ardent supporter and guardian of Zwingli's heritage until his death in 1545.

In addition to writing commentaries on Galatians, Ephesians, and the Pastoral Epistles, he also was an editor of Zwingli's works.
