= Zurich Bible =

Swiss German Bible translation based on Huldrych Zwingli's work

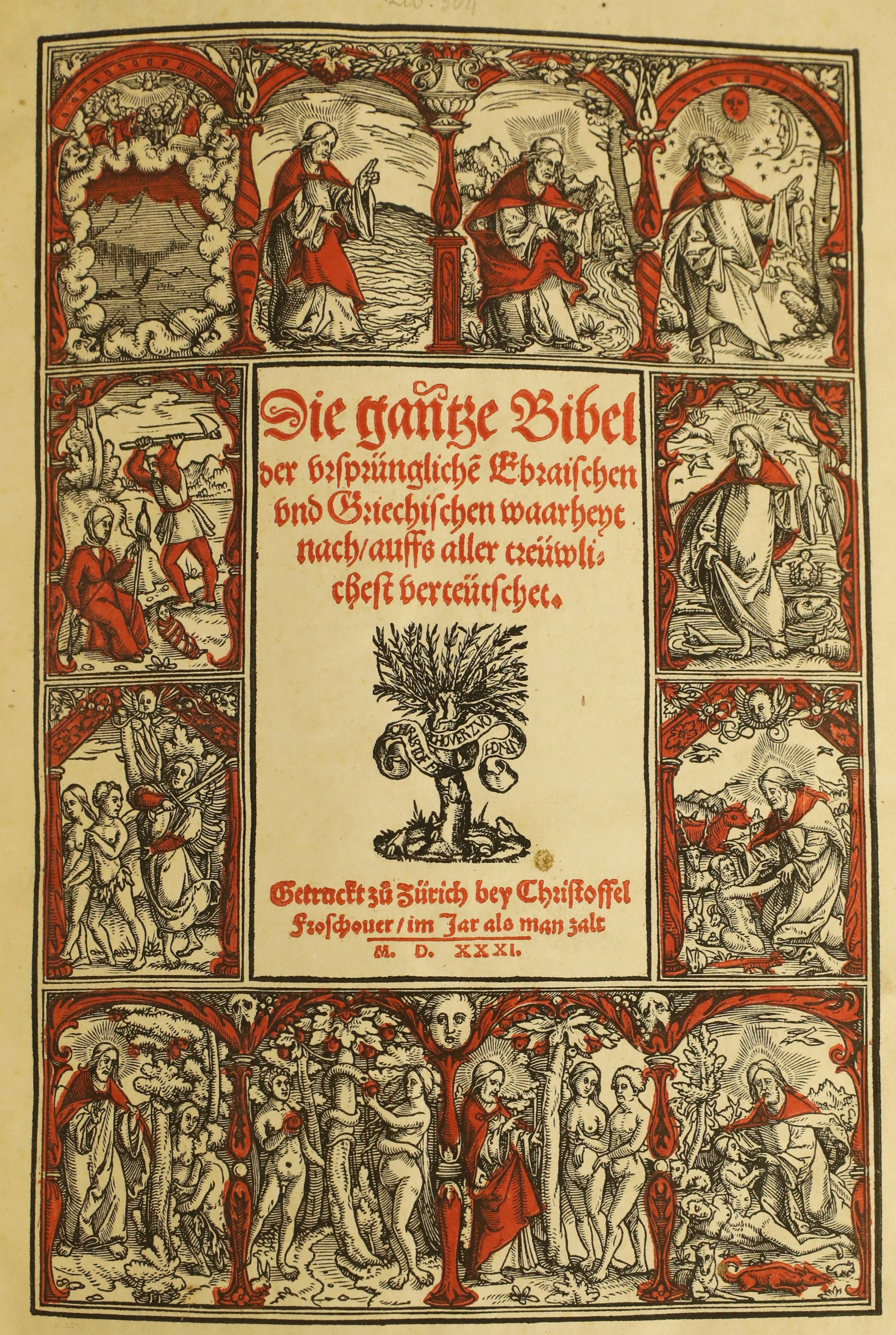
Title page of Zürch bible, 1531. Printed by Froschauer, this was for quite a while the most significant edition of the Zürich bible, from a textual and design perspective.

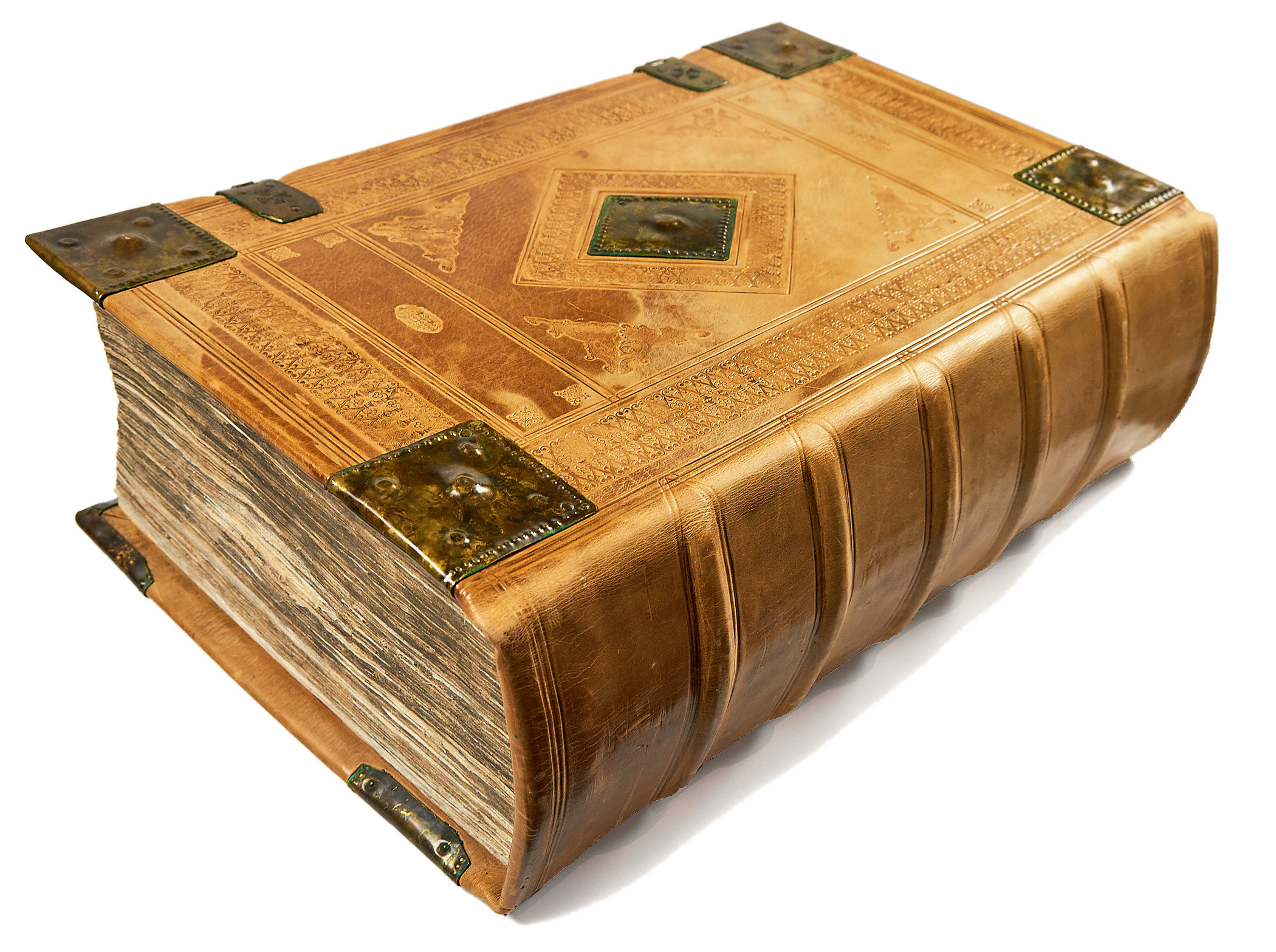
Froschauer bible, 1580

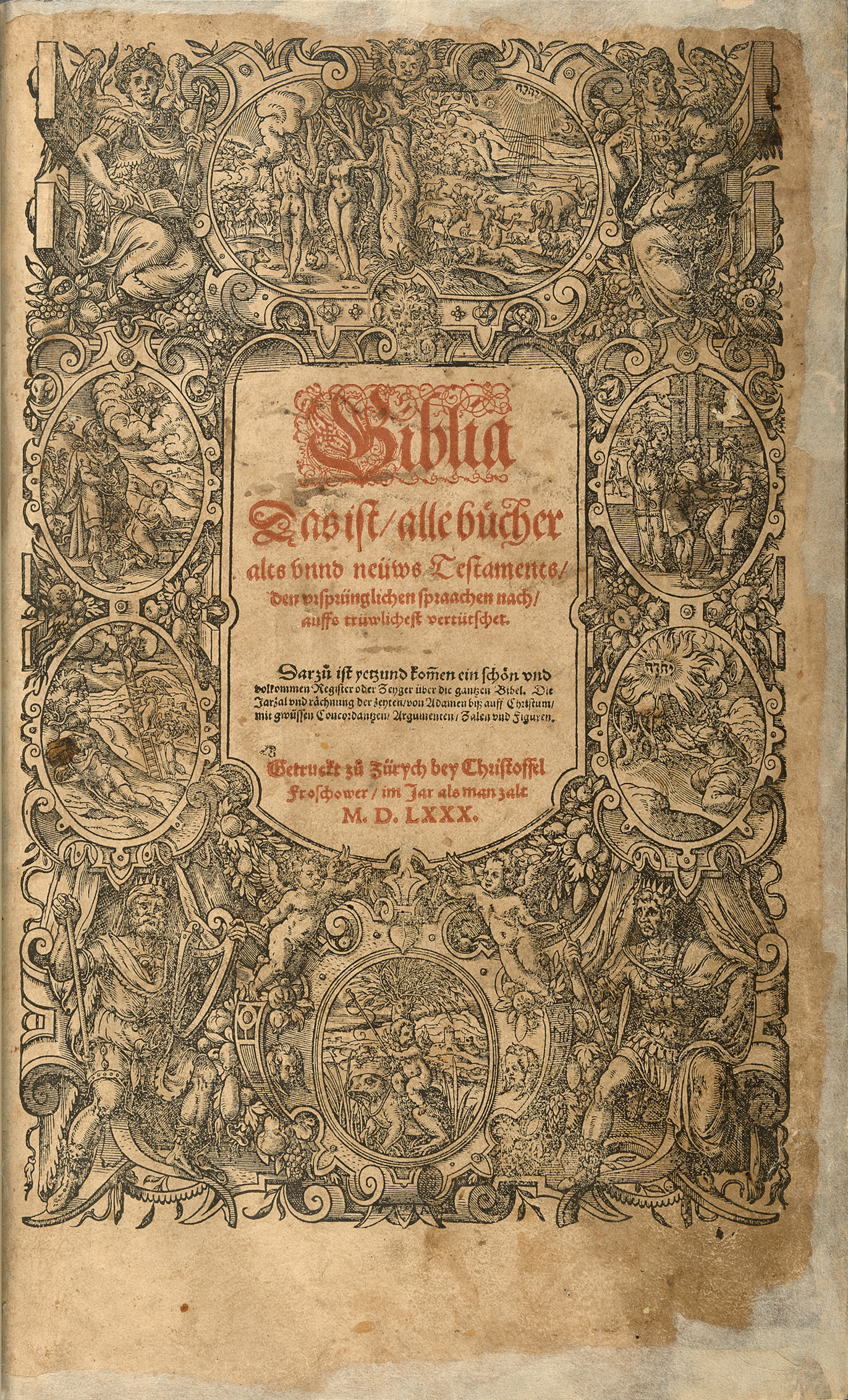
title page Froschauer-Bibel from 1580

The Zurich Bible (Zürcher Bibel, also Zwinglibibel) is a Swiss German Bible translation historically based on the rescensions of Huldrych Zwingli. Recent editions have a stated aim of maximal philological exactitude.

It is thought to be the first Bible to contain a map.

== Froschau Bible ==
Zwingli's translation grew out of the Prophezey, an exegetical workshop that took place every weekday. All of the clergy of Zürich participated, working at a Swiss German rendition of Bible texts to benefit the congregations.

The translation of Martin Luther was used as far as it was completed. The books of the prophets were derived from the 1527 translation of the Anabaptists Ludwig Haetzer and Hans Denck. These helped Zwingli to complete the entire translation four years before Luther. The rest of the Old Testament translation is mainly due to Zwingli and his friend Leo Jud, pastor of St. Peter parish.

At the printing shop of Christoph Froschauer, the New Testament appeared in print from 1525 to 1529, and later, parts of the Old Testament. A complete translation in a single volume was first printed in 1530, with an introduction by Zwingli and summaries of each chapter. This Froschauer Bible, containing more than 200 illustrations, was a masterpiece of printing at the time.

The translation of the Old Testament was revised in 1540, that of the New Testament in 1574, and verse numbering was introduced in 1589.

In 1975, Amos Hoover of Denver, Pennsylvania, reprinted the 1536 edition, and the 1531 edition appeared under the imprint of the Theologischer Verlag Zürich in 1983.

== Revisions ==
Up to 1665, the language of the translation was based on the written variant of High Alemannic (Swiss German) used for official documents. In 1665, this was abandoned for the emerging Standard German of the chancery of the prince-electorate Saxony-Wittenberg.

Fraumünster pastor Johann Caspar Ulrich (1705–1768) in the 1755/1756 revision added commentaries, interpretations and concordances. From this edition, the Bible became known as the Zwinglibibel. From 1817, the edition was in the hands of the Zürich Bible and Missionary Society (Zürcher Bibel- und Missionsgesellschaft). Another revision dates to 1868, reprinted in 1892.

== 1931 revision ==
In 1907, a commission was formed with the purpose of another revision, with the aim of considering as much as possible recent result of biblical scholarship. The revision was completed in 1931, constituting essentially a new translation.

== 2007 revision ==
In 1984, on the 500th anniversary of Zwingli's birth, another revision was initiated by the General Synod of the Protestant Reformed Church of the Canton Zürich. However, it soon was decided to undertake a new translation of the entire Bible. At a total cost of four million Swiss francs, the project was completed in early 2007, and the Bible was published in printed and electronic form in June 2007.

== See also ==
- Luther Bible
- German Bible translations
- Reformation in Zürich
- Zurich Bible of 1531

== Online versions ==
- 1531 version
- 1534 version
