= Peter Martyr Vermigli =

Italian Reformed theologian (1499 – 1562)

The Reverend Peter Martyr Vermigli
- Pietro Martire Vermigli
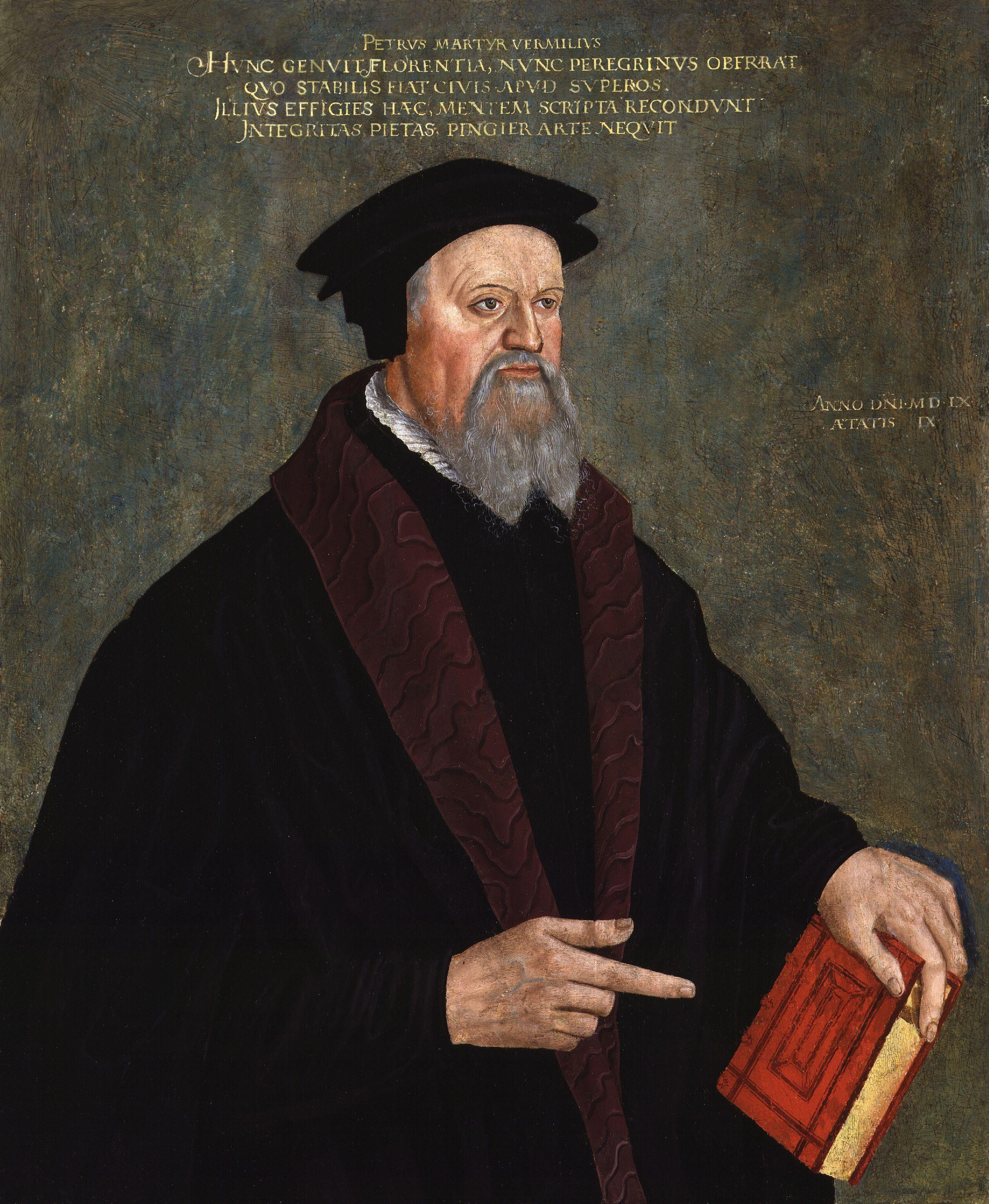
- Pietro Vermigli (1560) (Note: The attribution of this painting to Hans Asper was disputed by Roy Strong, but more recent scholarship affirms the attribution. The Latin poem at top, probably composed by Rudolph Gualther, translates: Florence brought him forth, Now he wanders as a foreigner and pilgrim That he might forever be a citizen among those above. This is his likeness; the writings conceal his mind; Integrity and piety cannot be represented by art.)
- Born: Piero Mariano Vermigli; 8 September 1499; Florence, Holy Roman Empire
- Died: 12 November 1562 (aged 63); Zürich, Swiss Confederacy
- Education: University of Padua
- Ordination: 1525
- Theological work
- Era: Reformation
- Tradition or movement: Reformed tradition
- Notable ideas: Defence of the Reformed doctrine of the Eucharist

Peter Martyr Vermigli (Note: His name in his native Italian is Pietro Martire Vermigli. He was born Piero Mariano Vermigli, but took the name Peter Martyr when he became a monk. In earlier literature, he was usually called Peter Martyr, but modern scholars usually use Vermigli to distinguish him from other Christian figures also called Peter Martyr.) (/vɜːrˈmɪɡli/; 8 September 1499 – 12 November 1562) was an Italian-born Reformed theologian. His early work as a reformer in Catholic Italy and his decision to flee for Protestant northern Europe influenced some other Italians to convert and flee as well. In England, he influenced the Edwardian Reformation, including the Eucharistic service of the 1552 Book of Common Prayer. He was considered an authority on the Eucharist among the Reformed churches and engaged in controversies on the subject by writing treatises. Vermigli's Loci Communes, a compilation of excerpts from his biblical commentaries, became a standard Reformed theological textbook.

Born in Florence, Vermigli entered a religious order and was appointed to influential posts as abbot and prior. He came in contact with leaders of the Italian spirituali reform movement, and read Protestant theologians such as Martin Bucer and Ulrich Zwingli. He came to accept Protestant beliefs about salvation and the Eucharist. To satisfy his conscience and avoid persecution by the Roman Inquisition, he fled Italy for Protestant northern Europe. He ultimately arrived in Strasbourg, where he taught on the Old Testament of the Bible under Bucer. English reformer Thomas Cranmer invited him to take an influential post at Oxford University where he continued to teach the Bible. He also defended his Eucharistic beliefs against Catholic proponents of transubstantiation in a public disputation. Vermigli was forced to leave England on the accession of the Catholic Queen Mary. As a Marian exile he returned to Strasbourg and his former teaching position. Vermigli's beliefs regarding the Eucharist and predestination clashed with those of leading Lutherans in Strasbourg, so he transferred to Reformed Zürich where he taught until his death in 1562.

Vermigli's best-known theological contribution was defending the Reformed doctrine of the Eucharist against Catholics and Lutherans. Contrary to the Catholic doctrine of transubstantiation, Vermigli did not believe that the bread and wine are changed into Christ's body and blood. He also disagreed with the Lutheran view that Christ's body is ubiquitous and so can be present in the Eucharist. Instead, Vermigli taught that Christ remains in Heaven even though he is offered to those who partake of the Eucharist and received by believers.

Vermigli developed a strong doctrine of predestination independently of John Calvin. His interpretation was that God's will determines election and the reprobation of the non-elect. Vermigli's belief is similar but not identical to Calvin's. Vermigli's political theology was important in the Elizabethan settlement; he provided theological justification for royal supremacy, the doctrine that the king of a territory, rather than any ecclesiastical authority, rules the church.

== Life ==
=== Early life (1499–1525) ===
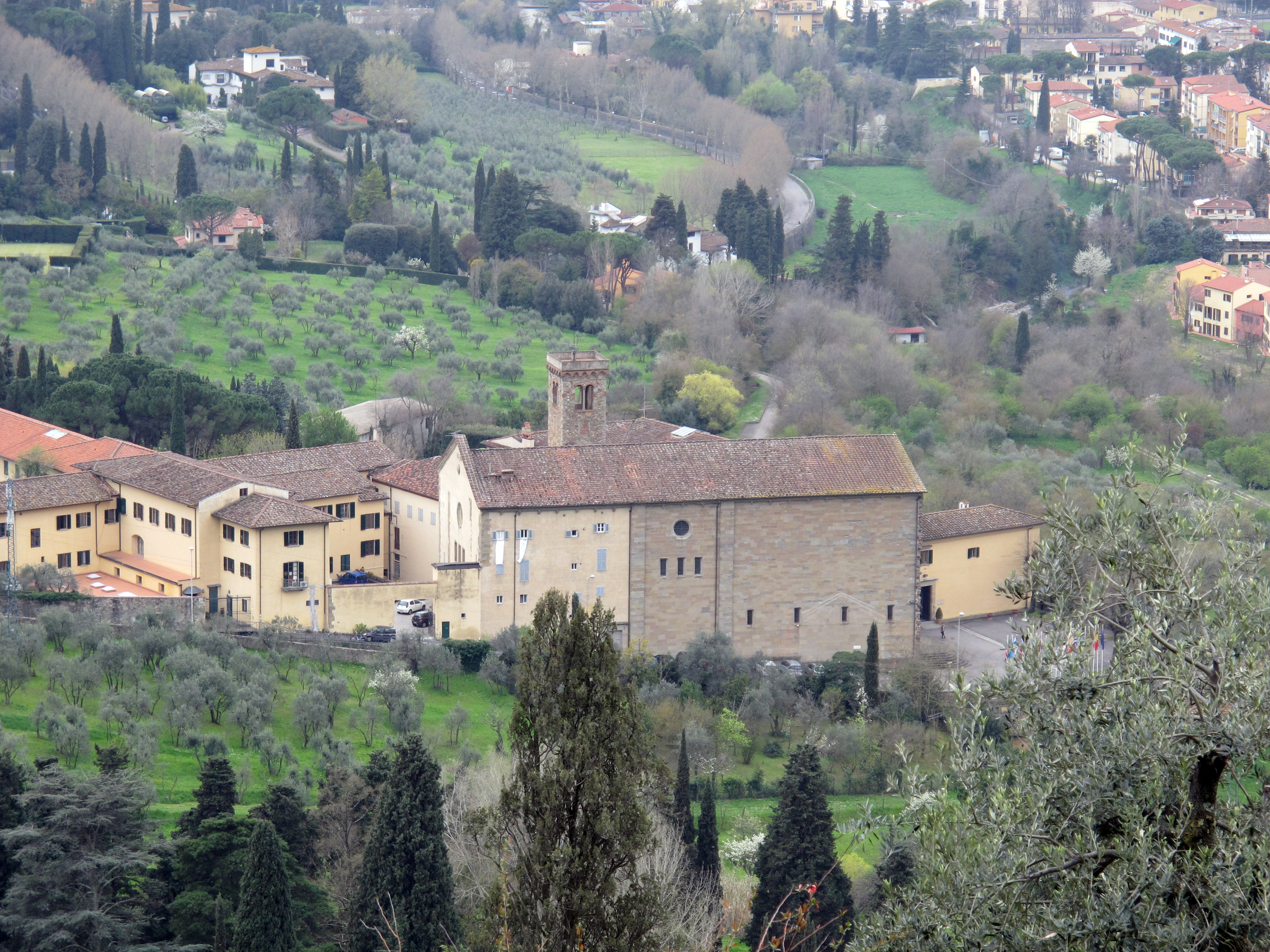
The Badia Fiesolana, where Vermigli entered religious life

Vermigli was born in Florence, the centre of the Florentine Republic, on 8 September 1499 to Stefano di Antonio Vermigli, a wealthy shoemaker, and Maria Fumantina. He was christened Piero Mariano the following day. He was the eldest of three children; his sister Felicita Antonio was born in 1501, and his brother Antonio Lorenzo Romulo was born in 1504. His mother taught him Latin before enrolling him in a school for children of noble Florentines. (Note: The school was run by Marcello Virgilio Adriano.) She died in 1511, when Piero was twelve. Vermigli was attracted to the Catholic priesthood from an early age. In 1514 he became a novice at the Badia Fiesolana, a monastery of the Canons Regular of the Lateran. The Lateran Canons were one of several institutions born out of a fifteenth-century religious reform movement. They emphasised strict discipline, and could be transferred from house to house rather than being bound to stability in one place, as was the custom of Benedictine monasticism. They also sought to provide ministry in urban areas. Peter's sister followed him into the monastic life, becoming a nun the same year.

On completing his novitiate in 1518, Vermigli took the name Peter Martyr after the thirteenth-century Dominican Saint Peter of Verona. The Lateran Congregation had recently decided that promising young ordinands should be sent to the monastery of Saint John of Verdara in Padua to study Aristotle, so Vermigli was sent there. The University of Padua, with which Saint John of Verdera was loosely affiliated, was a highly prestigious institution at the time. At Padua, Vermigli received a thorough training in Thomistic scholasticism and an appreciation for Augustine and Christian humanism. Vermigli was determined to read Aristotle in his original language despite the lack of Greek teachers, so he taught himself. He also made the acquaintance of prominent reform-minded theologians Pietro Bembo, Reginald Pole, and Marcantonio Flaminio.

=== Early Italian ministry (1525–1536) ===
Vermigli was ordained in 1525 and probably received his Doctor of Divinity around that time. The chapter-general of the Congregation elected him to the office of public preacher in 1526. His first series of sermons was in Brescia later that year. He then preached for three years, travelling around northern and central Italy. Unlike the practice of other preaching orders which usually only preached at Lent and Advent, the Augustinians preached year-round. He also gave lectures on the Bible as well as Homer in Lateran Congregation houses.

In 1530 Vermigli was appointed vicar of the monastery at San Giovanni in Monte, Bologna. There he learned Hebrew from a local Jewish doctor so he could read the Old Testament scriptures in their original language. Even among those who sought deeper biblical study, it was uncommon for clergy to learn Hebrew, though not unheard of. In 1533 the chapter-general elected Vermigli abbot of the two Lateran monasteries in Spoleto. (Note: The monasteries were San Giuliano Abbey and Sant'Ansano Monastery (attached to Sant'Ansano Church). San Guiliano was probably abandoned before Vermigli's abbacy.) At this post he was also responsible for two convents. (Note: The convents were San Matteo and La Stella.) The discipline in the monastic houses in Vermigli's care had been lax before his arrival, and they had become a source of scandal in Spoleto. There was also a history of a power struggle between the Bishop of Spoleto, Francesco Eroli, and the Spoletan abbacy, to the point that the bishop had excommunicated Vermigli's predecessor, only to be overturned by Rome. Vermigli brought order to his houses and mended the relationship with the bishop.

The chapter general re-elected Vermigli to the Spoletan abbacy in 1534 and again in 1535, but he was not elected to lead any house the following year. He may have been identified as a promising reformer who could help with reform efforts in higher places. Vermigli was in contact with the Catholic leaders working on the Consilium de emendanda ecclesia, an internal report on potential reforms of the Church commissioned by Pope Paul III. He may have even travelled to Rome to assist in writing it.

=== First controversial preaching and ministry in Lucca (1537–1541) ===
The Congregation elected Vermigli abbot of the monastery at San Pietro ad Aram, Naples in 1537. There he became acquainted with Juan de Valdés, a leader of the spirituali movement. Valdés introduced Vermigli to the writings of Protestant reformers. Toward the end of his time in Naples, he read Martin Bucer's commentaries on the Gospels and the Psalms, and Huldrych Zwingli's De vera et falsa religione. Reading these works was an act of ecclesiastical defiance, but not an uncommon one in reformist circles. Vermigli seems to have slowly moved in a Protestant direction primarily through the study of the Bible and the Church Fathers, especially Augustine. He probably read Protestant literature critically; it was common for those in reform-minded circles to do so while remaining in the Catholic Church. Vermigli embraced the Protestant doctrine of justification by faith alone during this time, and he had probably rejected the traditional Catholic view of the sacraments. Vermigli also seems to have influenced Valdés. Scholars believe that Valdés's strong doctrine of double predestination, that God has chosen some people for salvation and others for damnation, was learned from Vermigli. Vermigli in turn had acquired it from his study of either Gregory of Rimini or Thomas Aquinas at Padua.

Vermigli's move away from orthodox Catholic belief became apparent in 1539 when he preached on 1 Corinthians 3:9–17, a passage commonly used as proof of the doctrine of purgatory. Vermigli did not take this view in his preaching, though he did not openly deny the existence of purgatory. Gaetano da Thiene, an opponent of the spirituali, reported his suspicions of Vermigli to the Spanish viceroy of Naples Don Pedro de Toledo, who prohibited Vermigli's preaching. The prohibition was removed on Vermigli's appeal to Rome, with which he received some help from powerful friends he had made in Padua, such as Cardinals Pole and Bembo. Despite this controversy, Vermigli continued to rise in the Lateran Congregation. He was made one of four visitors by the chapter general in 1540. The visitors assisted the rector general by inspecting the Congregation's religious houses.

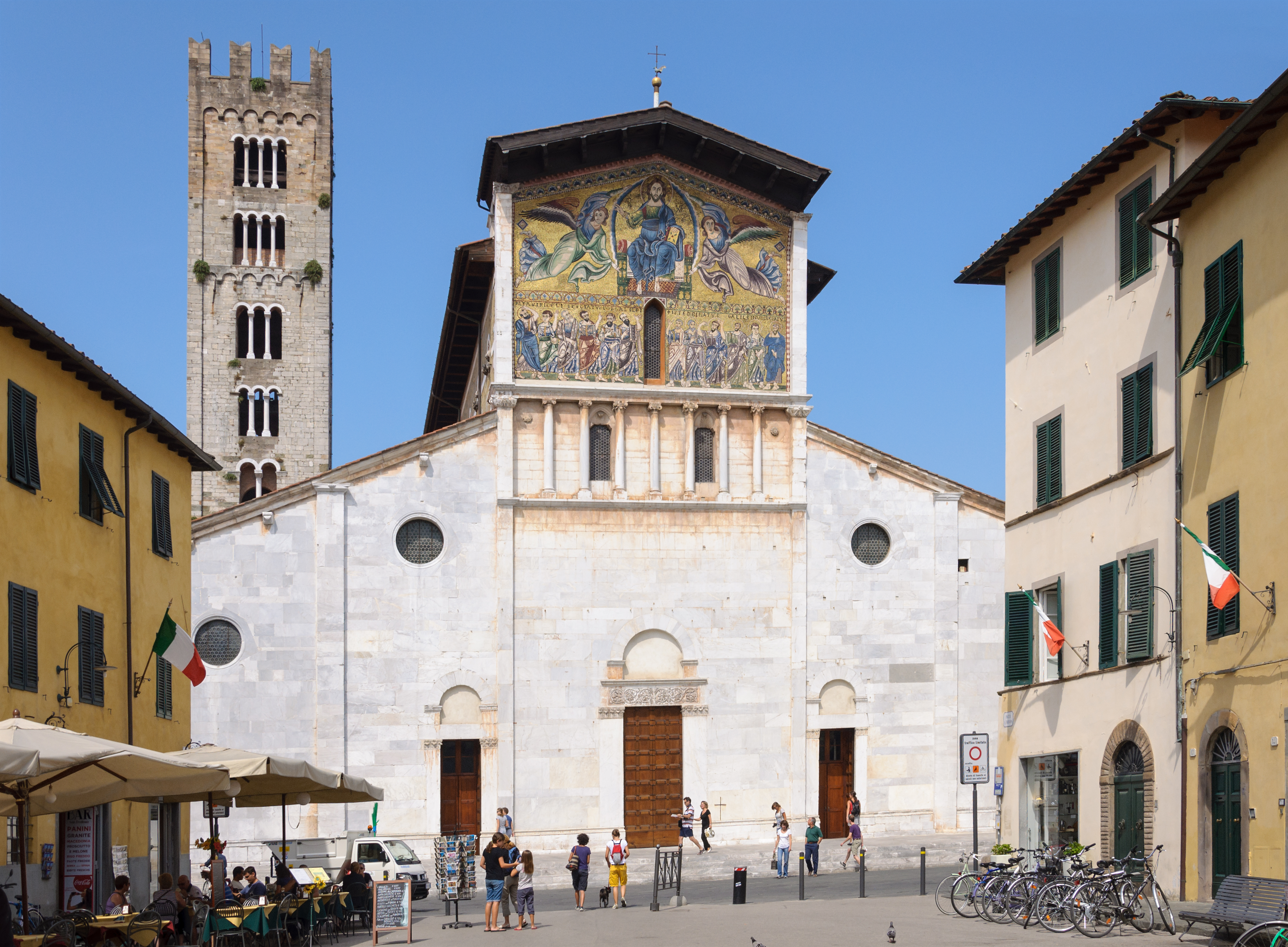
Basilica of San Frediano, where Vermigli was appointed prior in 1541

In 1541 the Congregation elected Vermigli to the important post of prior of Basilica of San Frediano in Lucca. (Note: He succeeded Tommaso da Piacenza.) The prior at San Frediano exercised some episcopal authority over half the city, as well as control of the Lateran's religious houses. As at his earlier post in Spoleto, the monks of the San Frediano monastery, as well as the clergy of Lucca, were known for moral laxity, which led to an openness to the new Lutheran religion there. Vermigli saw his task as one of education as well as moral correction. He set up a college based on humanist principles of education and modelled on the newly founded St John's College, Cambridge, and Corpus Christi College, Oxford. Instruction was in Greek, Latin, and Hebrew. Among the professors were the humanists Immanuel Tremellius, Paolo Lacizi, Celio Secondo Curione, and Girolamo Zanchi, all of whom would later convert to Protestantism. The Congregation recognised Vermigli's work by appointing him to a disciplinary commission of seven canons in May 1542.

=== Flight from Italy and first Strasbourg professorship (1542–1547) ===
Vermigli was widely respected and very cautious. He was able to continue his reform efforts in Lucca without any suspicion of unorthodox views, despite a papal meeting there with Emperor Charles V in 1541. His eventual downfall was caused by two of his followers, one of whom openly questioned papal authority and another who celebrated a Protestant form of the Eucharist. The reconstitution of the Roman Inquisition in 1542 may have been in part a response to the fear that Lucca and other cities would defect from the Catholic Church. The authorities of the Republic of Lucca began to fear that their political independence from the Holy Roman Empire was at stake if their city continued to be viewed as a Protestant haven. Bans on Protestant books heretofore ignored were enforced, religious feasts which had been dropped were reinstated, and religious processions were scheduled to assure Rome of Lucca's loyalty.

Vermigli was summoned to a Chapter Extraordinary of the Lateran Congregation, and his friends warned him that he had powerful adversaries. These increasingly foreboding events contributed to his decision to ignore the summons and flee, but he was finally persuaded by his conscience against the Masses he was bound to perform. Vermigli fled Lucca for Pisa on 12 August 1542 by horse with three of his canons. (Note: The canons were Paolo Lacizi, Teodosio Trebelli and Giulio Santerenziano. Vermigli was succeeded as prior by Francesco da Pavia.) There he celebrated a Protestant form of the Eucharist for the first time. When he stopped in Florence, staying in Badia Fiesolana, where he had entered religious life, Vermigli learned that Bernardino Ochino had arrived there. Vermigli convinced Ochino, a popular preacher with Protestant leanings, to flee Italy as well. On 25 August Vermigli left for Zürich by way of Ferrara and Verona.

Once Vermigli arrived in Zürich he was questioned regarding his theological views by several Protestant leaders, including Heinrich Bullinger, Konrad Pellikan, and Rudolph Gualther. They eventually determined that he could be allowed to teach Protestant theology, but there was no position vacant for him to fill there or in Basel, where he went next. In a letter to his former congregation in Lucca, he explained his motives for leaving and also expressed discouragement at not being able to find a post. Basler humanist Bonifacius Amerbach assisted him with money, and reformer Oswald Myconius recommended him to Martin Bucer in Strasbourg, with whose writings Vermigli was already familiar. Vermigli moved to Strasbourg and became a close personal friend and ally of Bucer, who granted him the chair of Old Testament at the Senior School, succeeding Wolfgang Capito. He began by lecturing on the minor prophets, followed by Lamentations, Genesis, Exodus, and Leviticus. (Note: The lectures on Lamentations and Genesis were published as commentaries, but the lectures on the minor prophets and Exodus have not survived.) Vermigli was delighted to be able to teach from the original-language text of the Old Testament, as many of his students could read Hebrew. He was well-liked by his students and fellow scholars. Vermigli was known for precision, simplicity, and clarity of speech in contrast to Bucer's propensity for digressions which sometimes left his students lost.

Two of Vermigli's former colleagues in Lucca—Lacizi and Tremellius—would join him in Strasbourg. In 1544 he was elected canon of St. Thomas Church, Strasbourg. In 1545 Vermigli married his first wife, Catherine Dammartin, a former nun from Metz. Catherine knew no Italian, and Peter very little German, so it is assumed that they conversed in Latin.

=== England (1547–1553) ===
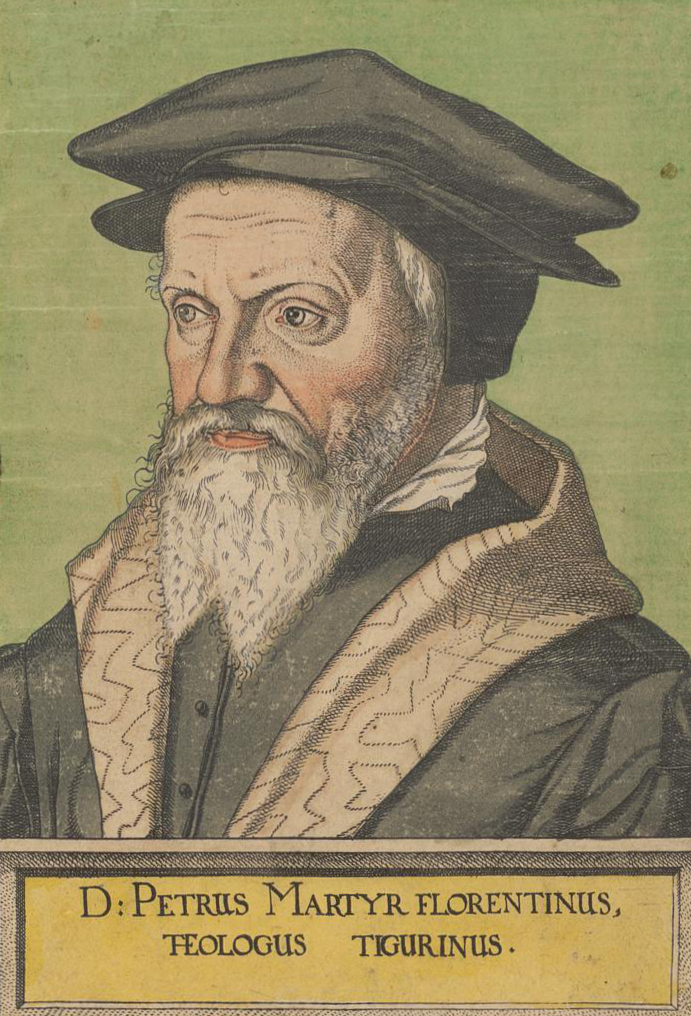
Engraving after a woodcut by Jos Murer

Edward VI acceded to the English throne in 1547, and the Protestant reformers there hoped to take the opportunity to more thoroughly reform the Church of England. Archbishop Thomas Cranmer invited Vermigli and Ochino to assist in the effort. In addition, the victory of the Catholic Emperor Charles V in the Schmalkaldic War and the resulting Augsburg Interim led to a hostile environment for Protestants in Germany. Vermigli accepted the invitation in November and sailed with Ochino to England. In 1548, he replaced Richard Smyth, becoming the second Regius Professor of Divinity at Oxford. This was a very influential post at a university which had been slow to accept reform.

On arriving in Oxford, Vermigli began lecturing on 1 Corinthians, denouncing Catholic doctrines of purgatory, clerical celibacy, and lenten fasting. He then spoke against the Catholic doctrine of the Eucharist, the most sensitive area of disagreement between Protestants and Catholics in England at the time. Conservative faculty, led by Smyth, challenged Vermigli to defend his views in a formal disputation. Smyth fled to St Andrews and finally to Leuven before the disputation could be held, so three Catholic divines, William Tresham, William Chedsey and Morgan Phillips, stepped forward to take his place. The disputation was held in 1549 before Richard Cox, the University Chancellor and a firm Protestant. It focused on the doctrine of transubstantiation, with Vermigli's opponents arguing for it and him against. Chancellor Cox made it obvious that he considered Vermigli to have the better argument, but did not formally declare a winner. The disputation put Vermigli at the forefront of debates over the nature of the Eucharist.

In 1549, a series of uprisings known as the Prayer Book Rebellion forced Vermigli to leave Oxford and take up residence at Lambeth Palace with Cranmer. The rebellion involved conservative opposition to a vernacular liturgy, which was imposed with the Book of Common Prayer at Pentecost in 1549. Rioters in the streets of Oxford threatened Vermigli with death. At Lambeth, Vermigli assisted Cranmer by helping write sermons against the rebellion. After some time, he returned to Oxford, where he was made first canon of Christ Church in January 1551. Vermigli, the first married priest at Oxford, caused controversy by bringing his wife into his rooms overlooking Fish Street at the Great Quadrangle. His windows were smashed several times until he moved to a location in the cloisters, where he built a fortified stone study.

Vermigli became deeply involved in English church politics. In 1550, he and Martin Bucer provided recommendations to Cranmer for additional changes to the Book of Common Prayer's Eucharistic liturgy. Vermigli supported the church's position in the vestarian controversy, over whether bishop John Hooper should be forced to wear a surplice. Vermigli agreed with Hooper's desire to rid the church of elaborate garments, but he did not believe they were strictly prohibited. He advised Hooper to respect the authority of his superiors. Vermigli was probably instrumental in convincing Hooper to drop his opposition in February 1551. In October 1551 he participated in a commission to rewrite the canon law of England. In the Winter he assisted in the writing of a draft set of such laws, which was published by John Foxe as Reformatio legum ecclesiasticarum in 1552.

King Edward died in 1553, followed by the accession of Mary I, who opposed the Protestant reformers. Vermigli was placed under house arrest for six months, and his Catholic opponents at Oxford would likely have had him executed, as Cranmer eventually was in 1556. Despite this risk, he agreed to a public disputation with Cranmer against the new Catholic establishment, but this never came to fruition because Cranmer was imprisoned. Vermigli was able to receive permission from the Privy Council to leave England, and was advised by Cranmer to do so.

Vermigli's wife, Catherine, had become well known in Oxford for her piety and ministry to expectant mothers. She also enjoyed carving faces into plum stones. She had died childless in the February before Vermigli left. Soon after Vermigli's departure, Cardinal Pole had her body disinterred and thrown on a dungheap. Following the accession of the Protestant Queen Elizabeth I in 1558, she was re-interred with the relics of Saint Frithuswith (Frideswide) in Christ Church Cathedral, Oxford.

=== Strasbourg and Zürich (1553–1562) ===
Vermigli arrived in Strasbourg in October 1553, where he was restored to his position at the Senior School and began lecturing on Judges as well as Aristotle's Nicomachean Ethics. Vermigli often gathered with other Marian exiles for study and prayer in his home. His lectures on Judges often addressed the political issues relevant for the exiles, such as the right to resist a tyrant. Since Vermigli's departure and the death of Bucer in 1551, Lutheranism had gained influence in Strasbourg under the leadership of Johann Marbach. Vermigli had been asked to sign both the Augsburg Confession and the Wittenberg Concord as a condition of being reinstalled as professor. He was willing to sign the Augsburg Confession, but not the Concordat, which affirmed a bodily presence of Christ in the Eucharist. He was retained and reappointed anyway, but controversy over the Eucharist, as well as Vermigli's strong doctrine of double predestination, continued with the Lutherans. Another professor in Strasbourg, Girolamo Zanchi, who had converted to Protestantism while under Vermigli in Lucca, shared Vermigli's convictions regarding the Eucharist and predestination. Zanchi and Vermigli became friends and allies. Vermigli's increasing alienation from the Lutheran establishment led him in 1556 to accept an offer from Heinrich Bullinger to teach at the Carolinum school in Zürich. John Jewel, a fellow Marian exile, came along with him.

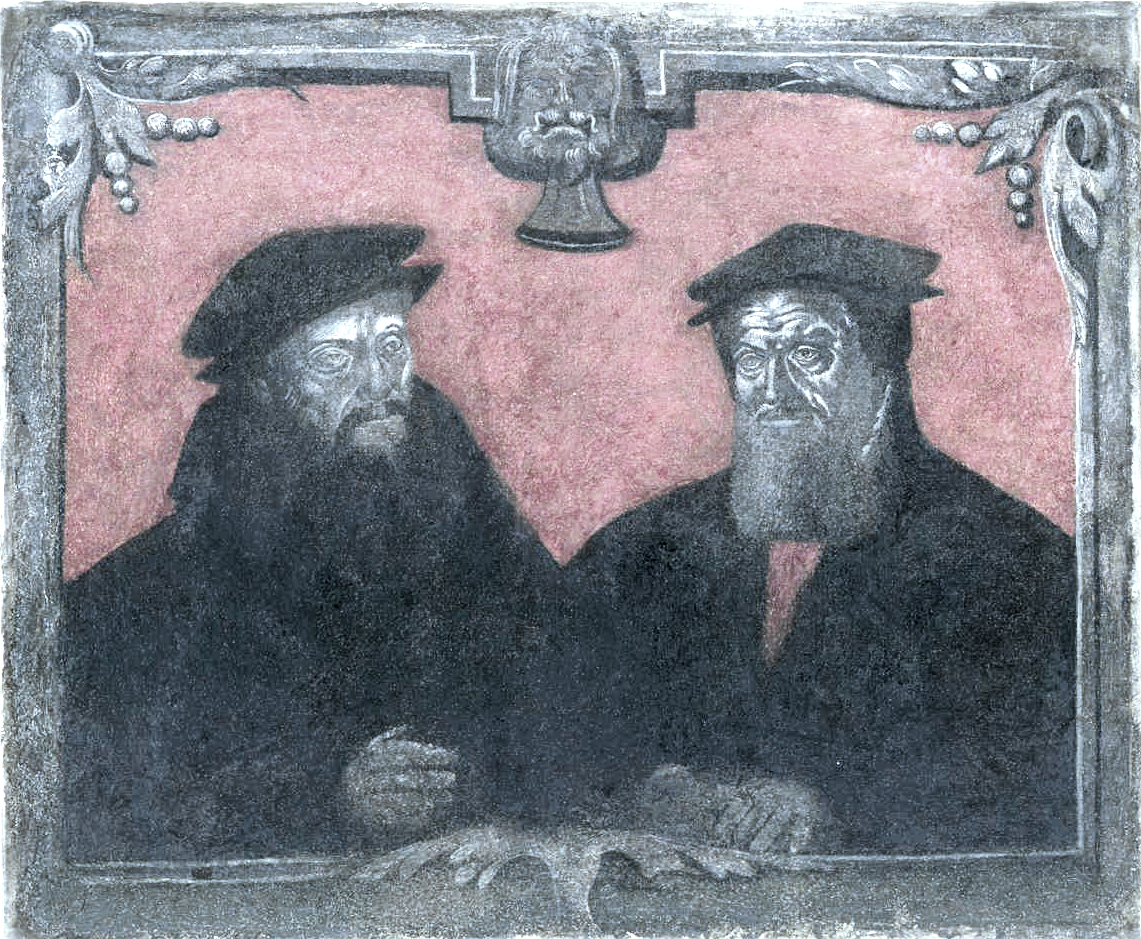
Painting of Vermigli (left) and Theodor Bibliander (right), who strongly disagreed with Vermigli's doctrine of predestination

In Zürich, Vermigli succeeded Konrad Pellikan as the chair of Hebrew, a position he would hold until his death. He married his second wife, Catarina Merenda of Brescia, Italy, in 1559. Vermigli was able to share his teaching duties with fellow Hebraist Theodor Bibliander, allowing him time to study and prepare the notes from his previous lectures for publication. He began lecturing on the books of Samuel and Kings. While in Zürich, Vermigli declined invitations to desirable positions in Geneva, Heidelberg, and England.

Vermigli's Eucharistic views were accepted in Zürich, but he ran into controversy over his doctrine of double predestination. Similarly to John Calvin, Vermigli believed that in some way God wills the damnation of those not chosen for salvation. Vermigli attempted to avoid confrontation over the issue, but Bibliander began to openly attack him in 1557, at one point allegedly challenging him to a duel with a double-edged axe. (Note: Frank A. James, III, writes that the axe duel story "does not seem to have a solid historical ground" citing Joachim Staedke.) Bibliander held the Erasmian view that God only predestines that those who believe in him will be saved, not the salvation of any individual. Reformed theologians during this time held a variety of beliefs about predestination, and Bullinger's position is ambiguous, but they agreed that God sovereignly and unconditionally chooses whom to save. They believed salvation is not based on any characteristic of a person, including their faith. Bullinger and the Zürich church did not necessarily agree with Vermigli's double predestinarian view, but Bibliander's view was deemed unallowable. He was dismissed in 1560, in part to assure other Reformed churches of the Zürich church's orthodoxy. Vermigli was involved in predestinarian controversy again when Zanchi, who had remained in Strasbourg when Vermigli left for Zürich, was accused of heretical teachings on the Eucharist and predestination by the Lutheran Johann Marbach. Vermigli was selected to write the official judgement of the Zürich church on the matter in a statement signed by Bullinger and other leaders in December 1561. His affirmation of a strong doctrine of predestination represented the opinion of the Zürich church as a whole.

Vermigli attended the abortive Colloquy at Poissy in the summer of 1561 with Theodore Beza, a conference held in France with the intention of reconciling Catholics and Protestants. He was able to converse with queen mother of France Catherine de'Medici in her native Italian. He contributed a speech on the Eucharist, arguing that Jesus' words "this is my body" at the Last Supper were figurative rather than literal. Vermigli's health was already declining when he succumbed to an epidemic fever in 1562. He died on 12 November 1562 in his Zürich home, attended by the physician Conrad Gesner. He was buried in the Grossmünster cathedral, where his successor Josias Simler gave a funeral oration, which was published and is an important source for Vermigli's later biographies. Vermigli had two children by his second wife, Caterina, while he was alive, but they did not survive infancy. Four months after his death she had their third child, Maria. (Note: Maria first married Paolo Zanin, then Gorg Ulrich, a minister in Thalwil.)

== Works ==
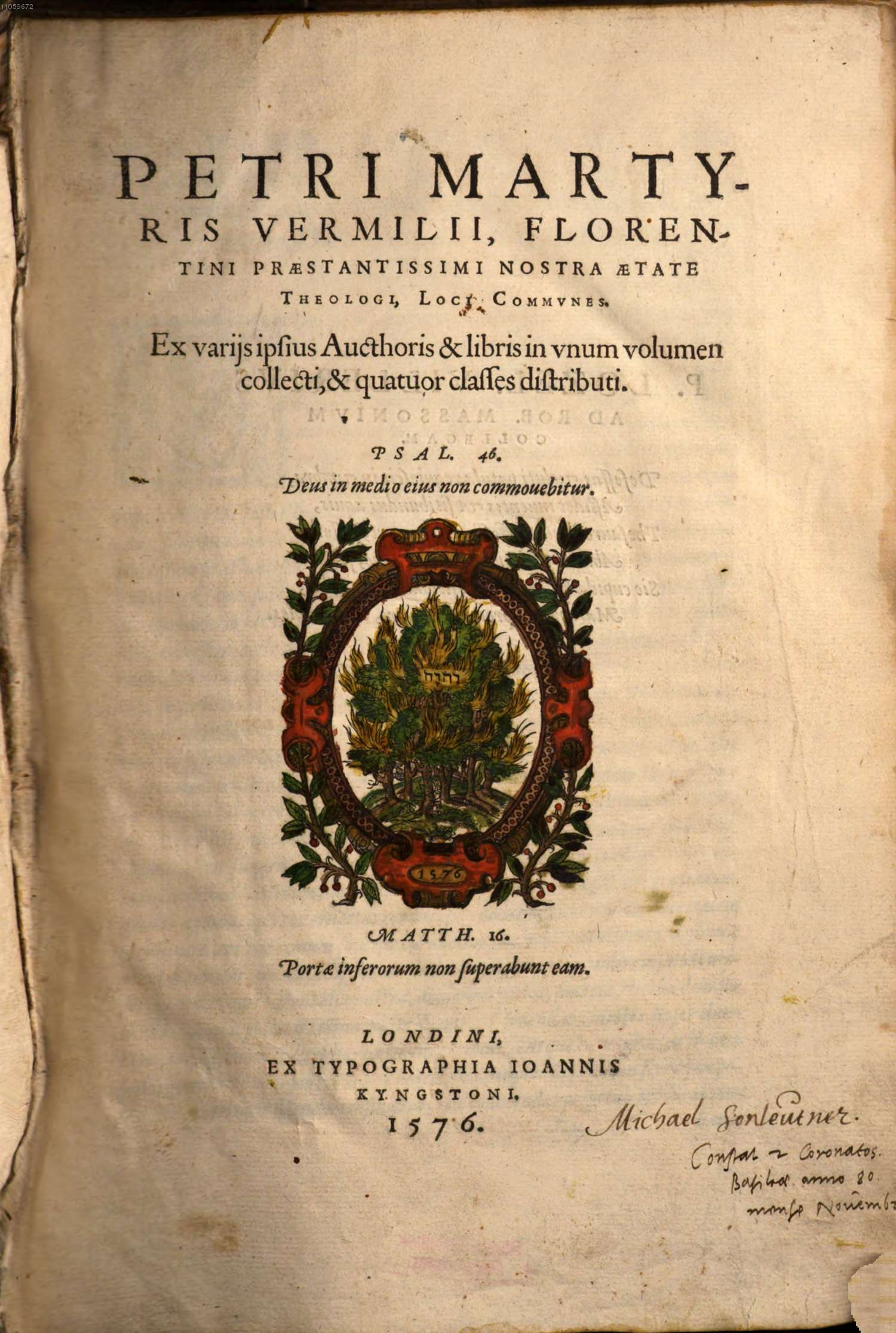
Title page of the 1576 Loci Communes

Vermigli is best known for the Loci Communes (Latin for "commonplaces"), a collection of topical discussions scattered throughout his biblical commentaries. The Loci Communes was compiled by Huguenot minister Robert Masson and first published in 1576, fourteen years after Vermigli's death. Vermigli had apparently expressed a desire to have such a book published, and it was urged along by the suggestion of Theodore Beza. Masson followed the pattern of John Calvin's Institutes of the Christian Religion to organise it. Fifteen editions of the Loci Communes between 1576 and 1656 spread Vermigli's influence among Reformed Protestants. Anthony Marten translated the Loci Communes into English in 1583, adding to it considerably.

Vermigli published commentaries on I Corinthians (1551), Romans (1558), and Judges (1561) during his lifetime. He was criticised by his colleagues in Strasbourg for withholding his lectures on books of the Bible for years rather than sending them to be published. Calling his lecture notes on Genesis, Exodus, Leviticus and the Minor Prophets "brief and hasty annotations", he found it difficult to find time to prepare them for publication. His colleagues edited and published some of his remaining works on the Bible after his death: prayers on the Psalms (1564) and commentaries on Kings (1566), Genesis (1569), and Lamentations (1629). Vermigli followed the humanist emphasis on seeking the original meaning of scripture, as opposed to the often fanciful and arbitrary allegorical readings of the medieval exegetical tradition. He occasionally adopted an allegorical reading to interpret the Old Testament as having to do with Christ typologically, but he did not utilise the quadriga method of medieval biblical interpretation, where each passage has four levels of meaning. Vermigli's command of Hebrew, as well as his knowledge of rabbinic literature, surpassed that of most of his contemporaries, including Calvin, Luther, and Zwingli.

Vermigli published an account of his disputation with Oxford Catholics over the Eucharist in 1549, along with a treatise further explaining his position. The disputation largely dealt with the doctrine of transubstantiation, which Vermigli strongly opposed, but the treatise was able to put forward Vermigli's own Eucharistic theology. Vermigli's Eucharistic views, as expressed in the disputation and treatise, were influential in the changes to the Book of Common Prayer of 1552. Vermigli weighed in again on the Eucharistic controversy in England in 1559. His Defense Against Gardiner was in reply to Stephen Gardiner's 1552 and 1554 Confutatio Cavillationum, itself a reply to the late Thomas Cranmer's work. At 821 folio pages, it was the longest work on the subject published during the Reformation period.

Vermigli's Eucharistic polemical writing was initially directed against Catholics, but beginning in 1557 he began to involve himself in debates with Lutherans. Many Lutherans during this time argued that Christ's body and blood were physically present in the Eucharist because they are ubiquitous, or everywhere. In 1561, Johannes Brenz published a work defending such a view, and Vermigli's friends convinced him to write a response. The result, the Dialogue on the Two Natures in Christ, was written in the form of a dialogue between Orothetes ("Boundary Setter"), a defender of the Reformed doctrine that Christ's body is physically located in Heaven, and Pantachus ("Everywhere"), whose speeches are largely taken directly from Brenz's work. Brenz published a response in 1562, to which Vermigli began to prepare a rebuttal, but he died before he was able to complete it.

== Theology ==
Vermigli was primarily a teacher of scripture rather than a systematic theologian, but his lasting influence is mostly associated with his doctrine of the Eucharist. This can be explained by the close relationship he saw between the exegesis of scripture and theological reflection. Vermigli's method of biblical commentary, similar to that of Martin Bucer, was to include extended discussions of doctrinal topics treated by the biblical texts. Like other Protestants, he believed scripture alone held supreme authority in establishing truth. Nevertheless, he was familiar with the church fathers to a higher degree than many of his contemporaries, and he constantly referred to them. He saw value in the fathers because they had discovered insights into the scriptures that he might not have found, and because many of his Catholic opponents placed great weight on arguments from patristic authority. Often, though, he used the fathers as support for interpretations he had already reached on his own and was not concerned when his interpretation had no patristic precedent.

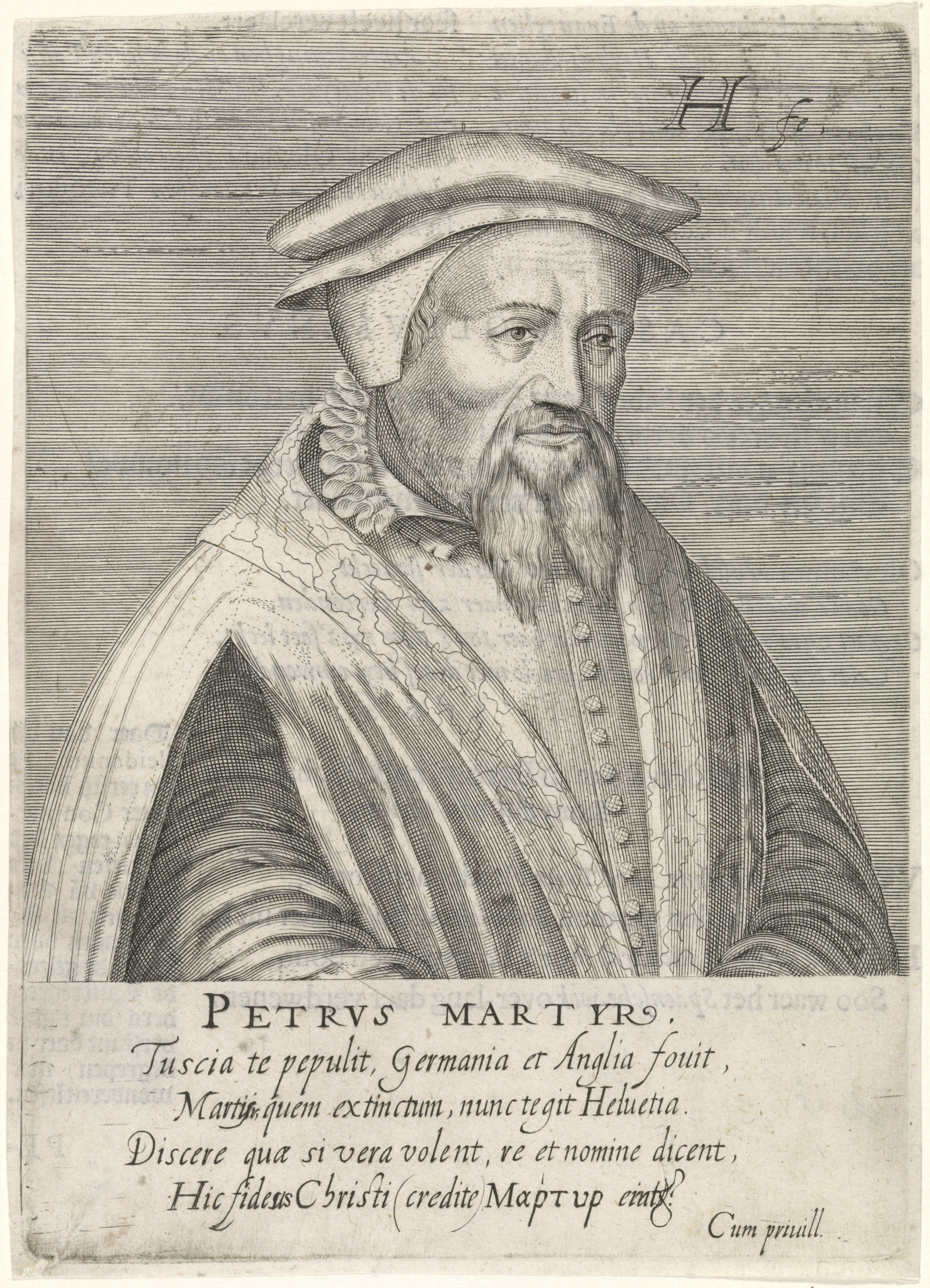
1599 engraving by Hendrik Hondius I

Vermigli is best known for his polemics against the Catholic doctrine of transubstantiation and for the Reformed doctrine of "sacramental presence". He argued that transubstantiation, the belief that the substance of bread and wine are changed into Christ's body and blood, was not based on any argument from scripture. He also argued on the basis of Chalcedonian Christology, that because Christ retained his divine nature when he became man (the divine nature was added to the human nature rather than his human nature being made divine), the substance of the bread and wine remain the same rather than being changed into the substance of Christ's body and blood. Finally, he used the analogy of the believer's union with Christ against the idea of transubstantiation. Because believers retain their human nature even though God has joined them with Christ, it follows that the Eucharistic elements do not need to be transformed to be Christ's body. Instead of the substance of the elements changing into Christ's flesh, Vermigli emphasised the action of the sacrament as an instrument through which Christ is offered to the partaker. He also disagreed with the Anabaptist belief that the Eucharist is simply symbolic or figurative, a view called memorialism or tropism.

Vermigli did not see predestination as central to his theological system, but it became associated with him because of controversies in which he became entangled. Vermigli developed his doctrine independently of John Calvin, and before Calvin published it in his 1559 Institutes of the Christian Religion. Vermigli saw God as sovereign over every event, and believed that all things, including evil, were used by him to accomplish his will. Nevertheless, Vermigli did not hold that humans are compelled to good or evil actions. Vermigli held that God had chosen some people for salvation on the basis of grace or unmerited favour alone, with no consideration for any good or evil characteristics, a view referred to as "unconditional election". Vermigli also believed that God passed over the reprobate, those who were not elected to salvation. He saw this as included in the will of God, but different in character from the decision to choose the elect for salvation. Because all people have fallen into sin, the reprobating will of God treats them as by nature fallen and deserving of damnation. Vermigli's formulation of reprobation as within God's decree while distinct from his saving election was slightly different from Calvin's. Calvin saw predestination to salvation and reprobation as two sides of a single decree. Vermigli's doctrine was to prove more influential in the Reformed confessions. In his early formulation of predestination (ca. 1543–1544), Vermigli drew heavily on Aquinas's Summa theologiae.

Vermigli's biblical writings frequently address political matters. He followed the Aristotelian view that political authority is instituted to promote virtue, and that this includes religion as the chief virtue. Vermigli defended the standard English Protestant doctrine of Royal Supremacy, that kings, so long as they obey God, have the right to rule the church in their land, while Christ is the only head of the universal church. He denied the idea that the pope or any other ecclesiastical authority could exercise authority over a civil ruler such as the king, an important issue at the time given the conflicts between Pope Clement VII and Henry VIII at the beginning of the English Reformation. While Vermigli charged the civil magistrate with enforcing religious duties, he followed Augustine's distinction in the City of God between the spiritual sphere (in Vermigli's words the "inward motions of the mind") and the "outward discipline" of society. The civil magistrate's authority is only on external matters rather than inward and spiritual religious devotion. Vermigli's theological justification for Royal Supremacy was used by the framers of the 1559 Elizabethan Settlement, the imposition of Protestant worship based on the Book of Common Prayer as the state religion.

== Legacy ==
Vermigli's leadership in Lucca left it arguably the most thoroughly Protestant city in Italy. The Inquisition led many of these Protestants to flee, creating a significant population of Protestant refugees in Geneva. Several important leaders in the Reformation can also be tied to Vermigli's work in Lucca, including Girolamo Zanchi and Bernardino Ochino.

Scholars have increasingly recognised the importance of figures other than John Calvin and Huldrych Zwingli in the early formation of the Reformed tradition. Richard Muller, a chief authority on the development of this movement, has argued that Vermigli, Wolfgang Musculus, and Heinrich Bullinger were as influential if not more influential than Calvin on the development of Reformed theology in the sixteenth century. Vermigli was a transitional figure between the Reformation period and the period known as Reformed orthodoxy. In the Reformed orthodox period, the theology first articulated by Reformation figures was codified and systematised. Theologians increasingly resorted to the methods of scholastic theology and the tradition of Aristotelianism. Vermigli was the first of the Reformed scholastic theologians, and he influenced later scholastics Theodore Beza and Girolamo Zanchi.

Vermigli had a profound influence on the English Reformation through his relationship with Thomas Cranmer. Before his contact with Vermigli, Cranmer held Lutheran Eucharistic views. Vermigli seems to have convinced Cranmer to adopt a Reformed view, which changed the course of the English Reformation since Cranmer was primarily responsible for revisions to the Book of Common Prayer and writing the Forty-two Articles. Vermigli had a direct role in the modifications of the Book of Common Prayer of 1552. He is also believed to have contributed to, if not written, the article on predestination found in the Forty-two Articles of Religion of 1553. In Elizabethan Oxford and Cambridge, Vermigli's theology was arguably more influential than that of Calvin. His political theology in particular shaped the Elizabethan religious settlement and his authority was constantly invoked in the controversies of this period.

Various of Vermigli's writings were printed about 110 times between 1550 and 1650. The 1562 Loci Communes became a standard textbook in Reformed theological education. He was popular especially with English readers of theology in the seventeenth century. John Milton probably consulted his commentary on Genesis when writing Paradise Lost. The English edition of the Loci Communes was brought to the Massachusetts Bay Colony where it was an important textbook at Harvard College. More of Vermigli's works were found in the libraries of seventeenth-century Harvard divinity students than those of Calvin. Vermigli's works were highly regarded by New England Puritan theologians such as John Cotton and Cotton Mather.

== Notes and references ==
=== Sources ===
- Amos, N. Scott (2009). "Exegesis and Theological Method". In Kirby, W. J. Torrance; Campi, Emidio; James, Frank A. (eds.). A Companion to Peter Martyr Vermigli. Brill's Companions to the Christian Tradition. Vol. 16. Leiden, The Netherlands: Brill. pp. 175–194. doi:10.1163/ej.9789004175549.i-542.45. ISBN 978-90-474-2898-5.
- Anderson, Marvin W. (1996). "Peter Martyr Vermigli". In Hillebrand, Hans J. (ed.). Oxford Encyclopedia of the Reformation. Oxford: Oxford University Press. doi:10.1093/acref/9780195064933.001.0001. ISBN 978-0-19-518757-1 – via Oxford Reference.
- ——— (1975). Peter Martyr: A Reformer in Exile (1542–1562). Bibliotheca Humanistica & Reformatorica. Vol. X. Nieuwkoop, The Netherlands: B. De Graaf. ISBN 978-90-6004-343-1.
- Balserak, Jon (2009). "I Corinthians Commentary: Exegetical Tradition". In Kirby, W. J. Torrance; Campi, Emidio; James, Frank A. (eds.). A Companion to Peter Martyr Vermigli. Brill's Companions to the Christian Tradition. Vol. 16. Leiden, The Netherlands: Brill. pp. 283–304. doi:10.1163/ej.9789004175549.i-542.69. ISBN 978-90-474-2898-5.
- Baschera, Luca (2007). "Peter Martyr Vermigli on Free Will: the Aristotelian Heritage of Reformed Theology". Calvin Theological Journal. 42 (2): 325–340.
- Benedict, Philip (2002). Christ's Churches Purely Reformed. New Haven: Yale University Press. ISBN 978-0-300-10507-0.
- Boutin, Maurice (2009). "Ex Parte Videntium: Hermeneutics Of The Eucharist". In Kirby, W. J. Torrance; Campi, Emidio; James, Frank A. (eds.). A Companion to Peter Martyr Vermigli. Brill's Companions to the Christian Tradition. Vol. 16. Leiden, The Netherlands: Brill. pp. 195–206. doi:10.1163/ej.9789004175549.i-542.50. ISBN 978-90-474-2898-5.
- Campi, Emidio (2014). Shifting Patterns of Reformed Tradition. Göttingen, Germany: Vandenhoeck & Ruprecht. ISBN 978-3-525-55065-6.
- ——— (2009). "Zurich: Professor In The Schola Tigurina". In Kirby, W. J. Torrance; Campi, Emidio; James, Frank A. (eds.). A Companion to Peter Martyr Vermigli. Brill's Companions to the Christian Tradition. Vol. 16. Leiden, The Netherlands: Brill. pp. 95–114. doi:10.1163/ej.9789004175549.i-542.28. ISBN 978-90-474-2898-5.
- Donnelly, John Patrick (1995). Dialogue on the Two Natures in Christ. Sixteenth Century Essays & Studies. Vol. XXXI. Kirksville, MO: Truman State University Press. ISBN 978-0-940474-33-8.
- ——— (1976). Calvinism and Scholasticism in Vermigli's Doctrine of Man and Grace. Studies in Medieval and Reformation Thought. Vol. XVIII. Leiden, The Netherlands: Brill. ISBN 978-90-04-04482-1.
- Donnelly, John Patrick; James, Frank A.; McLelland, Joseph C., eds. (1999). The Peter Martyr Reader. Kirksville, MO: Truman State University Press. ISBN 978-0-943549-75-0.
- Donnelly, John Patrick, S. J.; Kingdon, Robert M. (1990). A Bibliography of the Works of Peter Martyr Vermigli. Sixteenth Century Essays & Studies. Vol. XIII. Kirksville, MO: Sixteenth Century Journal Publishers. ISBN 978-0-940474-14-7.
- Hobbs, R. Gerald (2009). "Strasbourg: Vermigli and the Senior School". In Kirby, W. J. Torrance; Campi, Emidio; James, Frank A. (eds.). A Companion to Peter Martyr Vermigli. Brill's Companions to the Christian Tradition. Vol. 16. Leiden, The Netherlands: Brill. pp. 35–70. doi:10.1163/ej.9789004175549.i-542.11. ISBN 978-90-474-2898-5.
- James, Frank A. III (2007). "The Bullinger/Vermigli Axis: Collaborators in Toleration and Reformation". In Campi, Emidio; Opitz, Peter (eds.). Heinrich Bullinger, Life — Thought — Influence. Vol. 1. Zurich: Theological Verlag. pp. 165–176. ISBN 978-3-290-17387-6.
- ——— (1998). Peter Martyr Vermigli and Predestination: The Augustinian Inheritance of an Italian Reformer. Oxford: Clarendon Press. ISBN 978-0-19-826969-4.
- Kirby, W. J. Torrance; Campi, Emidio; James, Frank A. (2009). "Introduction". In Kirby, W. J. Torrance; Campi, Emidio; James, Frank A. (eds.). A Companion to Peter Martyr Vermigli. Brill's Companions to the Christian Tradition. Vol. 16. Leiden, The Netherlands: Brill. pp. 1–18. doi:10.1163/ej.9789004175549.i-542.8. ISBN 978-90-474-2898-5.
- Kirby, Torrance (2010). "Peter Martyr Vermigli's Political Theology and the Elizabethan Church". In Ha, Polly; Collinson, Patrick (eds.). The Reception of Continental Reformation in Britain (PDF). Oxford: British Academy. ISBN 978-0-19-726468-3. Archived from the original (PDF) on 2 June 2016.
- ——— (2009). "From Florence to Zürich via Strasbourg and Oxford: The International Career of Peter Martyr Vermigli". In Opitz, Peter; Moser, Christian (eds.). Bewegung und Beharrung: Aspekte des reformierten Protestantismus 1520–1650. Studies in the History of Christian Traditions. Vol. 144. Leiden, The Netherlands: Brill. pp. 135–146. doi:10.1163/ej.9789004178069.i-470.36. ISBN 978-90-474-4042-0 – via Brill Online.
- ——— (2007). "'Vermilius Absconditus': the Zurich portrait". The Zurich Connection and Tudor Political Theology. Studies in the History of Christian Traditions. Vol. 131. Leiden, The Netherlands: Brill. pp. 235–258. doi:10.1163/ej.9789004156180.i-288.18. ISBN 978-90-474-2038-5 – via Brill Online.
- ——— (2004). "Peter Martyr Vermigli and Pope Boniface VIII — The Difference between Civil and Ecclesiastical Power". In James, Frank A. (ed.). Peter Martyr Vermigli and the European Reformations: Semper Reformanda. Boston: Brill. pp. 291–304. ISBN 978-90-04-13914-5.
- McLelland, Joseph C. (2009a). "Italy: Religious and Intellectual Ferment". In Kirby, W. J. Torrance; Campi, Emidio; James, Frank A. (eds.). A Companion to Peter Martyr Vermigli. Brill's Companions to the Christian Tradition. Vol. 16. Leiden, The Netherlands: Brill. pp. 23–34. doi:10.1163/ej.9789004175549.i-542.10. ISBN 978-90-474-2898-5.
- ——— (2009b). "A Literary History of the Loci Communes". In Kirby, W. J. Torrance; Campi, Emidio; James, Frank A. (eds.). A Companion to Peter Martyr Vermigli. Brill's Companions to the Christian Tradition. Vol. 16. Leiden, The Netherlands: Brill. pp. 479–494. doi:10.1163/ej.9789004175549.i-542.129. ISBN 978-90-474-2898-5.
- ——— (2009c). "Conclusion: Vermigli's 'Stromatic' Theology". In Kirby, W. J. Torrance; Campi, Emidio; James, Frank A. (eds.). A Companion to Peter Martyr Vermigli. Brill's Companions to the Christian Tradition. Vol. 16. Leiden, The Netherlands: Brill. pp. 495–498. doi:10.1163/ej.9789004175549.i-542.134. ISBN 978-90-474-2898-5.
- ———, ed. (2000). The Oxford Treatise and Disputation on the Eucharist, 1549. Sixteenth Century Essays & Studies. Vol. LVI. Kirksville, MO: Sixteenth Century Journal Publishers. ISBN 978-0-943549-89-7.
- ——— (1957). The Visible Words of God: An Exposition of the Sacramental Theology of Peter Martyr Vermigli, A.D. 1500–1562. Grand Rapids, MI: Eerdmans. OCLC 4337417.
- McNair, Philip M. J. (1994). "Biographical Introduction". In McClelland, Joseph C. (ed.). Early Writings: Creed, Scripture, Church. Sixteenth Century Essays & Studies. Vol. 30. Kirksville, MO: Sixteenth Century Journal Publishers. ISBN 978-0-940474-32-1.
- ——— (1967). Peter Martyr in Italy: An Anatomy of Apostasy. Oxford: Clarendon. OCLC 849189667.
- Methuen, Charlotte (2009). "Oxford: Reading Scripture in the University". In Kirby, W. J. Torrance; Campi, Emidio; James, Frank A. (eds.). A Companion to Peter Martyr Vermigli. Brill's Companions to the Christian Tradition. Vol. 16. Leiden, The Netherlands: Brill. pp. 71–94. doi:10.1163/ej.9789004175549.i-542.20. ISBN 978-90-474-2898-5.
- Muller, Richard A. (2008) [1986]. Christ and the Decree: Christology and Predestination in Reformed Theology from Calvin to Perkins. Grand Rapids, MI: Baker Academic. ISBN 978-0-8010-3610-1.
- Neelands, David (2009). "Predestination and the Thirty-Nine Articles". In Kirby, W. J. Torrance; Campi, Emidio; James, Frank A. (eds.). A Companion to Peter Martyr Vermigli. Brill's Companions to the Christian Tradition. Vol. 16. Leiden, The Netherlands: Brill. pp. 335–374. doi:10.1163/ej.9789004175549.i-542.99. ISBN 978-90-474-2898-5.
- Overell, M. A. (1984). "Peter Martyr in England 1547–1553: An Alternative View". The Sixteenth Century Journal. 15 (1): 87–104. doi:10.2307/2540841. JSTOR 2540841.
- Rester, Todd M. (2013). "'Dominus dixit': principles of exegetical theology applied in two loci of Peter Martyr Vermigli's I Corinthians commentary". Reformation and Renaissance Review. 15 (1): 9–19. doi:10.1179/1462245913Z.00000000027. S2CID 159808893.
- Schantz, Douglas H. (2004). "Vermigli on Tradition and the Fathers: Patristic Perspectives from His Commentary on I Corinthians". In James, Frank A. (ed.). Peter Martyr Vermigli and the European Reformations: Semper Reformanda. Boston: Brill. pp. 115–138. ISBN 978-90-04-13914-5.
- Steinmetz, David C. (2001). Reformers in the Wings: From Geiler Von Kaysersberg to Theodore Beza (2nd ed.). New York: Oxford University Press. ISBN 978-0-19-513047-8.
- Sytsma, David S. (2018). "Vermigli Replicating Aquinas: An Overlooked Continuity in the Doctrine of Predestination". Reformation and Renaissance Review. 20 (2): 155–167. doi:10.1080/14622459.2018.1470599. S2CID 171529953.
- Taplin, Mark (2004). "Vermigli, Pietro Martire [Peter Martyr] (1499–1562)". Oxford Dictionary of National Biography (online ed.). Oxford University Press. doi:10.1093/ref:odnb/28225. (Subscription, Wikipedia Library access or UK public library membership required.)
- Venema, Cornelius P. (2002). Heinrich Bullinger and the Doctrine of Predestination: Author of "the Other Reformed Tradition"?. Texts and Studies in Post-Reformation Thought. Grand Rapids, MI: Baker Academic. ISBN 978-0-8010-2605-8.
- Wright, David (2009). "Exegesis and Patristic Authority". In Kirby, W. J. Torrance; Campi, Emidio; James, Frank A. (eds.). A Companion to Peter Martyr Vermigli. Brill's Companions to the Christian Tradition. Vol. 16. Leiden, The Netherlands: Brill. pp. 115–132. doi:10.1163/ej.9789004175549.i-542.33. ISBN 978-90-474-2898-5.
- Zuidema, Jason (2011). "Peter Martyr: Protestant Monk?". Reformation and Renaissance Review. 13 (3): 373–386. doi:10.1558/rrr.v13i3.373. S2CID 159676280.
- ——— (2008). Peter Martyr Vermigli (1499–1562) and the Outward Instruments of Divine Grace. Göttingen, Germany: Vandenhoeck & Ruprecht. ISBN 978-3-525-56916-0.

Academic offices
| Preceded by Richard Smyth | Regius Professor of Divinity at Oxford; 1548–1554 | Succeeded by Richard Smyth |
| Preceded by Konrad Pellikan | Chair of Hebrew at the Carolinum, Zürich; 1556–1562 | Succeeded by Josias Simmler |
Religious titles
| Preceded by Tommaso da Piacenza | Prior of San Frediano, Lucca; 1541–1542 | Succeeded by Francesco da Pavia |
| Preceded by William Haynes | Canon of Christ Church Cathedral, First Prebend; 1550–1553 | Succeeded by Richard Bruerne |
