= Peter Martyr Vermigli bibliography =

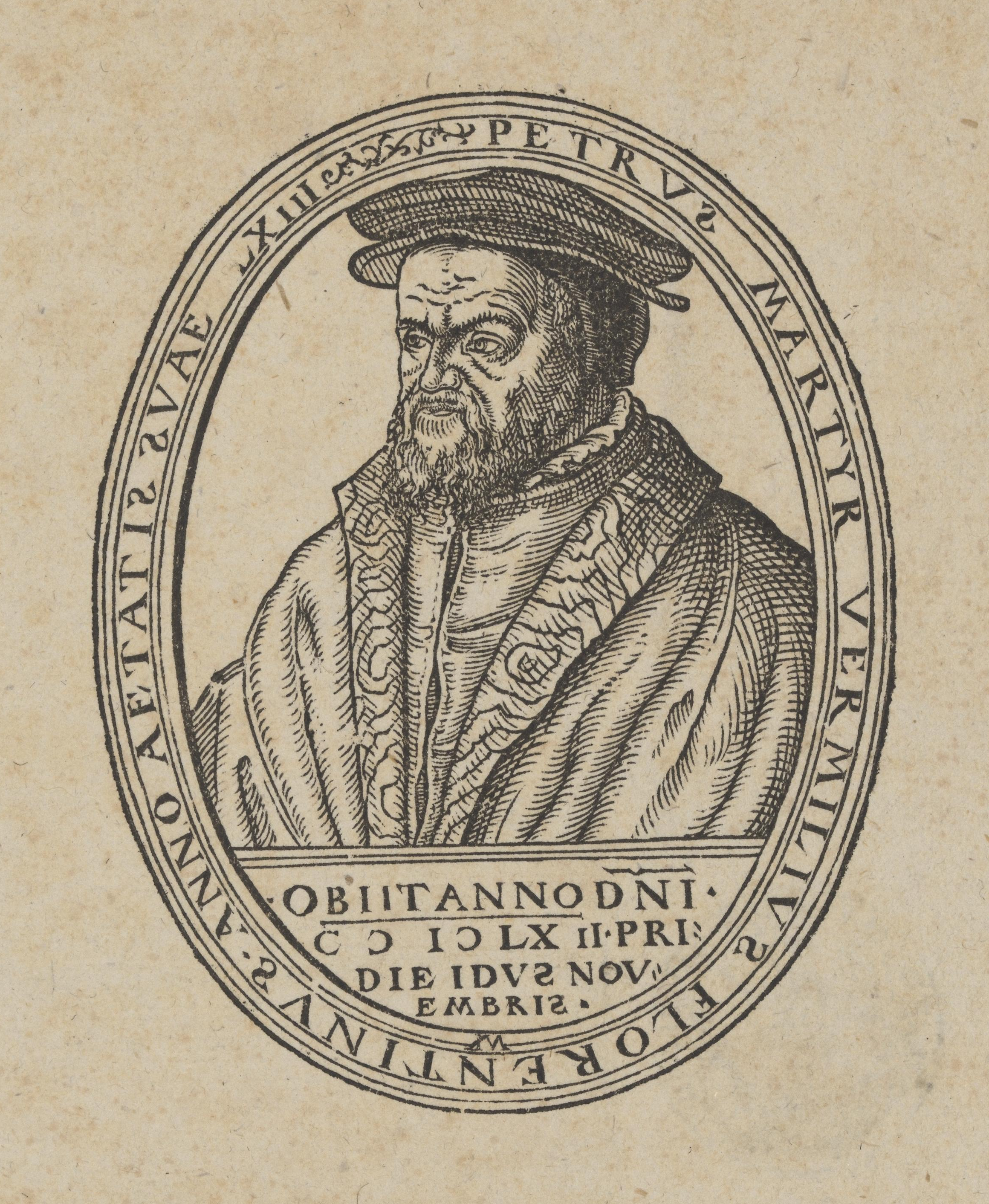
Woodcut by Jos Murer printed in the frontispiece of Josias Simmler's funeral oration for Vermigli

Peter Martyr Vermigli (8 September 1499 – 12 November 1562) was a Reformed theologian of the Reformation period. Born in Florence, he fled Italy to avoid the Roman Inquisition in 1542. He lectured on the Bible in Strasbourg, Zürich and at the University of Oxford. Vermigli was primarily a professor of the Bible, especially the Old Testament. His lectures on I Corinthians, Romans, Judges, Kings, Genesis, and Lamentations were turned into commentaries.

Beginning in 1549, Vermigli became involved in controversy regarding the Eucharist. He published his disputation with Catholics at Oxford University along with a tract on the subject. He later wrote treatises on the Eucharist against Catholics as well as Lutherans. After Vermigli's death, Robert Masson collected the doctrinal passages scattered throughout these commentaries into a systematic theology called the Loci Communes, which became Vermigli's most well-known work. Several of Vermigli's letters and shorter treatises were also published during and after his life. Beginning in 1994, scholars began translating his works into modern English in a series called the Peter Martyr Library.

== Biblical commentaries ==
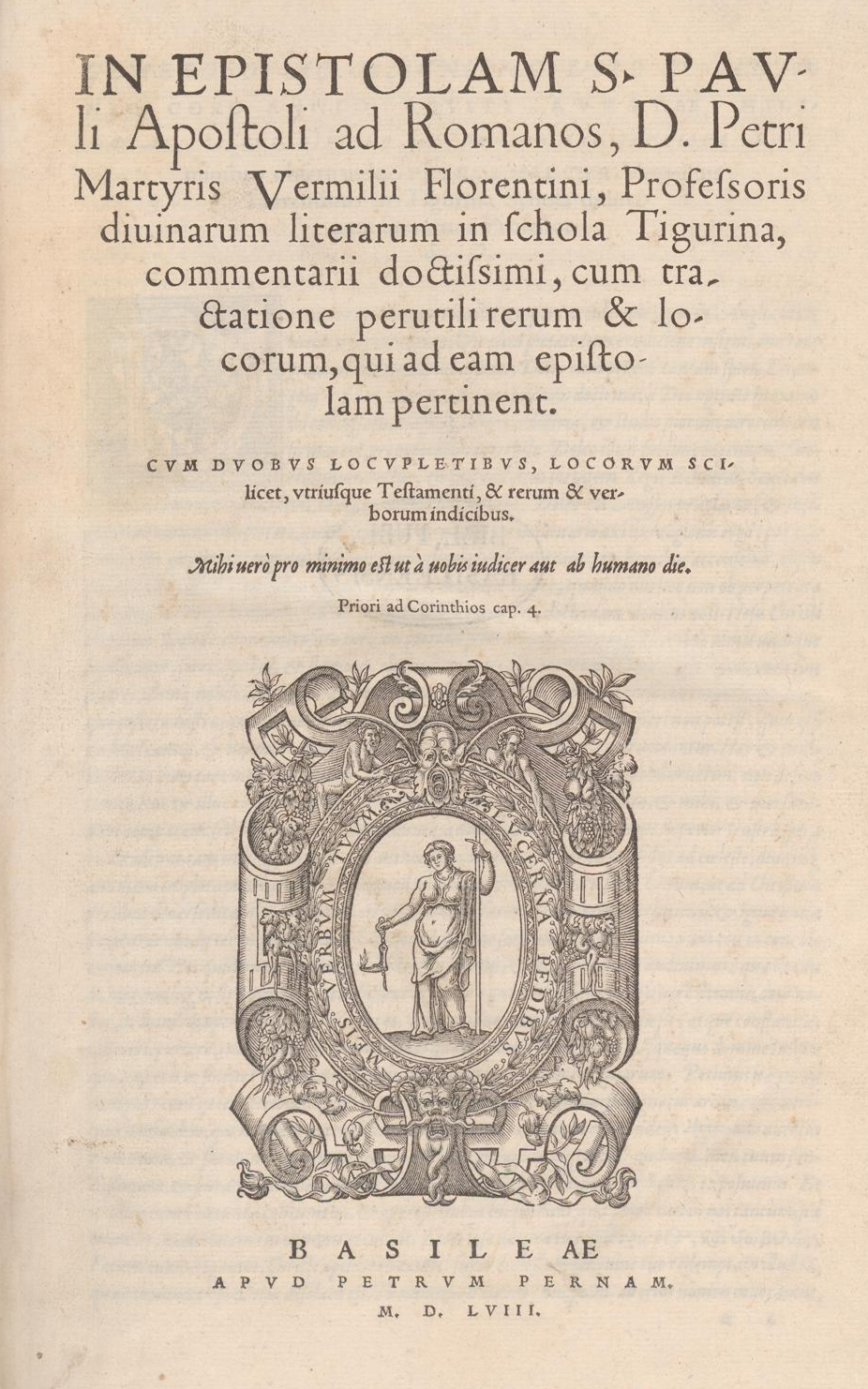
Title page of the 1558 Romans commentary

Vermigli published commentaries on I Corinthians (1551), Romans (1558), and Judges (1561) during his lifetime. He was criticized by his colleagues in Strasbourg for withholding his lectures on books of the Bible for years rather than sending them to be published. Calling his lecture notes on Genesis, Exodus, Leviticus and the Minor Prophets "brief and hasty annotations", he found it difficult to find time to prepare them for publication. His colleagues edited and published some of his remaining works on the Bible after his death: prayers on the Psalms (1564) and commentaries on Kings (1566), Genesis (1569), and Lamentations (1629). Vermigli followed the humanist emphasis on seeking the original meaning of scripture, as opposed to the often fanciful and arbitrary allegorical readings of the medieval exegetical tradition. He occasionally adopted an allegorical reading to interpret the Old Testament as having to do with Christ typologically, but he did not utilize the quadriga method of medieval biblical interpretation, where each passage has four levels of meaning. Vermigli's command of Hebrew, as well as his knowledge of rabbinic literature, surpassed that of most of his contemporaries, including John Calvin, Martin Luther, and Huldrych Zwingli.

Vermigli's biblical commentaries
Book of Bible	Latin short title (Note: As given in Donnelly & Kingdon 1990)	Year of first publication	First edition publisher	Notes
First Corinthians	In selectissimam D. Pauli Priorem ad Corinth. epistolam Commentarij...	1551	Zürich: C. Froschauer	1548–1549 Oxford lectures
Romans	In Epistolam S. Pauli Apostoli ad Romanos commentarij doctissimi...	1558	Basel: P. Perna	1550–1552 Oxford lectures
Judges	In Librum Iudicum...Commentarij doctissimi...	1561	Zürich: C. Froschauer	1554–1556 Strasbourg lectures
Samuel	In duos Libros Samuelis Prophetae...Commentarii doctissimi...	1564	Zürich: C. Froschauer	1556 Zürich lectures
Psalms	Preces Sacrae ex Psalmis Davidis desumptae...	1564	Zürich: C. Froschauer	Prayers to close lectures during Schmalkaldic War
Kings	Melachim id est, Regum Libri Duo posteriores cum Commentarijs.	1566	Zürich: C. Froschauer	1560–1562 Zürich lectures
Genesis	In Primum Librum Mosis, qui vulgo Genesis dicitur Commentarii doctissimi...	1569	Zürich: C. Froschauer	1542–1547 Strasbourg lectures; ends at Genesis 42:25
Lamentations	In lamentationes sanctissimi Ieremiae prophetae...	1629	Zürich: Ioh. Iacobus Bodmerus	

== Major theological and philosophical works ==
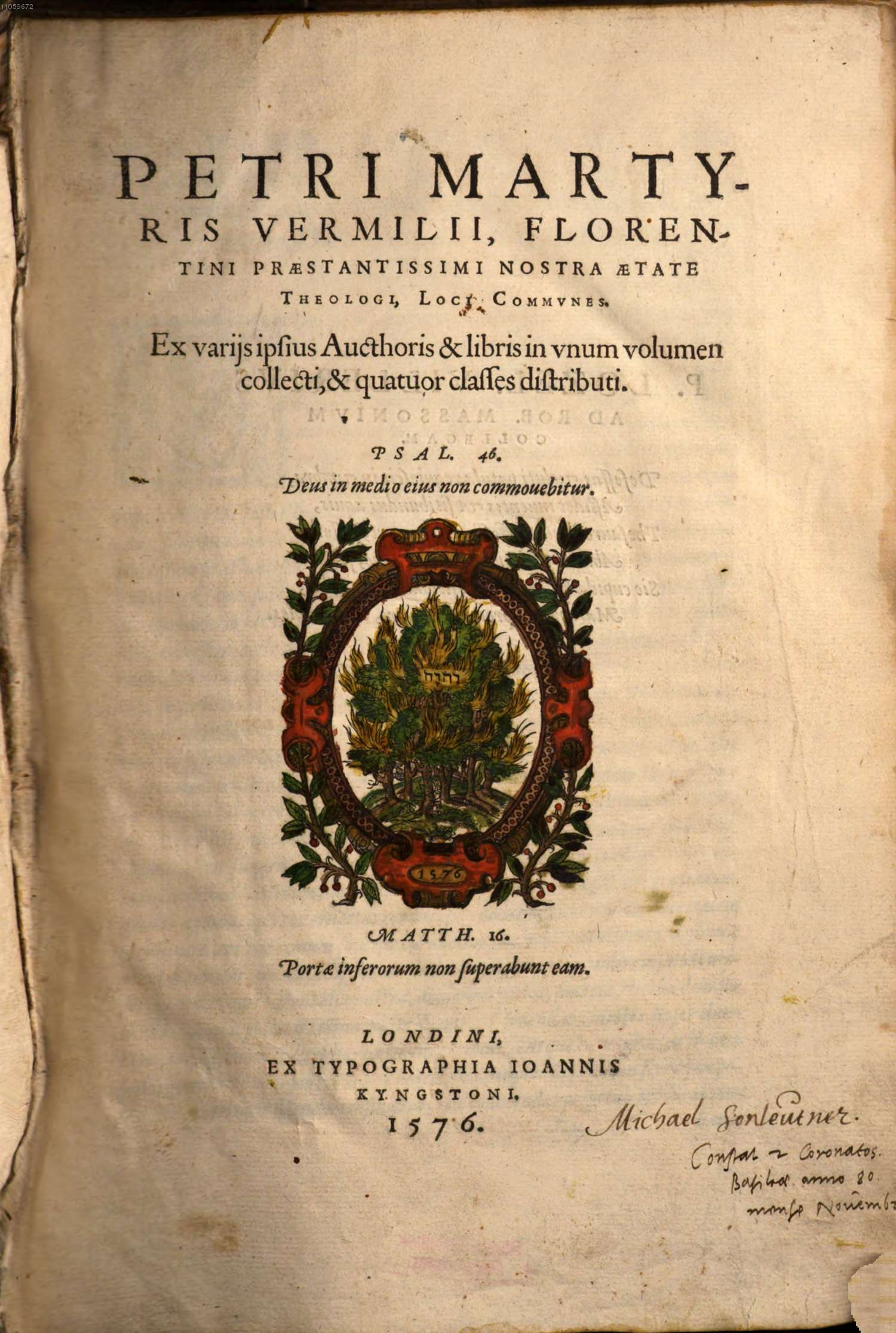
Title page of the 1576 Loci Communes

Vermigli's best known work is the Loci Communes (Latin for "commonplaces"), a collection of the topical discussions scattered throughout his biblical commentaries. The Loci Communes was compiled by Huguenot minister Robert Masson and first published in 1576, fourteen years after Vermigli's death. Vermigli had apparently expressed a desire to have such a book published, and it was urged along by the suggestion of Theodore Beza. Masson followed the pattern of John Calvin's Institutes of the Christian Religion to organize it. Fifteen editions of the Loci Communes spread Vermigli's influence among Reformed Protestants. Anthony Marten translated the Loci Communes into English in 1583, with considerable additional excerpts from Vermigli's works.

Vermigli published an account of his disputation with Oxford Catholics over the Eucharist in 1549, along with a treatise further explaining his position. The disputation largely dealt with the doctrine of transubstantiation, which Vermigli strongly opposed, but the treatise was able to put forward Vermigli's own Eucharistic theology. He weighed in again on Eucharistic controversy in England in 1559. His Defense Against Gardiner was in reply to Stephen Gardiner's 1552 and 1554 Confutatio Cavillationum, itself a reply to the late Thomas Cranmer's work. At 821 folio pages, it was the longest work on the subject published during the Reformation period.

Vermigli's Eucharistic polemical writing was initially directed against Catholics, but beginning in 1557 he began to involve himself in debates with Lutherans. Many Lutherans during this time argued that Christ's body and blood were physically present in the Eucharist because they are ubiquitous, or everywhere. In 1561, Johannes Brenz published a work defending such a view, and Vermigli's friends convinced him to write a response. The result, the Dialogue on the Two Natures in Christ, was written in the form of a dialogue between Orothetes ("Boundary Setter"), a defender of the Reformed doctrine that Christ's body is physically located in heaven, and Pantachus ("Everywhere"), whose speeches are largely taken directly from Brenz's work. Brenz published a response in 1562, to which Vermingli began to prepare a rebuttal, but he died before he was able to complete it.

Vermigli's theological and philosophical works
English title	Latin short title	Year of first publication	First edition publisher	Notes
Tract and Disputation on the Eucharist	Tractatio de sacramento eucharistiae, habita in universitate Oxoniensi. Ad hec. Disputatio habita M.D. XLIX	1549	London: R. Wolfe	1549 Oxford disputation
Defense Against Smith on Celibacy	Defensio...ad Riccardi Smythaei...duos libellos de Caelibatu sacerdotum & Votis monasticis...	1559	Basel: P. Perna	
Defense Against Gardiner on the Eucharist	Defensio Doctrinae veteris & Apostolicae de sacrosancto Eucharstiae Sacramento...adversus Stephani Gardineri...librum...	1559	Zürich: C. Froschauer	
Dialogue on the Two Natures in Christ Against Brenz	Dialogus de utraque in Christo Natura...	1561	Zürich: C. Froschauer	Reply to Johann Brenz's 1560 work
Commentary in Aristotle's Ethics	In primum, secundum, et initium tertii libri Ethicorum Aristotelis ad Nicomachum...Commentarius doctissimus.	1563	Zürich: C. Froschauer	1553–1556 Strasbourg lectures
Loci Communes	Loci Communes. Ex variis ipsius Auchthoris libris in unum volumen collecti, & quatuor classes distributi...	1576	London: John Kyngston	Compiled by Robert Masson

== Minor works ==
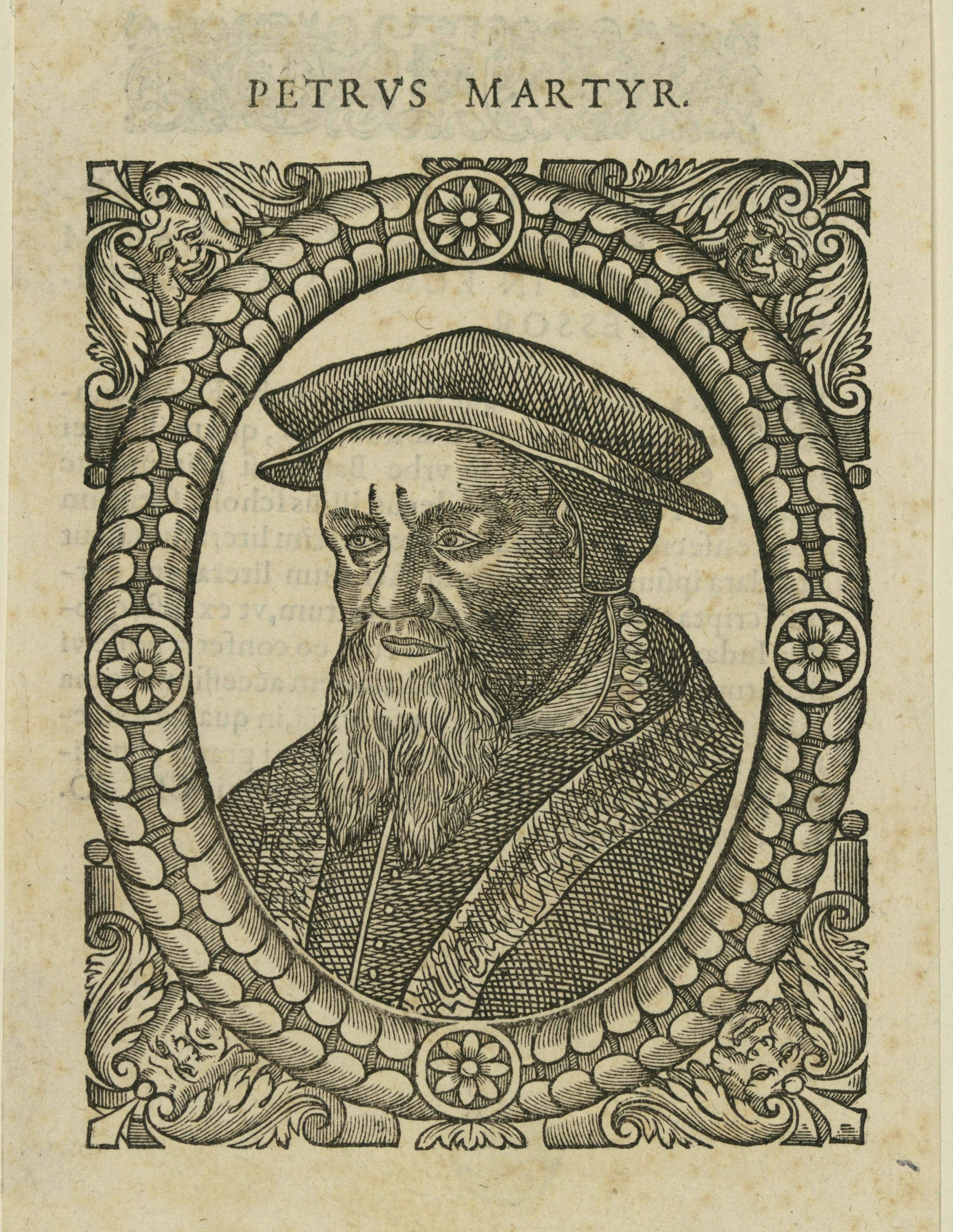
Woodcut from Theodore Beza's 1580 Icones

329 of Vermigli's letters (sent and received) are preserved, written over the period 1542 to 1562. (Note: He exchanged 50 letters with Bullinger, 46 with Calvin, 13 with others of his colleagues in Zurich, 9 with Beza, 53 with various of the English reformers, 21 with Bucer, and 17 with Jan Utenhove, with the remaining exchanged with other correspondents.) Many of these were for the purpose of exchanging news about the conditions in England, where Protestants suffered persecution under Mary, but they often discussed theological matters as well. His opinion carried a great deal of authority in the Reformed community, especially on the Eucharist. Vermigli used his letters to clarify his position and safeguard the Reformed consensus on the Eucharist against harmful divisions.

Vermigli's minor works
Short title	Year of first publication	First edition publisher	Subject
Una semplice Dichiatoratione sopra gli XII Articoli della Fede Christiana	1544	Basel: Johan Hervagius	Explanation of Apostles' Creed
An Epistle unto the right honorable...duke of Somerset...	1550	London: N. Hill	Consolatory letter to Edward Seymour on his fall from power as Lord Protector
A Treatise of the cohabitacyon of the faithfull with the unfaithfull	1555	Strasbourg: W. Rihel	Against Nicodemism
Epistolae Duae, ad Ecclesias Polonicas, Iesu Christi...de negotio Stancariano...	1561	Zürich: C. Froschauer	Two letters to the Polish Reformed Church against the views of Francesco Stancaro
Epistre escritte par P. Martir avant son decez, à un sien amy grand seigneur, Traduitte de Latin en françois	1565	No place or publisher	French translation of a letter
Trattato della vera chiesa catholica, et della nenessitá di viver in essa.	1573	Geneva: no publisher	Ecclesiology
Epistre...a quelques fideles touchant leur abiuration & renoncement de la verité.	1574	No place or publisher	French translation of a letter
A briefe treatise, concerning the use and abuse of Dauncing...	1580	London: John Jugge	Dancing
Sendbrieff...an seine Evangelische Brüder Statt Luca.....	1624	No place or publisher	Letter to his former congregation in Lucca
An Unpublished Letter of...to Henry Bullinger	1850	London: J. Hatchard and Son	Letter to Bullinger on sacramental offerings

== Modern English translations ==
The Peter Martyr Library is an ongoing effort to translate Vermigli's works into modern English. The series is jointly published by Sixteenth Century Journal Publishers and Truman State University Press in Kirksville, Missouri, beginning in 1994.

Peter Martyr Library
Volume	Title	Year of publication	Notes
1	Early Writings: Creed, Scripture, Church	1994	Explanation of the Apostles' Creed, some theses for disputation (originally published with the Loci Communes), and an excerpt from the Kings commentary
2	Dialogue on the Two Natures in Christ	1995	
3	Sacred Prayers Drawn From the Psalms of David	1996	Original title: Preces Sacrae ex Psalmis Davidis desumptae...
4	Philosophical Works: on the Relation of Philosophy to Theology	1999	Excerpts from the commentary on Aristotle and biblical commentaries with philosophical themes
5	Life, Letters, and Sermons	1999	Includes Josias Simmler's funeral orration for Vermigli with some of Vermigli's sermons and letters
6	Commentary on the Lamentations of the Prophet Jeremiah	2002	
7	The Oxford Treatise and Disputation on the Eucharist	2000	
8	Two Theological Loci: Predestination and Justification	2004	Excerpts from the Romans commentary
9	Commentary on Aristotle’s Nicomachean Ethics	2006	

The Davenant Institute announced in 2017 a project to translate an abridged edition of the Loci Communes into English. It is to be published in installments beginning in 2018 and is expected to be completed in 2025.

== Notes and references ==
=== Sources ===
- Balserak, Jon (2009). "I Corinthians Commentary: Exegetical Tradition". In Kirby, W. J. Torrance; Campi, Emidio; James, Frank A. (eds.). A Companion to Peter Martyr Vermigli. Brill's Companions to the Christian Tradition. Vol. 16. Leiden, The Netherlands: Brill. pp. 283–304. doi:10.1163/ej.9789004175549.i-542.69. ISBN 978-90-474-2898-5.
- Campi, Emidio (2014). Shifting Patterns of Reformed Tradition. Göttingen, Germany: Vandenhoeck & Ruprecht. ISBN 978-3-525-55065-6.
- ——— (2009). "Zurich: Professor In The Schola Tigurina". In Kirby, W. J. Torrance; Campi, Emidio; James, Frank A. (eds.). A Companion to Peter Martyr Vermigli. Brill's Companions to the Christian Tradition. Vol. 16. Leiden, The Netherlands: Brill. pp. 95–114. doi:10.1163/ej.9789004175549.i-542.28. ISBN 978-90-474-2898-5.
- Davenant Institute (31 May 2017). "Announcing a New Project to Translate Vermigli's Common Places".
- Donnelly, John Patrick, S. J.; Kingdon, Robert M. (1990). A Bibliography of the Works of Peter Martyr Vermigli. Sixteenth Century Essays & Studies. Vol. XIII. Kirksville, MO: Sixteenth Century Journal Publishers. ISBN 978-0-940474-14-7.
- Donnelly, John Patrick (1995). Dialogue on the Two Natures in Christ. Sixteenth Century Essays & Studies. Vol. XXXI. Kirksville, MO: Trueman State University Press. ISBN 978-0-940474-33-8.
- ——— (1976). Calvinism and Scholasticism in Vermigli's Doctrine of Man and Grace. Studies in Medieval and Reformation Thought. Vol. XVIII. Leiden, The Netherlands: Brill. ISBN 978-90-04-04482-1.
- Hobbs, R. Gerald (2009). "Strasbourg: Vermigli and the Senior School". In Kirby, W. J. Torrance; Campi, Emidio; James, Frank A. (eds.). A Companion to Peter Martyr Vermigli. Brill's Companions to the Christian Tradition. Vol. 16. Leiden, The Netherlands: Brill. pp. 35–70. doi:10.1163/ej.9789004175549.i-542.11. ISBN 978-90-474-2898-5.
- Kirby, W. J. Torrance; Campi, Emidio; James, Frank A. (2009). "Introduction". In Kirby, W. J. Torrance; Campi, Emidio; James, Frank A. (eds.). A Companion to Peter Martyr Vermigli. Brill's Companions to the Christian Tradition. Vol. 16. Leiden, The Netherlands: Brill. pp. 1–18. doi:10.1163/ej.9789004175549.i-542.8. ISBN 978-90-474-2898-5.
- ——— (2007). "Introduction". The Zurich Connection and Tudor Political Theology. Studies in the History of Christian Traditions. Vol. 131. Leiden, The Netherlands: Brill. pp. 1–24. doi:10.1163/ej.9789004156180.i-288.7. ISBN 978-90-474-2038-5.
- Lim, Paul C. H. (2012). Mystery Unveiled: The Crisis of the Trinity in Early Modern England. Oxford: Oxford University Press. doi:10.1093/acprof:oso/9780195339468.001.0001. ISBN 9780195339468.
- McLelland, Joseph C. (2009a). The Oxford Treatise and Disputation on the Eucharist, 1549. Sixteenth Century Essays & Studies. Vol. LVI. Kirksville, MO: Trueman State University Press. ISBN 978-0-943549-89-7.
- ——— (2009b). "A Literary History of the Loci Communes". In Kirby, W. J. Torrance; Campi, Emidio; James, Frank A. (eds.). A Companion to Peter Martyr Vermigli. Brill's Companions to the Christian Tradition. Vol. 16. Leiden, The Netherlands: Brill. pp. 479–494. doi:10.1163/ej.9789004175549.i-542.129. ISBN 978-90-474-2898-5.
- Moser, Christian (2009). "Epistolary: Theological Themes". In Kirby, W. J. Torrance; Campi, Emidio; James, Frank A. (eds.). A Companion to Peter Martyr Vermigli. Brill's Companions to the Christian Tradition. Vol. 16. Leiden, The Netherlands: Brill. pp. 433–456. doi:10.1163/ej.9789004175549.i-542.113. ISBN 978-90-474-2898-5.
- Zuidema, Jason (2009). "Vermigli Studies Bibliography". In Kirby, W. J. Torrance; Campi, Emidio; James, Frank A. (eds.). A Companion to Peter Martyr Vermigli. Brill's Companions to the Christian Tradition. Vol. 16. Leiden, The Netherlands: Brill. pp. 499–518. doi:10.1163/ej.9789004175549.i-542.139. ISBN 978-90-474-2898-5.
- ——— (2008). Peter Martyr Vermigli (1499–1562) and the Outward Instruments of Divine Grace. Göttingen, Germany: Vandenhoeck & Ruprecht.
