= Loci communes (disambiguation) =

Loci communes is a book by Philip Melanchthon.

Loci communes may also refer to:

- Loci theologici, a rhetorical method
- Loci communes (Pseudo-Maximus), an anonymous Greek florilegium
- Loci communes, a major work in the Peter Martyr Vermigli bibliography
- Loci Communes (Antonius Melissa), an 11th-century compilation of moral sentences
