= Paolo Lazise =

Italian humanist and theologian

- Born: Paolo Bevilacqua; 1508; Verona, Italy
- Died: January 1544 (aged 35–36); Strasbourg
- Education: University of Padua

Paolo Lazise (or Lazici, Latin: Paulus Lacisius; 1508 - January 1544), was an Italian humanist and theologian. A Canon Regular of the Lateran, he later converted to Protestantism, taking refuge in Strasbourg, where he was appointed professor of Greek.

== Biography ==
He was born Paolo Bevilacqua in Verona in 1508 to Francesca Pilcante and Zeno Bevilacqua, a nobleman of Lazise, a town on Lake Garda. In 1528, he entered the monastery of San Leonardo outside the walls of Verona, where he began his studies in humanities, which he continued at the University of Padova and later in the monastery of San Giovanni di Verdara.

He was made a preacher of his order in 1537. In 1540 he participated in the General Chapter of the Order held in Ravenna, where he met Peter Martyr Vermigli. When Peter was elected prior of San Frediano monastery in 1541 he set up a college based on humanist principles of education, with Lazise employed as a teacher of Latin. Among his colleagues there were Celso Martinengo, a professor of Greek and Immanuel Tremellius, a Jewish convert to Christianity who taught Hebrew. In Lucca, Lazise also met humanist Celio Secondo Curione. Lazise also worked as a private tutor, but he continued his preaching efforts and collaborated with Francesco Robortello, a professor at the University of Lucca, in the preparation of a commentary on the Poetics of Aristotle.

In July 1542, Cardinal Bartolomeo Guidiccioni, Inquisitor of the Holy Office, denounced the government of Lucca and Curione and teachers of the school of San Frediano as heretical and subversive of the Republic. The following August, while Curione took refuge in Lausanne, Lazise, Vermigli, his pupil Giulio Terenziano and Tremellius fled to Basel and from there to Strasbourg, where Lazise obtained a teaching position in Greek through the efforts of Martin Bucer.

== Death ==
Lazise died prematurely in January 1544, only a year after taking office. His only work is the Latin translation of "Chilliades" (translated in Latin as Variarum historiarum liber) by the 12th century Greek grammarian John Tzetzes, which was published posthumously in 1546.

== Works ==
- Ioannis Tzetzae variarum historiarum liber, versibus politicis ab eodem graece conscriptus, et Pauli Lacisii veronensis opera ad verbum latine conversus, nuncquam primum in lucem editus, Basileae, ex officina Ioannis Oporini, 1546.

== Bibliography ==
- Francesco Robortello, In librum Aristotelis de arte poetica explicationes, Basileae, per Ioannem Heruagium iuniorem 1555
- Frederic C. Church, I riformatori italiani, (1933), Milano, Il Saggiatore 1967
- Lorenzo Tacchella, Il processo agli eretici veronesi nel 1550. S. Ignazio di Loyola e Luigi Lippomano (carteggio), Brescia, Morcelliana 1979
- Simonetta Adorni Braccesi, "Una città infetta". La Repubblica di Lucca nella crisi religiosa del Cinquecento, Firenze, Olschki 1994
