= Beneficio di Cristo =

1543 book by Benedetto Fontanini

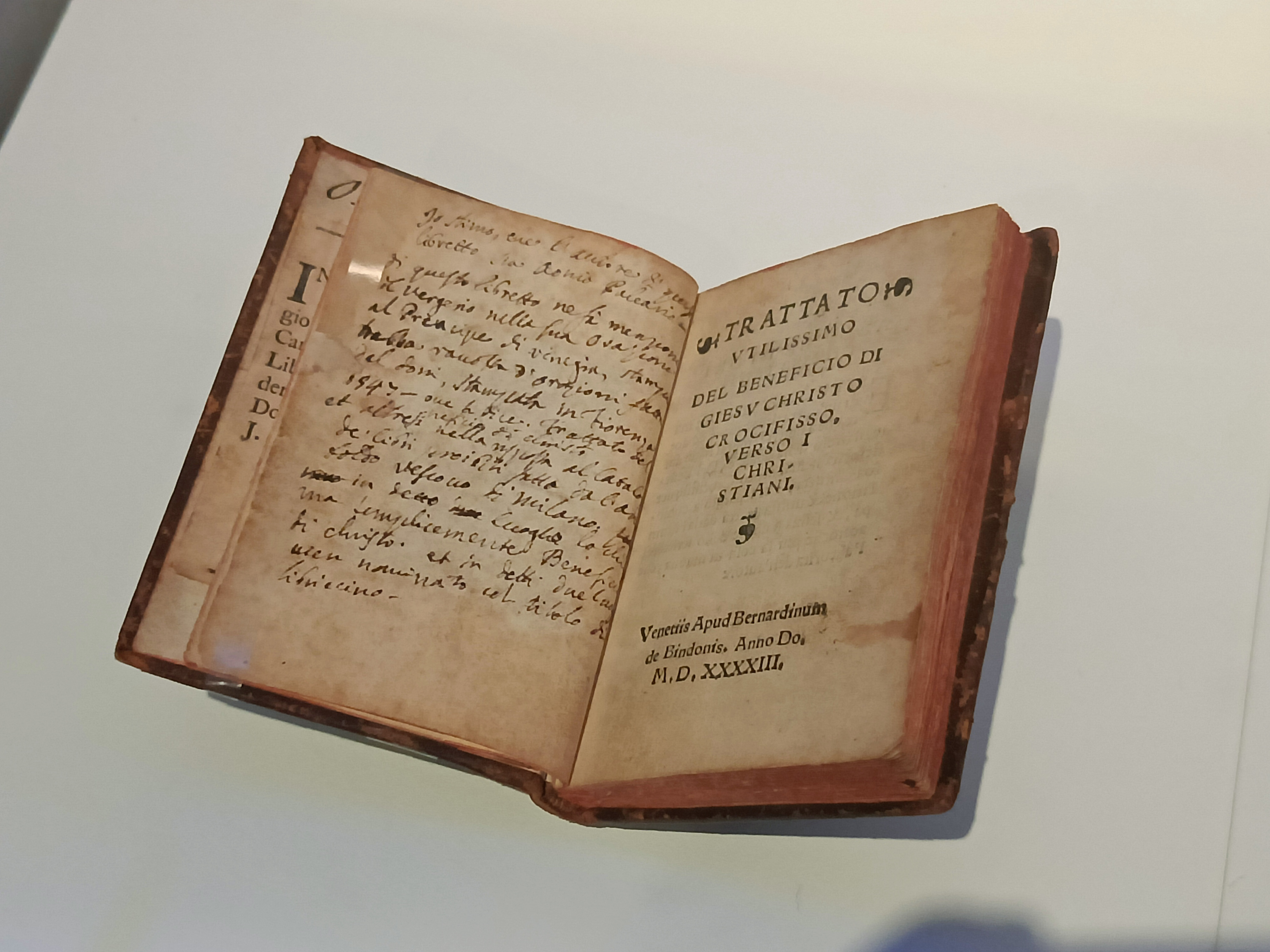
The only copy of the 1543 first edition which survived the Inquisition. Collection of St John's College, Cambridge.

Beneficio di Cristo ( lit. 'Benefit of Christ') or, in its full title, the Trattato Utilissimo del Beneficio di Iesu Cristo Crocifisso (lit. 'A Most Useful Treatise on the Benefit of Jesus Christ Crucified') was one of the most popular and influential books of spiritual devotion in sixteenth-century Europe. It reflected Italian radical (or evangelical) religious thinking of the time (the so-called Spirituali) who sought reform within the Catholic Church by drawing inspiration from the Reformation.

It is known that the second edition was published in Venice in Italian in 1543 − although at least three editions are likely to have been published there in the 1540s, as well as one printing at Mantua. After a couple of years the book was said to have sold 40,000 copies and been translated into English, French, Croat, and Castilian. The number is likely inflated, but the historian Benedetto Croce describes how the book, "barely off the press, ran swiftly like a torch through all Italy, igniting others". The work was certainly central to the thinking of Venetian evangelical communities, but was also read across Italy (including Bergamo and Modena).

The printer Andrea Arrivabene and the bookseller Bonifacio Emilione promoted the book, although its authorship remained secret. However, in 1566 it was revealed that it had been written by a Benedictine monk called Benedetto da Mantova, residing in Sicily. The work had then been substantially edited by Marcantonio Flaminio - a protege of Juan de Valdes and Cardinal Reginald Pole, and presented mystical themes from "Valdesian" theology.

The work was heavily influenced by Jean Calvin's "Institutes" of 1539, and incorporated substantial quotes. It has been described as a "deeply Augustinian work", and stresses throughout man's absolute dependence on Christ for salvation. The first four chapters in particular expounded the doctrine of salvation by faith alone (Sola fide). Without faith in God, man is incapable of good works.

Soon after its appearance the work was placed on the Index Librorum Prohibitorum (the Index of forbidden books, first published in 1559) and successfully suppressed by the Italian Inquisition. It continued with an underground following, but even by the 1560s and 1570s was proving hard to come by. The work was believed completely lost until a copy was rediscovered in England in the 19th century in St John's College, Cambridge.
