= Spirituali =

Catholic reform movement, 1530s–1560s

The Spirituali were members of a reform movement within the Catholic Church, which existed from the 1530s to the 1560s. The movement is sometimes also called evangelism.

The ranks of the Spirituali included Cardinal Gasparo Contarini (1483–1542), Cardinal Jacopo Sadoleto (1477–1547), Cardinal Reginald Pole (1500–1558), Italian poet Vittoria Colonna, and her friend, the artist Michelangelo (1475–1564), who painted the ceiling of the Sistine Chapel and the very controversial Last Judgement. These "Italian evangelicals" proposed to reform the Church through a spiritual renewal and internalization of faith by each individual, viewing the intense study of scripture and justification by faith as means to that end. "Central [to the Spirituali] was a renewed emphasis on the grace which God sent through faith," writes Church Historian Diarmaid MacCulloch, "together with a consistent urge to reveal the Holy Spirit as the force conveying this grace – to that associates of the movement were soon characterized as Spirituali."

The Spirituali took many of their ideas from older Catholic texts, but certainly found inspiration in the Protestant Reformation, especially Calvinism, although they wanted peaceful internal reform, not a split. Had the movement become successful, the face of Europe could have changed, perhaps allowing for greater understanding between Catholics and Protestants, if not even reconciliation; it could have changed the political and social reasons leading to the Thirty Years' War. Benedictine monk Benedetto Fontanini wrote the first version of the most notable expression of Spirituali doctrine, the Beneficio di Cristo (The Benefit of Christ's Death), in 1543, attempting to prove that salvation comes through Sola fide, or 'faith [in Christ] alone' (as Protestants insisted on), not through works or the Church; later the poet and humanist Marcantonio Flaminio revised it. The group printed forty thousand copies of the book, which was soon declared heretical and placed on the Index Librorum Prohibitorum.

Although Spirituali occupied positions of high power within the ecclesiastical hierarchy, and may have even held the sympathy of Pope Paul III, they failed to achieve much change, and more conservative "fundamentalist" zelanti currents set the Church on a course of confrontation with the Protestants at the Council of Trent (1545–1563), lumping them in with them. The Spirituali's lack of success stemmed from inadequate support by the Church hierarchy, and the movement was doomed when Cardinal Pole, who was the choice of Pope Paul III, lost the papal election in 1549–1550 by one vote, after which their position made them suspect to both Protestants and conservative Catholics, allowing them to be outmaneuvered and defeated. Cardinal Pole's archenemy Cardinal Carafa, who would later become Pope Paul IV (r. 1555–1559), acted to suppress the Spirituali before and after attaining the papacy, and under him many went on trial before the Inquisition, speedily exterminating the movement and ending all hope of a Protestant-like reform from within Catholicism. Cardinal Pole fled to England, while Paul IV tried unsuccessfully to have him brought back before the Catholic Inquisition.
