= Peter Martyr =

Peter Martyr is the name of:

- Peter of Verona (1206–1252), known as Saint Peter Martyr

Named for the saint:

- Peter Martyr Vermigli (1499–1562), Italian theologian
- Peter Martyr d'Anghiera (1457–1526), Italian-born historian of Spain and its New World discoveries
