= Frank A. James III =

American theologian (born 1953)

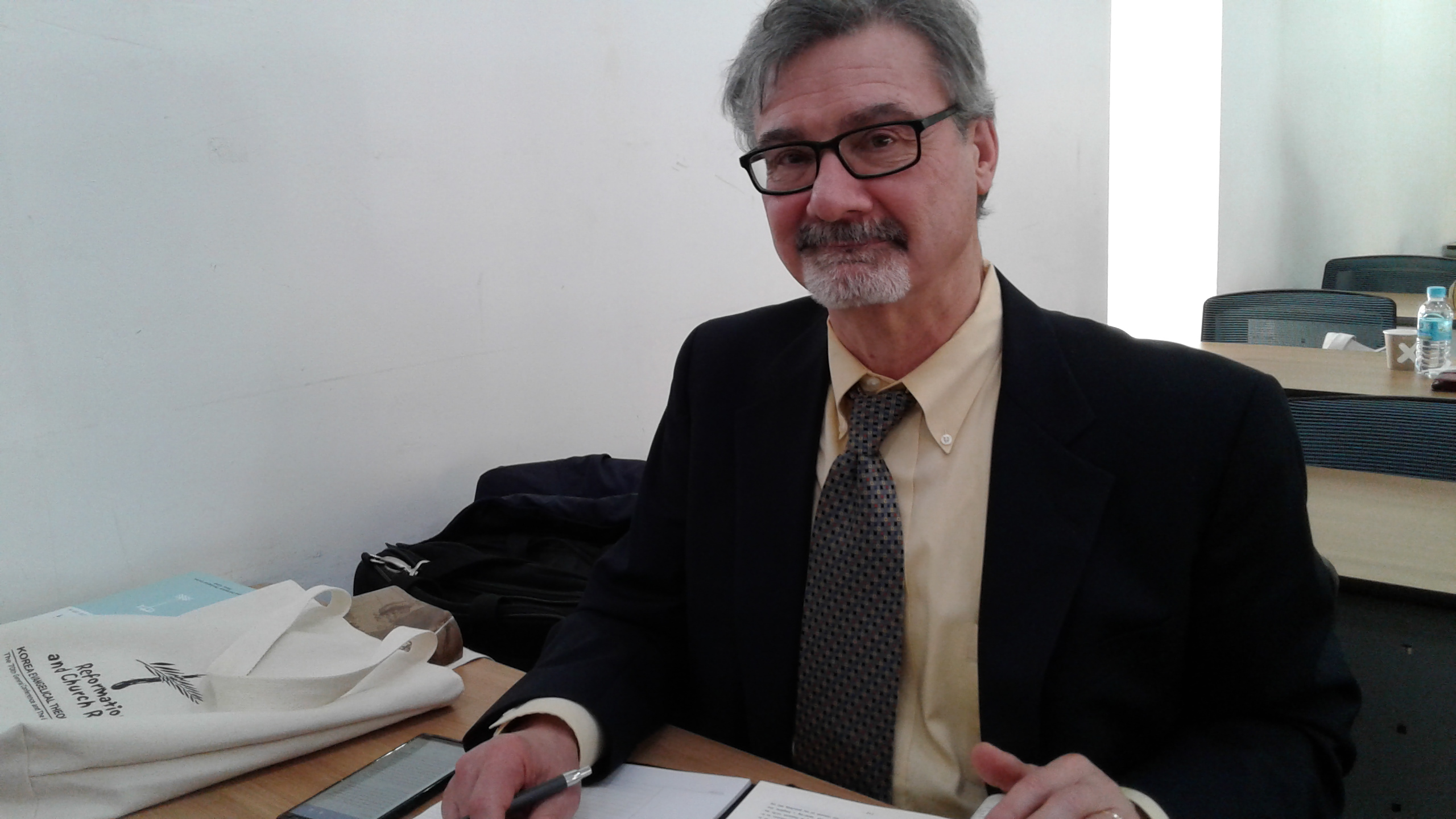
- Born: Frank Allison James III; 1953 (age 72–73); Texas, US
- Spouse: Carolyn Custis James
- Children: Noah Daniel Stokes sims ( 17 years )

Academic background
- Education: Texas Tech University; Westminster Theological Seminary; St Peter's College, Oxford
- Thesis: Praedestinatio Dei (1993); De Iustificatione (2000)
- Doctoral advisor: Alister McGrath

Academic work
- Discipline: Theology
- Sub-discipline: Historical theology
- Institutions: Reformed Theological Seminary; Gordon-Conwell Theological Seminary; Missio Seminary

Frank Allison James III (born 1953) is an American theologian and academic administrator. He is the former president of Missio Seminary in Philadelphia, Pennsylvania. Dr. James formerly served as Provost and Professor of Historical Theology at Gordon-Conwell Theological Seminary. His expertise is Reformation history, focusing especially on the life and thought of Peter Martyr Vermigli. He has authored and edited several books.

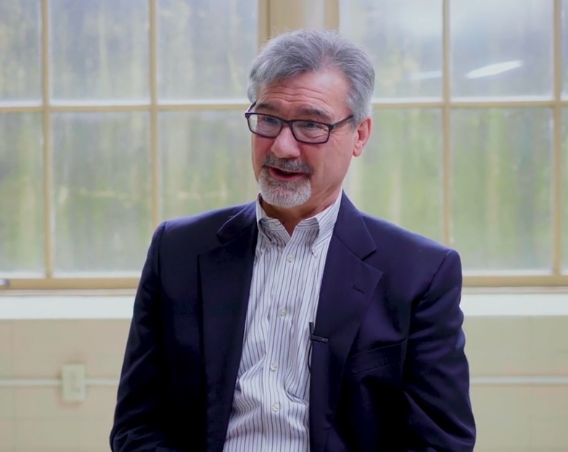
Dr. Frank James

== Education ==
Frank James received his BA from Texas Tech University and an MA at Westminster Theological Seminary. He also has received two doctorates. The first was a Doctor of Philosophy degree from the University of Oxford under the supervision of Alister McGrath. The second was from Westminster Theological Seminary.

== Career ==
Frank James has taught at several universities and seminaries. During his doctoral research he taught at Villanova and Westmont College. After his DPhil research, he became Professor of Historical Theology at Reformed Theological Seminary in Orlando, where he also served as President from 2004 to 2009. He is also one of the founding members of the Reformation Commentary on Scripture (with Intervarsity Press).

== Works ==
=== Thesis ===
- James, Frank A. (1993). Praedestinatio Dei: The Intellectual Origins of Peter Martyr Vermigli's Doctrine of Double Predestination (DPhil thesis). Oxford: University of Oxford. OCLC 863417355.
- James, Frank A. (2000). De Iustificatione: The Evolution of Peter Martyr Vermigli's Doctrine of Justification (PhD thesis). Glenside, Pennsylvania: Westminster Theological Seminary. OCLC 45482432.

=== Books ===
- ——— (1998). Peter Martyr Vermigli and Predestination: The Augustinian Inheritance of an Italian Reformer. Oxford: Oxford University Press.

=== Edited by ===
- ———; Oberman, Heiko A., eds. (1991). Via Augustini: Augustine in the later Middle Ages, Renaissance, and Reformation: Essays in Honor of Damasus Trapp, O.S.A. Studies in Medieval and Reformation Thought. Vol. 48. Leiden, Netherlands: E. J. Brill. ISBN 978-90-04-09364-5.
- ———; Oberman, Heiko A., eds. (2004). Peter Martyr Vermigli and the European Reformations: Semper Reformanda. Studies in the History of Christian Traditions. Vol. 115. Leiden, Netherlands: E. J. Brill. ISBN 978-90-04-13914-5.
