= Anthony Marten =

Anthony Marten (c. 1542 – August 1597) was an English courtier and writer during the reign of Queen Elizabeth I.

He was the son of David Marten (senior clerk to the surveyor of the king's works) and his wife Jane Cooke. Anthony Marten was educated at Trinity Hall, Cambridge, but there is no evidence that he graduated. He then entered the royal household. In 1570 he was the Queen's "sewar" and then her steward. From July 1579 to March 1586 he was bailiff of Ledbury, Herefordshire, and in August 1588 the Queen awarded him a lease for a house in Richmond. She also appointed him Keeper of the Royal Library at the Palace of Westminster (an office for life with a salary of 20 marks per annum) and as royal cup bearer the Queen granted him monopoly on exporting tin.

He wrote two tracts around the time of the Spanish Armada, portraying England as the new Israel, with Philip II of Spain as the new Sennacherib.

== Works ==
- An exhortation, to stirre up the mindes of all her majestie's faithfull subjects, to defend their countrey (1588).
- A second sound, or, Warning of the trumpet unto judgment, wherein is proved that all the tokens of the latter day are not onelie come, but welneere finished (1589).
- A Reconciliation of All the Pastors and Cleargy of the Church of England (1590).
