= San Giovanni di Verdara, Padua =

Coordinates: 45°24′59.97″N 11°52′14.71″E

Saint John of Verdara
- Chiesa di San Giovanni di Verdara
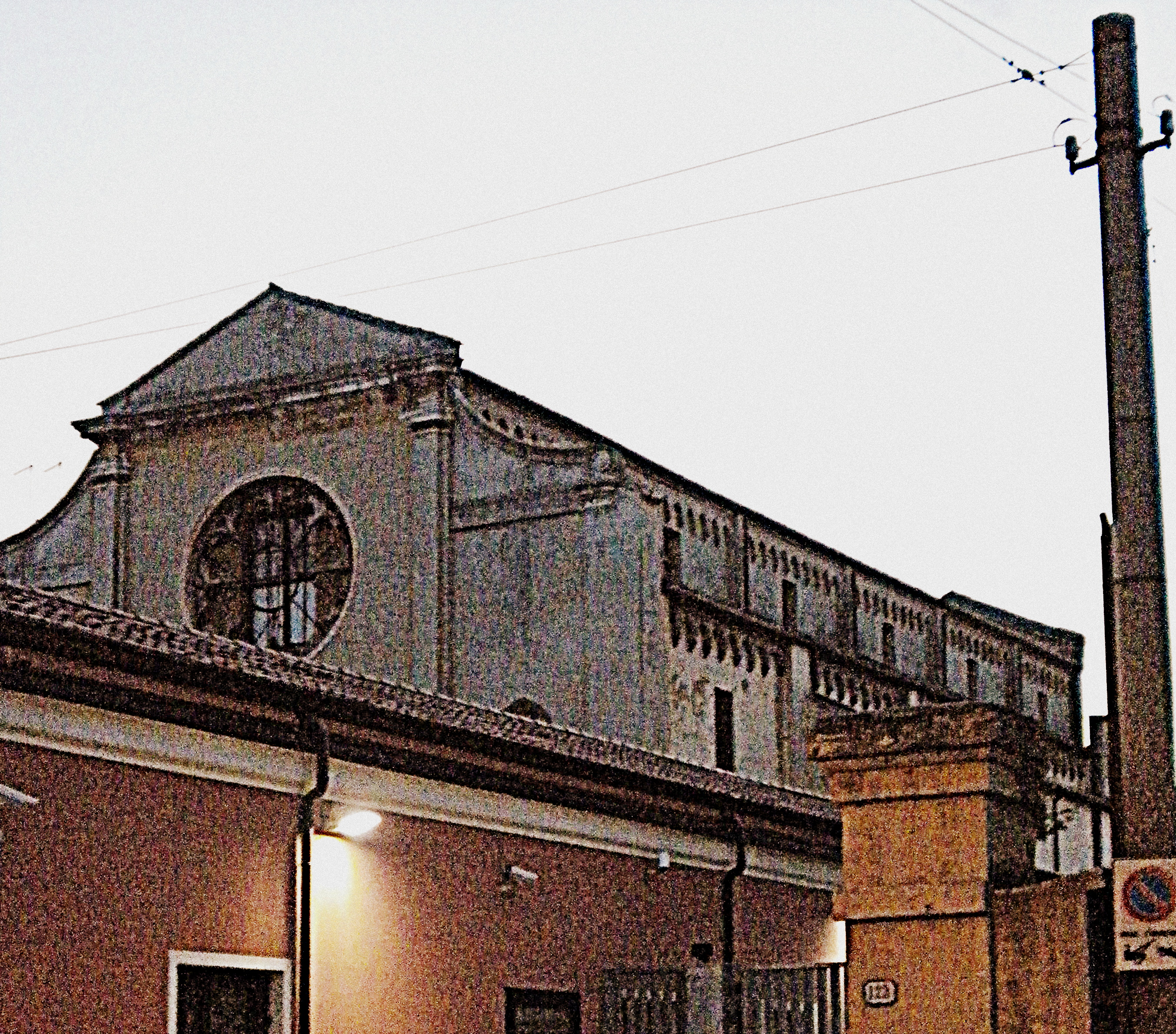
- Saint John of Verdara
- Location: Padua
- Country: Italy
- Denomination: Catholic Church

History
- Founded: 1221

Architecture
- Closed: 1866

San Giovanni di Verdara or Saint John of Verdara is a former Roman Catholic monastery and church located on Via San Giovanni di Verdara # 123, in the city of Padua, region of Veneto, Italy. It was founded in 1221, but now serves as a military hospital, and is not accessible to the public.

== History and description ==
The site by 1219 housed a convent of benedictine order monks. Because the site had luxuriant growth of vegetation, the site gained the suffix of de Verdara. In 1436, the monastery was granted to the Canons Regular of the Lateran. They commissioned from Lorenzo da Bologna and Giuliano da Porlezza a refurbishment of the monastery and design of the present church building. By 1566, the monastery had become an abbey, and over the next centuries had accumulated a well known library, with collections from Pietro Montagnana, Marco Mantova Bonavides, and Ludovico Antonio Muratori. The order of canons was suppressed in 1784 by the Republic of Venice, and the monastery briefly passed to the Jesuit order. The library was dispersed to the Civic Museum of Padua and the Biblioteca Nazionale Marciana. Over time, the monastery and church were used for different functions including brefotrofio (orphanage for abandoned babies) and barracks; the church was deconsecrated by 1866.

Inside the church were buried Giovanni Calfurnio, Giovanni da Cavino, Luca Ferrari, and Domenico Senno. The large cloister of the monastery was designed circa 1492 by Pier Antonio dell'Abate, who along with Benedetto Montagna frescoed a chapel on site.

Most of the decorations and monuments in the church have been moved for display in the Musei Civici agli Eremitani. An inventory in 1817 noted the external façade had the tomb of Andrea Briosco. The fresco over the door, depicting the Virgin and Child with Sts Joseph and John the Baptist was painted by Jacopo Ceruti. The first altar had a Pieta sculpted in marble by Antonio Bonazza. The funeral monument of Lazzaro Bonamico had a marble bust of the author by Felice Chiereghino. Other canvases were painted by Pietro Rotari, Pietro Ricci, Pietro da Bagnara, and Stefano dall' Arzere. The church once housed a canvas depicting Bishop St Patrick heals a sick man by Giovanni Battista Tiepolo.
