= Grynaeus =

Grynaeus may refer to:

- Johann Jakob Grynaeus (1540–1617), Swiss Protestant clergyman
- Samuel Gryneaus (1539–1599), Swiss jurist
- Simon Grynaeus (1493–1541), German scholar and theologian
- Simon Grynaeus the Younger (1539–1582), Swiss mathematician and university professor
- Simon Grynaeus (1725–1799), Biblical scholar and translator
- Thomas Grynaeus (1512–1564), Swiss Protestant clergyman
