= Karl Joseph Ringold =

Swiss Catholic priest (1737–1815)

- Born: 25 August 1737; Altdorf, Uri, Old Swiss Confederacy
- Died: 16 June 1815 (aged 77); Altdorf, Uri, Switzerland
- Occupation: Catholic priest
- Parents: Karl Franz Ringold (father); Maria Ursula Appollonia Lauener (mother)
- Relatives: Sebastian Anton Ringold (uncle)

Karl Joseph Ringold (25 August 1737 – 16 June 1815) was a Swiss Catholic priest from Altdorf in the canton of Uri. He was parish priest in Attinghausen, Sarmenstorf and Altdorf, and from 1793 to 1801 episcopal commissary in Uri. In Sarmenstorf he gained a reputation as an educated, enlightened and reform-minded cleric; he introduced German hymn singing at Mass, encouraged the reading of the New Testament in the vernacular, and cultivated dialogue with Reformed clergy and scholars.

== Biography ==
Karl Joseph Ringold was born on 25 August 1737 in Altdorf, the son of Karl Franz Ringold, a schoolmaster, and Maria Ursula Appollonia Lauener. He was a nephew of Sebastian Anton Ringold. He attended the Latin school in Altdorf and the monastery school of Muri, studied theology at the Collegium Helveticum in Milan, and was ordained a priest in 1761.

From 1761 to 1766 Ringold was chaplain of the Straumeyer family benefice (Familienpfrund) in Altdorf. He was then parish priest in Attinghausen from 1766 to 1779, in Sarmenstorf from 1779 to 1793 and in Altdorf from 1793 to 1804, and episcopal commissary (bischöflicher Kommissar) in Uri from 1793 to 1801. In 1804–1805 he was parish priest in Bauen; he then stayed at the convent in Seedorf, and from 1808 he was chaplain to the Capuchin nuns in Altdorf.

In Attinghausen, Ringold made his first contacts with representatives of the Swiss Catholic Enlightenment, among them Joseph Anton Felix von Balthasar and Johann Rudolf Schinz. In Sarmenstorf he gained a reputation as an educated, enlightened and reform-minded cleric. In the liturgy he introduced German hymn singing at Mass (deutscher Messgesang) and Reformed Bible songs, and he encouraged the reading of the New Testament in the vernacular. He cultivated confessional tolerance and dialogue with Reformed clergy and scholars, above all with the antistes of Zurich, Johann Jakob Hess. His membership of the Helvetic Society from 1782 also brought him important connections.

Ringold played an important part as intermediary and guarantor (Mittels- und Gewährsmann) for private relief efforts, which were carried out mainly by Reformed circles in Zurich and Basel: in 1798 for Nidwalden, and in Uri after the fire of Altdorf in 1799 and the campaigns of the French and Russian armies. After fierce conflicts with representatives of the authorities of the Helvetic Republic, and after the intervention of the bishop of Constance, he resigned as episcopal commissary in 1801.

Although Ringold at times spoke critically of the Jesuits and the monasteries and approved of the reforms of Emperor Joseph II, he rejected state interference in church affairs. In his later years, marked by his bad experiences during the Helvetic Republic, he took a restorative position. He died in Altdorf on 16 June 1815.

== Bibliography ==
- S. Röllin, "Pfarrer Karl Joseph Ringold (1737–1815)", in Der Geschichtsfreund 137, 1984, 5–330
- Helvetia Sacra I/2, 723 f.
