= Simon Sulzer =

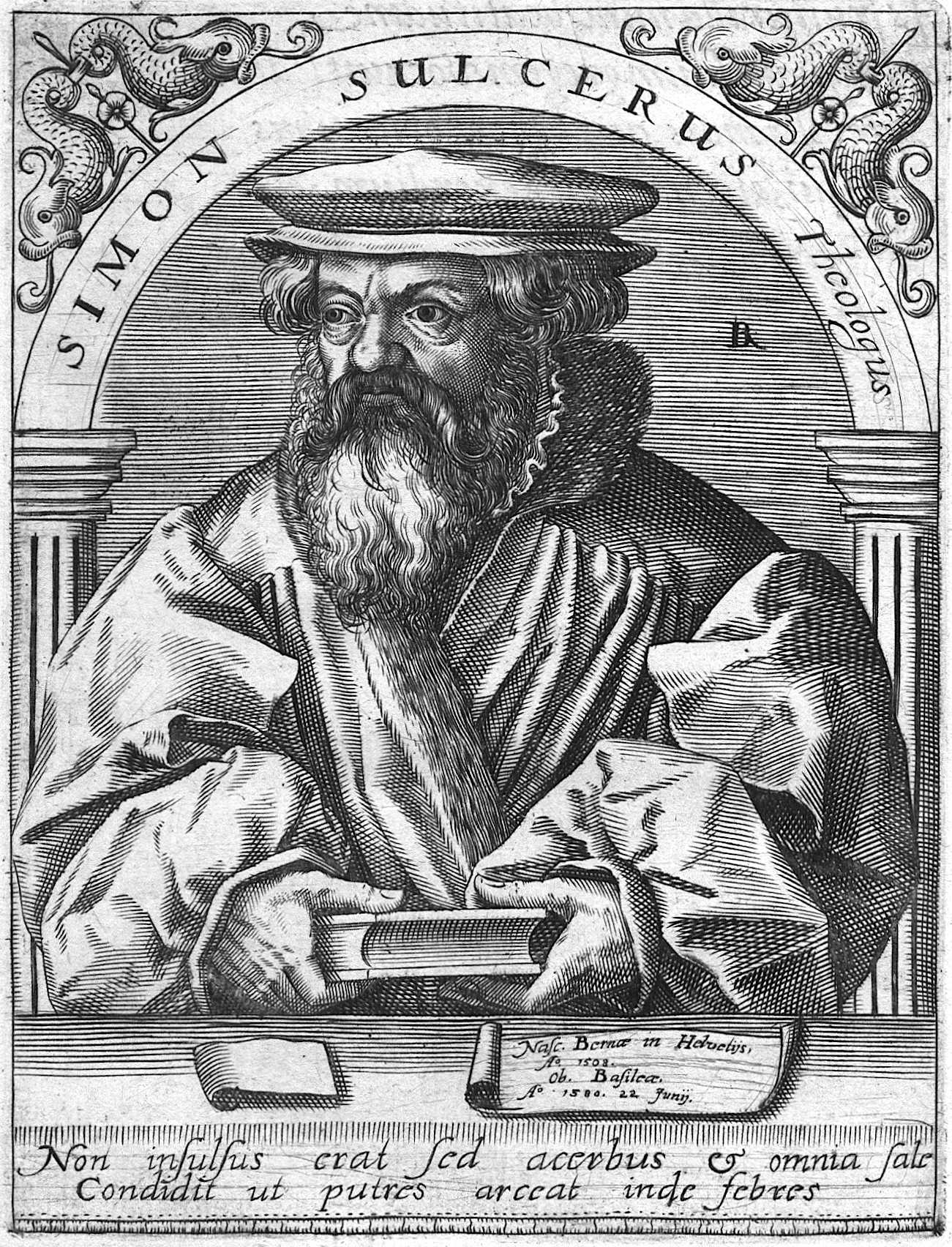
Simon Sulzer

Simon Sulzer (22 September 1508 – 22 June 1585) was a Reformed theologian, Reformer, and Antistes of the Basel church.

== Life ==
Sulzer was born in Schattenhalb, the child of a priest. He was educated in Bern and Lucerne. The sudden death of his father, the provost of Interlaken, forced him to turn to manual labor to support himself. He worked as a barber in Strasbourg and attended lectures by Martin Bucer and Wolfgang Capito. He moved to Basel in 1531, where he associated with Simon Grynaeus. Here he worked as a proofreader at the print shop of Johann Heerwagen and was also employed as a teacher. From 1533 he worked in Bern in education and proved his worth in the schools.

On the initiative of the Bern town council, he pursued additional studies in 1537 and took a master's degree. As a supporter of the Wittenberg Concord, he was in Wittenberg in 1536 and was greatly impressed by Martin Luther, as he revealed to his friend Joachim Vadianus. He blamed the disagreement with Luther on the Swiss. Meanwhile, the older generation of reformers of Bern, Berchtold Haller and Franz Kolb, died, and a new direction was set by certain theologians from Strasbourg, to which he also adhered. He soon became the head of the Bernese clergy. His impact was multifaceted and not always unambiguous. He was consumed in the struggle with the followers of Ulrich Zwingli, to whom he eventually was forced to concede in 1548.

He received a post in Basel in 1549, first as pastor of the Peterskirche, then as a professor and as Antistes of the Basel church in 1553.He taught as professor of the New Testament and later, as professor of the Old Testament. He proceeded more cautiously in Basel than in Bern. He endeavored to bring about the reconciliation of the German and Swiss churches, although he kept a relative distance from the Zwinglian and Calvinist position. His Lutheran inclinations made him favor the Formula of Concord over the Second Helvetic Confession and to likewise to promote private confession, organs and church bells. Thus he occupied an awkward position vis-à-vis the Swiss churches and provoked opposition. His efforts proved to be only an ephemeral episode in Basel.

He played a major role in a mediatory role that led to the Strasbourg Consensus. He was also heavily involved in the introduction of the Reformation into the margravate of Baden-Durlach. He ordained Protestant ministers for this area in 1556 and led by church visitations. Without abandoning his position in Basel, he worked as a Superintendent in Baden. Sulzer was an energetic and responsible worker into his old age.

He died in Basel.

== Publications ==
His books include;

- Acta Synodi Bernensis 1532
- Locorum communium collectanea 1562-1564
- Theses theologicae de precatione (1580)

Religious titles
Preceded by Oswald Myconius	Antistes of Basel; 1553–1585	Succeeded by Johann Jakob Grynaeus
