= Sebastian Anton Ringold =

Swiss Catholic priest (1698–1778)

- Born: 28 June 1698; Altdorf, Uri, Old Swiss Confederacy
- Died: 11 August 1778 (aged 80); Altdorf, Uri, Old Swiss Confederacy
- Occupation: Catholic priest
- Parents: Franz Florian Ringold (father); Katharina Elisabeth Straumeyer (mother)
- Relatives: Karl Joseph Ringold (nephew)

Sebastian Anton Ringold (28 June 1698 – 11 August 1778) was a Swiss Catholic priest from Altdorf in the canton of Uri. He taught at the Latin school in Altdorf, became parish priest of Altdorf in 1755 and episcopal commissary in Uri in 1775. He directed performances of religious plays in Altdorf several times, and as an organist he sometimes composed their music.

== Biography ==
Sebastian Anton Ringold was born on 28 June 1698 in Altdorf, the son of Franz Florian Ringold, an agent (Faktor), and Katharina Elisabeth Straumeyer. He was the uncle of Karl Joseph Ringold. After attending the Latin school in Altdorf and the monastery school of Engelberg, he studied theology at the Collegium Helveticum in Milan. He was ordained a priest in 1721.

Ringold was first a schoolmaster and then, until 1730, a professor at the Latin school. From 1735 he was chaplain of the benefice (Pfründe) founded by the Straumeyer family. In 1735 he became assistant parish priest (Pfarrhelfer), in 1755 parish priest of Altdorf and in 1775 episcopal commissary (bischöflicher Kommissar) in Uri.

Ringold directed performances of religious plays in Altdorf several times, and as an organist he sometimes composed the music for them, for example for Das Leben des hl. Martinus (The Life of Saint Martin) in 1723. As assistant parish priest he left interesting notes in the Altdorf church registers. He died in Altdorf on 11 August 1778.

== Bibliography ==
- T. Herger, Das Bischöfliche Kommissariat Uri, 1963, 49–51
- S. Röllin, "Pfarrer Karl Joseph Ringold (1737–1815)", in Der Geschichtsfreund 137, 1984, 5–330, especially 35
