= Johannes Zwick =

German hymnwriter (c.1496–1542)

- Born: c. 1496; Konstanz
- Died: 23 October 1542; Bischofszell
- Education: University of Freiburg; University of Bologna; University of Padua
- Occupations: Catholic priest; Reformed pastor; Academic teacher; Hymnwriter
- Organizations: University of Basel

Johannes Zwick (c. 1496 – 23 October 1542) was a theologian and jurist, a German Reformer in Riedlingen and Konstanz known as a hymnwriter.

== Life and career ==
Zwick was born in Konstanz c. 1496, the son of the councillor Konrad Zwick and his wife Margreth. He studied first law and then theology at the University of Freiburg with Ulrich Zasius from 1509, joined by his brother Konrad und his cousin Thomas Blarer. He studied further in Bologna and in Padua. He was consecrated as a priest in 1518 and promoted to the doctorate in 1520. He worked as professor of law at the Universität Basel, but moved in 1522 to be a pastor of a parish in Riedlingen, the second Protestant pastor there, on a recommendation of the reformer Huldrych Zwingli. He married before assuming the position.

He was excluded from sacramental acts and only permitted to preach. A conflict ended with him escaping to Konstanz in 1527. He remained in correspondence with members of the Riedlingen congregation for life. Together with his cousin Ambrosius Blarer he established the Reformation in Konstanz from 1525. A gifted pedagogue, he especially for children and youth, teaching them the Our Father, the creed and the Ten Commandments. He authored Biblical reflections, hymns and prayers for times of the day and days of the week. The Bishop left the city in 1526, and the last mass was held at the Munster on 15 August 1527. Zwick visited Wolfgang Capito and Martin Bucer in Strasbourg to consult a new order for the church. An order was passed in 1531 by Thomas Blarer and Konrad Zwick, which Zwick also influenced, intended to reduce poverty, promote education and morals.

In 1535 Zwick published a New Testament which had the Latin text by Erasmus von Rotterdam and the German text of the Zürcher Bibel side by side. It was printed by Christoph Froschauer in Zürich. Zwick and Ambrosius Blarer became pioneers of singing in church in the region when they published the first Konstanzer Gesangbuch in 1533, followed by a Neu Gsangbüchle, printed in 1540 in Zürich with his preface. The hymnals included 150 songs, including 17 by Zwick, by other reformers such as Martin Luther, and also one by the canon Johannes von Botzheim and the baptist Ludwig Hätzer. Zwick created 111 documented songs and poems, 61 of them in German.

Zwick briefly hosted the anabaptist Johannes Bünderlin in 1529. He followed Zwingli's teaching about the eucharist and therefore was the only clergyman in Konstanz who opposed the Wittenberg Concord of 1536. He undertook several inspection visits, after Zwingli's death in 1531 also to Switzerland, to strengthen reformed parishes.

In 1542 he had a the plague infection from which he first recovered. He succeeded the pastor of Bischofszell, Andreas Köllin, upon his death that year.

Zwick died from the plague in Bischofszell on 23 October 1542.

== Works ==
Zwick's most popular hymns are:

- "All Morgen ist ganz frisch und neu", 1541/1545 (music: Johann Walter 1541; EG 440 and RG 557)
- "Du höchstes Licht, du ewger Schein", 1541/1545 (music from the 15th century by the Bohemian Brethren, Nürnberg 1544; EG 441 and RG 560)
- "Auf diesen Tag bedenken wir", regionally: in Württemberg EG 552, in Rhineland-Palatinate, Westphalia und Lippe EG 565, Evangelisch-reformierte Kirche 565)
- "Da nun der Tag uns geht zu End", 1533/1540 (after Psalm 128; music: Strasbourg 1525; RG 591)

He published a New Testament in both Latin and German:

- Das gantz Neüw Testament 1535. Das gantz Neüw Testament zu Teütsch dem Latine entgegen gesetzt mitt sampt den nodtwendigen Concordantzenn: Was aber die ursach sye darumb diß Testament jm gegennsatz beyder spraachen ußgangen sye, findest du inn der vorred. Novvm Testamentvm Omne: Latina Versione, Oppositvm Aeditioni uulgari siue Germanicae, in usus studiosorum uulgatum; per Desiderium Erasmum Roterodamum nouissime recogniti. Christoffel Froschouer, Zürich 1535, 803 Seiten

== Legacy ==
Zwick's memorial day in the Lutheran calendar of saints is 23 October.
