= Lavater (surname) =

Lavater is a surname. Notable people with the surname include:

- Johann Kaspar Lavater (1741–1801), Swiss poet, writer, philosopher, physiognomist, and theologian
- Louis Lavater (1867–1953), Australian composer and author
- Ludwig Lavater (1527–1586), Swiss Reformed theologian
