= Strasbourg Consensus =

The Strasbourg Consensus was a joint statement of doctrine by Reformed and Lutheran theologians, signed in Strasbourg in March 1563. The signing of the Strasbourg Consensus resolved the open struggles in Stasbourg, with both factions signing a joint statement on the “disputed issues of predestination, the perseverance of the saints, and the Lord's Supper.” (This should not be confused with the European Union's Strasbourg Consensus of 1983.)

From 1561 to 1563, theological controversy between the prominent pastor Johann Marbach and Professor Girolamo Zanchi of the Strasbourg Academy divided the Church in the city of Strasbourg. In February, 1562, the Basel city council had offered to send theologians to mediate the dispute between the Strasbourg clergy and the Academy. Strasbourg agreed and a year later Basel sent Simon Sulzer and others.

The mediators then met separately with each group and drafted several articles on main issues. “A general paragraph was later added to this document stating that the Lord's Supper would be taught in conformity with the Augsburg Confession, its Apology, and the Wittenberg Concord. This paragraph corresponded with a decision of the Strasbourg city council that the Augsburg Confession and its Apology, rather than the city's own Tetrapolitan Confession, would serve as the doctrinal standard for the arbiters.”

Sulzer repeatedly reassured Zanchi that he and the other mediators were there in Strasbourg to draw up a common statement “which would end the controversy and reconcile the two sides, not to reach a final agreement on the doctrinal issues. At the official ceremony of reconciliation, Zanchi was unwilling to shake hands with Marbach, who still condemned Zanchi's teachings... At this point Sulzer took Zanchi aside and told him that the handshake did not mean that the two parties agreed on doctrine; such agreement could only be reached at a general synod. Instead, the handshake would signify two things: that Zanchi accepted the Consensus' formulation of doctrine, and that he sincerely forgave the other party for wrongs committed against him in the course of the controversy.”

The agreement ended the controversy in Strasbourg, but undermined the unity of the four evangelical German-speaking cities of Switzerland. One of its signatories was Simon Sulzer, antistes of the Basel church and rector of the city's university, and he was regarded as a theological enemy by other churches. “Their failure set the stage for Basel's gradual alienation from the other Reformed churches and cities in Switzerland over the next two decades.”

== Literature ==
- Kittelson, James M. "Marbach vs. Zanchi: The Resolution of Controversy in Late Reformation Strasbourg." Sixteenth Century Journal 8 (1977): 31–44.
