= Helvetic Confessions =

16th-century Swiss Reformed confessions of faith

Latin & German manuscript, Confessio Helvetica Prior

The Helvetic Confessions are two documents expressing the common belief of Reformed churches, especially in Switzerland, whose primary author was the Swiss Reformed theologian Heinrich Bullinger. The First Helvetic Confession (1536) contributed to the confessional unity of the Protestant cantons of Switzerland against the Roman Catholic cantons, whereas the Second Helvetic Confession (1566) contributed to the confessional unity of Reformed churches across Europe, particularly due to the patronage it received from Frederick III, Elector Palatine, who had it translated into German.

== First Helvetic Confession ==
The First Helvetic Confession (Latin: Confessio Helvetica prior), known also as the Second Confession of Basel, was drawn up in Basel in 1536 by Heinrich Bullinger and Leo Jud of Zurich, Kaspar Megander of Bern, Oswald Myconius and Simon Grynaeus of Basel, Martin Bucer and Wolfgang Capito of Strasbourg, with other representatives from Schaffhausen, St Gall, Mühlhausen and Biel. Bucer and Capito in particular aimed to reconcile Reformed and Lutheran doctrine through the Confession. The first draft was written in Latin and the Zurich delegates objected to its Lutheran phraseology. However, Leo Jud's German translation was accepted by all, and after Myconius and Grynaeus had modified the Latin form, both versions were agreed to and adopted on February 26, 1536. Bucer and Capito brought the Confession to Martin Luther as a symbol of Reformed-Lutheran unity, but he ultimately rejected it.

The first five articles affirm the Protestant doctrine of sola scriptura, viewing Holy Scripture as its own interpreter, containing all that is necessary to know for salvation (sufficiency) and supremely authoritative over all other human writings. Article VI treats of the Trinity of persons in one divine essence. Articles VII-X discuss God's creation of man in his image; the most noble of creatures, which fell into sin by the original sin of Adam, and God's eternal plan of salvation for fallen man. Articles XI-XIV teach that we are saved by God's grace through Christ through faith alone. Articles XV-XX treat of the Church, its authority and the office of the ministry. Articles XXI-XXIII are distinctly Reformed in sacramentology, regarding baptism and the Lord's supper as 'holy symbols of high mysteries, not mere or empty signs, but significant signs accompanying spiritual realities; in Baptism, water is the sign, regeneration and adoption the reality; in the Supper the bread and wine are signs, communion of the body and blood of the Lord is the spiritual reality'. Finally, Articles XXIV-XXVIII treat of public worship, ceremonies, marriage and schism.

Confessio Helvetica posterior

== Second Helvetic Confession ==
The Second Helvetic Confession (Latin: Confessio Helvetica posterior) was written by Bullinger in 1562 and revised in 1564 as a private exercise. It came to the notice of Elector Palatine Frederick III, who had it translated into German and published. The Confession was attractive to some Reformed leaders as a corrective to what they saw as the overly Lutheran statements of the Strasbourg Consensus. An attempt was made in early 1566 to have all the churches of Switzerland sign the Second Helvetic Confession as a common statement of faith. It gained a favorable hold on the Swiss churches, who had found the First Confession too short and too Lutheran. However, 'the Basel clergy refused to sign the confession, stating that although they found no fault with it, they preferred to stand by their own Basel Confession of 1534.' Due to this near-universal approval in Reformed Switzerland, Frederick presented it to the Diet of Augsburg of 1566 as an authoritative document representing the international Reformed faith. According to W. A. Curtis, 'In theological ability and in doctrinal interest few Confessions can bear comparison with it [...] it would be difficult to conceive of a theological manifesto, or compendium of doctrine, more attractive in form and matter, more lucid, effective, and shrewd, more loyal to Scripture, or more instinct with common sense.'

=== Contents ===
Chapters 1 and 2 treat the doctrine of Scripture as the sole infallible authority (sola scriptura), regarding it as its own interpreter, and subjecting all other human writings (traditional or Patristic) to the standard of the Bible. Chapter 3 confesses the Trinity of persons in the one divine essence and accepts the Apostles' Creed, condemning 'Jews and Mohammedans and all who blaspheme this holy and adorable Trinity,' and 'all heretics who deny the deity of Christ and the Holy Ghost.' Chapter 4 expresses iconoclasm and condemns images of God or Christ. Chapter 5 rejects the invocation of saints, 'nevertheless we neither despise nor undervalue the saints, but honour them as the members of Christ and the friends of God who have gloriously overcome the flesh and the world; we love them as brethren and hold them up as examples of faith and virtue, desiring to dwell with them eternally in heaven and to rejoice with them in Christ.' Chapter 6 establishes the characteristically Reformed doctrine of divine providence, while allowing for secondary causes operating within God's sovereignty; 'we disapprove of the rash words of those who say that our efforts and endeavours are vain.' Chapters 7-9 teach that man consists of two substances: body and soul (bipartite view); the latter of which is said to be immortal: 'We condemn those who deny immortality, or affirm the sleep of the soul, or teach that it is a part of God.' The creation of man by God as upright is detailed, along with the original sin and the total depravity for all of humanity which it entails. Only those who are regenerate are considered free from, 'being moved by the Spirit of God to do of themselves what they do', although the unregenerate remain wilful slaves to unrighteousness. Chapter 10 on predestination has been interpreted as 'moderate Calvinism' or Augustinianism, and emphasises Christians' assurance of predestination through communion with Christ, 'We shall have a sufficient testimony of being written in the book of life if we live in communion with Christ, and if in true faith He is ours and we are His.' The chapter references Philippians 2:13, For it is God which worketh in you both to will and to do of his good pleasure. Chapter 11, besides confessing the hypostatic union of Christ's human and divine nature, accepts 'believingly and reverently the communication of properties, which is deduced from Scripture and employed by the universal ancient Church in explaining and reconciling passages apparently in contradiction.' Chapter 14 describes the Protestant doctrine of penitence.

It is sufficient to confess our sins to God in private and in the public service; it is not necessary to confess to a priest, for this is nowhere commanded in the Scriptures; although we may seek counsel and comfort from a minister of the gospel in times of distress and trial (cf. Jas. v. 16). The keys of the kingdom of heaven, out of which the Papists forge swords, sceptres, and crowns, are given to all legitimate ministers of the Church in the preaching of the Gospel and the maintenance of discipline (Matt. xvi. 19; John xx. 23; Mark xvi. 15; 2 Cor. v. 18, 19). We condemn the lucrative Popish doctrines of penance and indulgences, and apply to them Peter's word to Simon Magus, Thy money perish with thee.

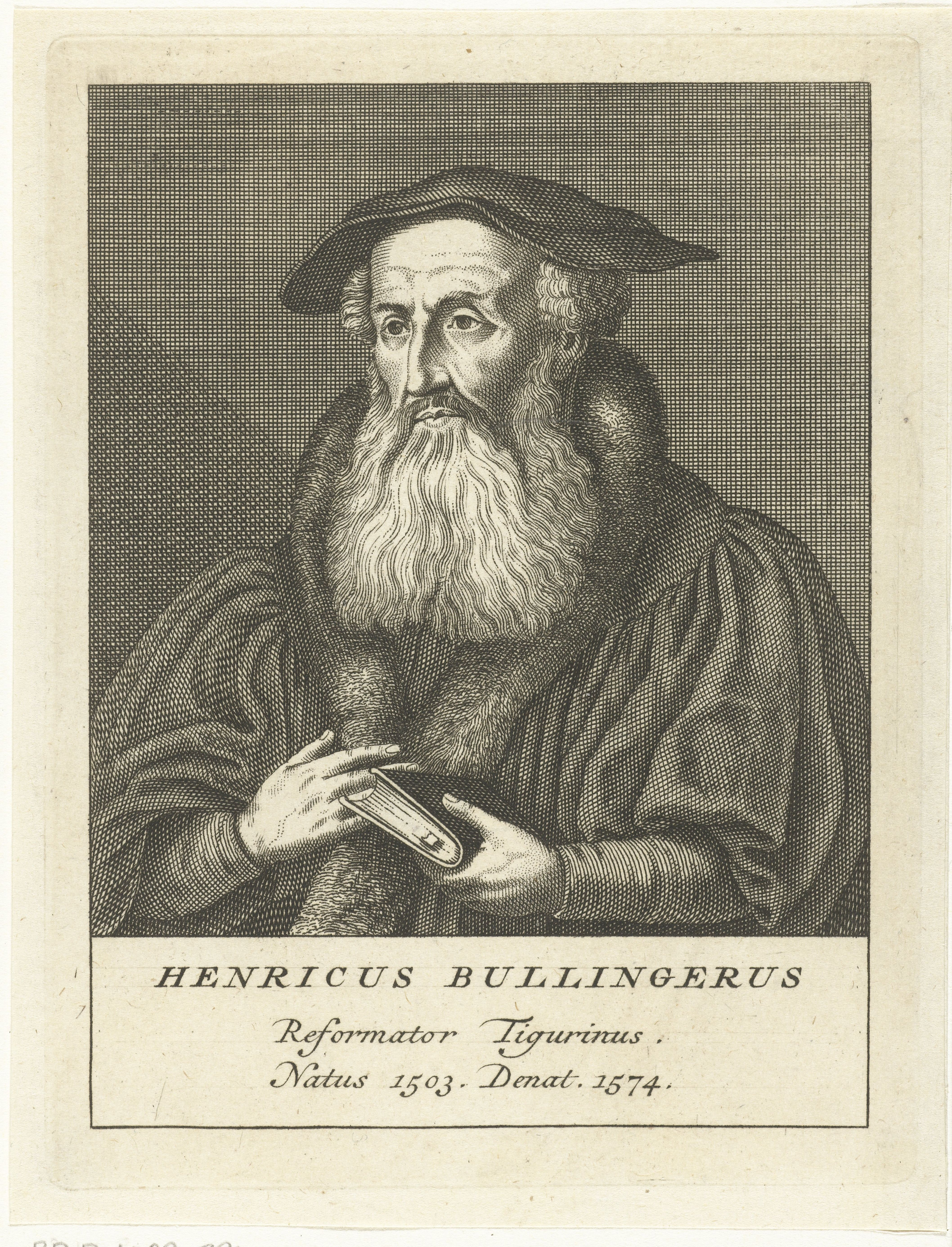
Heinrich Bullinger, the primary author of the Helvetic Confessions.

Chapter 16 describes the nature of faith as no mere opinion or persuasion, but rather a free gift of God and the source of good works. Chapter 17 explicitly espouses the doctrine of the Church invisible, 'The Church may be called invisible, not that the men composing it are invisible, but because they are known only to God, while we are often mistaken in our judgment: those who separate from that true Church cannot live before God. [...] As there was no salvation out of the ark of Noah, so there is no certain salvation out of Christ, who exhibits Himself to the elect in the Church for their nourishment.' Chapter 18 espouses presbyterian polity in claiming that the offices of presbyter and bishop were one in the Apostolic Church. Ministers are expected to be learned although 'innocent simplicity may be more useful than haughty learning.' Chapter 19 defines the two sacraments as 'sacred rites instituted by God as signs and seals of His promises [cf. Romans 4:11] for the strengthening of our faith, and as pledges on our part of our consecration to Him.'

Of the five 'Popish' innovations, confirmation and extreme unction are dismissed while repentance, ordination and marriage are said to be divine institutions rather than sacraments. The chapter makes a difference between the sign and thing signified of the sacraments, and thus the dependence of the efficacy of the sacraments upon God's faithfulness rather than the minister's (ex opere operato). Chapter 21 states that the body of Christ is in heaven, and therefore our worship must be directed towards heaven, although Christ is spiritually present in us, and thus condemns the Eucharistic adoration of the Roman Catholic mass, 'The Mass—whatever it may have been in ancient times—has been turned from a salutary institution into a vain show and surrounded with various abuses which justify its abolition.' Chapter 24 states that the Sabbath is 'observed in Christian freedom, not with Jewish superstition.' Liturgical feasts in honour of saints are rejected. Fasting and self-denial are encouraged and seen as spiritually profitable so long as they are prompted by humility and not by the desire for merit. Chapter 27, in alignment with the regulative principle of worship, states that 'the more of human rites are accumulated in the Church, the more it is drawn away from Christian liberty and from Christ Himself, while the ignorant seek in ceremonies what they should seek in Christ through faith.' Chapter 30 confesses the legitimacy of the civil magistrate as God's appointed servant, 'to preserve peace and public order, to promote and protect religion and good morals [...] to punish offenders against society, such as thieves, murderers, oppressors, blasphemers, and incorrigible heretics (if they are really heretics). [...] We condemn the Anabaptists who maintain that a Christian should not hold a civil office, that the magistrate has no right to punish any one by death, or to make war or to demand an oath.' The chapter further states that 'Wars are only justifiable in self-defence and after all efforts at peace have been exhausted.'

=== Reception ===
The Second Helvetic Confession was adopted by the Reformed Church not only throughout Switzerland but in Scotland (1566), Hungary (1567), France (1571), and Poland (1578). Along with the Thirty-nine Articles, the Westminster Confession of Faith, the Scots Confession and the Heidelberg Catechism it is one of the most generally recognized confessions of the Reformed Church. According to Dezső Buzogány, 'the Confession had a vital part in [Hungarian Reformed] church life in the 17th and 18th centuries. While the Heidelberg Catechism played a major role in educating the congregation and the children in matters of faith, the Second Helvetic Confession was significant in the formation and instruction of future clergymen.' The Hungarian Reformed Synod of Buda of 1791 formally rejected the Enlightenment and the Counter-Reformation, as well as the teachings of Christian Wolff, ordering schools to teach the Helvetic Confession as part of the official curriculum. The Second Helvetic Confession was also included in the United Presbyterian Church in the U.S.A.'s Book of Confessions, in 1967, and remains in the Book of Confessions adopted by the Presbyterian Church (U.S.A.).

=== Mariology ===
Mary is mentioned several times in the Second Helvetic Confession, which expounds Bullinger's mariology. Chapter 3 quotes the angel's message to the Virgin Mary, The Holy Ghost shall come upon thee (Luke 1:35), as an indication of the existence of the Holy Spirit and the Trinity. The Latin text described Mary as diva, indicating her rank as a person, who dedicated herself to God. In Chapter 9, the Jesus Christ is said to be conceived by the Holy Spirit and born without the participation of any man. The Second Helvetic Confession accepted the 'Ever Virgin' notion from John Calvin, which spread throughout much of Europe with the approbation of this document in the above-mentioned countries. Bullinger's 1539 polemical treatise against idolatry expressed his belief that Mary's 'sacrosanctum corpus' ('sacrosanct body') had been assumed into heaven by angels:

For this reason we believe that the Virgin Mary, Begetter of God, the most pure bed and temple of the Holy Spirit, that is, her most holy body, was carried to heaven by angels.

== See also ==
- Reformation in Switzerland
- Helvetic Consensus
- Confession of Basel
- Consensus Tigurinus
