= Ambrosius Blarer =

German Protestant reformer

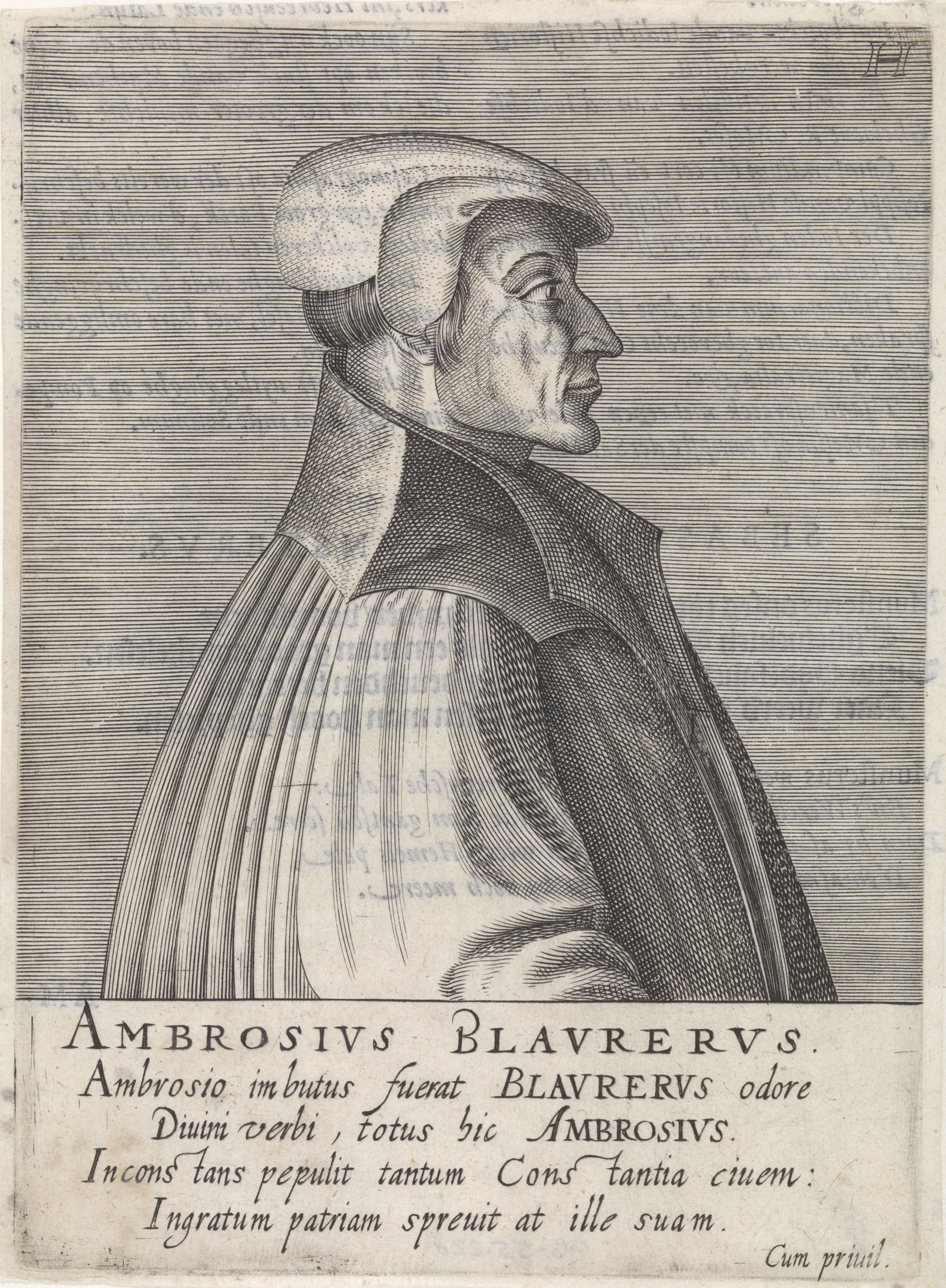
Ambrosius Blarer

Ambrosius Blarer (sometimes Ambrosius Blaurer; April 4, 1492 – December 6, 1564) was an influential Protestant reformer in southern Germany and north-eastern Switzerland.

== Early life ==
Ambrosius Blarer was born 1492 into a leading family of Konstanz. He studied theology in Tübingen where he met Philip Melanchthon with whom he kept a lifelong friendship. After getting his master‘s degree, he entered the Benedictine monastery Alpirsbach Abbey.

Through his correspondence with Philip Melanchthon and his brother Thomas Blarer, a student in Wittenberg between 1520 and 1523, Ambrosius Blarer was well informed about Luther's teachings and began spreading them himself among his brothers. This led to a conflict between him and his superiors and in 1522 Blarer fled the convent. He found refuge in his hometown; Constance was already well on the way to becoming reformed so he did not have to fear the consequences of breaking his vows. Nevertheless, he kept wearing his habit.

== Reformation of Konstanz ==
In February 1525, Blarer started preaching in Konstanz and he soon became a leading figure of the local Reformation. With his cousin and co-reformer Johannes Zwick and their brothers, Konrad Zwick and Thomas Blarer respectively, who were members of the city council (Thomas later became mayor), Blarer had a spiritually as well as influentially effective team to continue the reformation.

The Konstanz Reformers were very idealistic, hoping to cleanse the city of all sin and evil. In 1526, a moral law was passed which prohibited dancing, drinking, swearing, adultery, etc. Enforcing the law proved difficult at first, until a new strategy was introduced in 1531; from then on all citizens had to take turns in functioning as moral guardians, reporting every violation of the law to the council. This eliminated the danger of the people‘s anger at the rules to be directed at any one person, as well as the danger of systematically overlooking friends and family.

Another speciality of the Constance Reformation was their love for music. Ambrosius wrote many educational and religious songs which were sung as part of the liturgy. Several of his songs can still be found in the Swiss Evangelical Hymn-Book.

== Correspondence and influence ==
Like Martin Bucer of Strasbourg, Blarer‘s theology was greatly influenced by both Zwingli and Luther. He tried to find a position which was acceptable to both parties, which mainly led to his exclusion from both groups. In 1530, Constance signed the Tetrapolitan Confession, the „Zwinglian“ counterpart of the Augsburg Confession, which was neither accepted by the Lutherans nor the Zwinglians. The Tetrapolitan Confession was also signed by Strasbourg (Bucer was its author) and by Memmingen and Ulm, two cities for which Blarer was the main reformer.

Ambrosius Blarer kept up a wide network of correspondence to many reformers. The best known among them included: Philip Melanchthon, Huldrych Zwingli, John Calvin, Martin Bucer, Heinrich Bullinger, Andreas Karlstadt and Johannes Oecolampadius.

== Downfall ==
The ambitions of the Constance Reformers were shattered in 1548. Unlike the other members of the Schmalkaldic League, Constance had refused to negotiate with Emperor Charles V unless they could obtain the right to keep the Protestant faith. This ended in the battle at the city gates on August 6, 1548, which Constance lost, but to prevent further losses, the council finally had to agree to the Emperor‘s conditions. Because they had refused negotiations for so long, they were not only forced to abandon their Protestant faith, but also lost their title of Imperial Free City and became subject to Catholic Habsburg Austria.

Blarer had already fled before the battle. He lived the rest of his life in exile, in Biel and Winterthur. In the Swiss Confederation he kept on preaching and advising numerous Protestants who turned to him for help. He died in Winterthur December 6, 1564.

== Publications ==
- Briefwechsel der Brüder Ambrosius und Thomas Blaurer, 1509-1548 (with Traugott Schiess and Thomas Blarer)
- Warhafft Verantwortung ... warumb er auß dem Kloster gewichen, vnd mit was geding er sich widerumb hynein begeben wol (1523)
- Jr gwalt ist veracht ir Kunst wirt verlacht ... ([Augsburg], 1524)
- Ermanung an eyn Ersamen Rath der Stat Co[n]stantz, Evangelische warhayt handt zu haben ([Nürnberg], 1524)
- Entschuldigung der Dienern des Evangeliums Christi … (1526)

He wrote several hymns including ‘Freu dich mit Wonn, o Christenheit' and 'Wach auf, waach auf, 's ist hohe Zeit'.

== Sources ==
1. Martin Burkhardt, Wolfgang Dobras, Wolfgang Zimmermann, "Konstanz in der frühen Neuzeit", Konstanz: Stadler Verlags Gesellschaft mbH, 1991 ISBN 3-7977-0259-0
2. ed. Traugott Schiess, "Briefwechsel der Brüder Ambrosius und Thomas Blaurer 1509-1567", Freiburg: Ernst Fehsenfeld, 1908
3. ed. Willi Bidermann, "Das reformatorische Meisterstück des Ambrosius Blarer"

Religious titles
Preceded by Oswald Myconius	Antistes of Basel; 1552–1553	Succeeded by Simon Sulzer
