= Sacramental union =

Lutheran doctrine of the real presence

Sacramental union (Latin: unio sacramentalis; Martin Luther's German: Sacramentliche Einigkeit; German: sakramentalische Vereinigung) is the Lutheran theological doctrine of the Real Presence of the body and blood of Christ in the Christian Eucharist (see Eucharist in Lutheranism).

== Type of union ==
The sacramental union is distinguished from the other "unions" in theology like the "personal union" of the two natures in Jesus Christ, the "mystical union" of Christ and his Church, and the "natural union" in the human person of body and soul. It is seen as similar to the personal union in the analogue of the uniting of the two perfect natures in the person of Jesus Christ in which both natures remain distinct: the integrity of the bread and wine remain though united with the body and the blood of Christ.

In the sacramental union the consecrated bread is united with the body of Christ and the consecrated wine is united with the blood of Christ by virtue of Christ's original institution with the result that anyone eating and drinking these "elements"—the consecrated bread and wine—really eats and drinks the true body and blood of Christ as well. Lutherans maintain that what they believe to be the biblical doctrine of the manducatio indignorum ("eating of the unworthy") supports this doctrine over and against the Reformed idea of Spiritual Presence, which teaches that only believers partake of Christ in the Supper. The manducatio indignorum is the contention that even unbelievers eating and drinking in the Eucharist really eat and drink the body and blood of Christ. This view was put forward by Martin Luther in his 1528 Confession Concerning Christ's Supper:

Why then should we not much more say in the Supper, "This is my body," even though bread and body are two distinct substances, and the word "this" indicates the bread? Here, too, out of two kinds of objects a union has taken place, which I shall call a "sacramental union," because Christ’s body and the bread are given to us as a sacrament. This is not a natural or personal union, as is the case with God and Christ. It is also perhaps a different union from that which the dove has with the Holy Spirit, and the flame with the angel, but it is also assuredly a sacramental union.

It is asserted in the Wittenberg Concord of 1536 and in the Formula of Concord. The Formula of Concord couples the term with the circumlocution ("in, with, and under the forms of bread and wine") used among Lutherans to further define their view:

For the reason why, in addition to the expressions of Christ and St. Paul (the bread in the Supper is the body of Christ or the communion of the body of Christ), also the forms: under the bread, with the bread, in the bread [the body of Christ is present and offered], are employed, is that by means of them the papistical transubstantiation may be rejected and the sacramental union of the unchanged essence of the bread and of the body of Christ indicated.

== Words of Institution ==
Lutherans believe that the words spoken by Jesus Christ at his Last Supper, the Words of Institution, bring about the sacramental union then and at all times whenever the Christian Eucharist is celebrated according to his mandate and institution.

Thus it is not our word or speaking but the command and ordinance of Christ that, from the beginning of the first Communion until the end of the world, make the bread the body and the wine the blood that are daily distributed through our ministry and office. Again, "Here, too, if I were to say over all the bread there is, 'This is the body of Christ,' nothing would happen, but when we follow his institution and command in the Lord’s Supper and say, 'This is my body,' then it is his body, not because of our speaking or of our efficacious word, but because of his command in which he has told us so to speak and to do and has attached his own command and deed to our speaking."

== Distinction from other doctrines of the Real Presence ==
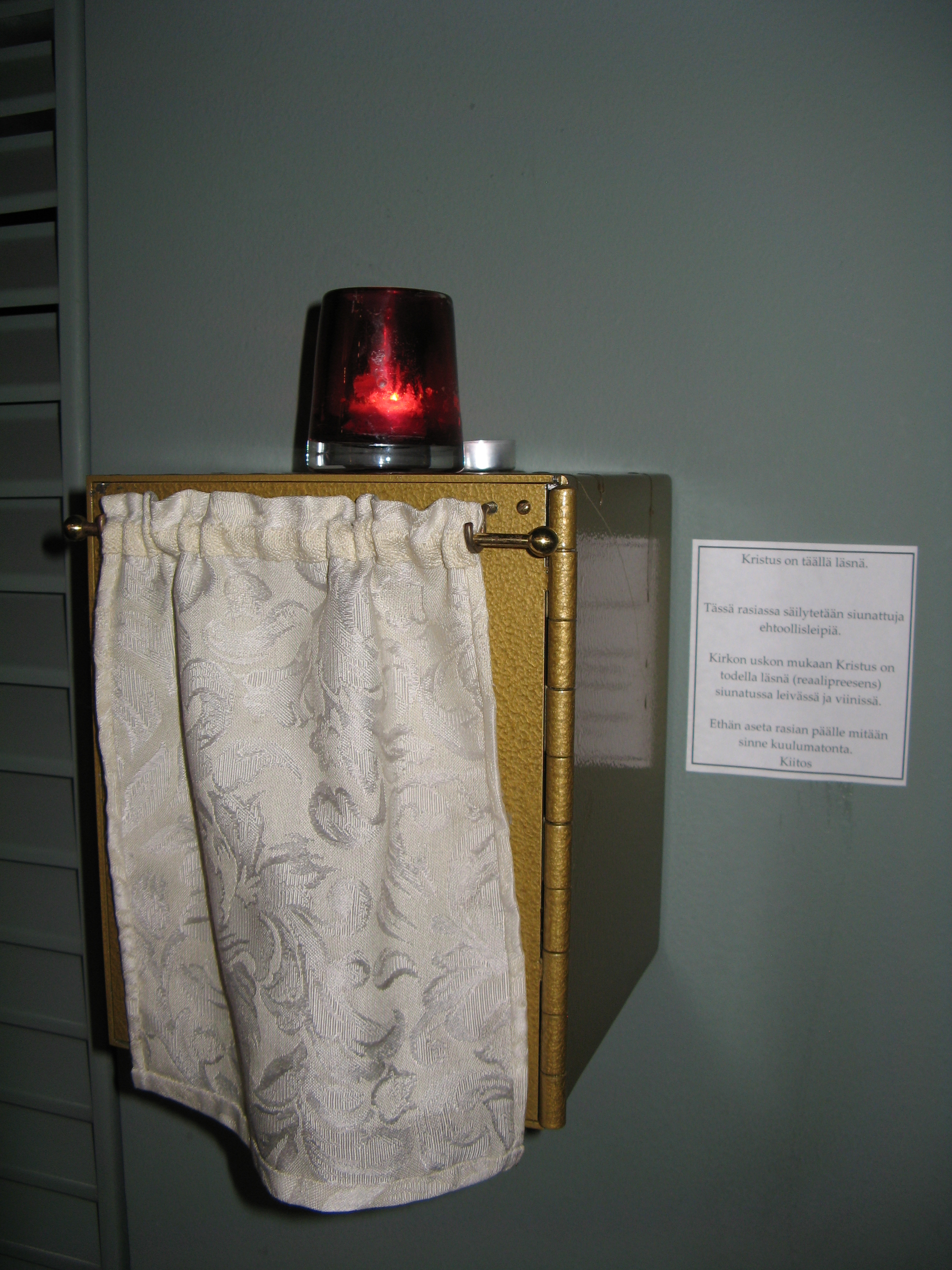
A note about the real presence in Mikael Agricola Church, Helsinki.

This view is sometimes erroneously identified as consubstantiation in that it asserts the simultaneous presence of four essences in the Eucharist: the consecrated bread, the body of Christ, the consecrated wine, and the blood of Christ; but it differs in that it does not assert a "local" (three-dimensional, circumscribed) presence of the body and blood in the sacramental bread and wine respectively, which is rejected as "gross, carnal, and Capernaitic" in the Formula of Concord. The term "consubstantiation" has been associated with such a "local" inclusion of the Body and Blood of Christ in the sacramental bread and wine as has the term "impanation." Lutherans have also rejected the designation of their position as consubstantiation because they believe it, like transubstantiation, is a philosophical explanation of the Real Presence, whereas the sacramental union provides a description of the Real Presence.

Martin Luther distinguished this doctrine from that of transubstantiation and impanation in this way:

… we do not make Christ's body out of the bread … Nor do we say that his body comes into existence out of the bread [i.e. impanation]. We say that his body, which long ago was made and came into existence, is present when we say, "This is my body." For Christ commands us to say not, "Let this become my body," or, "Make my body there," but, "This is my body."

The Lutheran doctrine of the sacramental union is also distinct from the Reformed view. The Calvinistic view of Christ's presence in the Lord's Supper (a real, spiritual presence) is that Christ is truly present at the meal, though not substantially and particularly joined to the elements. This is in line with their general belief that "the finite cannot contain the infinite" (finitum non est capax infiniti). Lutherans, on the other hand, describe the Personal Union of the two natures in Christ (the divine and the human) as sharing their predicates or attributes more fully. The doctrine of the sacramental union is more consistent with this type of Christology. The Lutheran scholastics described the Reformed Christological position which leads to this doctrine as the extra calvinisticum, or "Calvinistic outside," because the Logos is thought to be outside or beyond the body of Christ.

Reformed theology also uses the term "sacramental union", not as an explanation of Christ's presence but in reference to the union between "sign and thing signified."

== See also ==
- Confession Concerning Christ's Supper
- Crypto-Calvinism
- Eucharistic theologies contrasted
- Marburg Colloquy
- Martin Luther
- Real Presence

== Bibliography ==
- Luther, Martin. D. Martin Luthers Werke, Kritische Gesamtausgabe. 65 vols. Weimar: Verlag Hermann Böhlaus Nochfolger, 1883- (The comprehensive Weimar Edition of Luther's works in German and Latin).
- _____. Luther's Works: American Edition. Jaroslav Jan. Pelikan, and Helmut T. Lehmann, gen. eds. 55 vols. St. Louis: Concordia Publishing House; Philadelphia: Fortress Press, 1955–86.
- Triglot Concordia: The Symbolical Books of the Ev. Lutheran Church. St. Louis: CPH, 1921 (An English translation of the Book of Concord).
