= Peter Werenfels =

Swiss theologian (1627–1703)

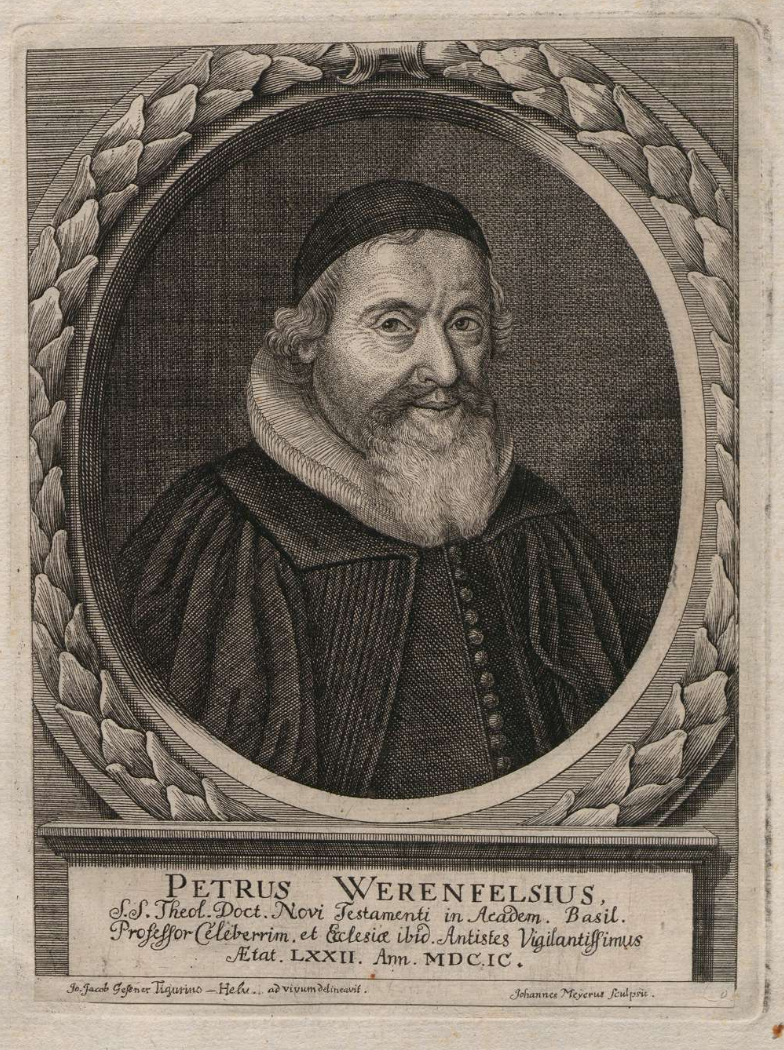
- Born: May 20, 1627; Basel, Switzerland
- Died: May 23, 1703 (aged 76); Münster, Germany
- Education: University of Basel
- Occupations: Professor, antistes
- Spouse: Margaretha Grynaeus
- Children: Samuel Werenfels
- Theological work
- Tradition or movement: Reformed, Calvinist

Peter Werenfels (May 20, 1627 – May 23, 1703) was a Swiss theologian, professor at the University of Basel and antistes of the Basel church. He served as the doctoral advisor of prominent mathematician Jacob Bernoulli.
