= Confession of Basel =

The Confession of Basel is one of the many statements of faith produced by the Reformation. It was put out in 1534 and must be distinguished from the First and Second Helvetic Confessions, its author being Oswald Myconius, who based it on a shorter confession promulgated by Oecolampadius, his predecessor in the church at Basel. Though it was an attempt to bring into line with the reforming party both those who still inclined to the old faith and the Anabaptist section, its publication provoked a good deal of controversy, especially on its statements concerning the Eucharist. The people of Strasbourg even reproached those of Basel with celebrating a Christless supper. Up to the year 1826 the Confession (sometimes also known as the Confession of Mühlhausen from its adoption by that town) was publicly read from the pulpits of Basel on the Wednesday of Passion week in each year. In 1872 a resolution of the great council of the city practically annulled it.
