= All Morgen ist ganz frisch und neu =

Lutheran morning hymn, 1541

- Lutheran hymn
- English: Every morning is quite fresh and new
- Written: 1541
- Text: by Johannes Zwick
- Language: German
- Melody: by Johann Walter
- Composed: 1537

"All Morgen ist ganz frisch und neu" (Every morning is quite fresh and new) is a morning hymn with a text written by Johannes Zwick in 1541. The Lutheran hymn became popular in the 1920s and was then connected to a 1537 melody by Johann Walter. It appears in hymnals including the Protestant Evangelisches Gesangbuch and in many songbooks. It has been translated into English as "Each morning brings us fresh outpoured" and into other languages.

== History ==
The jurist and theologian Johannes Zwick worked in Konstanz as an important figure of the Reformation in the region. He was also active in education of children and care for refugees. He wrote the text of "All Morgen ist ganz frisch und neu", originally in eight stanzas of four lines each, around 1541. It was published in 1545, after Zwick's death, in a booklet Christlicher ganz tröstlicher Unterricht (Christian quite comsoling lesson).

In 1927 two hymnologists found the text of the Lutheran hymn. For publication, they shortened it to four stanzas and connected it to a melody that Johann Walter had intended for Luther's "Vom Himmel hoch, da komm ich her", but Luther used his own melody instead. Their version became popular and appears in hymnals including the Protestant Evangelisches Gesangbuch, as EG 440, and in many songbooks. The Reformed hymnal of Switzerland features six stanzas.

The hymn has been translated into English as "Each morning brings us fresh outpoured" by Margaret Barclay in 1951, into Esperanto as "Novigas freŝe ĉe l' aŭror" by Adolf Burkhardt, into French as "Fraiche et nouvelle chaque jour" by Pauline Martin, and into Polish as "Co rano łaska nowa twa" by Tadeusz Sikora.

== Text ==
The poem has four to eight stanzas, depending on the version, of four lines each, rhyming AABB. It reflects the light of every morning and connects it to God's mercy and faithfulness. The first stanza is based on a verse from the Book of Lamentations. In the following stanzas, several aspects of light are explored. The last stanza is a prayer for steadfast faith without separation from God.

German

1) All Morgen ist ganz frisch und neu
des Herren Gnad und große Treu;
sie hat kein End den langen Tag,
drauf jeder sich verlassen mag.

2) Drum steht der Himmel Lichter voll,
dass man zum Leben sehen soll
und es mög schön geordnet sein,
zu ehren Gott, den Schöpfer dein.

3) So hat der Leib der Augen Licht,
dass er dadurch viel Guts ausricht
und seh auf Gott zu aller Frist
und merk, wie er so gnädig i

4) O Gott, du schöner Morgenstern,
gib uns, was wir von dir begehrn:
Zünd deine Lichter in uns an,
lass uns an Gnad kein Mangel han.

5) Treib aus, o Licht, all Finsternis,
behüt uns, Herr, vor Ärgernis,
vor Blindheit und vor aller Schand
und reich uns Tag und Nacht dein Hand,

6) zu wandeln als am lichten Tag,
damit, was immer sich zutrag,
wir stehn im Glauben bis ans End
und bleiben von dir ungetrennt.

Translation:
English

Each morning brings us fresh out-poured
the loving kindness of the Lord.
It ends not as the day goes past,
but gives us strength while life shall last.

O God, the star of dawning day,
give us that light for which we pray.
Your holy flame within us glow,
that we no lack of grace may know.

Walk with us in the light of day,
that we may ever, come what may,
in hope endure, in faith be strong;
abide in us our whole life long.
