= Manducatio impiorum =

Manducatio impiorum ("eating by the impious”) refers to those who eat the Lord's Supper but do not believe all Christian doctrine including the rejection of the real presence in the Lord's Supper. Martin Luther and the Gnesio Lutherans held to this view, which is codified in the Epitome of the Formula of Concord VII found in the Book of Concord. Philipp Melanchthon and his followers, the Philippists, with the Reformed denied this teaching including Huldrych Zwingli and John Calvin Calvin believed that Christ's body is given to all communicants, but only received by those who have faith. Lutherans refer to this as the receptionist error. It relates to doctrine of the real presence of Christ in the Eucharist, and, in particular, to the interpretation of 1 Corinthians 11:27–29:

Therefore, whoever eats the bread or drinks the cup of the Lord in an unworthy manner will be guilty of sinning against the body and blood of the Lord. A man ought to examine himself before he eats of the bread and drinks of the cup. For anyone who eats and drinks without recognizing the body of the Lord eats and drinks judgment on himself.

Manducatio impiorum is different than Manducatio indignorum, which refers to the unworthy eating of the Supper by Christians due to unrepentance.

== See also ==
- Sacramental Union
- Wittenberg Concord
- Martin Bucer
- Article 29 of the Thirty-Nine Articles
