= Simon Grynaeus =

German theologian (1493–1541)

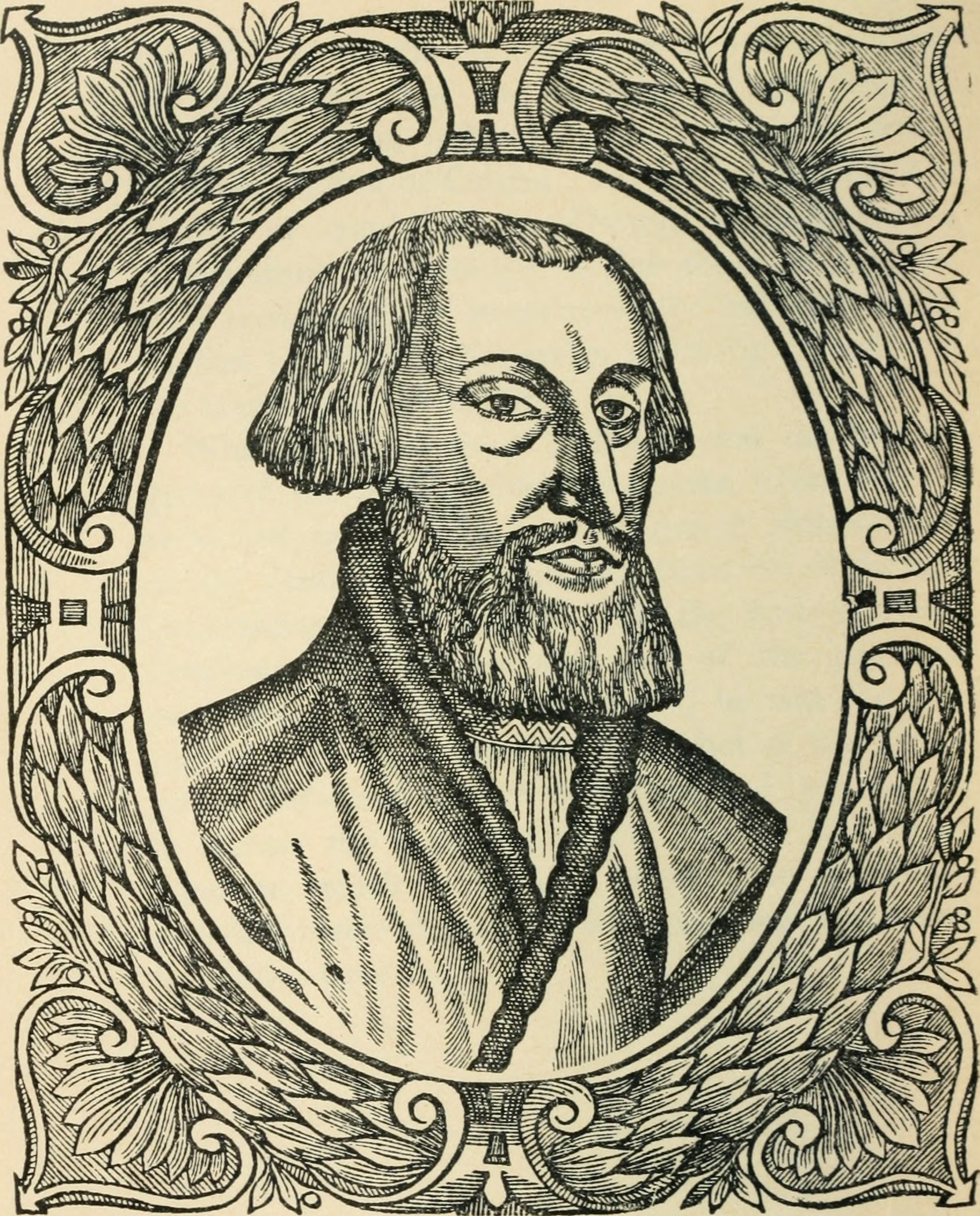
- Portrait of Grynaeus in Theodore Beza's Icones (1580)

Signature
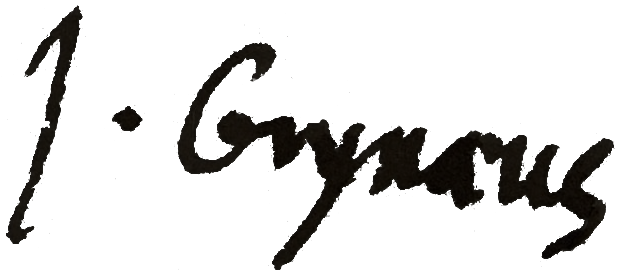

Simon Grynaeus (born Simon Griner; 1493 – 1 August 1541) was a German scholar and theologian of the Protestant Reformation.

== Biography ==
Grynaeus was the son of Jacob Gryner, a Swabian peasant, and was born at Veringendorf, in Hohenzollern-Sigmaringen. He adopted the name "Grynaeus" from the epithet of Apollo in Virgil. He was a schoolmate of Melanchthon at Pforzheim. He then went on to study at the University of Vienna, distinguishing himself there as a Latinist and Hellenist.

His appointment as rector of a school at Buda was of no long continuance: his views excited the zeal of the Dominicans, and he was thrown into prison. He gained his freedom at the instance of Hungarian magnates, visited Melanchthon at Wittenberg. In 1524 he became professor of Greek at the University of Heidelberg, being in addition professor of Latin from 1526. His Zwinglian view of the Eucharist disturbed his relations with his Catholic colleagues. From 1526, he had corresponded with John Oecolampadius, who in 1529 invited him to Basel, which Erasmus had just left. The university being disorganized, Grynaeus pursued his studies, and in 1531 visited England for research in libraries.

A commendatory letter from Erasmus gained him the good offices of Sir Thomas More. He returned to Basel charged with the task of collecting the opinions of continental reformers on the subject of Henry VIII's divorce. He was present at the death of Oecolampadius (24 November 1531). He now, while holding the chair of Greek, was appointed extraordinary professor of theology, and gave exegetical lectures on the New Testament.

In 1534, Duke Ulrich called him to Württemberg in aid of the Reformation there, as well as for the reconstitution of the University of Tübingen. He carried out this work with Ambrosius Blarer of Constance. Two years later, he had an active hand in the so-called First Helvetic Confession (the work of Swiss divines at Basel in January 1536); also in the conferences which urged the Swiss acceptance of the Wittenberg Concord (1536).

At the Worms conference (1540) between Catholics and Protestants, he was the sole representative of the Swiss churches, being deputed by the authorities of Basel. He died suddenly by the plague at Basel on 1 August 1541. A brilliant scholar, a mediating theologian, and personally of lovable temperament, his influence was great and wisely exercised. Erasmus and John Calvin were among his correspondents. His chief works were Latin versions of Plutarch, Aristotle and John Chrysostom, and the editing of the first printed version of Euclid's Elements in ancient Greek.

== Family ==
His son Samuel (1539–1599) was professor of jurisprudence at Basel. His nephew Thomas (1512–1564) was professor at Basel and minister in Rötteln, and left four distinguished sons of whom Johann Jakob was a leader in the religious affairs of Basel.

The last of the direct descendants of Simon Grynaeus was his namesake Simon (1725–1799), translator into German of French and English anti-deistical works, and author of a version of the Bible in modern German (1776).
