= Rudolf Gwalther =

Swiss Reformed pastor and Protestant reformer

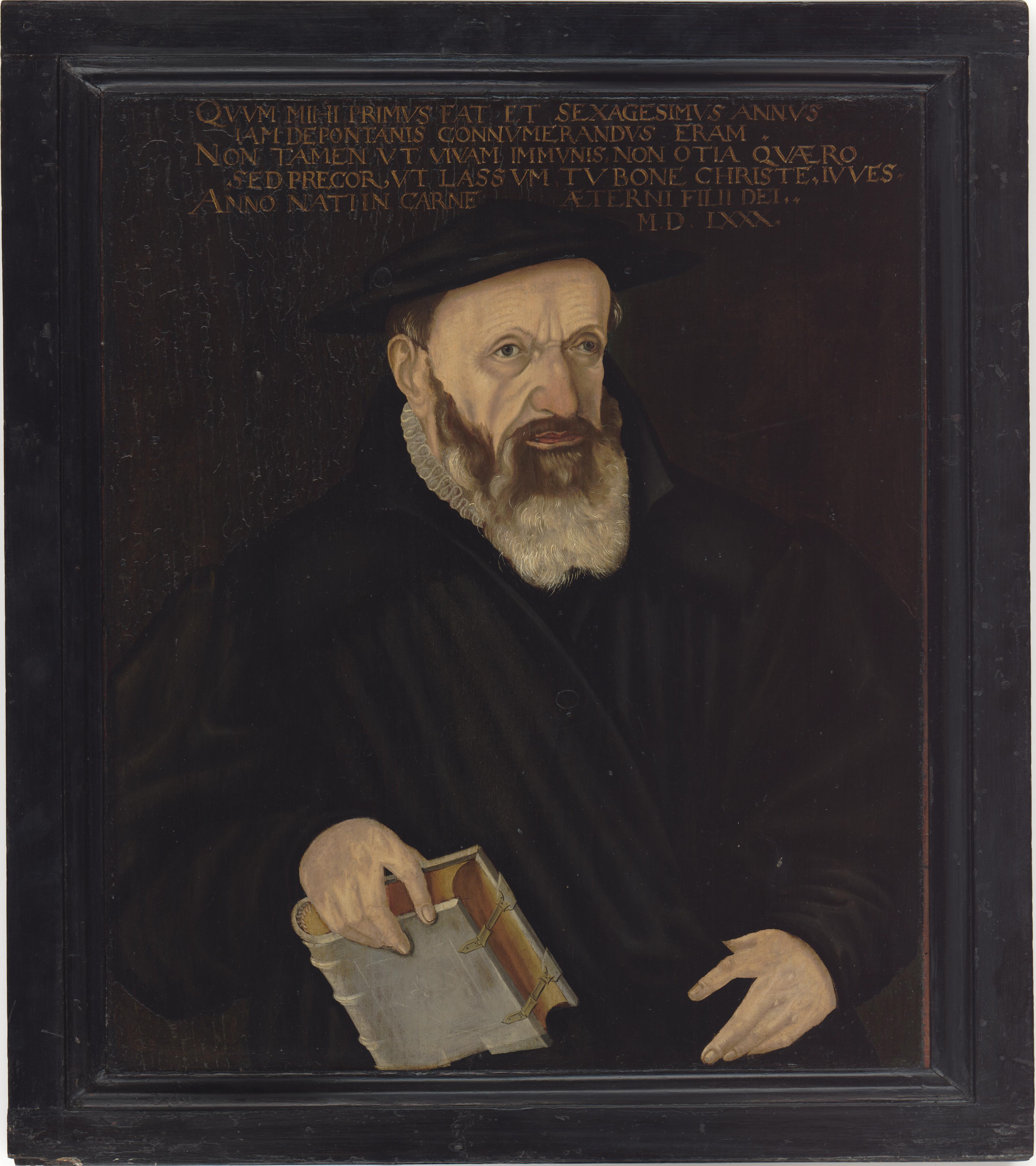
Rudolf Gwalter (1580)

Rudolf Gwalther (2 October 1519 – 25 December 1586) was a Swiss Reformed pastor and Protestant reformer who succeeded Heinrich Bullinger as Antistes of the Zurich church; he was also an author and translator.

== Life ==
Gwalther was born the son of a carpenter, who died when he was young. Heinrich Bullinger assumed responsibility for Gwalther's upbringing. He attended schools in Kappel, Basel, Strasbourg, Lausanne and Marburg. He studied mathematics and poetry in addition to theology, French and Italian. Landgrave Philip of Hesse brought the gifted student along to the Regensburg Colloquy in 1541.

When he returned to Zurich the following year he received the pastorate of St Peter's Church to replace Leo Jud.

In 1542 he married Huldrych Zwingli's daughter Regula (1524–1565); a year after her death, he married Anna Blarer.

He was an inspiring and popular preacher. His sermons and biblical commentaries have been frequently printed and widely read. As Zwingli's son-in-law, he sought to preserve the great reformer's heritage and remained true to his theological orientation. Gwalther's Latin translations of Zwingli's works helped disseminate his thought in the Romance language world.

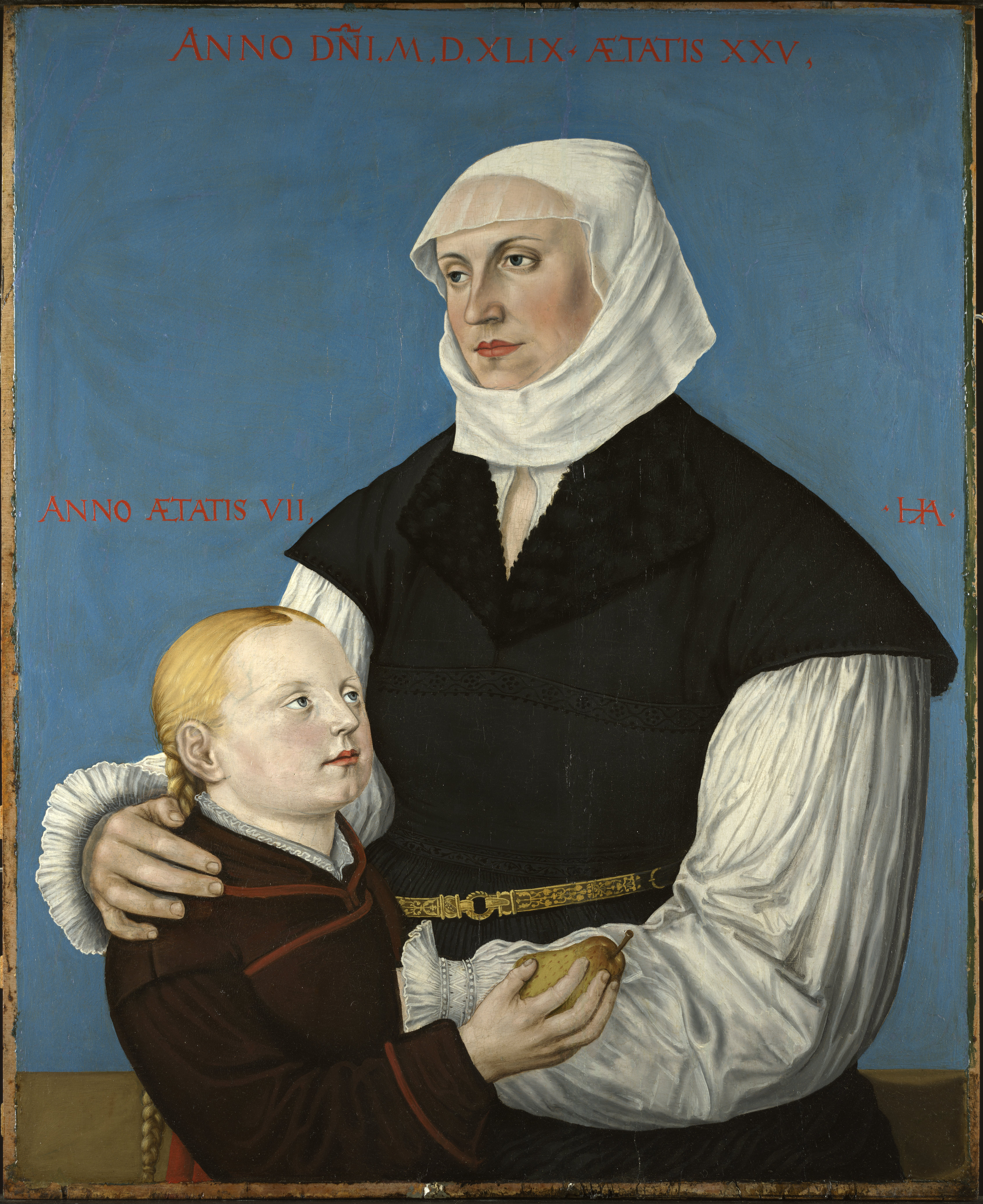
Gwalther's wife Regula and Daughter Anna, painting by Hans Asper

For Bullinger, he was a valuable collaborator in the management of the Zurich church and in assisting with his widely dispersed correspondence network. Outside of historical narratives, he produced numerous translations, and composed Latin poems and spiritual songs. Following Bullinger's wish, Gwalther was elected in 1575 as his successor as Antistes at the Grossmünster. He held this difficult office until 1585, when his declining mental state forced him from the post. He was succeeded as head of the Zurich church by his longtime colleague Ludwig Lavater.

== Influence ==
He had contacts with English Calvinists through John Parkhurst, in exile in Zurich in the 1550s. His works were one of the influences on the English vestments controversy of the 1560s; and his sermons were translated by Robert Norton of Ipswich in the 1570s. His son, Rudolf Gwalther the younger (1552–77), likewise enhanced his influence in England when he studied in Oxford in the early 1570s. Gwalther was in regular communication with English bishops. With Zwingli, Bullinger, Wolfgang Musculus, and Thomas Erastus, Gwalther was a prime advocate of the Swiss German single-sphere model of church-state relations, and was a significant influence on the evolution of a statist model of church organization within the Church of England.

== Publications ==
Gwalter’s works include;

- Orthodoxa Tigvrinæ Ecclesiæ ministrorum Confessio (1545)
- Der Endtchrist (1546)
- A short description of Antichrist vnto the nobilitie of Englande, and to all my brethren and contreymen borne and dwelling therin, with a warnynge to see to, that they be not deceaued by the hypocrisie and crafty conueyaunce of the clergie. (1555)
- True reporte, that Antichriste is come. (1556)
- Nabal comoedia sacra (1562)
- Whether it be a mortall sinne to transgresse ciuil lawes which be the commaundementes of ciuill magistrates (1570), with Philipp Melanchthon, Heinrich Bullinger, Martin Bucer, and Matthew Parker
- An admonition to the Parliament (1572) with John Fielde, Théodore de Bèze, and Thomas Wilcox
- Certaine godlie homelies or sermons upon the prophets Abdias and Jonas. (1573)

== Sources ==
- J. Wayne Baker (1996) "Rudolf Gwalther," in Hans J. Hillerbrand, ed., The Oxford Encyclopedia of the Reformation, vol 2, 203. ISBN 0-19-506493-3

Religious titles
Preceded by Heinrich Bullinger	Antistes of Zürich; 1575-1585	Succeeded by Ludwig Lavater
