= Johannes Wolleb =

Swiss Protestant theologian

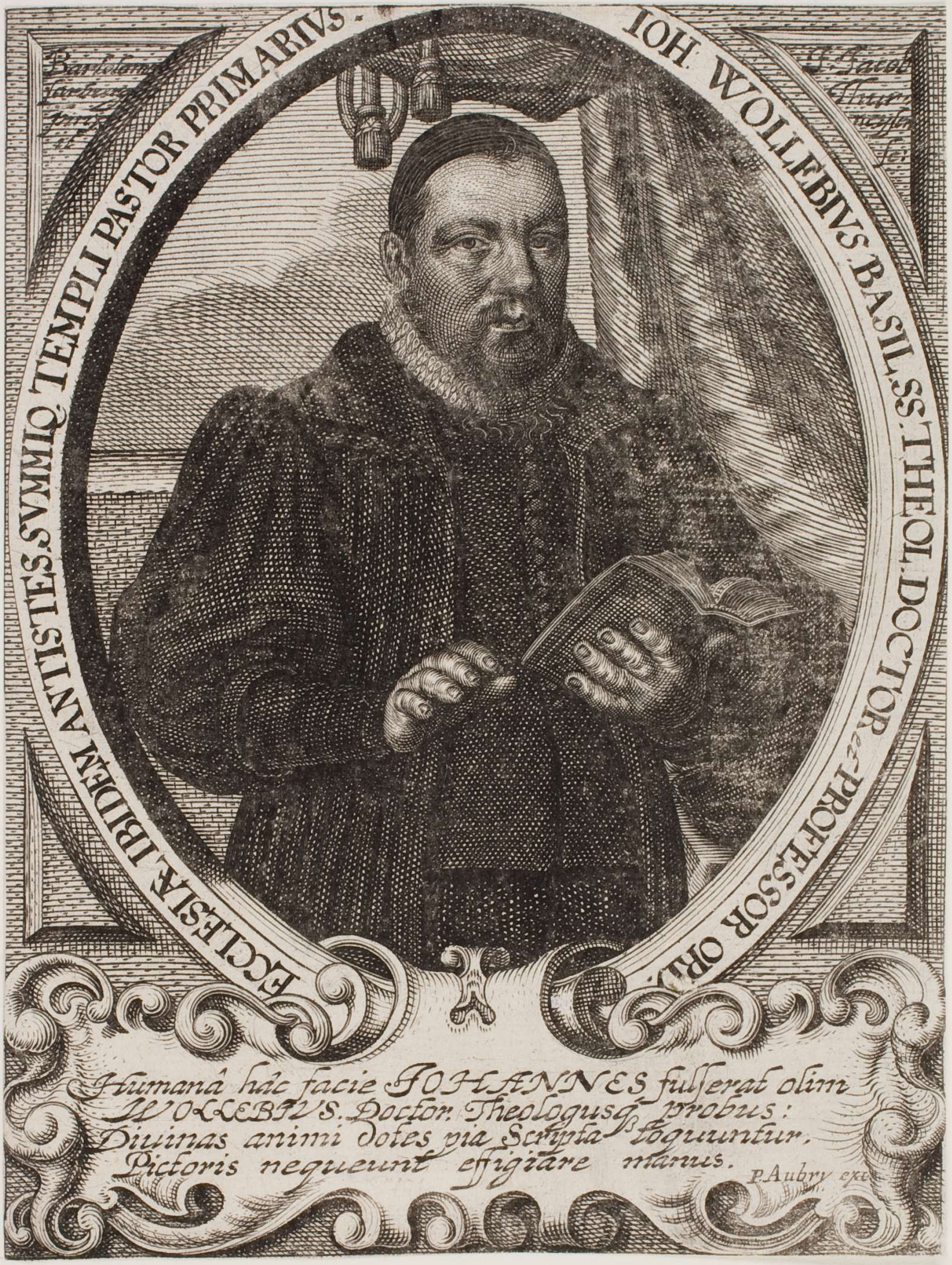
Portrait of Johannes Wolleb in the early 1600s

Johannes Wolleb (Wollebius) (1589–1629) was a Swiss Protestant theologian. He was a student of Amandus Polanus, and followed in the tradition of a Reformed scholasticism, a formal statement of the views arising from the Protestant Reformation.

He was the successor of Johann Jakob Grynaeus at Basel Cathedral. The Compendium Theologiae Christianae of 1626 is his major work; it is shorter than the Syntagma Theologiae Christianae (1609) of Polanus, and served as an abridgement and development. It was translated into English by Alexander Ross, as Abridgement of Christian Divinitie (1650).

Wolleb influenced the Westminster Shorter and Larger Catechisms. His Compendium, with William Ames's Medulla, and Francis Turretin's writings, were used as textbooks into the 18th century and beyond. In the late 17th century, Wolleb's system began to displace Ames's in favour at Harvard University. Students at Yale University in the early 18th century used to study the Abridgement every Friday afternoon; the books by Wolleb and Ames were written into the university Regulations (1745). In April 1784, the Compendium Theologiae was replaced with work from the new dissenting academies in England. Philip Doddridge (1712-1749) whose "Course of Lectures on Pneumatology, Ethics and Divinity became the new primary text for the divinity. Harvard began to separate the Divinity School from the 'other views'. This action placed the Divinity school's use of Wolleb's works squarely into the newly formed Divinity school at Harvard.

== Notes ==
Religious titles
Preceded by Johann Jakob Grynaeus	Antistes of Basel; 1618–1629	Succeeded by Theodor Zwinger the Younger
