= Confession Concerning Christ's Supper =

1528 treatise by Martin Luther

Confession Concerning Christ's Supper (1528) (German: Vom Abendmahl Christi, Bekenntnis) is a theological treatise written by Martin Luther affirming the Real Presence of the body and blood of Christ in the Eucharist, defining Luther's position as the sacramental union. Notable among its respondents were Huldrych Zwingli and Johannes Oecolampadius, who denied the Real Presence. Luther also discussed the eucharistic views of John Wycliffe in this document.

The third part of the work is a concise confession of Luther's Christian faith.

== Original German text ==
- Luthers Werk: Weimarer Ausgabe, vol. 26, pp. 261–509
- Martin Luther: Studienausgabe, vol. 4, pp. 13–258

== English translation ==
- Luther's Works: American Edition, vol. 37, pp. 161–372
