= Thomas Grynaeus =

German theologian, reformer, and pastor

Thomas Grynaeus (born Thomas Griner; 1512, Veringendorf – 2 August 1564 Rötteln) was a theologian, reformer and pastor.

== Life ==
Thomas Grynaeus grew up the son of a peasant in the Veringendorf, Württemberg. Grynaeus's uncle Simon Grynaeus was a school friend Philipp Melanchthon. Thomas studied Greek and Latin in Heidelberg and Basel and followed Simon Sulzer to the Bern Academy, where he served as professor of Classical languages. He was released from his post for introducing Lutheran views of the Lord's Supper. He moved to Basel served as teacher and later prefect (1547) of the Basel Pädagogium. After the Reformation of the Baden-Durlach by Margrave Charles II in 1556, Grynaeus became pastor in 1558 at St. Gallus' Church, Lörrach and superintendent in Rötteln, where he remained to his death in 1564.

Thomas Grynaeus married Adelheid Steuber and had eleven children with her, including Simon Grynaeus the Younger and Johann Jakob Grynaeus, who succeeded his father as pastor in Rötteln.
