= Girolamo Zanchi =

Italian Reformed theologian (1516–1590)

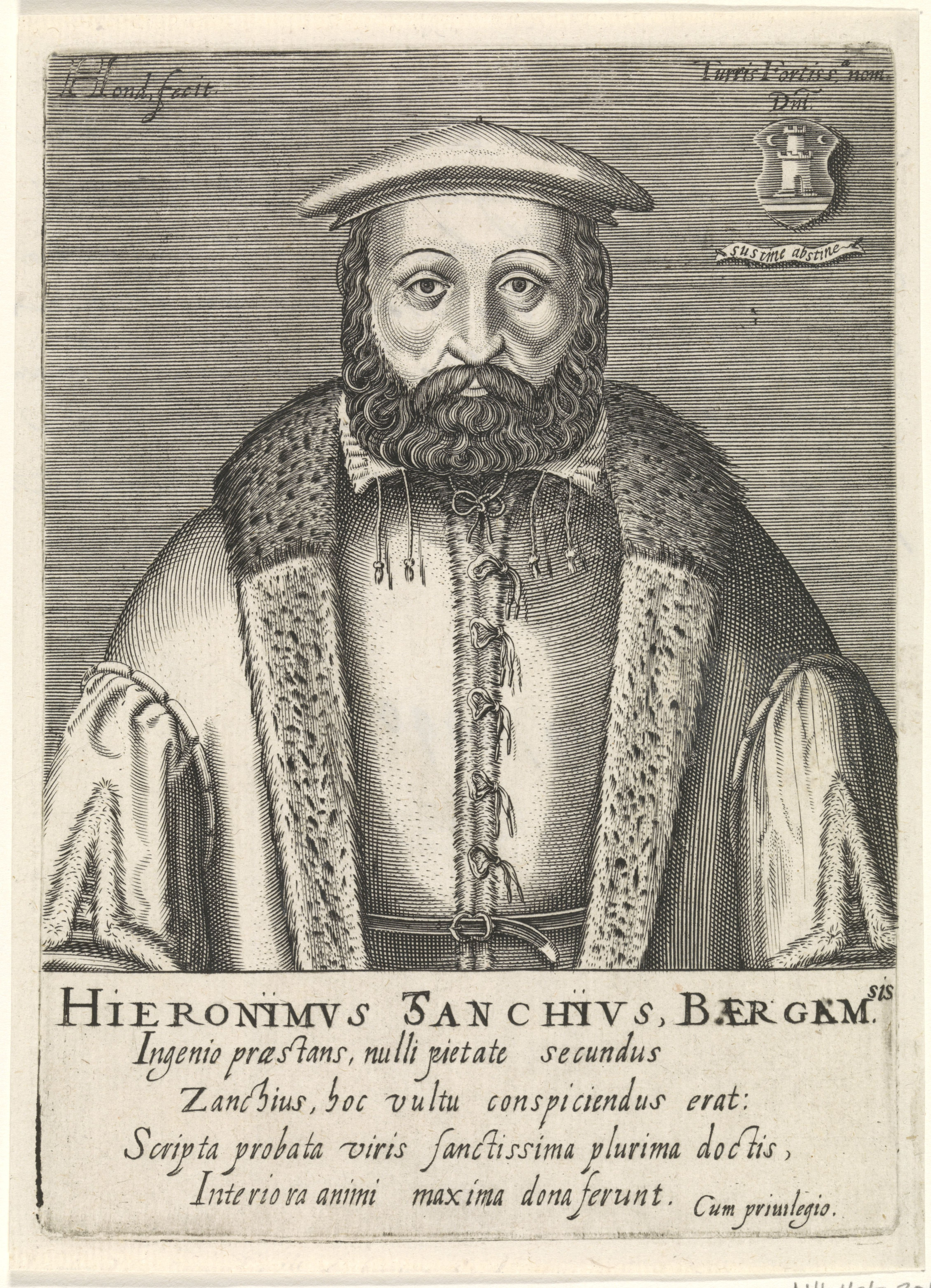
Portrait by Hendrik Hondius I

Girolamo Zanchi (Latin: Hieronymus Zanchius, thus Anglicized to "Jerome Zanchi/Zanchius"; February 2, 1516 – November 19, 1590) was an Italian Protestant Reformer, clergyman and educator who influenced the development of Reformed theology during the years following John Calvin's death.

== Life ==
He was born the son of a noble lawyer and historian, in Alzano Lombardo near Bergamo. His father died in the plague of 1528 and his mother died only three years later. At age 15 he entered the monastery of the Augustinian Order of Regular Canons, where he studied Aristotle, languages and divinity. After completing his studies, he went to Lucca, and there under the influence of Peter Martyr Vermigli he opted for a theological career, being especially impressed by Vermigli's lectures on Romans. In addition to works of the Fathers, he became aware of Martin Bucer and Philipp Melanchthon, also read Martin Luther's writings and the Swiss reformers. John Calvin, however, had the greatest influence on him.

Even after Vermigli’s forced flight in 1542, Zanchi remained as a teacher of Greek at the monastery school. In 1551, however, he also was forced into exile. After a brief stay in Geneva, he wanted to go to England, but was called to Strasbourg and worked there as a professor of the Old Testament at the college of St. Thomas. His style is legalistic, and he interpreted with meticulous accuracy. In his overall theological orientation, he has been described as "a Calvinist in terms of theological content, and a Thomist in terms of philosophy and methodology." He was one of the most learned theologians of the second half of the 16th Century, if he is not considered to be an especially original thinker. He was regarded an excellent teacher. He married a daughter of Caelius Secundus Curio.

The demand for Strasbourg faculty and pastors to commit themselves to the Augsburg Confession created difficulties for him. He had previously declined offers to move to Geneva and Lausanne because he was committed to Strasbourg. However, he could not remain after the controversy with the Lutheran superintendent Johann Marbach. Zanchi had described the differences in the doctrine of the Eucharist between the Lutheran and Reformed as being relatively minor and also taught a strict Calvinist doctrine of predestination. After receiving many consultations from theologians outside of Strasbourg, the disputing parties were able to reach an agreement in constructing a formula of unity (The Strasbourg Consensus) signed by all the city's preachers and professors.

When Calvin chided him for his equivocation, Zanchi went public with his views again causing the controversy to erupt anew. He consequently left from Strasbourg to become the pastor of the Italian Protestant congregation in the Graubünden in Chiavenna. In 1568 he received a call to the University of Heidelberg, where he took over the chair of Dogmatics formerly occupied by Zacharias Ursinus. Here he wrote important works which tend to bear either an apologetic or polemical character. His method of presentation is quite scholastic. After the Electorate of the Palatinate returned to Lutheranism during the reign of Elector Ludwig VI, Zanchi moved with many other Reformed professors to the Casimirianum, a Reformed academy in Neustadt in the dominions of Count Palatine Johann Casimir. He died during a return visit to Heidelberg and was buried in the University Church.

== Thought ==
Zanchius was a voluminous writer whose works include Confession of the Christian Religion and Observation on the Divine Attributes. His The Doctrine of Absolute Predestination is still in publication today. His Operum theologicorum has also been extremely influential. One chapter from this work has been called "the Protestant equivalent of Aquinas's Treatise on Law," and has recently been translated into English and published as On the Law in General (2012). In this work, Zanchius repeatedly refers to natural law, arguing that its authority is equal to that of the Decalogue: "Because the Decalogue defines and describes the same things that are called natural law, the Ten Commandments themselves are often called 'natural law.'. . . It must be mentioned that just as Christ is the fulfillment of the entire Mosaic law, so, too, is he the fulfillment of natural law because, as human beings are convicted of sin through the law, they flee to Christ for forgiveness." While his debt to Aquinas is evident throughout the Operum theologicorum, he parts with Aquinas's conception of natural law due to disagreement in interpreting Romans 2:14-15. Zanchi argues that natural law should be seen as moral knowledge that God has universally and directly “reinscribed” on the human mind after the Fall, rather than as a "relic of the original image of God” or some “essential part of human nature."

== Epitaph ==
The following is a translation of the inscription on the headstone of Zanchius' grave:

Here Zanchius rests, whom love of truth constrained
to quit his own and seek a foreign land.
How good and great he was, how formed to shine,
How fraught with science human and divine;
Sufficient proof his numerous writings give,
And those who heard him teach and saw him live.
Earth still enjoys him, though his soul has fled:
His name is deathless, though his dust is dead.
