= Johann Jakob Grynaeus =

Swiss divine (1540–1617)

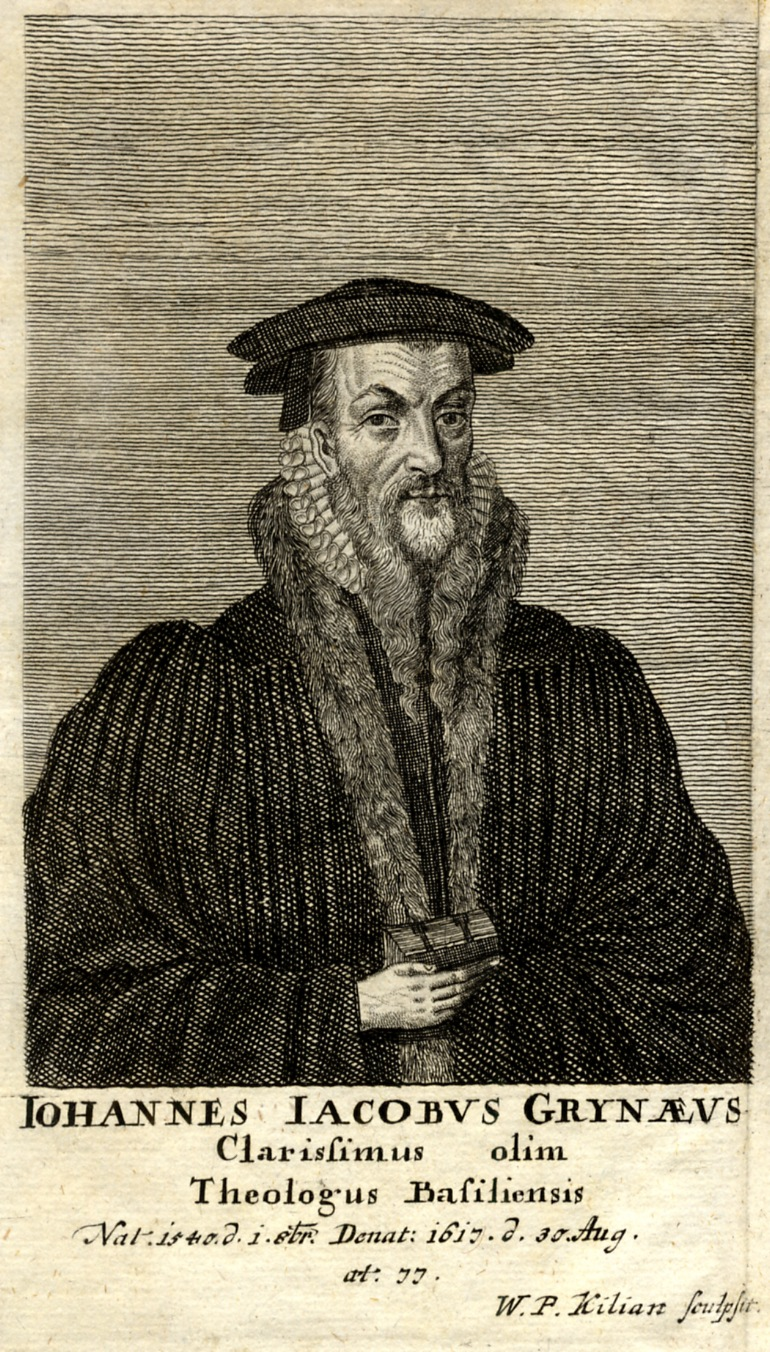
Johann Jakob Grynaeus.

Johann Jakob Grynaeus or Gryner (October 1, 1540 – August 13, 1617) was a Swiss Protestant divine.

== Life ==
Grynaeus was born in Bern. His father, Thomas Grynaeus (1512–1564), was for a time professor of ancient languages at Basel and Bern, but afterwards became pastor of Röteln in Baden. Thomas was also a nephew of the eminent Humanist Simon Grynaeus.

Johann was educated at Basel, and in 1559 received an appointment as curate to his father. In 1563 he proceeded to Tübingen for the purpose of completing his theological studies, and in 1565 he returned to Rötteln as successor to his father. Here he felt compelled to abjure the Lutheran doctrine of the Lord's Supper, and to renounce the Formula of Concord.

Called in 1575 to the chair of Old Testament exegesis at Basel, he became involved in unpleasant controversy with Simon Sulzer and other champions of Lutheran orthodoxy. In 1584 he accepted an invitation to assist in the restoration of the University of Heidelberg.

He returned to Basel in 1586, after Simon Sulzer's death, as Antistes or superintendent of the church there and as professor of the New Testament. He exerted for upwards of twenty-five years a considerable influence upon both the church and the state affairs of that community, and acquired a wide reputation as a skillful theologian of the school of Huldrych Zwingli. Amongst other labors he helped to reorganize the gymnasium in 1588. Five years before his death he became totally blind, but continued to preach and lecture until his death.

He died in Basel, aged 76.

== Works ==
His many works include commentaries on various books of the Old and New Testament, Theologica theoremata et problemata (1588), and a collection of patristic literature entitled Monumenia S. patrum orthodoxographa (2 volumes, folio, 1569).

Inn 1569, Grynaeus published the first edition of several letters of the hermits Barsanuphius of Gaza and John the Prophet together with the letters of Dorotheus of Gaza.

Other works include, Chronologia brevis Evangelicae Historiae (1580), Decas prima thesium de historia fidei Christianae (1582) and Definitio Sanguinis Aeterni Testamenti (1591).

Religious titles
| Preceded by Simon Sulzer | Antistes of Basel; 1585–1618 | Succeeded by Johannes Wolleb |
