= Samuel Preiswerk =

Swiss theologian and hymn writer (born1799)

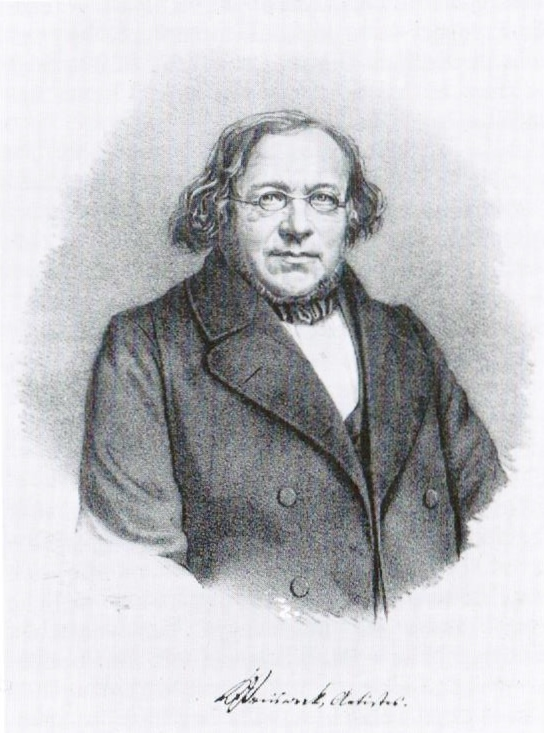
- Occupations: pastor, teacher
- Notable work: Hebrew Grammar
- Theological work
- Language: Swiss, German, French
- Tradition or movement: Lutheran
- Main interests: Hebrew language, Hymn poetry

Samuel Preiswerk (Rümlingen, 19 September 1799 – Basel, 13 January 1871) was a Swiss Reformed Lutheran theologian, pastor and church hymn poet. He is the maternal grandfather of Carl Jung.

== Biography ==
Preiswerk was born in 1799, in Basel, Switzerland, the son of Alexander Preiswerk and Anna Maria Preiswerk. He studied in Basel and Erlangen. In Biel-Benken in 1822 he found work as a vicar. Two years later he became pastor at an orphanage and in 1828 a teacher in a missionary house. During this period he wrote some hymns, which later lead to international recognition. In 1830 he became a pastor in Muttenz. He was removed as pastor when he refused to conduct pro-revolution prayers. In 1834 he became a teacher at Theological School of the Evangelical Society in Geneva. His Hebrew Grammar work was released there, written in French, and went through four editions. Seeking to maintain his connection with representatives of Edward Irving his job was lost in 1837. He moved to Basel in 1839, and in 1840 became a Hebrew teacher and pastor at St. Leonhard Church. From 1859 he was pastor of the Münster parish, later rising to director of the church and school system. In Basel, he published the magazine Das Morgenland. In 1860 he received an honorary doctorate of theology from the University of Basel.

== Works (selection) ==
- Hebrew Grammar: Preceded By A Historical Note On The Hebrew Language (original French Grammaire hébraïque précédé d'un précis historique sur la langue hébraïque)
- Paradigms of the perfect verb, imperfect verbs and nouns of the Hebrew language, taken from Hebrew grammar (original French Paradigmes du verbe parfait, des verbes imparfaits et des noms de la langue hébraïque, extraits de la grammaire hébraïque)
- The Work is Thine, Lord Jesus Christ (original German Die Sach ist dein, Herr Hesu Christ) (1829; MG 427) www.hymntime.com
- Hark, The Church Proclaims Her Honor, (original German Das ist der Gemeine Stärke) (1844) www.hymntime.com
