= Collegium helveticum =

Seminary in Milan for Swiss Catholic clergy (1579–1935)

- Other name: Collegium borromaeum
- Type: Seminary
- Active: 1579–1935 (moved to Venegono)
- Founder: Pope Gregory XIII
- Affiliations: Catholic Church
- Religious affiliation: Catholic
- Location: Milan, Italy
- Campus: Urban

The Collegium helveticum (also known as Collegium borromaeum) was a seminary established in Milan during the Catholic Reformation to train clergy for Catholic Switzerland, Grisons, Valais, and their subject territories. Founded in 1579 under the direction of Charles Borromeo, it served as the most important center of theological education for Swiss Catholics until its relocation to Venegono in 1935.

== History ==
=== Foundation ===
The establishment of the Collegium helveticum arose from the acute shortage of seminaries in Switzerland following the Council of Trent's requirements for clerical education. During the second half of the 16th century, the Catholic Church and lay representatives of the Catholic Reformation advocated for opening positions in Italian seminaries for Swiss students. Pope Pius V authorized the Archbishop of Milan to accept a certain number of Swiss students in his seminary, which soon encouraged the creation of a specific college for Swiss students.

Pope Gregory XIII established the college's foundations between 1576 and 1579 through four endowments, with the requirement to accommodate at least fifty Swiss students. In 1582, Cardinal Mark Sittich von Hohenems instituted twenty-four additional places for his Diocese of Constance. Under his direction and administration, the college inaugurated its own building in 1579, which was later reconstructed under Bishop Federico Borromeo.

=== Administration and organization ===
The Catholic cantons had influence in both the administration and selection of scholarship recipients. The institution was directed by the Oblates of Saint Ambrose, a congregation founded by Charles Borromeo. Initially, courses were taught by Jesuits, but the Oblates later took over the educational responsibilities as well. Besides the scholarship students, young Italians also attended the college, which reached up to one hundred students during its period of prosperity.

=== 18th century development ===
During the 18th century, the college employed remarkable professors and came under the influence of progressive scholars such as Lodovico Antonio Muratori. It became the most important center of theological formation for the cantons of Uri, Grisons, and Ticino. Many of its former students occupied influential positions in their homeland, and through them, the spirit of the Catholic Reformation and the Enlightenment spread during the second half of the 18th century. Notable representatives included Bernhard Ludwig Göldlin from Lucerne and Karl Joseph Ringold from Uri.

=== Suppression and revival ===
As part of his reforms, Emperor Joseph II confiscated the building in 1786, which had been constructed in the 17th century according to plans by renowned Italian architects, notably Francesco Maria Richini. The theology students were relocated to the University of Pavia. Napoleon suppressed the college in 1797 and attributed its assets to the main hospital of Milan.

The former rights were partially restored in 1842, when Austria contractually committed to providing twenty-four funded places for Swiss Catholics in the archiepiscopal seminary of Milan. When the Austrian occupation of Lombardy ended, this commitment was taken over by the Sardinian State in 1860 and later by the Italian government. The scholarships continued to be actively used, with 366 students attending the institution between 1842 and 1900, mostly from Ticino, Grisons, and Uri.

=== Final relocation ===
In 1935, the seminary was moved to Venegono near Varese. The two world wars and increasing costs, with scholarship recipients having to contribute a growing share, resulted in decreased demand for the positions. The building was only reoccupied in 1958 through an initiative launched in 1930 by the Altmailänderverband, an association of alumni who had completed their theological studies in Milan.

== Bibliography ==
- H. Steiner, Rechtsgutachten betreffend die schweizerischen Freiplätze am erzbischöflichen Priesterseminar in Mailand, ms., 1959 (KBUR)
- Festschrift zur 400-Jahr-Feier der Errichtung des Collegio Elvetico (Schweizer Seminar) durch Kardinal Karl Borromäus im Oktober 1579, 1979
- H. Wicki, Staat, Kirche, Religiosität, 1990, 164–165
- S. Della Torre, "I palazzi del Collegio Elvetico e del Seminario Maggiore di Milano", in L'architettura del Collegio tra XVI e XVII secolo in area lombarda, éd. G.C. Zanella, 1996, 77–88
- W. Hörsch, J. Bannwart, Luzerner Pfarr- und Weltklerus 1700-1800, 1998
