= Ludwig Lavater =

Swiss Reformed theologian

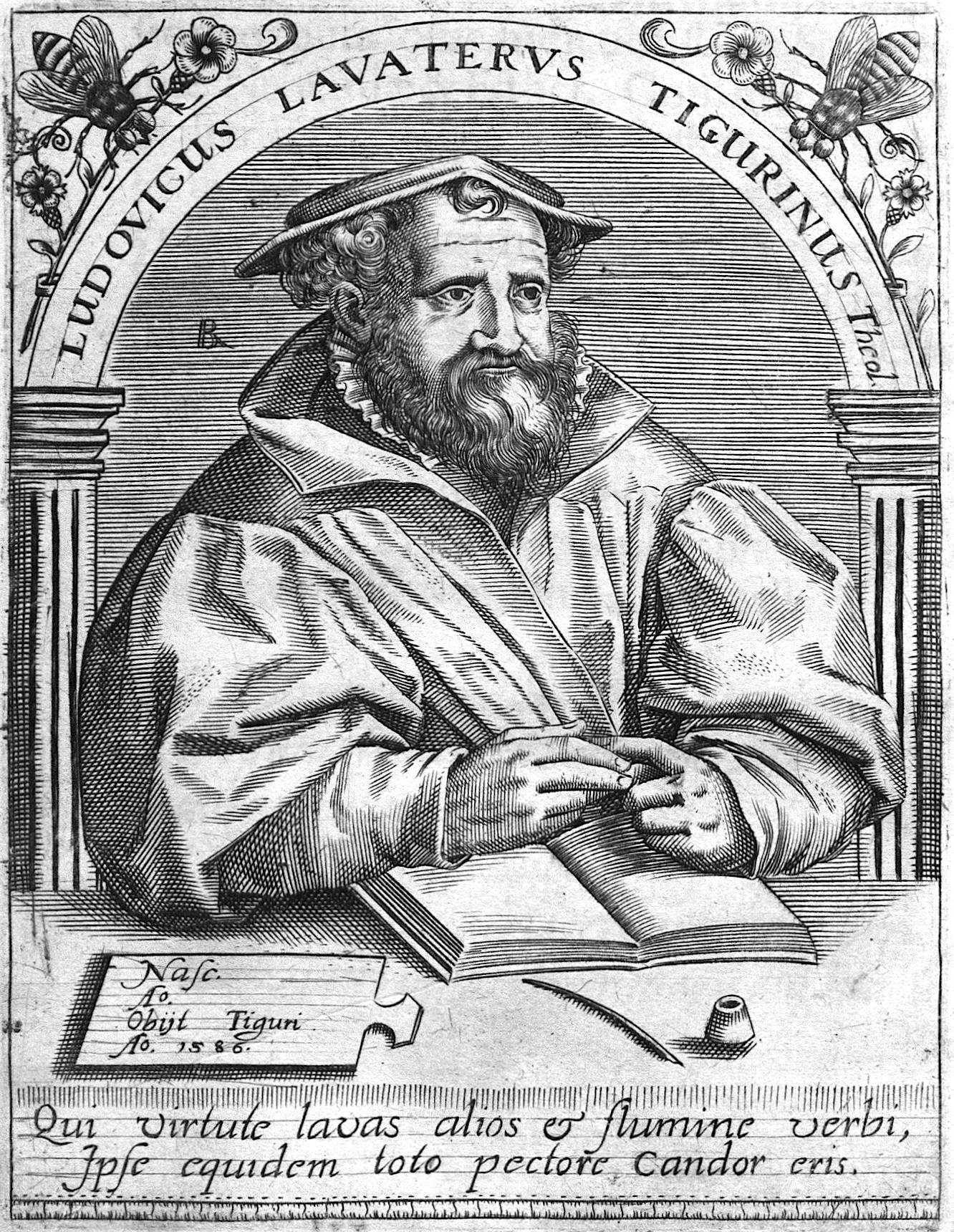
Ludwig Lavater

Ludwig (Lewes) Lavater (4 March 1527; Kyburg (castle) – 5 July 1586 in Zürich) also known as Lewes Lauaterus of Tigurine, was a Swiss Reformed theologian working in the circle of his father-in-law, Heinrich Bullinger. He was the chief pastor of the Calvinist Church of Zürich. He served as Archdeacon at the Grossmünster in Zurich and briefly Antistes of the Zurich church as the successor of Rudolf Gwalther.

Lavater was a prolific author, composing homilies, commentaries, a survey of the liturgical practices of the Zurich church, a history of the Lord's Supper controversy, as well as biographies of Bullinger and Konrad Pellikan. His work on ghosts (De spectris ...) was one of the most frequently printed demonological works of the early modern period, going into at least nineteen early modern editions in German, Latin, French, English and Italian.

== Life ==
Lavater was born to Hans Rudolf Lavater and Anna Rouchli.

Lavater married Margareta Bullinger on May 8th, 1550. They had 3 sons and 6 daughters together.

== Works ==
- De ritibus et institutis ecclesiae Tigurinae. 1559 (Modern edition: Die Gebräuche und Einrichtungen der Zürcher Kirche. Zürich: Theologischer Verlag, 1987. ISBN 3-290-11590-9
- Historia de origine et progressu controversiae Sacramentariae de Coena Domini, ab anno nativitatis Christi MDXXIIII. usque ad annum MDLXIII. Zurich: Christoph Froschauer, 1563.
- De spectris, lemuribus et magnis atque insolitis fragoribus.. Leiden, 1569.
- Von Gespänsten ..., kurtzer und einfaltiger bericht. Zürich, 1569 (VD 16 L 834).
- Von Gespänsten, in Theatrum de Veneficis. Frankfurt, 1586.

Religious titles
Preceded by Rudolf Gwalther	Antistes of Zürich; 1585-1586	Succeeded by John Rudolph Stumpf
