= Antistes =

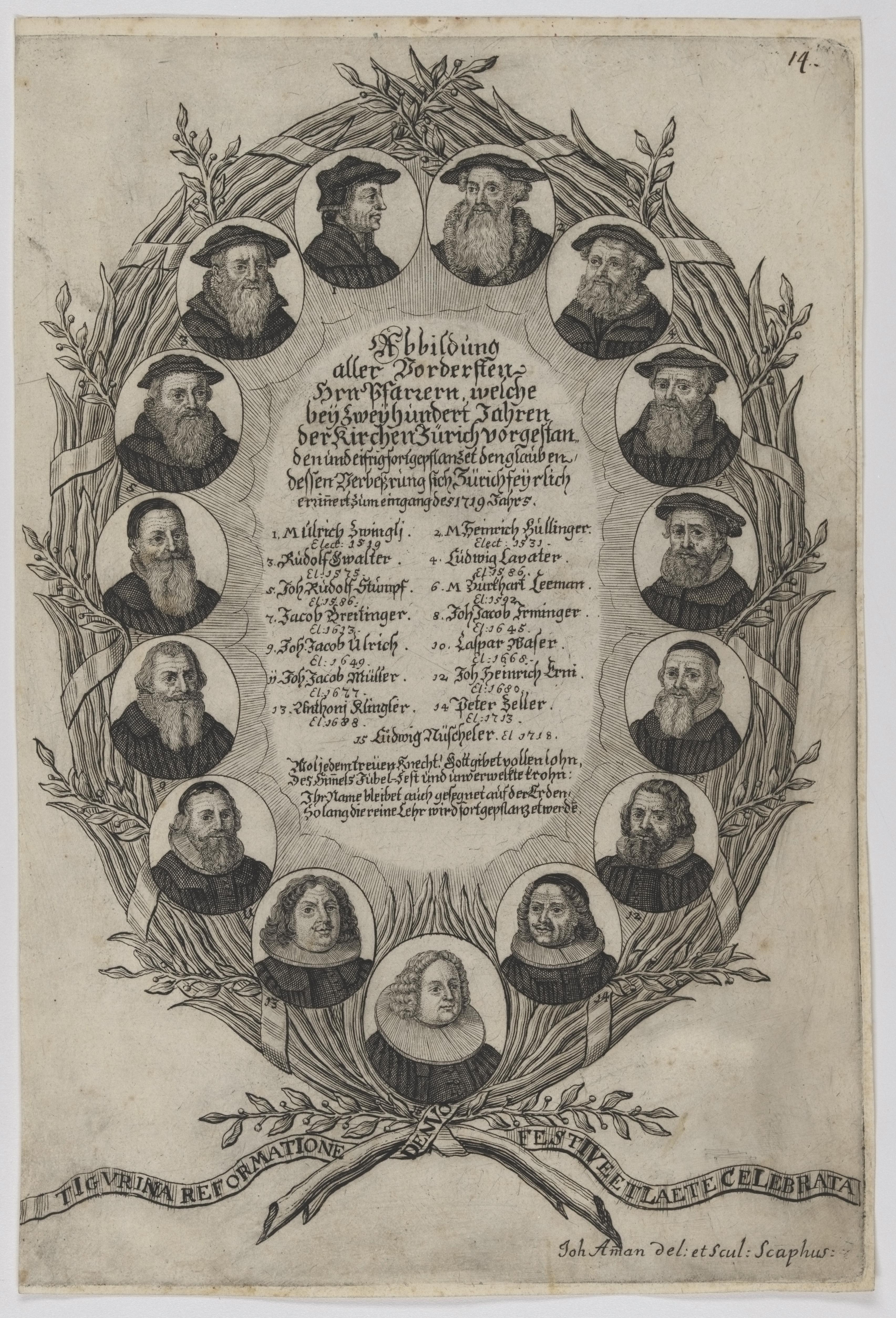
The Antistes of Zürich from Zwingli to Nüscheler

Antistes (from Latin ante "before" and sto "stand") was from the sixteenth to the nineteenth century the title of the head of a church in the Reformed Churches in Switzerland. It was the highest office in churches with synodal church governance.

The word was used first in 1525 as an unofficial title of honor for Huldrych Zwingli in Zürich, then in 1530 for Johannes Oecolampadius in Basel and in 1532 for Heinrich Bullinger in Zürich.

The antistes was elected by the great council (the parliament) of the city and also held besides this office a pastorship of one of the main churches.

The antistes had to be an ordained minister. He was the official representative of the church. He presided over the synod, and over the theological examinations of candidates for the office of pastor. His direct rights were very limited, but a man with high leadership capabilities like Zwingli or Bullinger could exert a great influence on the church in this office.

In the late nineteenth century the title was replaced by other office designations, e.g. church president or president of the church council.

Antistites were an early form of bishops, and were also recorded in records about the Bona Dea Temple of the late Roman Republic and pre-Christian early Roman Empire.

== Examples ==
Antistes of Zürich

- Huldrych Zwingli (1525–1531)
- Heinrich Bullinger (1532–1575)
- Rudolph Gualther (1575–1585)
- Ludwig Lavater (1585–1586)
- Johann Rudolf Stumpf (1586–1592)
- Burkhard Leeman (1592–1613)
- Johann Jakob Breitinger (1613–1645)
- Johann Jakob Irminger (1645–1649)
- Johann Jakob Ulrich (1649–1668)
- Hans Caspar Waser (1668–1677)
- Johann Jacob Muller (1677–1680)
- Johann Henry Erni (1680–1688)
- Anton Klingler (1688–1713)
- Peter Zeller (1713–1718)
- Johann Ludwig Nüscheler (1718–1737)
- Johann Conrad Wirz (1737–1769)
- Johann Rudolph Ulrich (1769–1795)
- Johann Jacob Hess (1795–29 May 1828)

Antistes of Basel

- Johannes Oecolampadius (1530–1531)
- Oswald Myconius (1531–1552)
- Ambrosius Blarer (1552–1553)
- Simon Sulzer (1553–1585)
- Johann Jakob Grynaeus (1585–1618)
- Johannes Wolleb (1618–1629)
- Theodor Zwinger the Younger (1630–1654)
- Lucas Gernler (1656–1675)
- Peter Werenfels (1675–1703)
- Hieronymus Falkeisen (1816-1838)
- Samuel Preiswerk (1859-1871)

Antistes of Schaffhausen

- Johann Conrad Ulmer (1569–1570)
- Melchior Habicht (1738-1817)

== Bibliography ==
- Good, James Issac (1913). History of the Swiss Reformed Church since the Reformation. Philadelphia: Publication and Sunday School Board of the Reformed Church in the United States.
- Antistes in the Historical Lexicon of Switzerland (in German)
