= Johann Jacob Hess (theologian) =

Swiss theologian (1741–1828)

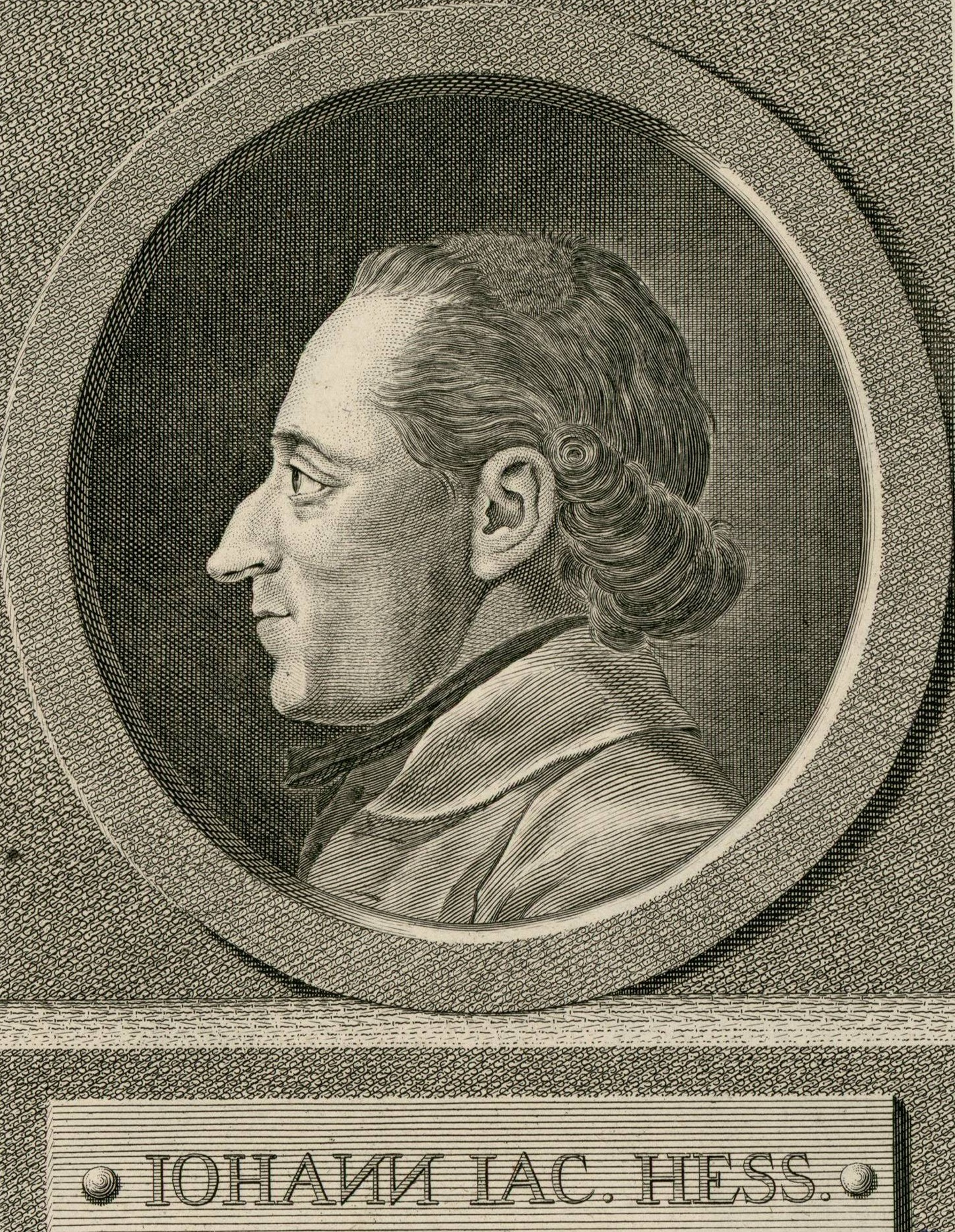
Johann Jakob Hess in 1775.

Johann Jacob Hess (or Johann Jakob Hess) (21 October 1741 in Zürich - 29 May 1828 in Zürich) was a Protestant Swiss theologian and clergyman.

== Life ==
Hess's father was the town clock maker Salomon Hess. He studied from 1755 to 1760 in Collegium Carolinum Zürich, followed by his ordination as Verbi divini minister In 1767 he married Anna Maria Schinz from Embrach, in 1777 he was appointed deacon of Fraumünster, in 1795 rector und Antistes of the clergy of the Canton of Zürich.

He is known as the pioneer of literature of the quest for the historical Jesus through his Geschichte der drei letzten Lebensjahre Jesu (Zürich 1768) and Lebensgeschichte Jesu (8th edition, 1823).

Posthumously published was his Briefe über die Offenbarung Johannis (Zürich 1844).

== Works ==
- Meine Bibel. Ein Gesang. Freunden d. Bibelanstalten gewiedmet von Johann Jakob Heß. 2., hdl..rm. u. verb. Auflage. Zürich: Orell, Füßli u. Co., 1821.
- Geschichte und Schriften der Apostel Jesu. Von dem Verfasser der Geschichte Jesu. 1773 1. Aufl., 1775 2. Aufl., Jew. Zürich. Dgl., - Mit einer Beilage von Anmerkungen für catholische Leser -, Salzburg, Mayr. 1791.
