= Oswald Myconius =

Swiss theologian (1488–1552)

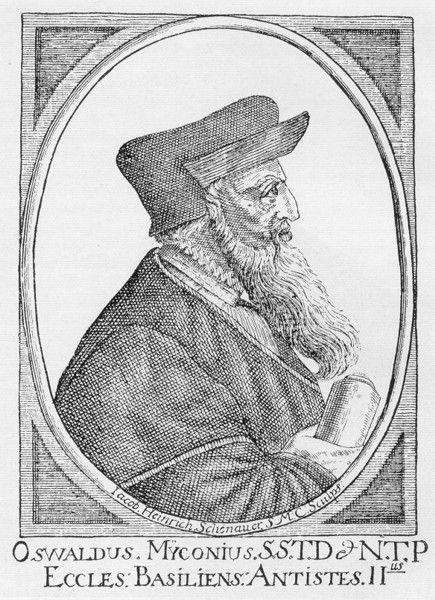
Oswald Myconius.

Oswald Myconius (1488 – 14 October 1552) was a Swiss Protestant theologian and Protestant reformer. He was a follower of Huldrych Zwingli.

== Life ==
He was born at Lucerne, Switzerland. His family name was Geisshüsler, and his father was a miller; hence he was also called Molitoris (Latin molitor, "miller"). The name Myconius is said to have been given him by Erasmus; it alludes to the proverbial expression bald-headed Myconian. From the school at Lucerne he went to the University of Basel to study classics. From 1514 he obtained teaching posts at Basel, where he married, and made the acquaintance of Erasmus and of Hans Holbein, the painter. In 1516 he was called, as schoolmaster, to Zürich, where (1518) he attached himself to the reforming party of Zwingli. This led to his being transferred to Lucerne and again, in 1523, reinstated at Zürich.

On the death of Zwingli (1531) he moved to Basel, where he held the office of town's preacher, and (till 1541) the chair of New Testament exegesis. In 1534 he authored the Confession of Basel; during his time there, he was known to be strict in how his people kept the moral laws. In confessional matters he was for a union of all Protestants. Although a Zwinglian, his readiness to compromise with the advocates of consubstantiation gave him trouble with the hard-line Zwinglians. He had, however, a distinguished follower in Theodore Bibliander. He died in Basel.

== Works ==
Among his several tractates, the most important is De H Zwinglii vita et obitu (1536), translated into English by Henry Bennet (1561). Other works included Tractatus de liberis rite educandis and De crapula et ebrietate, as well as Bekanthnus unsers heyligen Christenlichen gloubens, wie es die Kilch zuo Basel haltet and In Evangelivm Marci Docta Et Pia.

Religious titles
| Preceded by Johannes Oecolampadius | Antistes of Basel; 1532–1552 | Succeeded by Ambrosius Blarer |
