= Wittenberg Concord =

Religious concordat

Wittenberg Concord, is a religious concordat signed by Reformed and Evangelical Lutheran theologians and churchmen on 29 May 1536 as an attempted resolution of their differences with respect to the Real Presence of Christ's body and blood in the Eucharist. It is considered a foundational document for Evangelical Lutheranism but was later rejected by the Reformed.

The Reformed signers included Martin Bucer, Wolfgang Fabricius Capito, Matthäus Alber, Martin Frecht, Jakob Otter, and Wolfgang Musculus. The Lutheran signers included Martin Luther, Philipp Melanchthon, Johannes Bugenhagen, Justus Jonas, Caspar Cruciger, Justus Menius, Friedrich Myconius, Urban Rhegius, George Spalatin. This document defined the doctrine of the Real Presence of Christ's body and blood in the Eucharist as the Sacramental Union and maintained the real eating of the body and blood of Christ by "unworthy communicants" (manducatio indignorum).
