= Waser (disambiguation) =

Waser is a quarter in the district 3 of Winterthur, Switzerland.

Waser may also refer to:

- Waser family, a bourgeois family of Zurich
- Anna Waser (1678–1714), Swiss painter
- Caspar Waser (1565–1625), Swiss theologian
- Hans Caspar Waser (1612–1677), Swiss clergyman
- Hedwig Bleuler-Waser (1869−1940), founder of the Swiss Federation of Abstinent Women
- Heini Waser (1913–2008), Swiss painter (full name: Urs Heinrich Otto Waser)
- Hugo Waser (born 1936), Swiss Olympic rower
- Johann Heinrich Waser (mayor) (1600–1669), a mayor of Zürich, Switzerland
- Johann Heinrich Waser (statistician) (1742–1780), Swiss pastor and statistician
- Josias Waser (1598–1629), Swiss pastor
- Maria Waser (1878–1939), Swiss writer
- Stephan Waser (1920–1992), Swiss Olympic bobsledder
