= Johann Heinrich Waser =

Johann Heinrich Waser may refer to:

- Johann Heinrich Waser (mayor) (1600–1669), mayor of Zurich and diplomat
- Johann Heinrich Waser (statistician) (1742–1780), pastor and statistician

== See also ==
- Waser family
- Waser (disambiguation)
