= Jos Murer =

Swiss stained glass maker and cartographer (1530–1580)

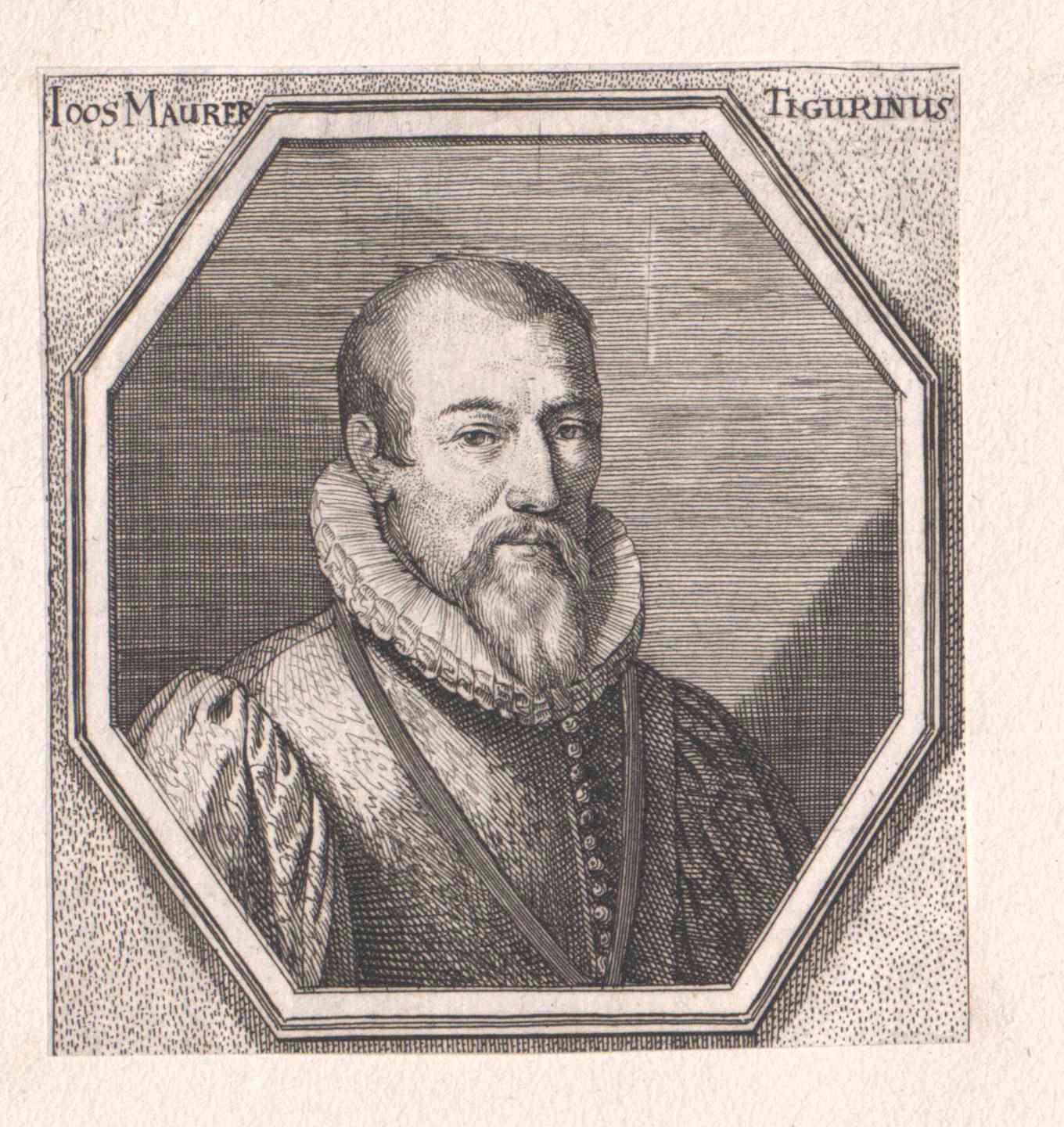
- Jos Murer, etching by Conrad Meyer (1675)
- Born: 5 September 1530; Zurich, Switzerland
- Died: October 1580; Winterthur, Switzerland
- Known for: Glass painting, cartography, book illustration, writing
- Notable work: Murerplan
- Spouse: Barbara Schön
- Children: 12, including Christoph Murer and Josias Murer

Jos Murer (5 September 1530 – October 1580) was a Swiss glass painter, cartographer, writer and politician from Zurich. He worked in book illustration and stained glass, producing portraits, woodcuts and heraldic and figurative panels, and he also wrote seven plays. In cartography, he designed the first printed map of the Zurich territory in 1566 and the 1576 Murerplan, the first bird’s-eye view of Zurich. He later served on Zurich’s Grand Council and as Amtmann in Winterthur.

== Biography ==
Jos Murer was born in Zurich on 5 September 1530. His father, Hans Murer, was a belt maker who served as a Zurich councillor and guild master. Murer trained in Zurich as a glass painter and glazier. Few details of Murer’s training and early career have survived.

In 1556, he married Barbara Schön, whose father, Caspar Schön, was a woodcarver from Speyer. The couple had six sons and six daughters. Their children included the artists Christoph Murer and Josias Murer. Murer owned the house Zum Nägeli in Zurich, whose facade bears the arms of the Murer and Schön families.

In 1572, Murer joined the Zunft zur Saffran and became a member of Zurich’s Grand Council. In 1578, he was appointed Amtmann in Winterthur and later moved into the official residence there. He died in Winterthur following a short illness in October 1580.

== Work ==
Murer worked as a glass painter, draughtsman, cartographer, woodcut artist and writer. In Protestant Zurich, attitudes towards images restricted many forms of visual art, while book illustration and stained glass provided greater scope for artistic work.

=== Illustration and portraiture ===
Murer designed title borders, vignettes, views and portraits for works printed by Christoph Froschauer. A title border from 1553 is the earliest signed graphic work documented for him. He prepared drawings for Conrad Gessner’s Historiae animalium.

Murer produced portraits of Johannes Fries in 1554, Conrad Gessner for the 1555 bird volume of Historia animalium, and Conrad Pellican in 1556. Murer also contributed signed botanical drawings to Gessner's unpublished plant studies.

Murer's illustrations included eighteen full-page woodcuts for Johannes Fries’s 1561 edition of Virgil, four of them signed. The series formed a major part of Murer's graphic output, and the stylistic consistency of the unsigned illustrations supports attribution of the complete set to him. For the Bucolica and Georgica, he drew on Sebastian Brant's earlier Virgil illustrations, generally reversing the compositions. In the Aeneid series, he typically foregrounded the main episode and placed secondary action in the background.

=== Stained glass ===
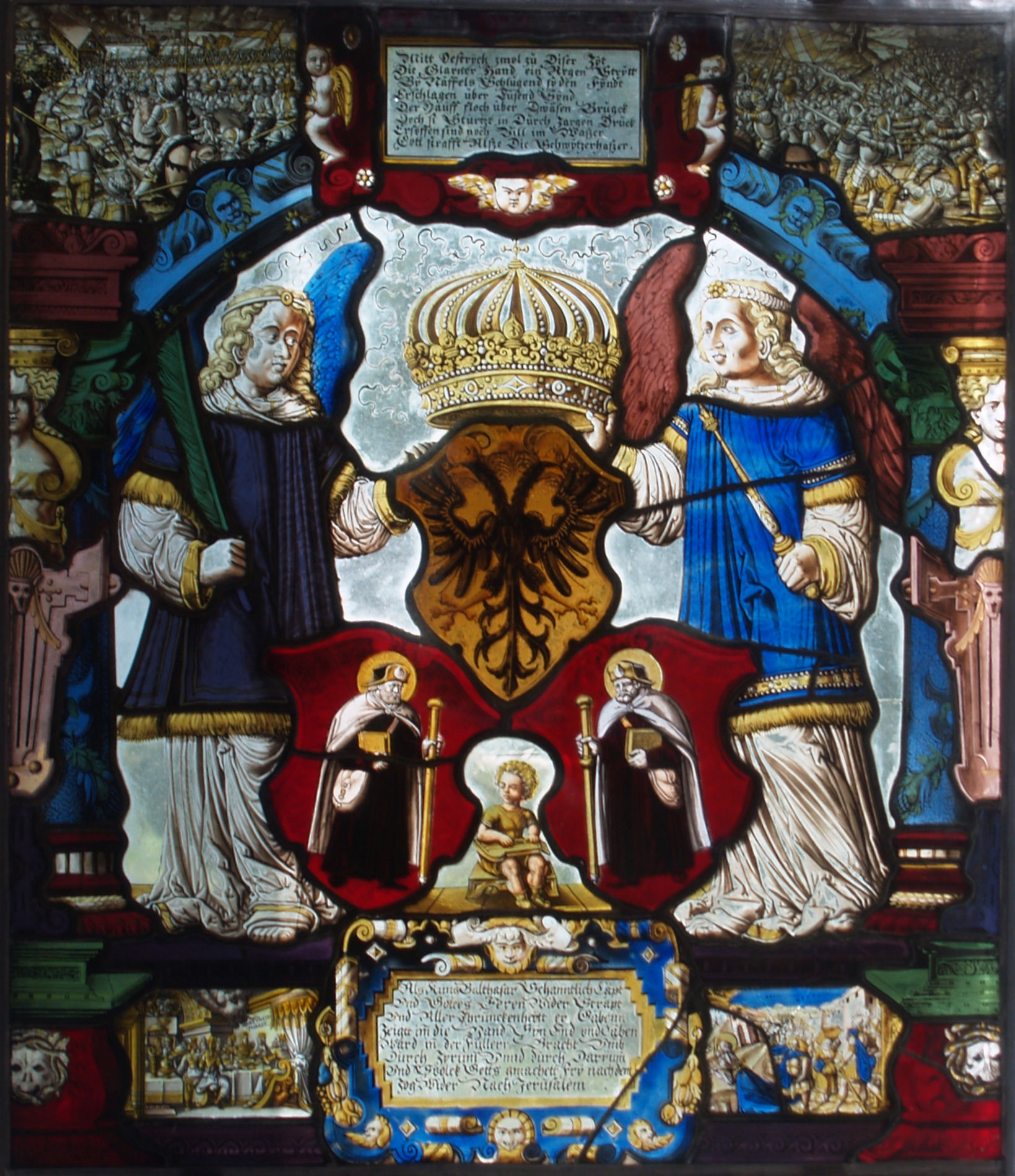
Glarus armorial stained-glass panel from the workshop of Jos and Christoph Murer at Wettingen Abbey (1579)

Murer produced numerous stained-glass panels with cantonal and heraldic designs. He also made figure panels, and some of his stained-glass works included inscriptions that he wrote himself. Murer was the first artist to make the Swiss wars of liberation a subject of stained glass, alongside themes from Roman history. His imagery drew on illustrations in contemporary chronicles. For monastic commissions, he also produced stained-glass panels with subjects relating to Christ and depictions of saints. His stained-glass works are characterised by the use of clear glass for skies and finely detailed drawing.

His monastic commissions included stained-glass panels for Wettingen Abbey in 1558, 1570 and 1579, and for Tänikon Abbey in 1559. He created a series of twenty stained-glass panels depicting standard-bearers for Zurich’s newly built Schützenhaus am Platz. Eighteen of the original twenty standard-bearer panels survive at Wörlitz. The panels for the thirteen cantons and St Gallen are dated 1572, while further panels followed in 1574 and 1575. Across the series, the standard-bearers are framed by ornamented columns or pilasters, while the surrounding landscapes include miniature scenes of battles, shooting festivals and city views.

A monogrammed 1574 design showing the Oath of the Three Confederates and episodes from early Swiss history has been attributed to Murer with a high degree of certainty. In 1579, Jos and Christoph Murer produced cantonal armorial stained-glass panels for the east arm of the cloister at Wettingen Abbey. In 1786, Johann Caspar Lavater arranged for the Schützenhaus panels to be sent to Prince Franz of Anhalt-Dessau in Wörlitz.

=== Writing ===
Murer wrote seven plays with moral themes, six of them based on biblical subjects. The plays appeared in print between 1556 and 1575 and were performed in Zurich and Winterthur. Several of Murer’s dramas were staged at the Fraumünsterhof in Zurich. His dramatic works reflect the tradition of Reformation theatre and generally draw closely on biblical wording.

While Naboth (1556) closely followed the biblical story of Naboth in 1 Kings 21, Murer's later plays adapted their sources more freely and sometimes drew on earlier plays. Despite drawing on works by Georg Binder and Hans Salat, Der jungen Mannen Spiegel is largely independent and is linked to the parable of the Prodigal Son mainly through its central theme. In 1565, Absalom was performed on Münsterplatz in Zurich for the wedding of the city’s mayor.

Some of Murer's plays were accompanied by woodcut title illustrations attributed to him. His surviving poetry includes a 1575 memorial poem for the theologian Heinrich Bullinger.

=== Cartography ===
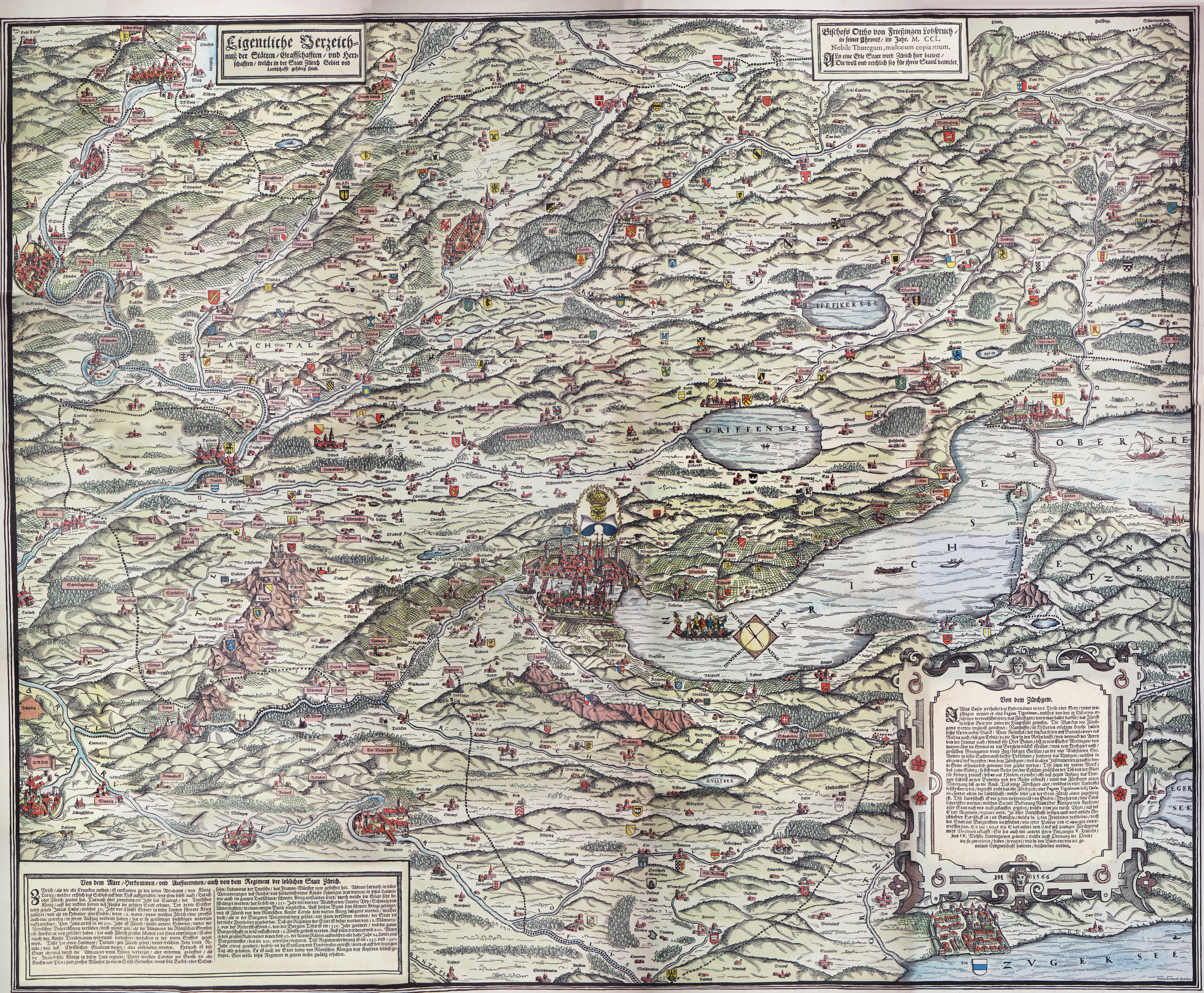
Map of the Zurich territory (1566)

In 1566, a map designed by Murer became the first printed map of the Zurich territory. The woodcut map measures 124 by 105 centimetres and has an approximate scale of 1:56,000. Only a copy of the 1568 reprint survives. A fourth edition of the map was printed from the original woodblocks in the early 18th century.

Murer completed an oil-painted view of the city in 1574, but the work has since been lost. A woodcut version was published in 1576 and subsequently appeared in numerous editions. The plan was printed from seven woodblocks: six showed the city within its walls and the surrounding area, while a seventh was devoted to the Grossmünster. It is approximately 132 by 90 centimetres in size. The original woodblocks are preserved in the Zurich State Archives. It was the first city plan to show Zurich from a bird’s-eye perspective.

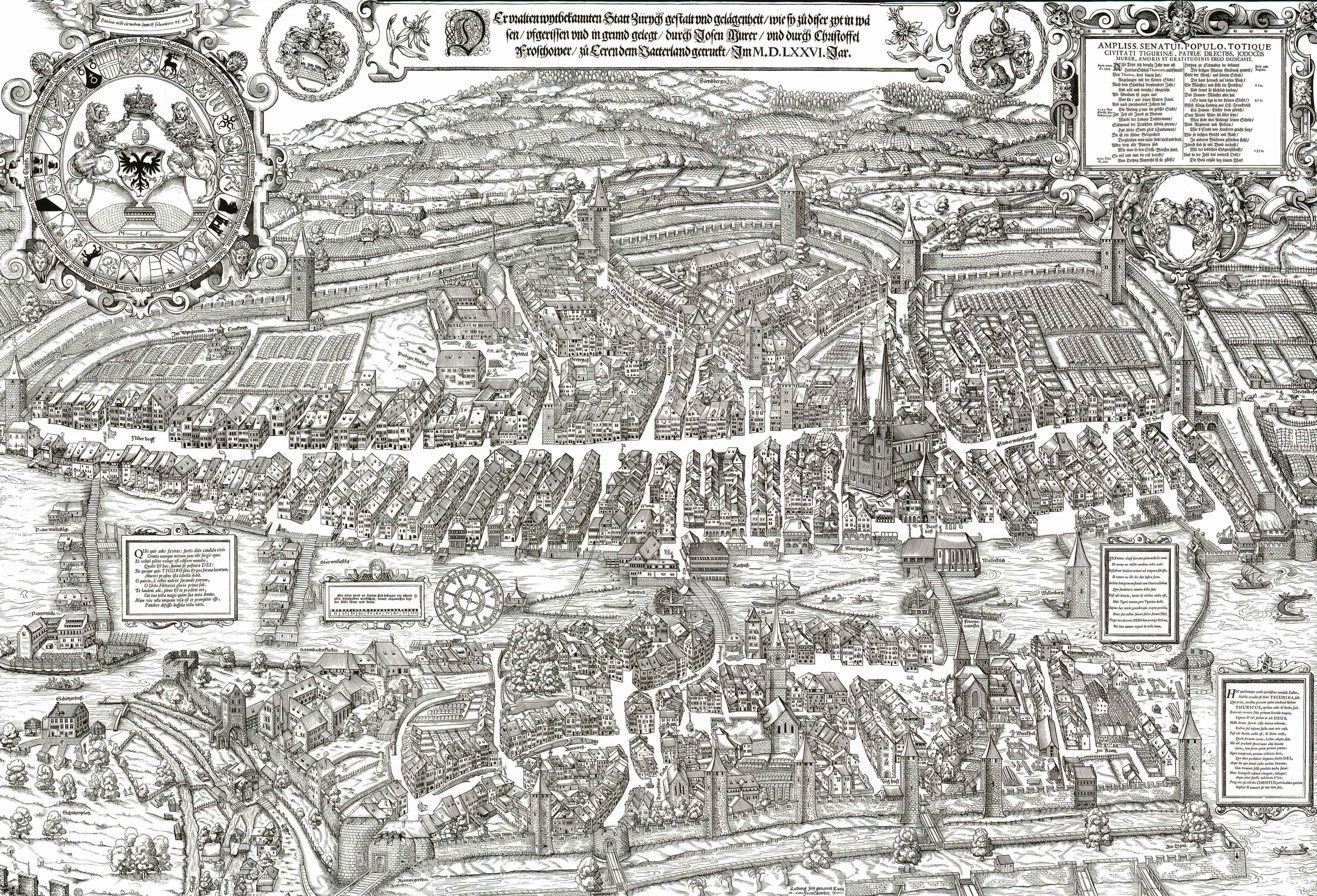
The Murerplan (1576)

Known as the Murerplan, the city plan included scenes of everyday life, such as women carrying laundry, livestock in public squares and activity along the Limmat. The plan presents an interpretive view of the city, with prominent buildings such as the Grossmünster and the city fortifications shown at an exaggerated scale. Undeveloped land is also shown both within and beyond the city walls. It also depicts technical features of 16th-century Zurich, including water wheels used to raise water from the Limmat and fish traps used by local fishermen. One detail shows a rope system used to send crossbow bolts back across the Limmat to the shooters.

Publication of the plan also raised military concerns because its depiction of Zurich’s fortifications could have revealed their strengths and weaknesses to an enemy. Copies of the plan are displayed in private and public spaces across Zurich, and the plan continues to be consulted when determining the original appearance of historic buildings and streets.

== Collections ==
Works by Murer are held in collections including the Aargau Cantonal Library, Erlangen University Library, the ETH Zurich Graphics Collection and the Swiss National Museum. His cartographic works are among the historical maps held by the Zurich State Archives, whose map and plan collection has been fully digitised and made available online. His stained-glass works are also preserved at Wettingen Abbey, Tänikon Abbey and the Gothic House in Wörlitz.

== Gallery ==
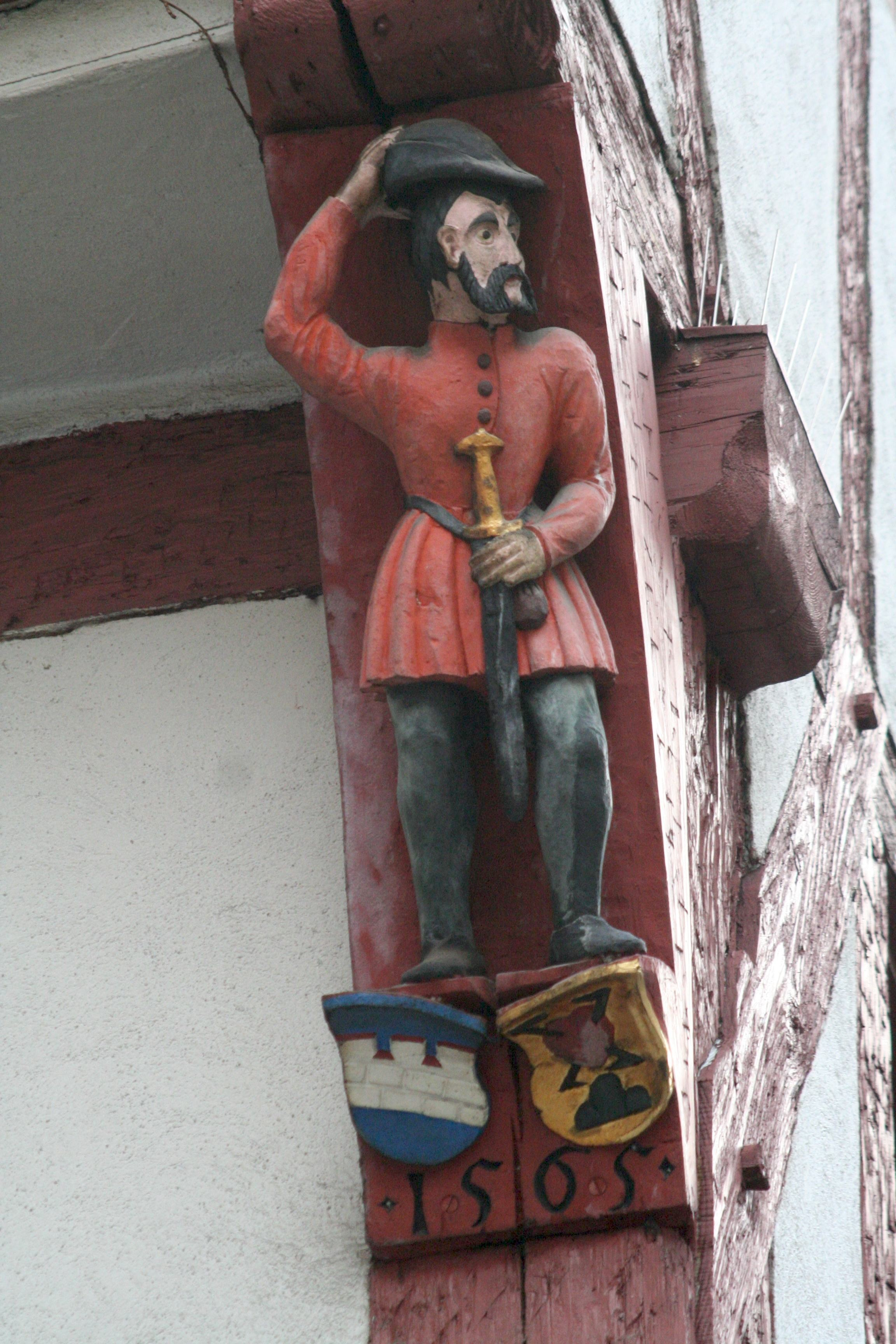
Figure above the Murer and Schön coats of arms on Murer’s house in Nägelihof, Zurich (1565)

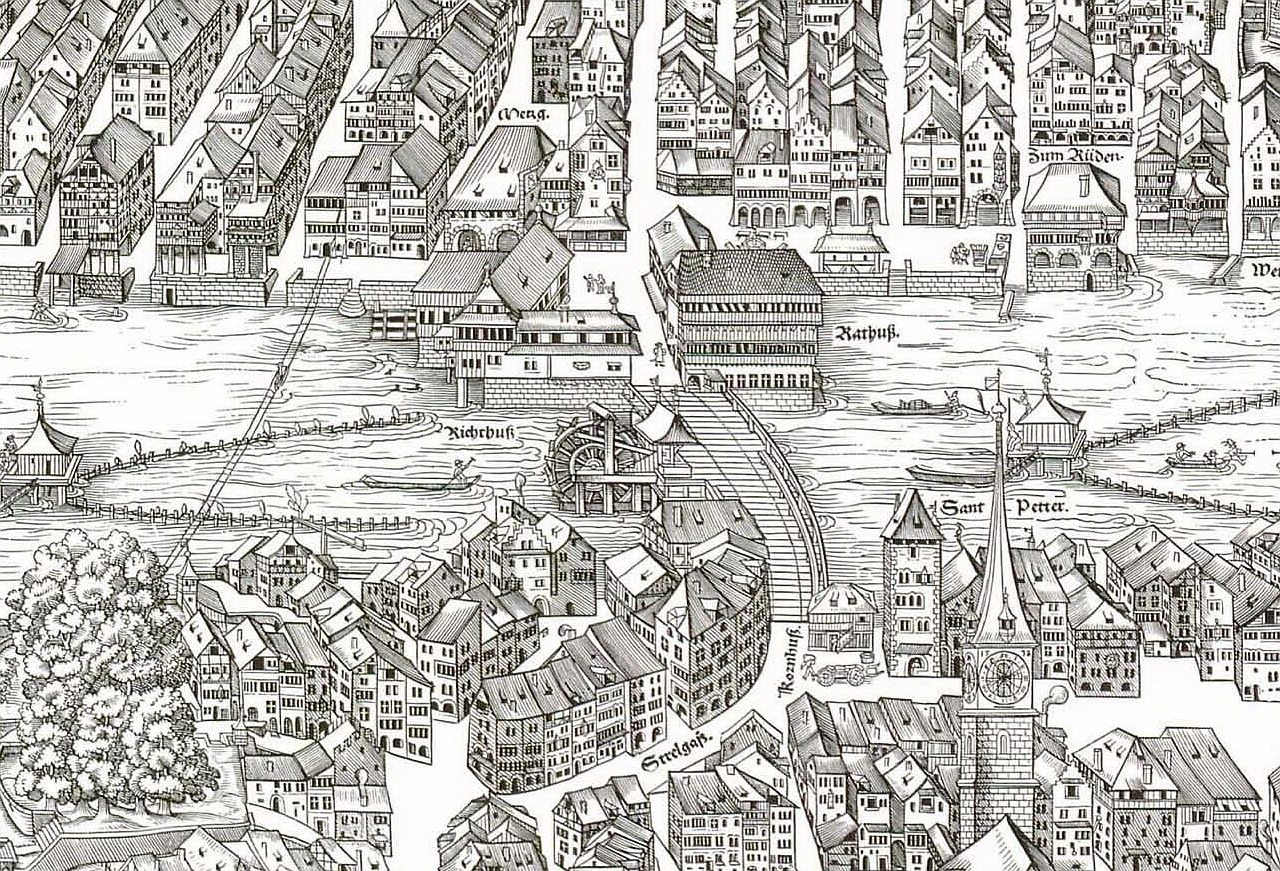
Rathausbrücke, the Rathaus and surrounding buildings on the Murerplan (1576)

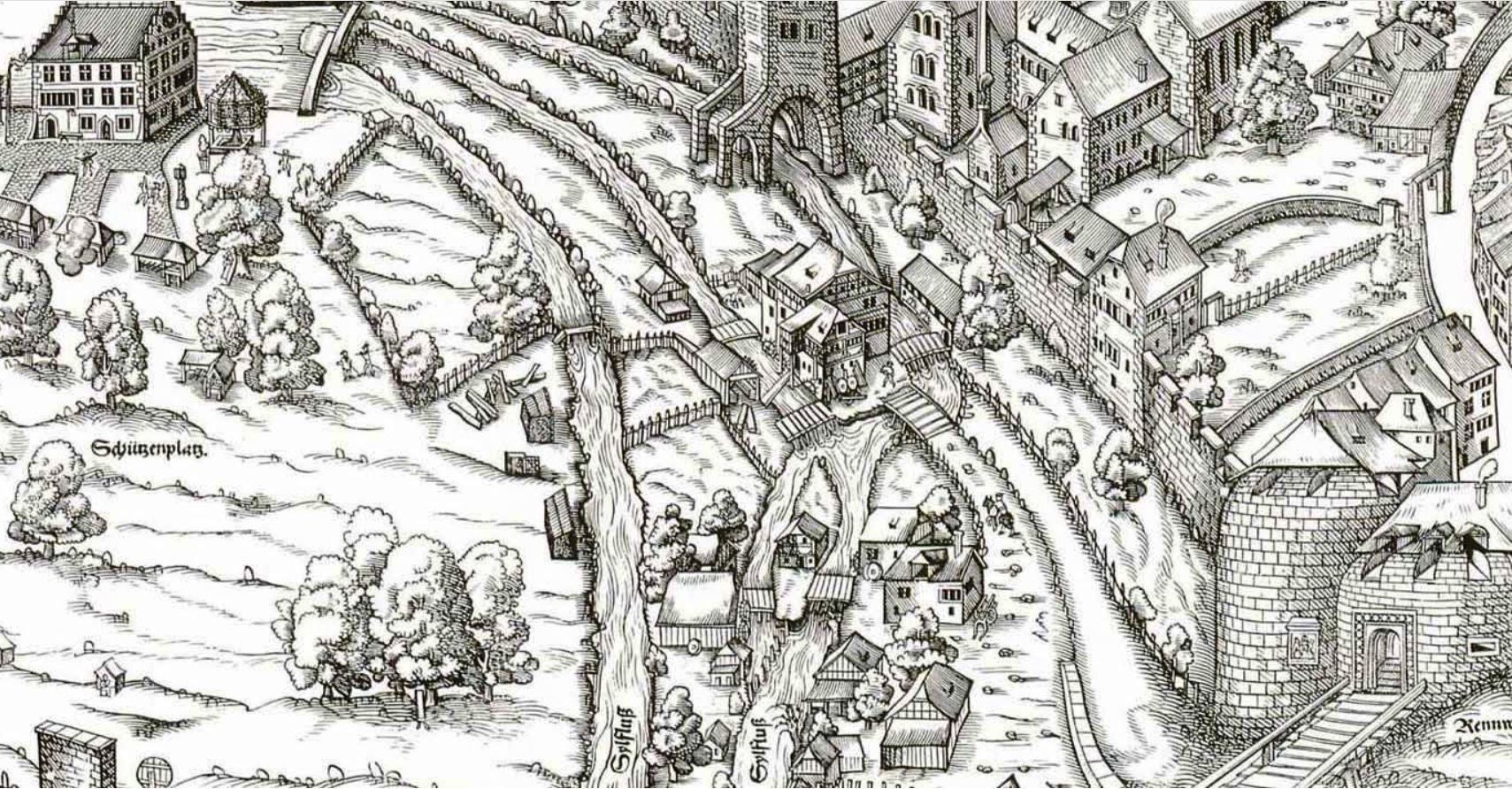
Sihl channels and Werdmühlen on the Murerplan (1576)
