= Johann Jakob Breitinger (Antistes) =

Swiss reformed pastor in Zürich

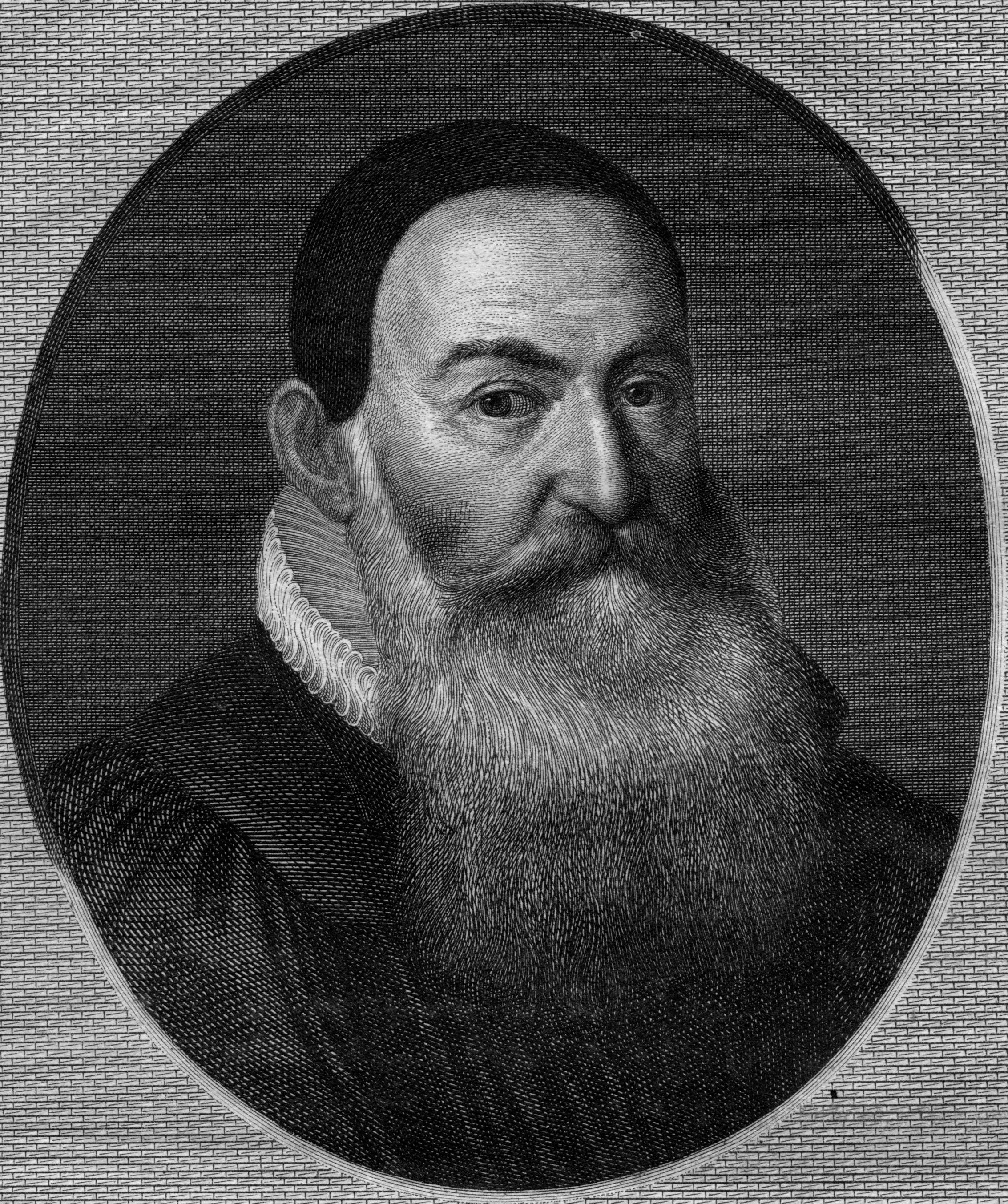
Johann Jakob Breitinger

Johann Jakob Breitinger (19 April 1575 in Zürich - 1 April 1645) was a Reformed pastor in Zürich, professor, antistes and politician.

Johann Jakob Breitinger studied in Herborn, Marburg, Franeker, Leiden, Heidelberg und Basel. He was a pastor in Zumikon, Albisrieden and then Professor of Logic and Rhetoric at the Collegium Humanitatis. Afterwards pastor to St. Peter, the Grosse Rat (parliament of the city) elected him in 1613 to pastor at the Grossmünster and thus to the Antistes of the Zürich Church. As the sixth successor to Zwingli in the leadership of the Zürich Church, he introduced a day of prayer and was known for his sermons, in which he reprimanded foreign military service, bribery, buying offices and national debt. He demanded the improvement of discipline and custom among the people and a ban on the theater. He promoted elementary school, Sunday children's teaching and church singing in town and country and campaigned for poor relief and welfare. On behalf of the authorities, he carried out the first census of the Zürich area after the Reformation in 1634.

Theologically, he strictly represented the doctrine of predestination and the Second Helvetic Confession. After the initially negative attitude of the clergy, Breitinger was sent to the Dordrecht Synod (1618–19) as a delegate representing Zürich, following the intercession of the Dutch diplomat Peter von Brederode and his support by Professor Caspar Waser. There he took a stand against the remonstrants. Johann Heinrich Waser, the professor's son, accompanied him as his secretary.

During the Thirty Years' War, the Antistes represented the Swedish side in Zürich and collected 35,000 guilders to alleviate the war needs in the Holy Roman Empire. He saw in the Catholic towns and the counter-reformation Habsburg Austria a danger for the reformed Zürich and advocated the modernization of the defense system and the construction of a new, third city fortification.

== Literature ==
- Friedrich Wilhelm Bautz (1975). "Breitinger, Johann Jakob". In Bautz, Friedrich Wilhelm (ed.). Biographisch-Bibliographisches Kirchenlexikon (BBKL) (in German). Vol. 1. Hamm: Bautz. col. 740. ISBN 3-88309-013-1.
- Leonhard Haas (1955). "Breitinger, Johann Jakob". Neue Deutsche Biographie (in German). Vol. 2. Berlin: Duncker & Humblot. pp. 577–578. (full text online).
- Sundar Henny: "Schriftreliquien und Kopien: Johann Jakob Breitinger (1575–1645)". In: ders.: Vom Leib geschrieben. Der Mikrokosmos Zürich und seine Selbstzeugnisse im 17. Jahrhundert, Böhlau, Köln 2016, ISBN 978-3-412-50289-8, S. 73–118 (open access)
- "Johann Jakob Breitinger" in German, French and Italian in the online Historical Dictionary of Switzerland.
- Johann Kaspar Mörikofer (1876). "Breitinger, Johann Jakob" . Allgemeine Deutsche Biographie (in German). Vol. 3. Leipzig: Duncker & Humblot. pp. 294–295.
- Andreas Kotte, ed. (2005). "Johann Jakob Breitinger". Theaterlexikon der Schweiz / Dictionnaire du théâtre en Suisse / Dizionario Teatrale Svizzero / Lexicon da teater svizzer [Theater Dictionary of Switzerland]. Vol. 1. Zürich: Chronos. pp. 267–268. ISBN 978-3-0340-0715-3. LCCN 2007423414. OCLC 62309181.
