= Murerplan =

1576 map of Zürich

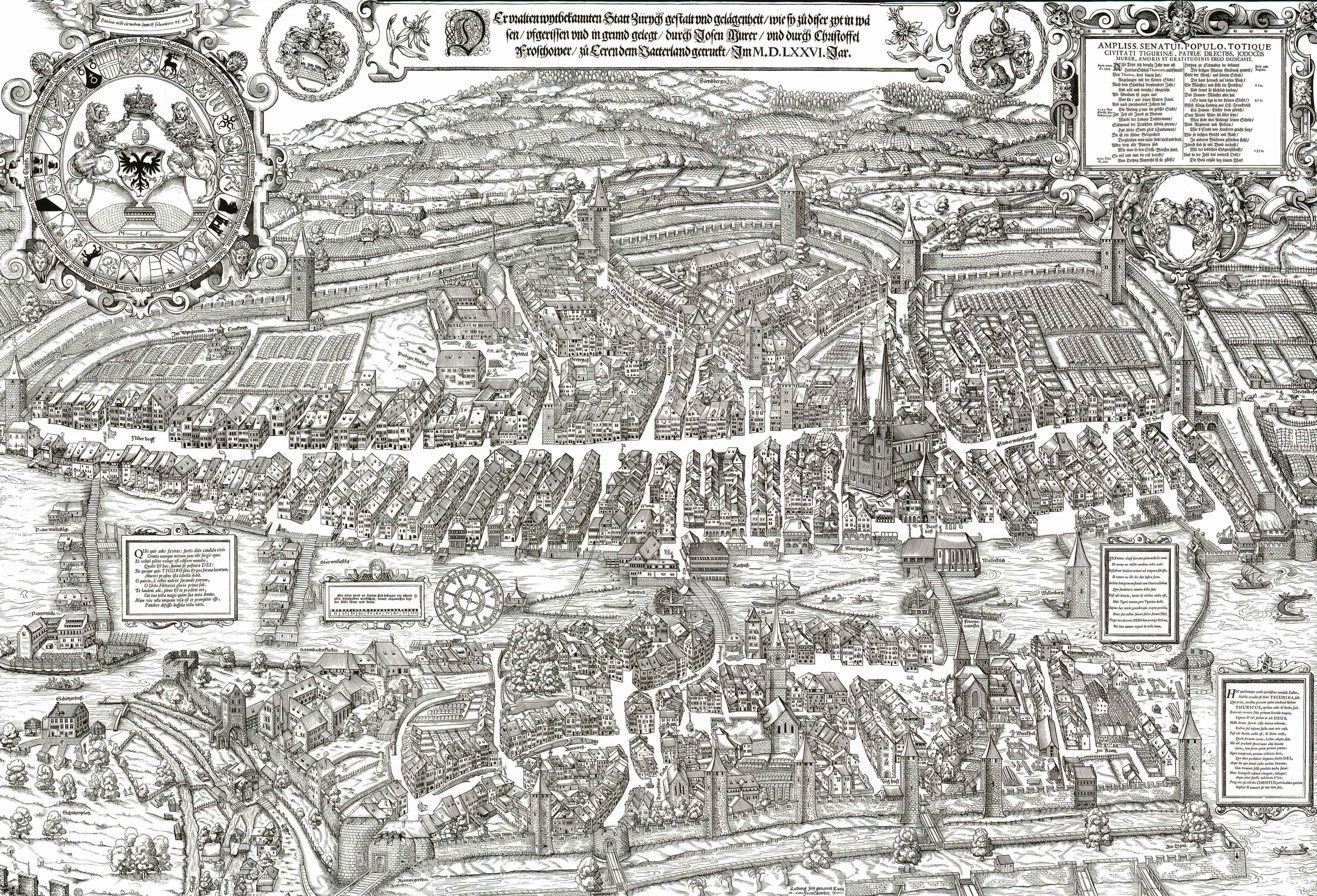
The Murerplan

The Murerplan is a historic map of Zürich, printed in 1576 by Jos Murer (1530–1580). It was combined from six pearwood plates measuring 45 cm squared each. A smaller extra plate was made for the Grossmünster, which would otherwise have been divided between four plates. The original plates have not been preserved. The plates of a second edition of 1610 survive.

== Description ==
The map is entitled

Der uralten wytbekannten Statt Zurych gestalt und gelaegenhait / wie sy zuo diser zyt in waesen / ufgerissen und in grund gelegt / durch Josen Murer / und durch Christoffel Froschaower / zuo Eeren dem Vatterland getruckt / Im M.D.LXXVI. Jar.
"The aspect and situation of the ancient and famous town of Zürich / as it has been at this time / drawn and etched / by Jos Murer / and by Christoph Froschauer / printed for the glory of the nation / AD 1576"

The plan is extremely detailed, showing the aspect of every house, and is a unique historical source for the condition of the city in the 16th century. Zürich had essentially preserved its medieval (13th-century) aspect until that time (except for the frequent replacement of earlier wooden buildings by stone houses), and major expansions and city planning began only in the 17th century, with the addition of ramparts during the Thirty Years' War.

The plan looks east over the city (north to the left), with the moat at the bottom of the plan corresponding to the present Bahnhofstrasse, with the Rennweg gate, the main entry to the city. The bottom left corner shows the confluence of the Sihl and Limmat rivers, the location of the present Zürich Hauptbahnhof.

== Gallery ==
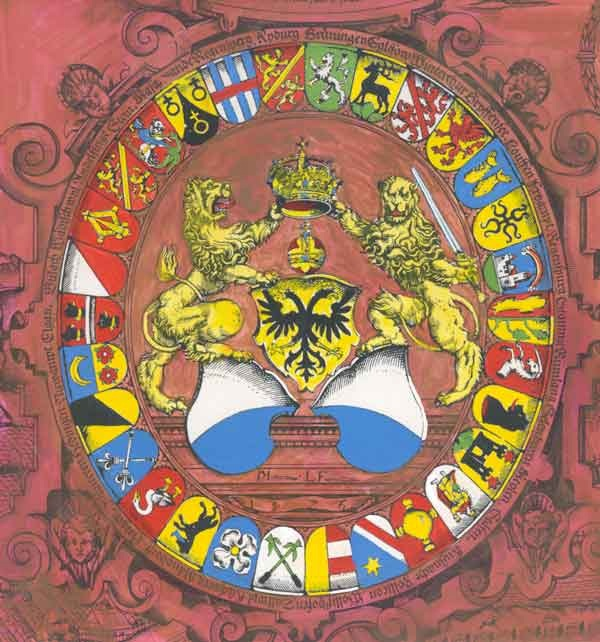
Detail: coat of arms of Zürich (colours added)

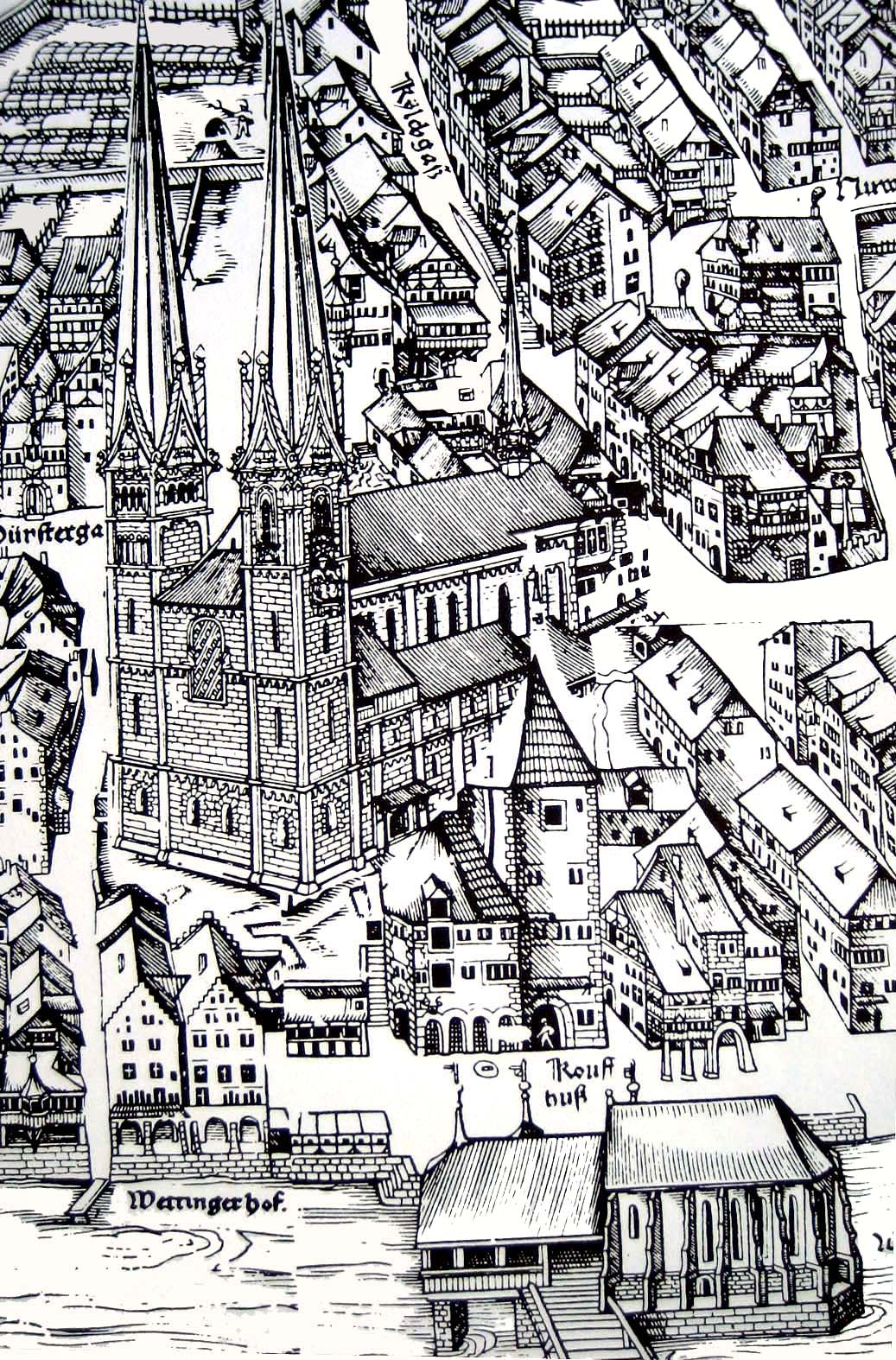
Detail: Grossmünster

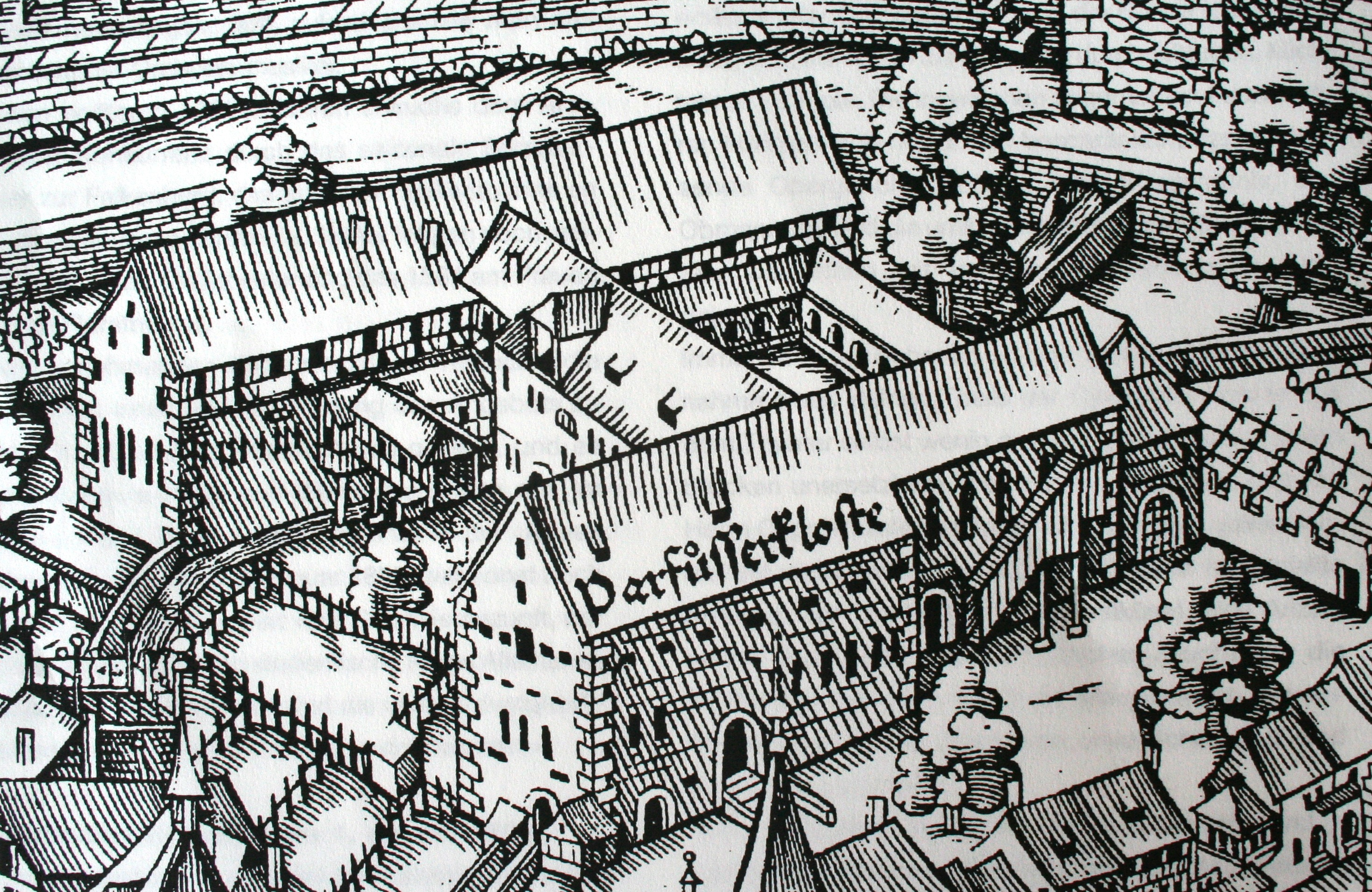
Detail: Barfüsser Abbey in Zürich

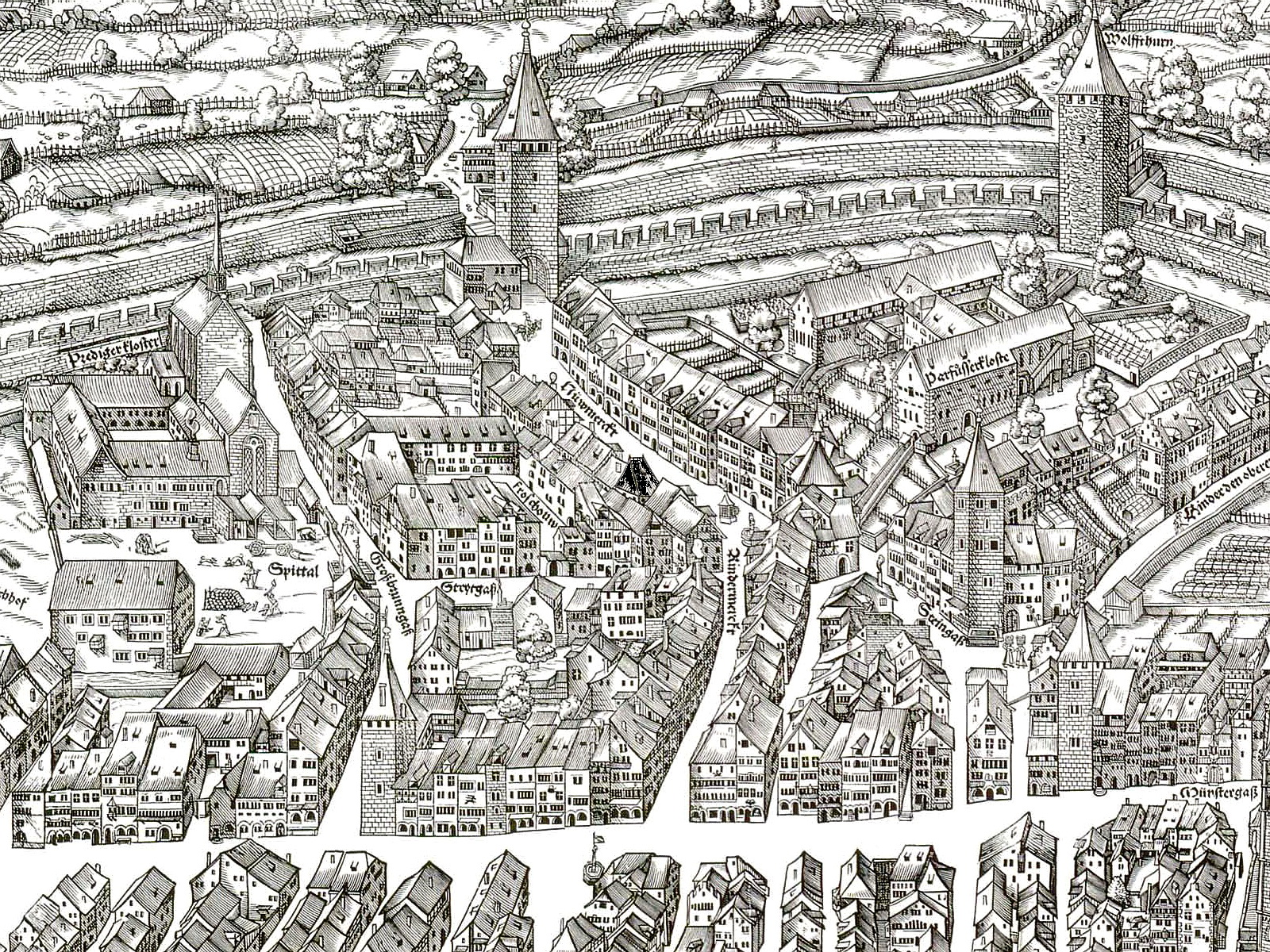
Detail: Neumarkt and Grimmenturm

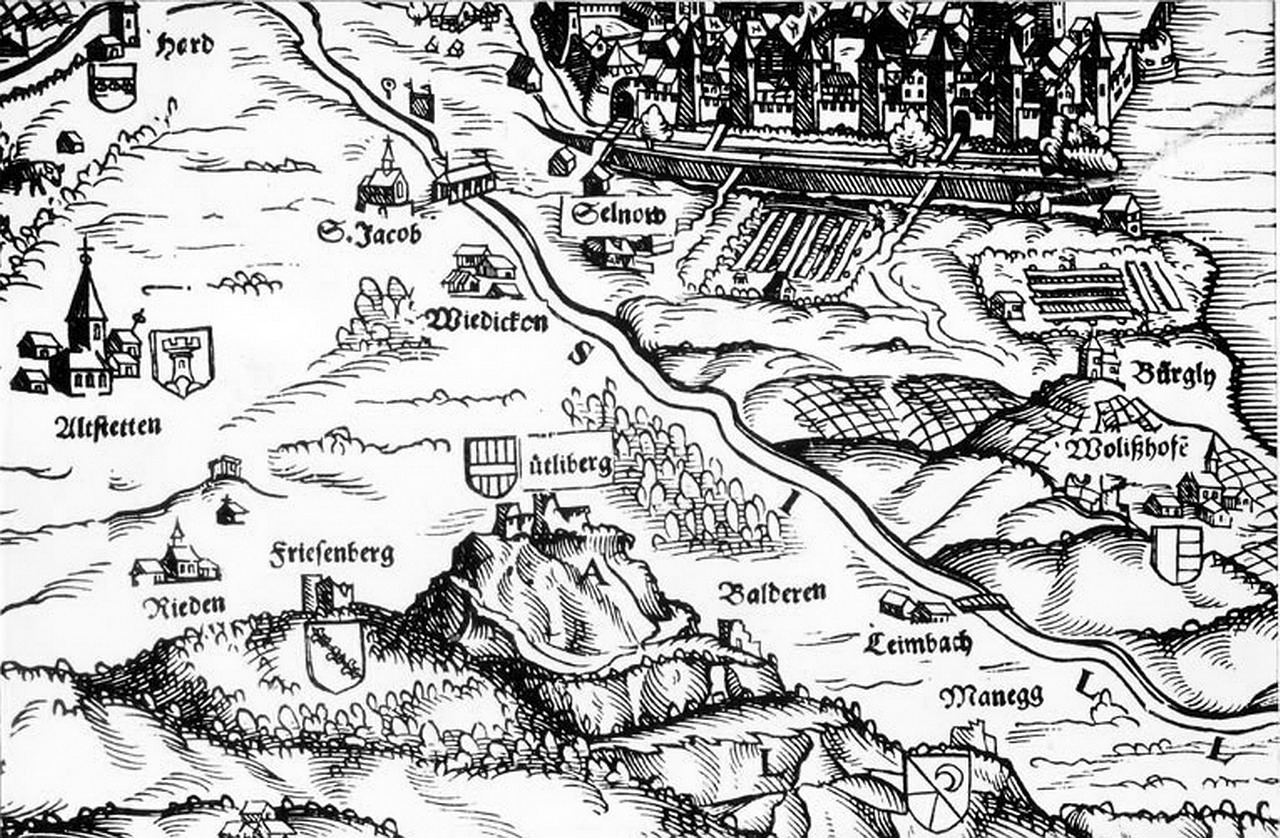
Western and southern areas around the city of Zürich on the so-called Kantonskarte (Zürcherkarte) by Jos Murer (1566)

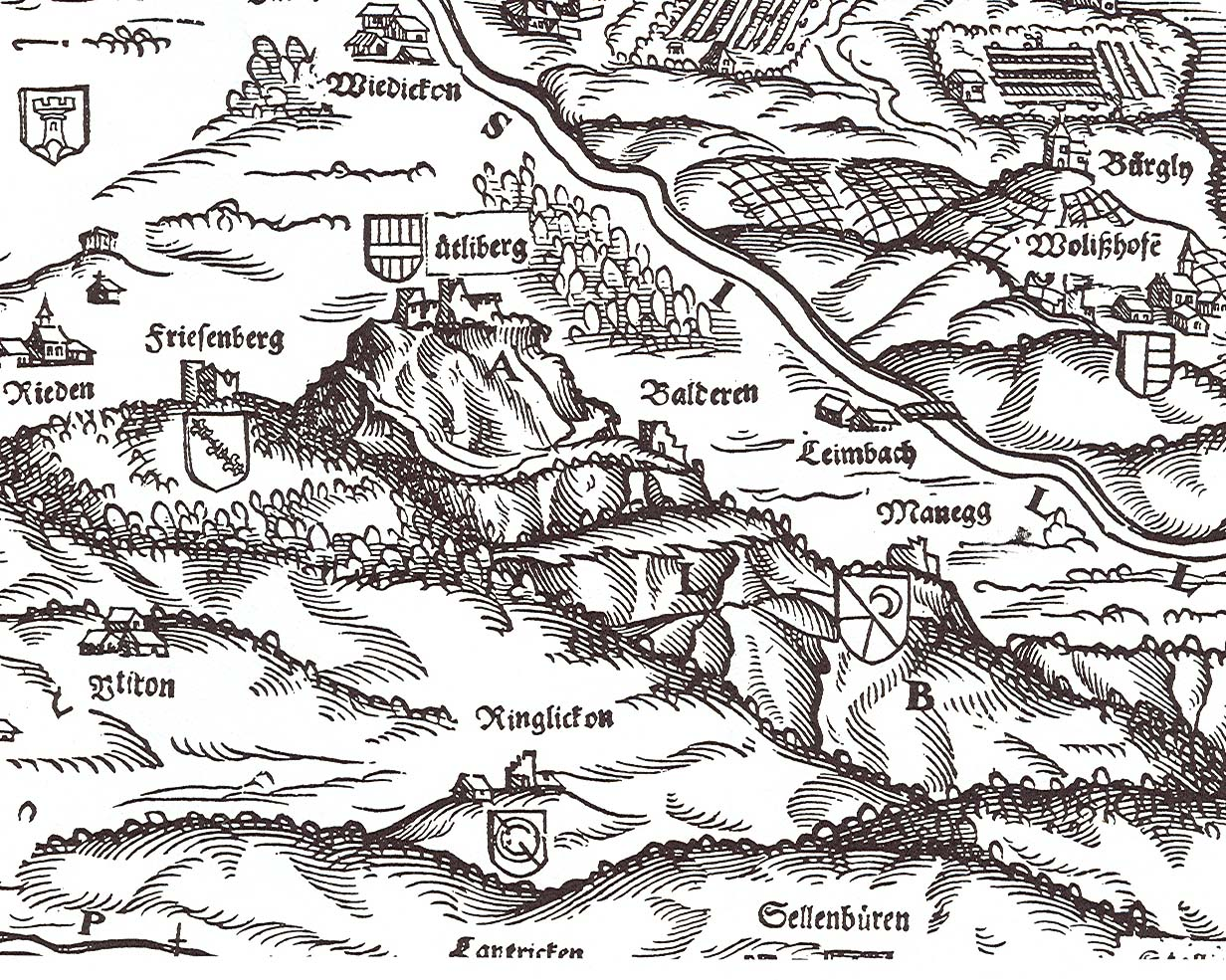
Detail: Uetliberg and Albis showing the castles called Uetliburg, Friesenburg, Baldern and Manegg

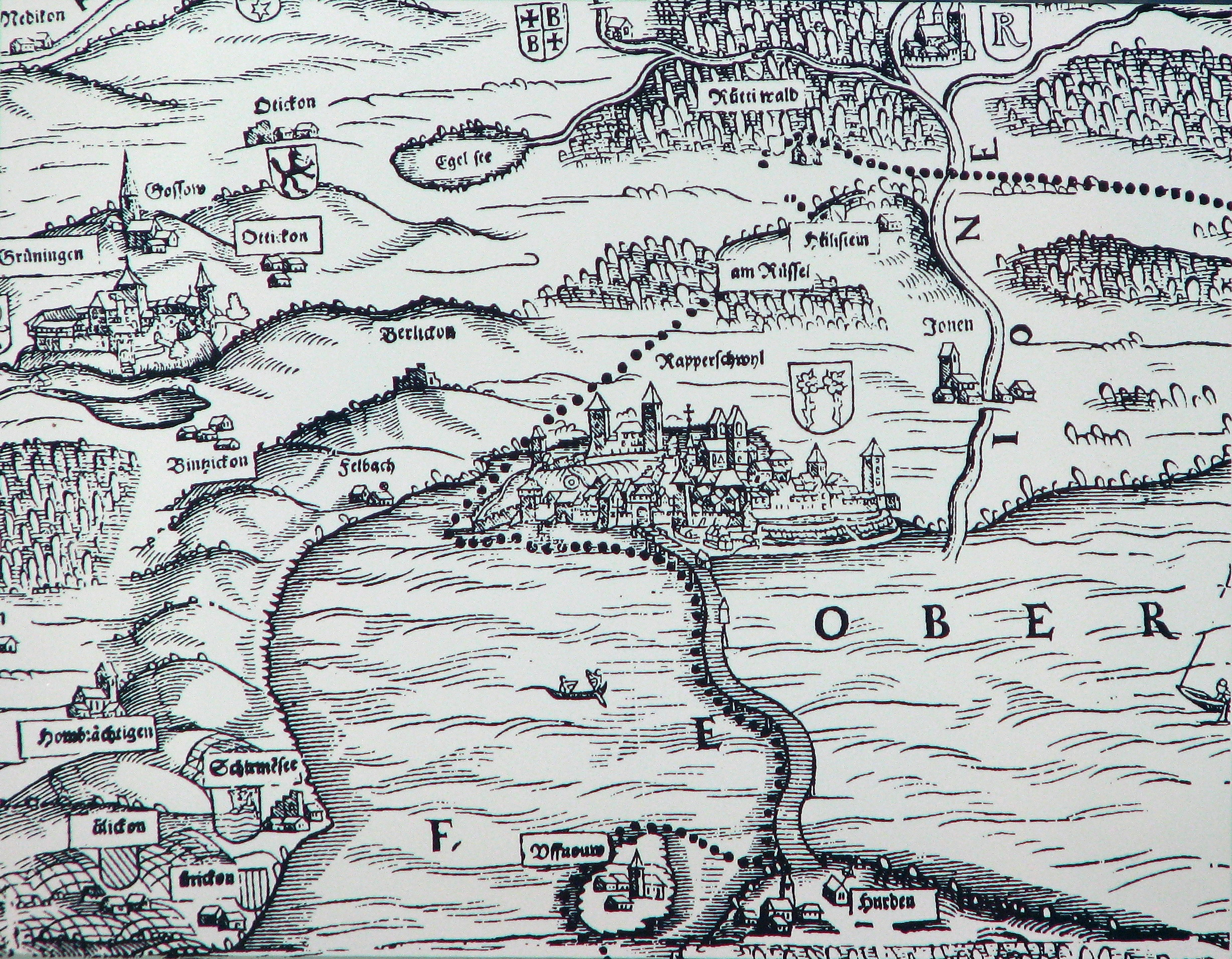
Rapperswil, Seedamm respectively wooden bridge, upper Lake Zürich (Obersee) and Jona river (Jonen) on Kantonskarte

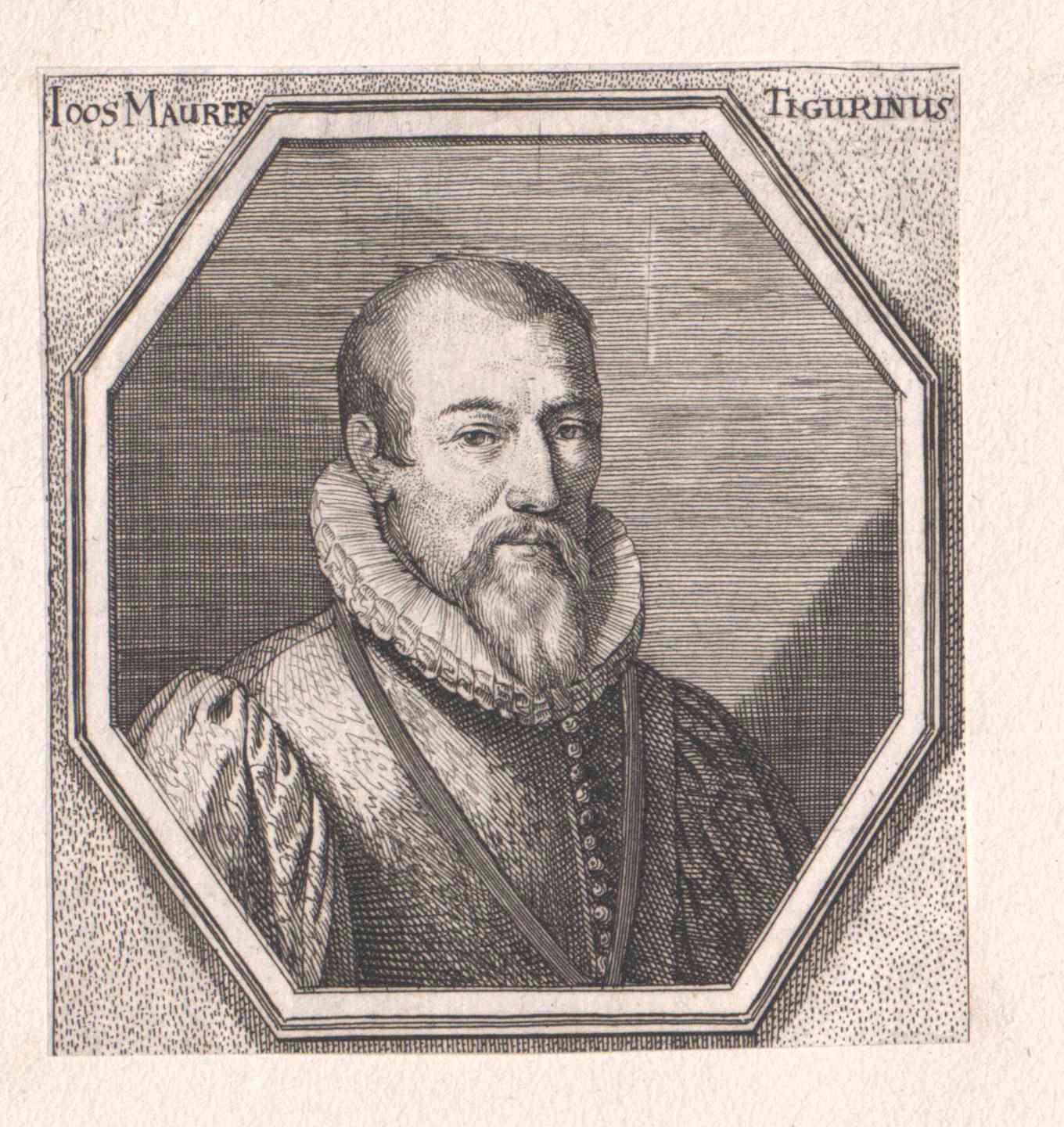
Jos Murer, by Conrad Meyer (1675)
