= Hans Caspar Waser =

Swiss clergyman (1612–1677)

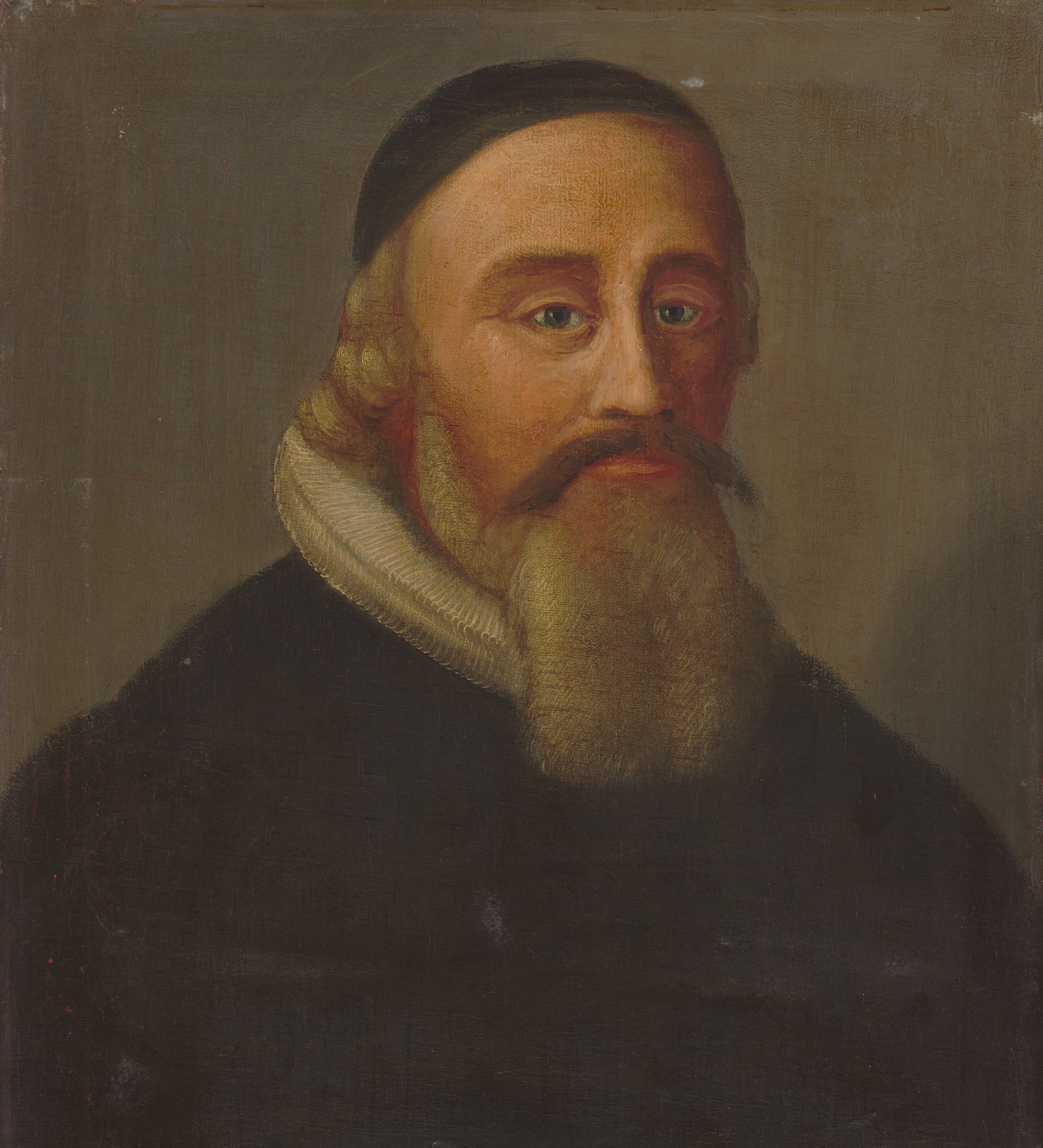
- Portrait by Conrad Meyer
- Born: 9 December 1612; Zurich, Old Swiss Confederacy
- Died: November 1677 (aged 64); Zurich, Old Swiss Confederacy
- Occupation: Pastor
- Spouses: Regula Holzhalb; Esther Orell

Hans Caspar Waser (9 December 1612 – November 1677) was a pastor from Zurich. In 1668, against his will, he became Antistes (head) of the Zurich church. The Formula Consensus was issued in 1675, during his term of office.

== Biography ==
Hans Caspar Waser was the son of Caspar and a grandson of Josias Simler, and a brother of Johann Heinrich and Josias. He married first Regula Holzhalb, and second Esther Orell, widow of Rudolf Teuscher.

He studied in Lausanne, Saumur and Paris. In 1633 he was ordained and was pastor in Zumikon for four months. From 1633 to 1636 he was a teacher at the Fraumünster school, pastor in Wipkingen and supervisor of the candidates for the ministry (Exspektanten). In 1636 he became pastor in Rümlang, in 1655 archdeacon at the Grossmünster, and in 1662 provost (Propst) and administrator of the chapter there. In 1668, against his will, he became Antistes. As pastor of Rümlang, Waser introduced church singing. The Formula Consensus was issued in 1675, during his term as Antistes.

== Bibliography ==
- G. R. Zimmermann, Die Zürcher Kirche von der Reformation bis zum dritten Reformationsjubiläum (1519–1819) nach der Reihenfolge der Zürcherischen Antistes geschildert, 1878
