= Caspar Waser =

Swiss theologian (1565–1625)

- Engraving published by Conrad Meyer, Zurich, 1679
- Born: 1 September 1565; Zurich, Old Swiss Confederacy
- Died: 9 September 1625 (aged 60); Zurich, Old Swiss Confederacy
- Occupations: Theologian; pastor; professor
- Spouse: Dorothea Simler
- Children: Josias Waser; Johann Heinrich Waser; Hans Caspar Waser

Caspar Waser (1 September 1565 – 9 September 1625) was a theologian from Zurich. He was a pastor and professor there, from 1611 professor of theology at the Collegium Carolinum, and wrote grammars of Hebrew, Chaldean and Syriac. In 1618 he persuaded the Zurich clergy to take part in the Synod of Dort.

== Biography ==
Caspar Waser was the son of Hans, a surgeon, and Margaretha Wirz. He married Dorothea Simler, daughter of Josias Simler. He was the father of Johann Heinrich, mayor of Zurich, and of Hans Caspar and Josias.

Waser studied languages, natural sciences and mathematics as well as theology at the universities of Altdorf near Nuremberg (1584) and Heidelberg (1585), at the Academy of Geneva (1584–1585), at the University of Basel (1586–1587), in Siena (1590) and at the University of Leiden (1591). From 1586 to 1593 he was also tutor (Hofmeister) to the patrician Johann Peter Heinzel. In 1593 he took his theological examination, was ordained in Zurich and became pastor in Witikon. In 1596 he became deacon at the Grossmünster, in 1598 professor of Hebrew, around 1607 canon and professor of Greek, and in 1611 professor of theology at the Collegium Carolinum.

Among other causes, Waser was a leading advocate of the Baden alliance of 1612, a defensive alliance between Zurich, Bern and Margrave George Frederick of Baden-Durlach. He defended Zurich's mercenary alliance (Soldbündnis) with France with a view to protecting Geneva, and he supported an alliance with Venice directed against Habsburg Spain. In 1618 he persuaded the Zurich clergy, who had refused for theological reasons to take part in the Synod of Dort, to change their position.

Waser also kept up an extensive correspondence. He wrote theological and historical works and grammars of Hebrew, Chaldean and Syriac, translated mathematical writings by Leonhard Zubler, and in 1610 published an annotated new edition of Conrad Gessner's Mithridates.

== Bibliography ==
- Allgemeine Deutsche Biographie, 41, 227–228
- T. Schieder, "Briefliche Quellen zur politischen Geistesgeschichte Westpreussens", in Altpreussische Forschungen, 18, 1941, 261–275
- R. Seidel, Späthumanismus in Schlesien, 1994, especially 108–114

=== Archives ===
- Papers (Nachlass), Zentralbibliothek Zürich
