= Josias Waser =

Swiss pastor (1598–1629)

- Born: 14 July 1598; Zurich, Old Swiss Confederacy
- Died: November 1629 (aged 31); Zurich, Old Swiss Confederacy
- Occupation: Pastor
- Spouse: Margareta Keller (m. 1624)

Josias Waser (14 July 1598 – November 1629) was a pastor from Zurich. In 1620 he went with the Zurich troops as a preacher on the campaign to the Valtellina and wrote an account of his experiences. He assembled a collection of pamphlets from about 1610 to 1624.

== Biography ==
Josias Waser was the son of Caspar and a grandson of Josias Simler, and a brother of Hans Caspar and Johann Heinrich. In 1624 he married Margareta Keller, daughter of Hans Konrad, a member of the Twelve (Zwölfer) of the guild zum Weggen and administrator (Amtmann) in Rüti.

He studied theology in Basel in 1614 and in Heidelberg in 1615, and was ordained the same year. From 1617 he was pastor in Wipkingen. In 1620 he took part as a preacher in the campaign of the Zurich troops to the Valtellina. In 1623 he became pastor at the Predigerkirche in Zurich. He wrote an account of his experiences on the Valtellina campaign, a Kurtze und wahrhaffte Beschreibung ("short and true description"), which is in the Zentralbibliothek Zürich. The collection of pamphlets (Flugschriften) that he assembled, in 12 volumes from about 1610 to 1624, includes poems in his own hand (1619) in praise of the Winter King, Frederick V of the Palatinate.

== Bibliography ==
- Die Matrikel der Universität Basel, 3, 160
- U. B. Leu, "Nuhu trit herfur o pfaltzischer Lew", in Gutenberg-Jahrbuch, 84, 2009, 289–306
