= Rathausbrücke =

Rathaus (German for "town hall bridge", may refer to the following structure:

- Rathausbrücke, Berlin, a bridge crossing the river Spree in Berlin, Germany
- Rathausbrücke, Erfurt, a bridge crossing a branch of the river Gera in Erfurt, Germany
- Rathausbrücke, Zurich, a pedestrian bridge crossing the river Limmat in Zurich, Switzerland
