= Waser family =

Bourgeois family of Zurich

The Waser family is a widely branched bourgeois family of Zurich, whose origins are unclear and whose genealogy has some uncertainties. It reached its political peak in the 17th century, with ten members of the Small Council and the mayor Johann Heinrich Waser. The Wasers were also among the most important milling families of northeastern Switzerland.

== History ==
The first bearers of the name are mentioned in Zurich in 1358. Other Wasers, who had moved there from Bonstetten and Wiedikon among other places, were admitted as citizens of Zurich in 1401, 1402 and 1440. Johannes, guild master (Zunftmeister) of the guild zur Schiffleuten in 1489 and bailiff (Landvogt) of Kyburg in 1498, is regarded as the progenitor of the family.

His grandson Itelhans (died 1531) founded the Dinhard branch. Johans (1628–1710) was pastor in Dinhard and was married to Cleophea Schweizer, a miller's daughter. Their descendants took over mills in Dinhard, Ossingen, Stammheim, Neunforn and Altstetten. Like the Wiser family of Uhwiesen and the Wehrli family of Stammheim, who were also citizens of the city, the Wasers were among the most important milling families of northeastern Switzerland. The miller Hans Jakob (1779–1838) sold his mill in Dinhard and moved back to Zurich. In 1845 his son Johann Heinrich (1820–1871) opened a bookbindery in the house zum Türken on the Limmatquai. He later expanded the firm, Johann Heinrich Waser & Co., with a stationery business and a wholesale paper trade. The wholesale trade was separated from the retail business in 1891.

The Wasers reached their political peak in the 17th century, with ten members of the Small Council and with the mayor Johann Heinrich. Up to the end of the 18th century they provided 19 members of the Small Council and 52 members of the Grand Council in all. The seat (Schild) in the society of the Schildner zum Schneggen that Johann Heinrich had acquired remained with the family until 1843. The Wasers intermarried mainly with the Rahn, Steiner von Uitikon and Lochmann families, Junker families in French service. The successful family also produced a number of well-known scholars and clergymen.

== Bibliography ==
- W. Hofmeister, Genealogische Tabellen der Stadtbürgerschaft, 1780–1814 (Stadtarchiv Zürich)
- Schweizerisches Geschlechterbuch, 2, 586–593; 6, 752–763
- M. Waser, Vom Zürcher Geschlecht der Waseren, 1941
