= Johann Heinrich Waser (statistician) =

Swiss statistician (1742–1780)

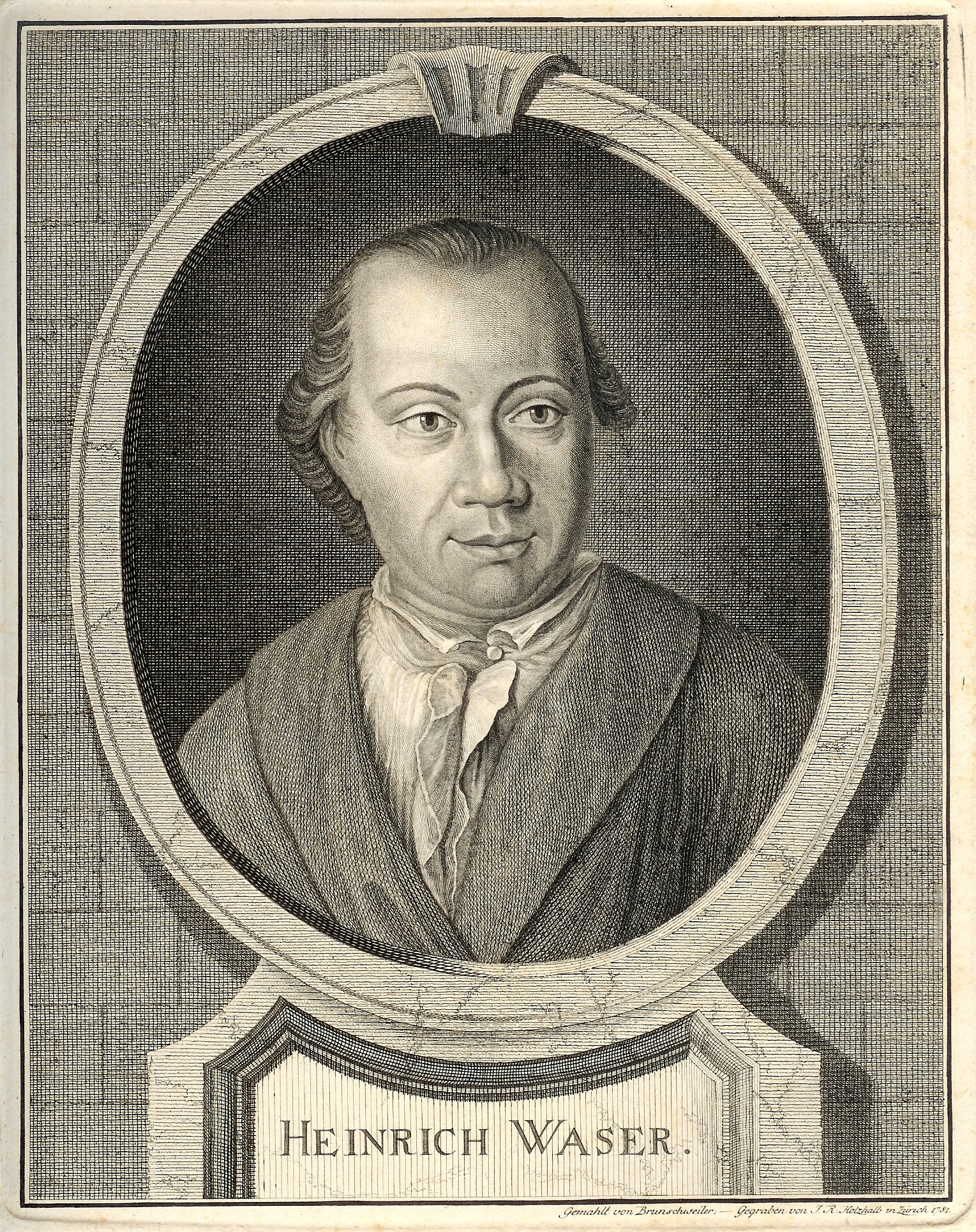
- Engraving by Johann Rudolf Holzhalb, 1781
- Born: 1 April 1742; Zurich, Old Swiss Confederacy
- Died: 27 May 1780 (aged 38); Zurich, Old Swiss Confederacy
- Occupations: Pastor; statistician
- Spouse: Anna Cleophea Scheuchzer (m. 1765)

Johann Heinrich Waser (1 April 1742 – 27 May 1780) was a pastor and statistician from Zurich. After his suspension as a pastor in 1774 he pursued statistical and economic studies. In 1780, after he had criticized the administration of the Zurich war fund in a German journal, he was sentenced to death and beheaded. He was a pioneer of statistics and economics.

== Biography ==
Johann Heinrich Waser was the son of Heinrich, a baker, and Anna Häfeli. In 1765 he married Anna Cleophea Scheuchzer, daughter of Heinrich, a bailiff (Landvogt).

Waser studied theology and was ordained in 1764. He took up natural science and history, and in 1765 he became a member of the Physical Society (Physikalische Gesellschaft). In 1770 he became pastor zum Kreuz (for Hottingen, Hirslanden and Riesbach). He criticized the accounting of the Riesbach community officials and obtained a fine against them. After further conflicts he was suspended from office in 1774.

He then pursued statistical and economic studies. With a "political arithmetic" he sought to put government action on a rational basis, and for this he compiled long historical data series. A city fire insurance fund (Feuerkasse) for buildings was set up in 1782 on the basis of one of his studies. Most of his works, however, did not pass the censorship and remained unprinted.

In 1780 Waser criticized the administration of the Zurich war fund (Kriegsfonds) in the German journal Schlözers Briefwechsel meist historischen und politischen Inhalts. He was then accused of betraying state secrets and of stealing state documents. By a narrow majority of the Zurich councils and in a vaguely worded judgment, he was found guilty of high treason, sentenced to death and beheaded. This met with incomprehension among the educated public far beyond Switzerland. Waser was a pioneer of statistics and economics.

== Publications ==
- Waser, Johann Heinrich (1778). Abhandlung vom Geld [Treatise on Money] (in German). Zürich: Orell, Geßner.

== Bibliography ==
- R. Graber, "Der Waser-Handel", in Schweizerische Zeitschrift für Geschichte, 30, 1980, 321–356
- U. Hentschel, "Der Waser-Handel im Spiegel der deutschen Literatur", in Zürcher Taschenbuch 2000, 1999, 177–192
- R. Graber, "Gefährliche Sammelleidenschaft", in B. Schubiger (ed.), Sammeln und Sammlungen im 18. Jahrhundert in der Schweiz, 2007, 357–369
