= Johann Heinrich Waser (mayor) =

Swiss politician (1600–1669)

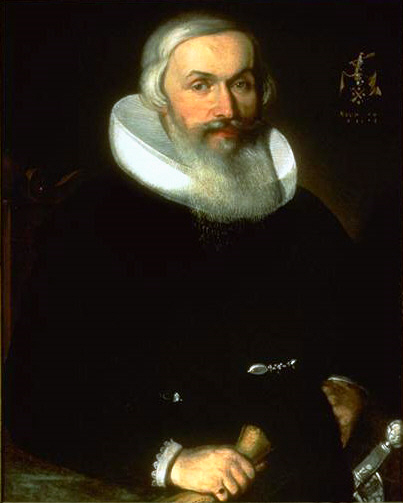
- Portrait attributed to Conrad Meyer, oil on canvas, 1654 (Swiss National Museum, Zurich)
- Born: 25 March 1600; Zurich, Switzerland
- Died: 10 February 1669 (aged 68); Zurich, Switzerland
- Occupations: Politician; diplomat
- Spouses: Anna Füssli (m. 1625) Jahel Ziegler (m. 1641) Cleophea Keller (m. 1654)

Johann Heinrich Waser (25 March 1600 – 10 February 1669) was a politician and diplomat from Zurich. He was state secretary (Staatsschreiber) of Zurich from 1633 and mayor (Bürgermeister) from 1652. In 1663 he headed the Confederate delegation that swore the renewed alliance with France in Paris.

== Biography ==
Johann Heinrich Waser was a member of the Waser family. He was the son of Caspar, a grandson of Josias Simler, and a brother of Hans Caspar and Josias. In 1625 he married Anna Füssli, daughter of Heinrich, a clerk; in 1641 Jahel Ziegler, daughter of Christoph, a councilor of Schaffhausen; and in 1654 Cleophea Keller, daughter of the Junker Hans Ulrich.

He studied in Geneva and Padua, spent time in the Valtellina, and made study journeys to Italy and England. In 1618 he accompanied the Antistes Johann Jakob Breitinger to the Synod of Dort. In 1621 he entered the Zurich state service as a volunteer. He became second state secretary (zweiter Staatsschreiber) in 1624, a member of the Grand Council (Grossrat) in 1631, state secretary in 1633, bailiff (Landvogt) of Kyburg in 1646 and mayor of Zurich in 1652. In 1654 he became a member of the society of the Schildner zum Schneggen, and in 1657 its head (Obmann). In 1647 he acquired the lordship (Herrschaft) of Lufingen and became its Gerichtsherr (lord of the court).

Waser's actions were shaped by the great questions of the confessional age. The final closure of the city's citizenship (Bürgerrecht) in 1659 took place while he was mayor. In foreign policy, he aimed to strengthen the position of the Reformed cantons against the Catholic cantons, to revise the Second Peace of Kappel (Zweiter Landfriede) and to reorganize the administration of the condominiums (gemeine Herrschaften). To achieve these aims, in 1632–1633 he also considered an alliance with the Protestant war party in the Empire and the use of military force. These efforts failed in 1656 in the First War of Villmergen. The project for a federal reform of 1655, in which Waser was closely involved, would probably have strengthened the Confederacy, but it would also have given the Reformed cantons preponderance.

Waser's name remains linked with his role in the question of the French alliance. For reasons of foreign policy, among them that alliances with the Protestant powers England and Holland were not possible, Zurich under his leadership also renewed the mercenary treaty (Soldvertrag) with France in 1663, against strong internal opposition. Waser headed the Confederate delegation that swore this alliance in Paris. He himself regarded the outcome of the alliance affair as a defeat.

Waser was an important diplomat, distinguished by a strong sense of duty and broad historical and legal knowledge. He reorganized the council archives and compiled collections of documents on important affairs of state. As state secretary of Zurich he took part in 180 federal diets (Tagsatzungen) and conferences. As a mediator he succeeded, among other things, in the dispute in the League of the Ten Jurisdictions in 1644, and his arbitral award of that year (Waser'scher Spruch) abolished the combination of the offices of Landammann of Davos and Landammann of the League. As bailiff of Kyburg he settled the tax conflict in his bailiwick. As a statesman, however, Waser was already controversial in his lifetime. He was accused several times of disloyal conduct in office in connection with the alliance question, but the council cleared him of these charges.

== Bibliography ==
- W. Schmid, "Bürgermeister Johann Heinrich Waser und Frankreich", in Zürcher Taschenbuch auf das Jahr 1947, 1946, 41–85
- R. Rey, Bürgermeister Johann Heinrich Waser, 1600–1669, 1962
- N. Domeisen, Bürgermeister Johann Heinrich Waser (1600–1669) als Politiker, 1975

=== Archives ===
- Staatsarchiv Zürich
- Zentralbibliothek Zürich
