= Conrad Meyer (painter) =

Swiss painter, engraver and medallist (1618–1689)

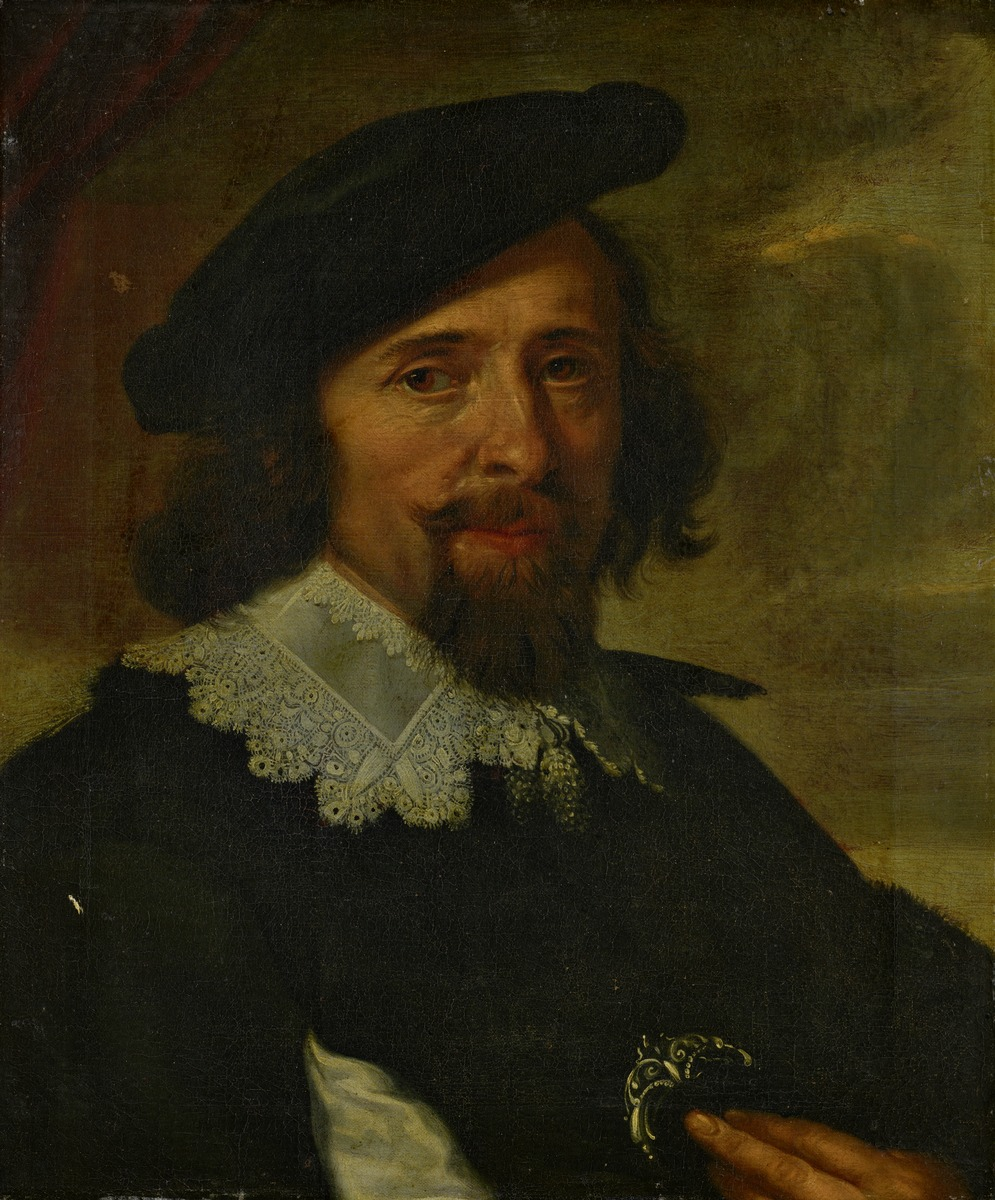
- Self-portrait, c. 1665
- Born: 3 October 1618; Zurich, Old Swiss Confederacy
- Died: 15 January 1689 (aged 70); Zurich, Old Swiss Confederacy
- Known for: Painting, drawing, etching
- Father: Dietrich Meyer the Elder
- Relatives: Rudolf Meyer (brother)

Conrad Meyer (3 October 1618 – 15 January 1689) was a Swiss painter and etcher who became one of the leading artists in seventeenth-century Zurich. His work included prints, portraits and views of the Swiss landscape.

== Biography ==
Conrad Meyer was born in Zurich on 3 October 1618 into a family of artists. His father, Dietrich Meyer the Elder, was a painter and engraver, while his brother Rudolf Meyer also became an artist. After receiving his initial training from his father, Meyer travelled between 1638 and 1642, spending time in Bern and Solothurn before continuing to Germany. In Frankfurt, he worked with Matthäus Merian the Elder.

Meyer later returned to Zurich, where he pursued a career as a painter, draughtsman and etcher. In 1649, he married Susanna Murer, a granddaughter of Jos Murer. Their son Johannes Meyer the Younger also became an artist. He died in Zurich on 15 January 1689.

== Work ==
Meyer worked in painting, drawing and etching across a wide range of subjects, including portraiture, religious and historical scenes, landscapes and illustration. He became one of the leading artists active in seventeenth-century Zurich.

Printmaking nevertheless formed a particularly important part of Meyer's career, with around 1,000 prints and illustrations known to have survived. His output included several extensive biblical and devotional series. For the Zurich civic library’s New Year publication of 1645, Meyer created an etching about table manners intended to teach young people proper behaviour at meals. Johann Wilhelm Simler wrote the accompanying verses. The publication began the library’s annual series of Zurich New Year sheets. He also accepted substantial commissions from Catholic patrons, including more than 100 etched images of saints.

Portraiture was an important source of income for Meyer in Zurich. He produced around 200 portraits, mainly of guild masters, councillors and clergy.

Meyer also depicted locations in Zurich territory and elsewhere in the Old Swiss Confederacy. His 1647 painting of the Rhine Falls has been described as the earliest topographically accurate depiction of the site. His landscape work was an important part of his contribution to Swiss art. He was among the earliest artists to treat the surrounding landscape as an independent subject.

Meyer and Jan Hackaert travelled through Switzerland four times between 1653 and 1657. During their 1655 journey through the Glarus region, Meyer produced large drawings based on close observation of the mountain landscape. The expedition has been described as the earliest European artistic journey devoted specifically to the high Alps. The resulting drawings have been described as early landmarks of Swiss landscape art.

Meyer’s works are held in several Swiss public collections, including the Kunstmuseum Basel, Kunsthaus Zürich, Zentralbibliothek Zürich, the Graphische Sammlung at ETH Zurich and the Swiss National Museum.

== Reception ==
Swiss art historian Johann Caspar Füssli praised Meyer in 1769, but his work subsequently received little sustained attention from art historians. A 1979 exhibition at the Helmhaus Zurich presented Meyer as the "inventor of Alpine painting". Published in 2025, Mühlsteinkragen und Totentanz brings together scholarly essays examining Meyer’s biography and artistic networks, portraiture, city and landscape views, religious and moralising print series, drawing technique and role in Swiss landscape painting.

== Gallery ==
Landscapes

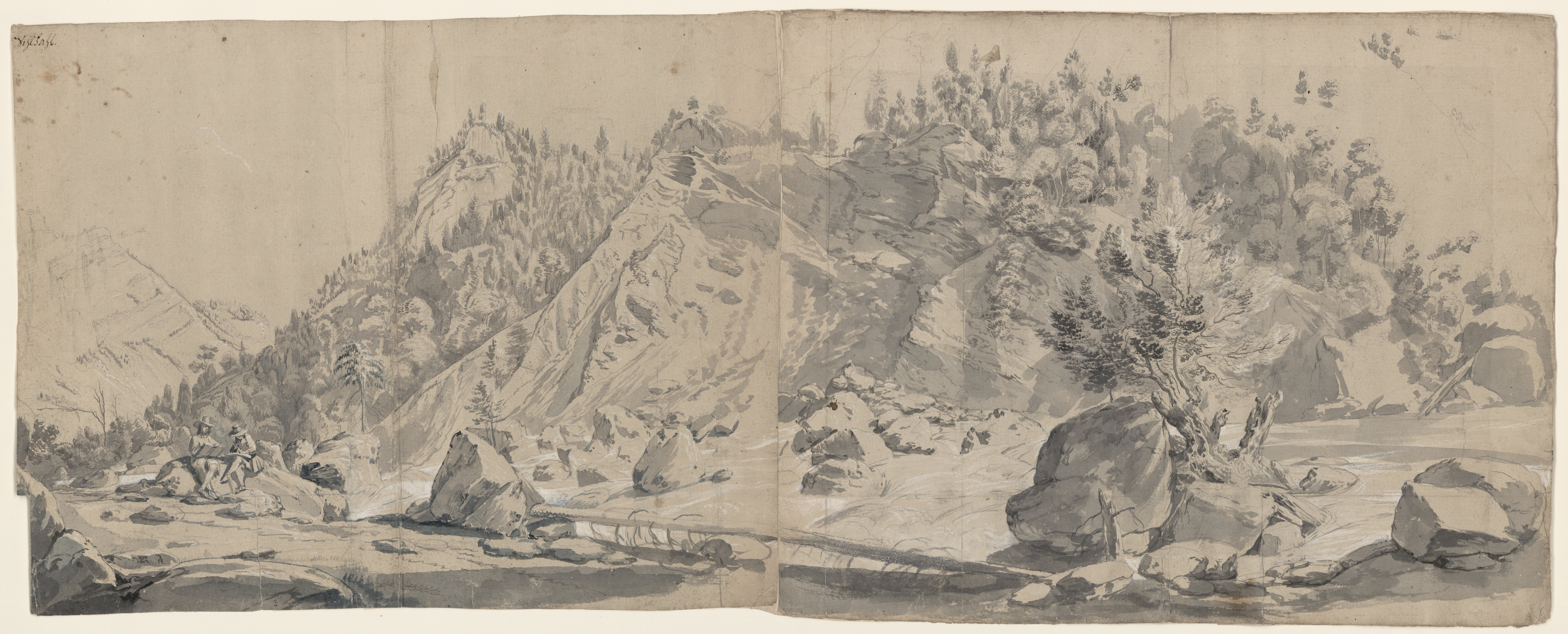
Löntsch Valley, Canton of Glarus, 1655

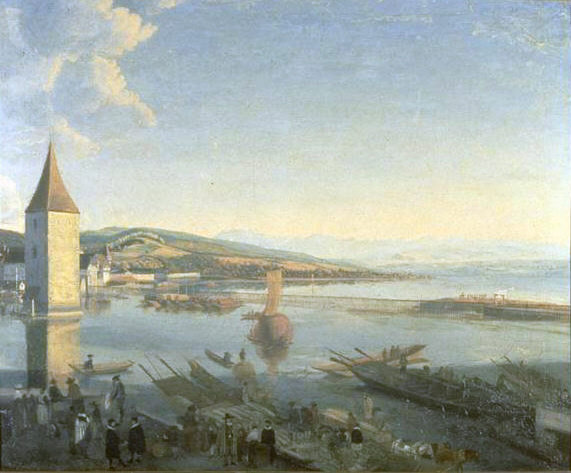
Zurich in summer, c. 1661

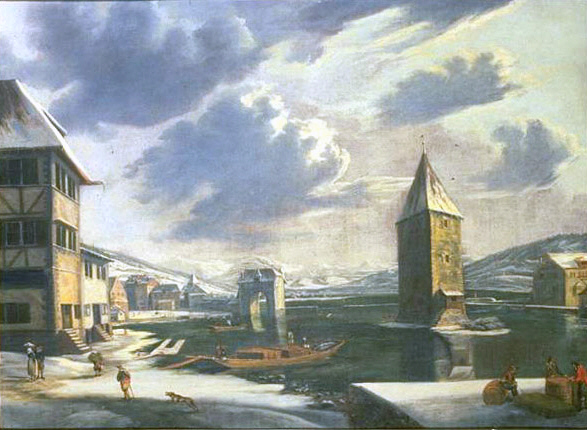
Zurich in winter, c. 1661
Portraits

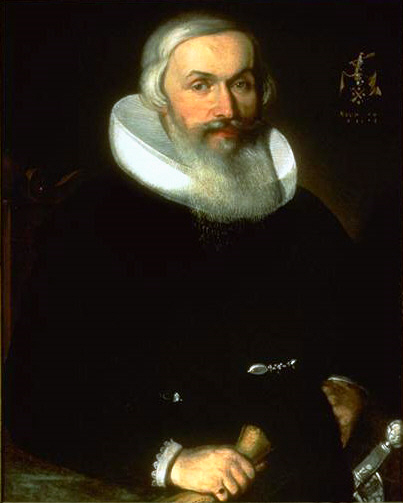
Portrait of Johann Heinrich Waser, mayor of Zurich, 1654

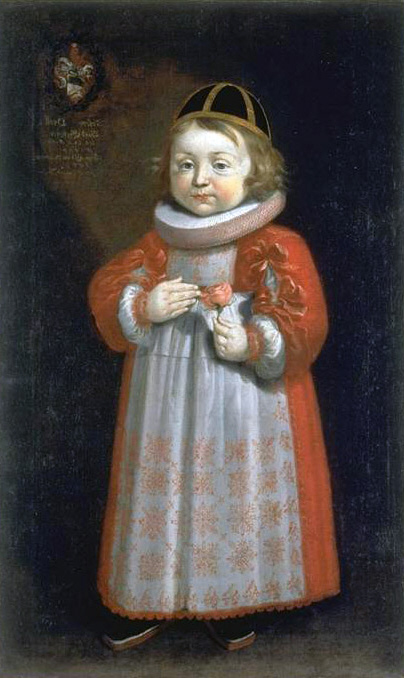
Portrait of Joseph von Orelli as a boy, 1657

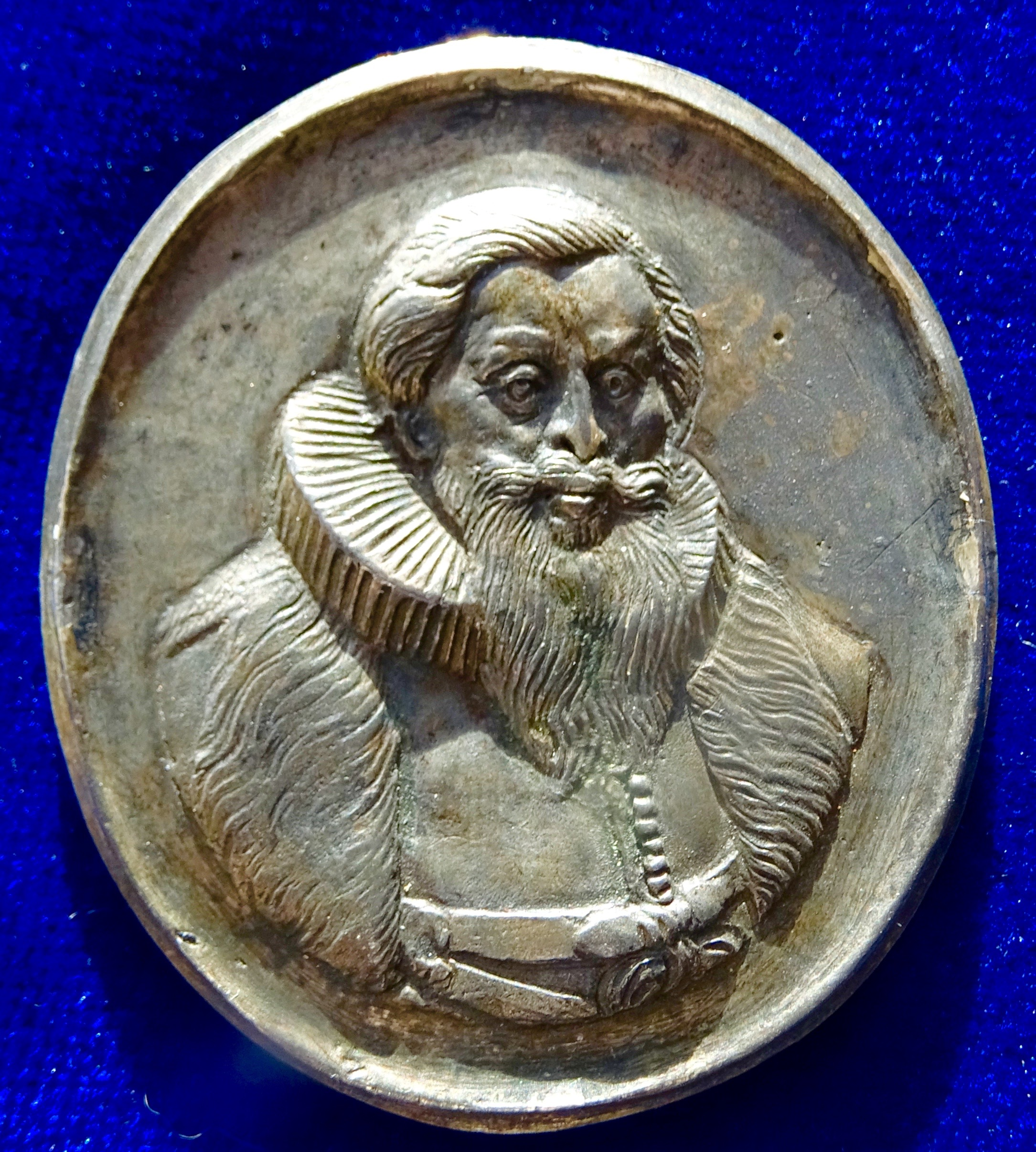
Portrait medal of Johann Heinrich Waser, 1668

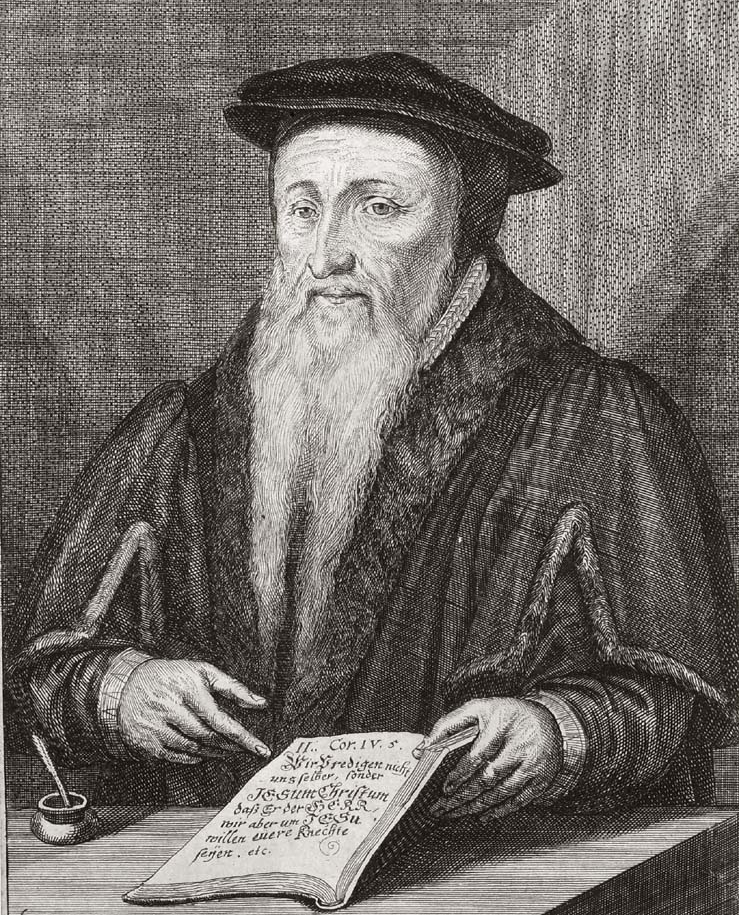
Portrait of Théodore de Bèze, 1676

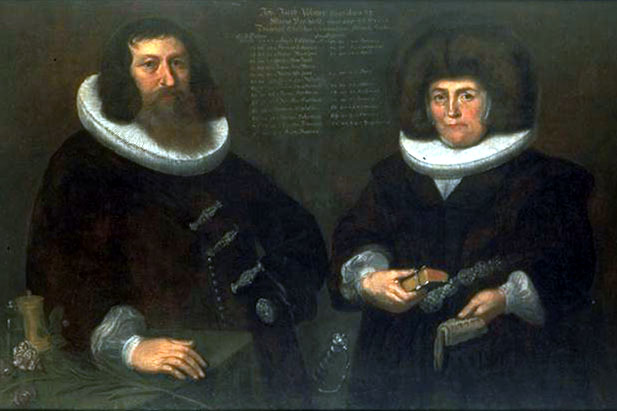
Double portrait of the executioner Volmar and his wife, 1677
