= History of Protestantism =

Protestantism originated from the Protestant Reformation of the 16th century. The term Protestant comes from the Protestation at Speyer in 1529, where the nobility protested against enforcement of the Edict of Worms which subjected advocates of Lutheranism to forfeit all of their property. However, the theological underpinnings go back much further, as Protestant theologians of the time cited both Church Fathers and the Apostles to justify their choices and formulations. The earliest origin of Protestantism is controversial; with some Protestants today claiming origin back to people in the early church deemed heretical such as Jovinian and Vigilantius.

Since the 16th century, major factors affecting Protestantism have been the Catholic Counter-Reformation which opposed it successfully especially in France, Spain and Italy. Then came an era of confessionalization followed by Rationalism, Pietism, and the Great Awakenings. Major movements today include evangelicalism, mainline denominations, and Pentecostalism.

== Overview ==
One of the early Reformers was John Wycliffe, an English theologian and early proponent of reform in the 14th century. His followers, known as Lollards, spread throughout England but soon were persecuted by both leaders in the Roman Catholic Church and government officials. Wycliffe influenced Jan Hus, a Czech priest from Prague. After Hus was burned at the stake for heresy, his followers dominated the Kingdom of Bohemia, later spreading to Silesia and Moravia. Some of his followers waged the Hussite Wars, with the Utraquist faction eventually defeating the papal backed forces.

Both Wycliffe and Hus preached against indulgences. Hus wrote his Six Errors, fixed to the door of his church, in which he criticized corruption of the clergy and touched on other topics which under the later Luther became the key to the Reformation. After the Battle of White Mountain, persecuted Hussites established minor churches such as the Unity of the Brethren (and its international branch Moravian Church).

Those early reformers influenced German friar Martin Luther, who spread the Protestant Reformation. Originally, Luther intended to reform the Roman Catholic Church rather than break it up. Reformation in Germany diversified quickly as did the earlier Hussites in Bohemian Crown, and other reform impulses arose independently of Luther. The spread of Gutenberg's printing press provided the means for the rapid dissemination of religious materials in local languages. Similar to his predecessors, Martin Luther wrote the Ninety-five Theses on the sale of indulgences in 1517. Soon, the Reformed tradition began in Switzerland under the leadership of Huldrych Zwingli in 1519. The Reformation evolved into a large debate involving theologians throughout most of Europe. The political separation of the Church of England from Rome under Henry VIII brought England alongside this movement. The work and writings of John Calvin helped establish a loose consensus among various groups in Switzerland, Scotland, the Netherlands, Hungary, Germany and elsewhere. Calvinism within the Reformed tradition separated into specific subgroups like the Continental Reformed, Presbyterianism, Congregationalism and a variety of English Dissenters, including the Puritans. Other important movements that emerged during the Reformation include Anabaptism, Arminianism, the Baptist movement and Unitarianism.

After excommunicating Luther in 1521 with the papal bull Decet Romanum Pontificem, Church leaders together with the Holy Roman Empire condemned his followers in the 1521 Edict of Worms. This was the beginning of the Counter-Reformation. When the Lutherans gave the 1530 Augsburg Confession, the Catholics responded with the Confutatio Augustana. The Lutherans gained provisional tolerance for their faith with the Nuremberg Religious Peace, during which the reformer Phillip Melancthon in turn responded with the 1537 Apology of the Augsburg Confession. Although it was rejected by Charles V, there was no document written in response on the Catholic side, and Luther submitted his 1537 Smalcald Articles for consideration to the German nobility, which he wrote also in the hopes that the impending council would not misrepresent his positions, even if it were just going to condemn them. From 1545 to 1563, Roman Catholic officials met at the Council of Trent, as well as some Protestants, although they were not allowed to vote. The Lutheran response to this council in turn came from Martin Chemnitz, who published the Examination of the Council of Trent from 1565 to 1573. In order to refute him, Diogo de Payva de Andrada wrote the Defensio Tridentinæ fidei which was considerably shorter and published posthumously in 1578. Lutherans never responded to this work. The Jesuit order was founded at the time of the Council of Trent in order to stop the Reformation, and powerful monarchs like the Habsburgs were also committed to the Counter-Reformation. Many Protestants became crypto-Protestants in areas under Habsburg control.

In the course of this religious upheaval, the German Peasants' War of 1524–1525 swept through Bavaria, Thuringia and Swabia. The Nuremberg Religious Peace was breached at the start of the Schmalkaldic War in 1546. Their loss resulted in the imposition of Counter-Reformational measures during the Augsburg Interim, which were intended to bring them closer to Roman Catholicism, but the terms of the 1555 Peace of Augsburg ended this by allowing rulers to choose the religion of their domains (Latin: Cuius regio, eius religio) as either Catholic or Lutheran. The confessional division of the states of the Holy Roman Empire eventually erupted in the Thirty Years' War of 1618–1648, leaving the agglomeration severely weakened. France suffered its own religious wars. The Dutch people rebelled in the Eighty Years' War. The War of the Three Kingdoms affected the British Isles.

While the Counter-Reformation on the continent continued until the 19th century, (Note: See Zillertal for the tail end of the Counter-Reformation) the growth of a Puritan party dedicated to further Protestant reform polarized the Elizabethan Age, although it was not until the Civil War of the 1640s that England underwent religious strife comparable to that which its neighbours had suffered some generations before. Nonconforming Protestants along with the Protestant refugees from continental Europe were the primary founders of the United States of America. In the middle 17th century, Pietism became an important influence in Lutheranism.

The Great Awakenings were periods of rapid and dramatic religious revival in American religious history, from the 1730s to the mid-19th century. As a result, a multitude of diverse Protestant denominations emerged. In the First Great Awakening, John Wesley founded Methodism which in turn sparked evangelicalism. The Second Great Awakening brought Adventism, the Holiness movement and Plymouth Brethren alongside other denominations. The Salvation Army was founded during the Third Great Awakening. Some scholars propose the Fourth Great Awakening took place in the late 20th century. Modernist and liberal streams shaped mainline denominations during the Age of Enlightenment.

In the 20th century, Protestantism was becoming increasingly fragmented with Pentecostalism, Charismatic movement, Neo-charismatic movement, Nondenominational churches, house churches, Neo-orthodoxy, Paleo-orthodoxy, numerous Christian fundamentalist, evangelical, independent, and other groups emerging mainly in the United States and the developing world. In particular, American Protestantism was affected by this phenomenon with both mainline and conservative sides being affected. Beginning in the 1980s, the rapid fragmenting became accompanied by a general secularization of Western society. While all these movements spilled over to Europe to a limited degree, the development of Protestantism in Europe was more dominated by secularization, leading to an increasingly post-Christian Europe.

In the 21st century, Protestantism continues to divide, while simultaneously expanding on a worldwide scale largely due to rising Evangelical Protestant and Pentecostal movements.

== Historical maps ==
=== Europe ===
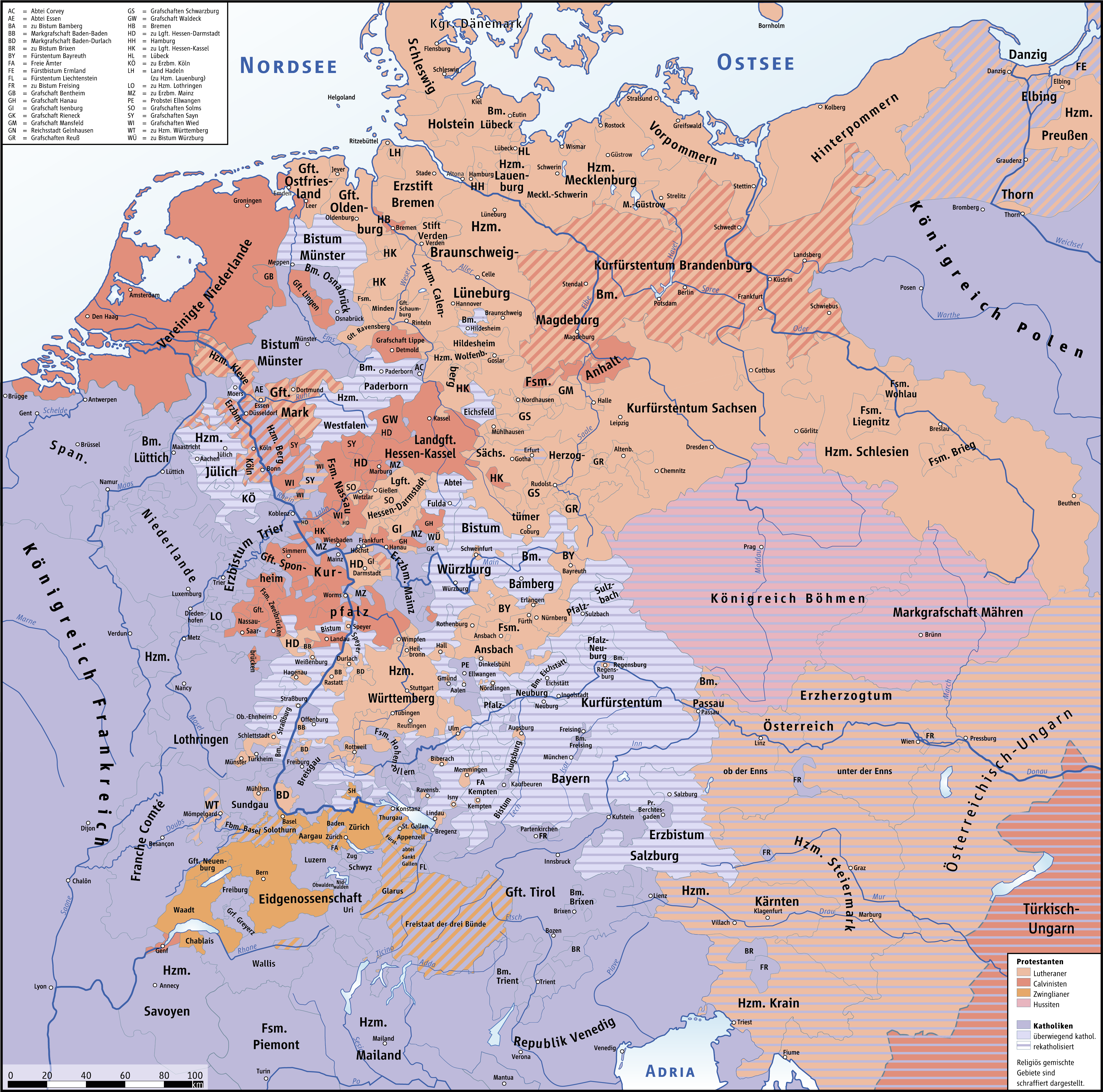
Distribution of Protestantism and Roman Catholicism in Central Europe on the eve of the Thirty Years' War (1618) Crypto-Protestants are not shown.

Approximate spread of Protestantism after the Reformation, and following the Counter-Reformation. Crypto-Protestants are not shown.

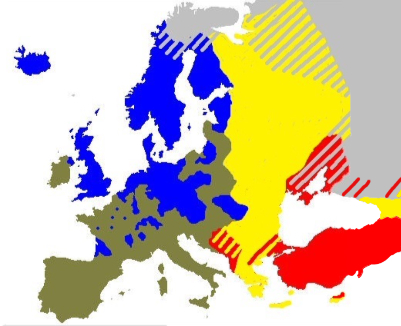
Approximate spread of Protestantism at the Reformation's peak. Islam is marked in red. Crypto-Protestants, Crypto-papists, and Crypto-Muslims are not shown.

The Protestant Reformation at its peak

After the Counter-Reformation. Crypto-Protestants are not shown.

After the Edict of Fontainebleau. Crypto-Protestants are not shown.

Modern spread after the Irish independence, Expulsion of Finns from Karelia and the Expulsions of Germans

=== World ===
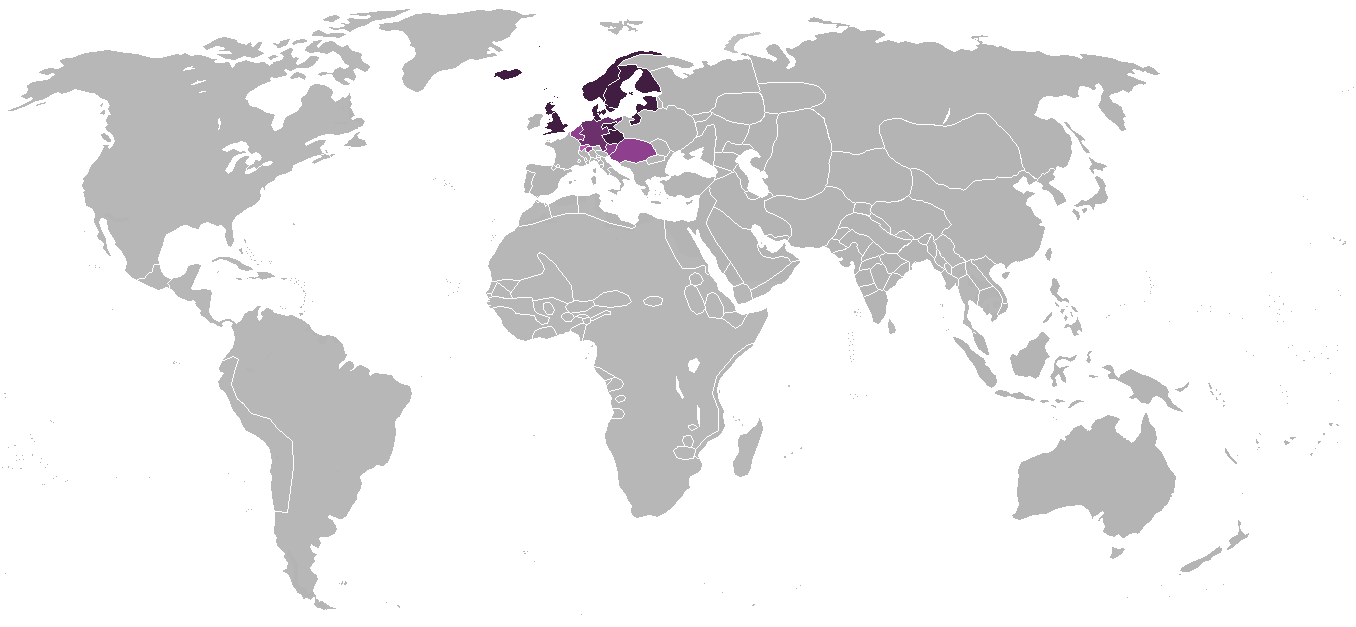
Countries by percentage of Protestants in 1545.

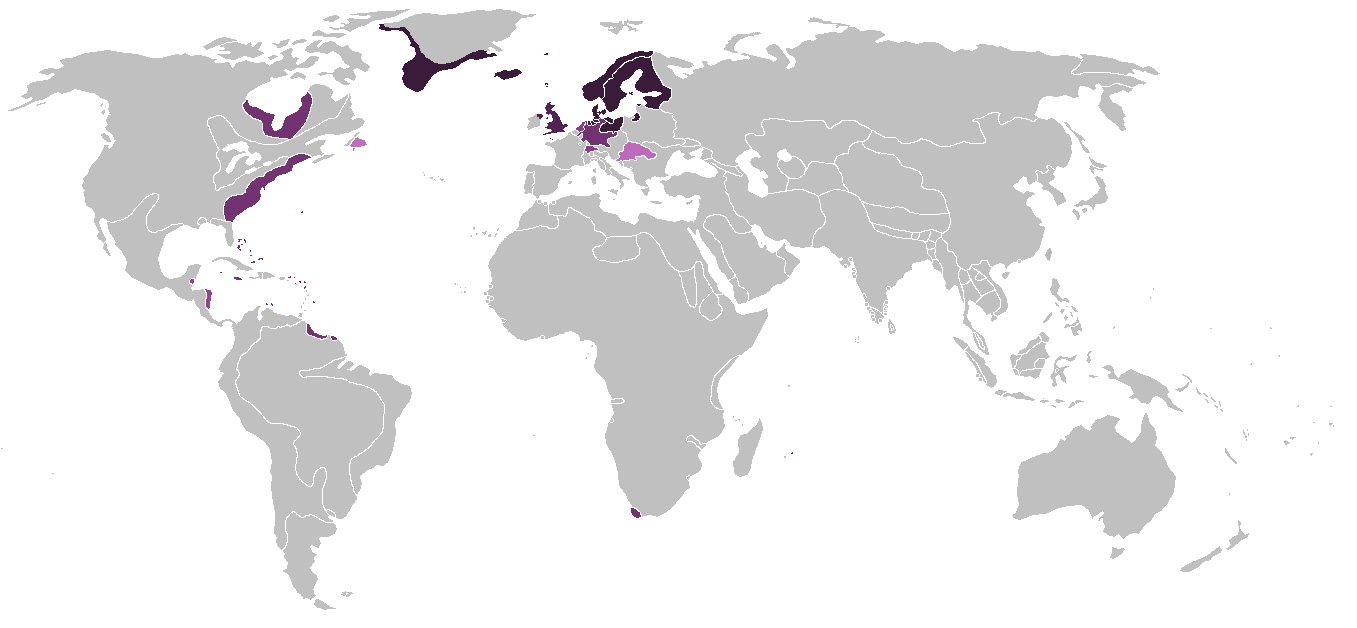
Countries by percentage of Protestants in 1710.

Countries by percentage of Protestants in 1938.

Countries by percentage of Protestants in 2010.

Protestant majority countries in 1938.

Protestant majority countries in 2010.

== Origins ==
Protestants generally trace to the 16th century their separation from the Catholic Church. Mainstream Protestantism began with the Magisterial Reformation, so called because it received support from the magistrates (that is, the civil authorities). The Radical Reformation, had no state sponsorship. Older Protestant churches, such as the Unitas Fratrum (Unity of the Brethren), Moravian Brethren or the Bohemian Brethren trace their origin to the time of Jan Hus in the early 15th century. As the Hussite movement was led by a majority of Bohemian nobles and recognized for a time by the Basel Compacts, this is considered by some to be the first Magisterial Reformation in Europe. In Germany, a hundred years later, protests against Roman Catholic authorities erupted in many places at once during a time of threatened Islamic Ottoman invasion ¹ which distracted the German princes in particular. To some degree, these protests can be explained by the events of the previous two centuries in Europe and particularly in Bohemia. Earlier in the south of France, where the old influence of the Cathars led to the growing protests against the pope and his authorities, Guillaume Farel (b. 1489) preached reformation as early as 1522 in Dauphiné, where the French Wars of Religion later originated in 1562, also known as Huguenot wars. These also spread later to other parts of Europe.

=== Roots ===
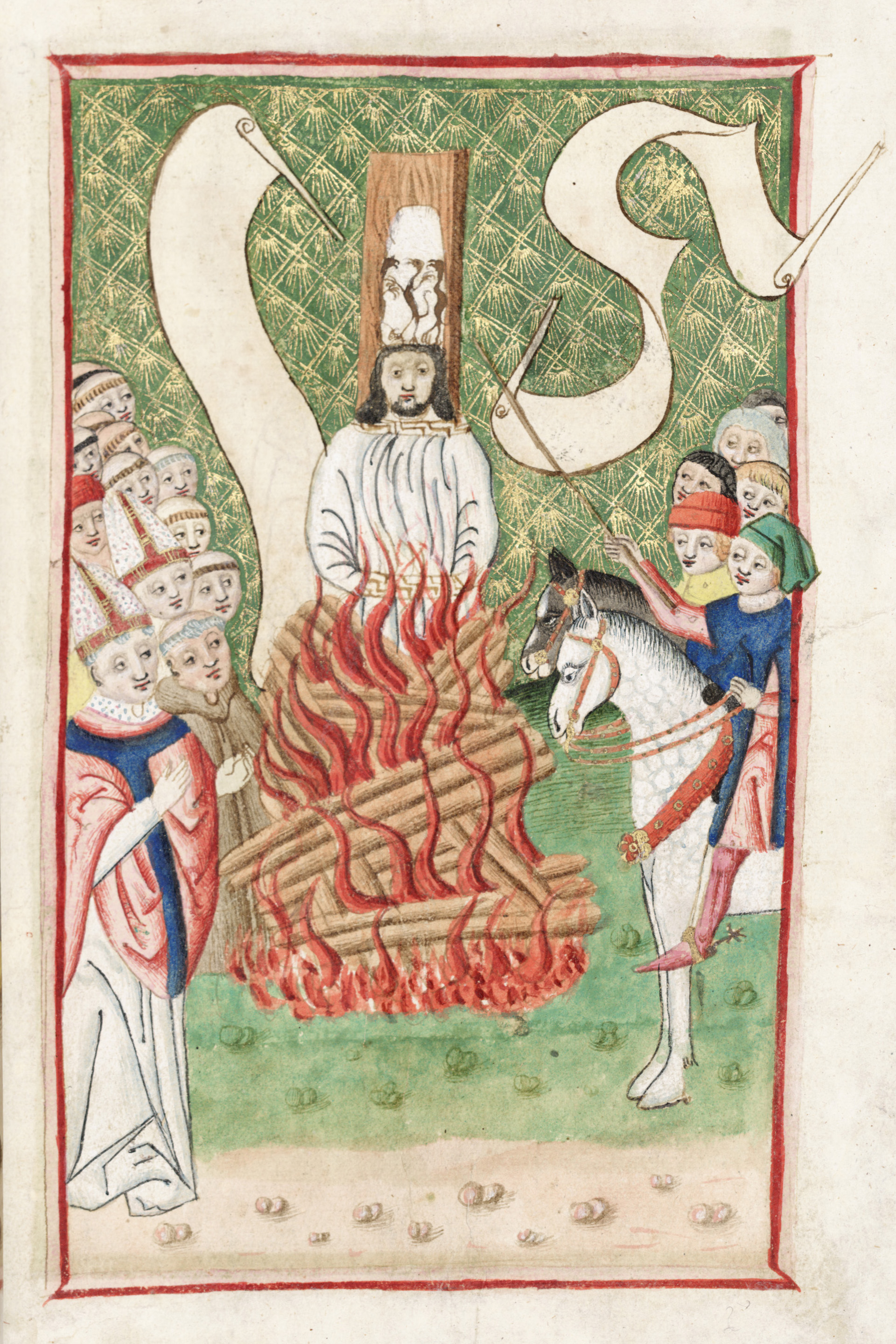
Execution of Jan Hus at the Council of Constance in 1415. His death led to a radicalization of the Bohemian Reformation and to the Hussite Wars in the Crown of Bohemia.

In the 9th century Claudius of Turin foreshadowed many Protestant views, and had a fanatical zeal for iconoclasm. Claudius of Turin denied the power of the papacy, and the role of good works in salvation, thus believing in faith alone. Gottschalk of Orbais was another 9th-century theologian, who taught double predestination and grace-oriented views of salvation, mirroring the doctrine of faith alone. Gottschalk was defended by Ratramnus, who denied transubstantiation and whose writings influenced some reformers.

Unrest due to the Avignon Papacy and the Papal Schism in the Roman Catholic Church (1378–1416) sparked wars between princes, uprisings among peasants, and widespread concern over corruption in the Church. A new nationalism also challenged the relatively internationalist medieval world. The first of a series of disruptive and new perspectives came from John Wycliffe at Oxford University, then from Jan Hus at the University of Prague (Hus had been influenced by Wycliffe). The Catholic Church officially concluded debate over Hus's teachings at the Council of Constance (1414–1417). The conclave condemned Jan Hus, who was executed by burning in spite of a promise of safe-conduct. At the command of Pope Martin V, Wycliffe's body was exhumed and burned as a heretic twelve years after his burial.

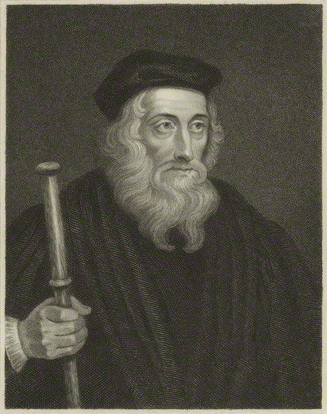
John Wycliffe.

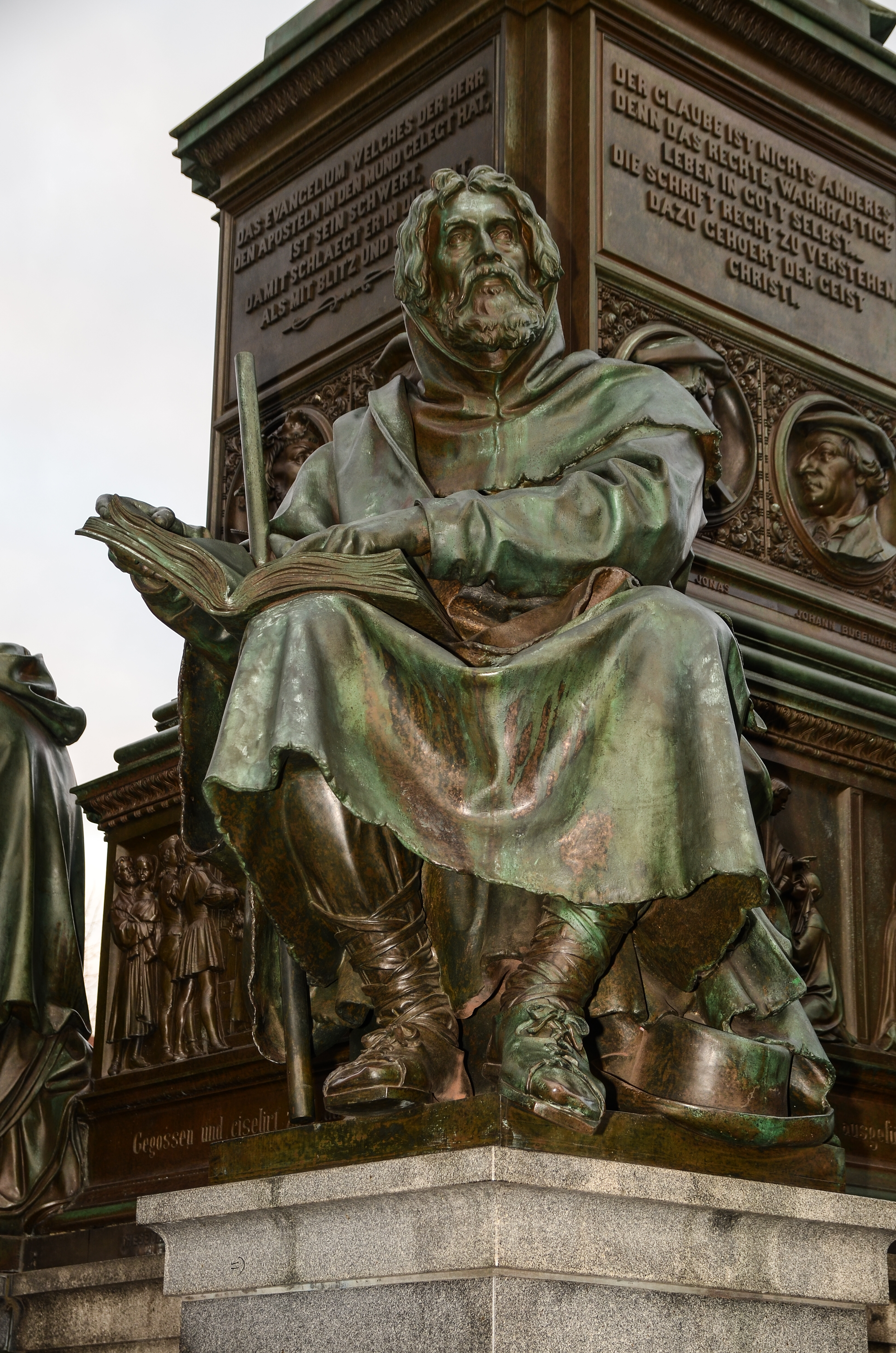
Peter Waldo.

The Council of Constance confirmed and strengthened the traditional medieval conception of Churches and Empires. It did not address the national or theological tensions which had been stirred up during the previous century. The council could not prevent schism and the Hussite Wars in Bohemia.

Following the breakdown of monastic institutions and scholasticism in late medieval Europe, accentuated by the "Babylonian Captivity" of the Papacy, the Papal Schism, and the failure of the Conciliar movement, the sixteenth century saw a great cultural debate about religious reforms and later fundamental religious values (See German mysticism). Historians would generally assume that the failure to reform (too many vested interests; lack of coordination in the reforming coalition) would eventually lead to a greater upheaval or even revolution, since the system must eventually be adjusted or disintegrate, and the failure of the Conciliar movement helped lead to the Protestant Reformation in Europe. These frustrated reformist movements ranged from nominalism, devotio moderna (modern devotion), to humanism occurring in conjunction with economic, political and demographic forces that contributed to a growing disaffection with the wealth and power of the elite clergy, sensitizing the population to the financial and moral corruption of the secular Renaissance church.

The outcome of the Black Death encouraged a radical reorganization of the economy, and eventually of European society. In the emerging urban centers, however, the calamities of the fourteenth and early fifteenth century, and the resultant labor shortages, provided a strong impetus for economic diversification and technological innovations. Following the Black Death, the initial loss of life due to famine, plague, and pestilence contributed to an intensification of capital accumulation in the urban areas, and thus a stimulus to trade, industry, and burgeoning urban growth in fields as diverse as banking (the Fugger banking family in Augsburg and the Medici family of Florence being the most prominent); textiles, armaments, especially stimulated by the Hundred Years' War, and mining of iron ore due, in large part, to the booming armaments industry. Accumulation of surplus, competitive overproduction, and heightened competition to maximize economic advantage, contributed to civil war, aggressive militarism, and thus to centralization. As a direct result of the move toward centralization, leaders like Louis XI of France (1461–1483), the "spider king", sought to remove all constitutional restrictions on the exercise of their authority. In England, France, and Spain the move toward centralization begun in the thirteenth century was carried to a successful conclusion.

But as recovery and prosperity progressed, enabling the population to reach its former levels in the late 15th and 16th centuries, the combination of a newly-abundant labor supply and improved productivity, was a mixed blessing for many segments of Western European society. Despite tradition, landlords started to exclude peasants from "common lands". With trade stimulated, landowners increasingly moved away from the manorial economy. Woollen manufacturing greatly expanded in France, Germany, and the Netherlands and new textile industries began to develop.

The invention of movable type led to Protestant zeal for translating the Bible and getting it into the hands of the laity.

The "humanism" of the Renaissance period stimulated unprecedented academic ferment, and a concern for academic freedom. Ongoing, earnest theoretical debates occurred in the universities about the nature of the church, and the source and extent of the authority of the papacy, of councils, and of princes.

=== 16th century ===
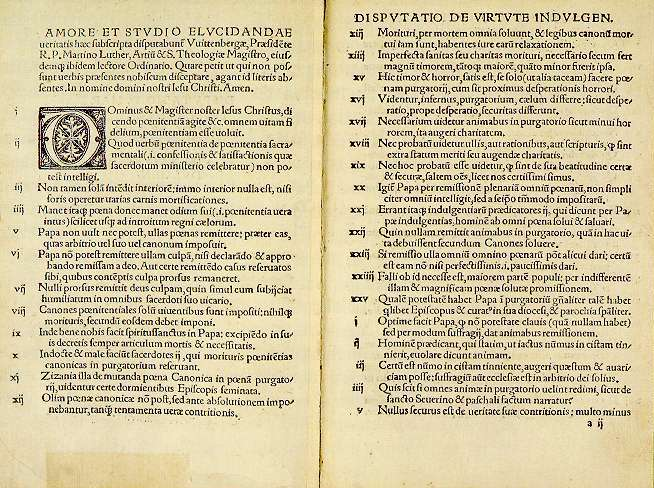
Martin Luther's Ninety-Five Theses placed in doubt and repudiated several of the Roman Catholic practices.

Protests against Rome began in earnest when Martin Luther, an Augustinian friar and professor at the university of Wittenberg, called in 1517 for a reopening of the debate on the sale of indulgences. The quick spread of discontent occurred to a large degree because of the printing press and the resulting swift movement of both ideas and documents, including the 95 Theses. Information was also widely disseminated in manuscript form, as well as by cheap prints and woodcuts amongst the poorer sections of society.

Parallel to events in Germany, a movement began in Switzerland under the leadership of Ulrich Zwingli. These two movements quickly agreed on most issues, as the recently introduced printing press spread ideas rapidly from place to place, but some unresolved differences kept them separate. Some followers of Zwingli believed that the Reformation was too conservative, and moved independently toward more radical positions, some of which survive among modern day Anabaptists. Other Protestant movements grew up along lines of mysticism or humanism (cf. Erasmus), sometimes breaking from Rome or from the Protestants, or forming outside of the churches.

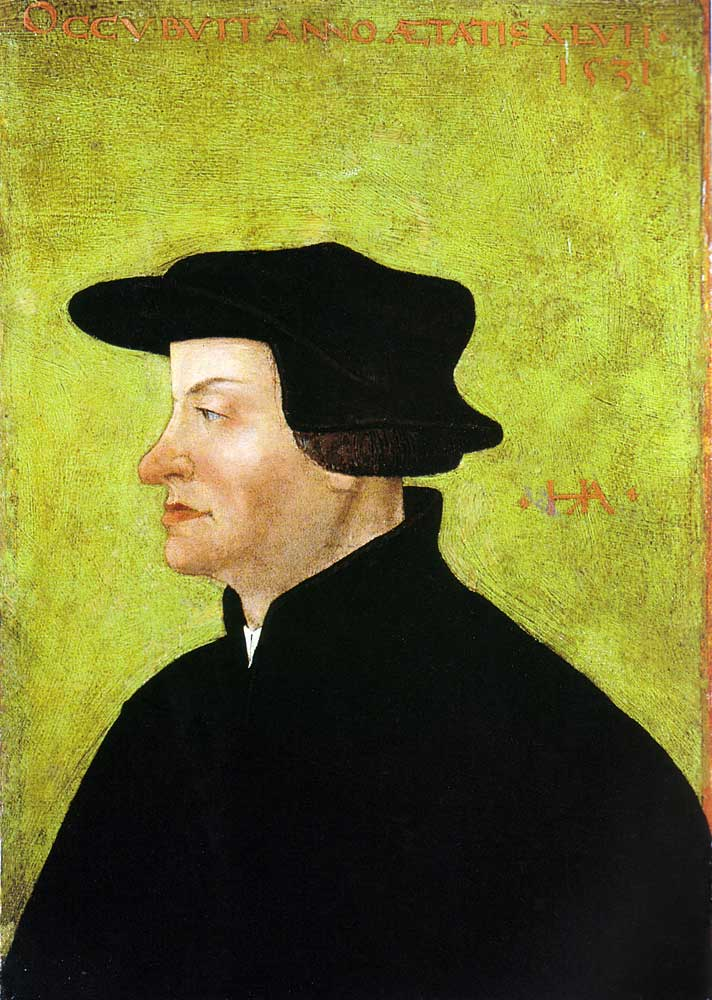
Huldrych Zwingli launched the Reformation in Switzerland.

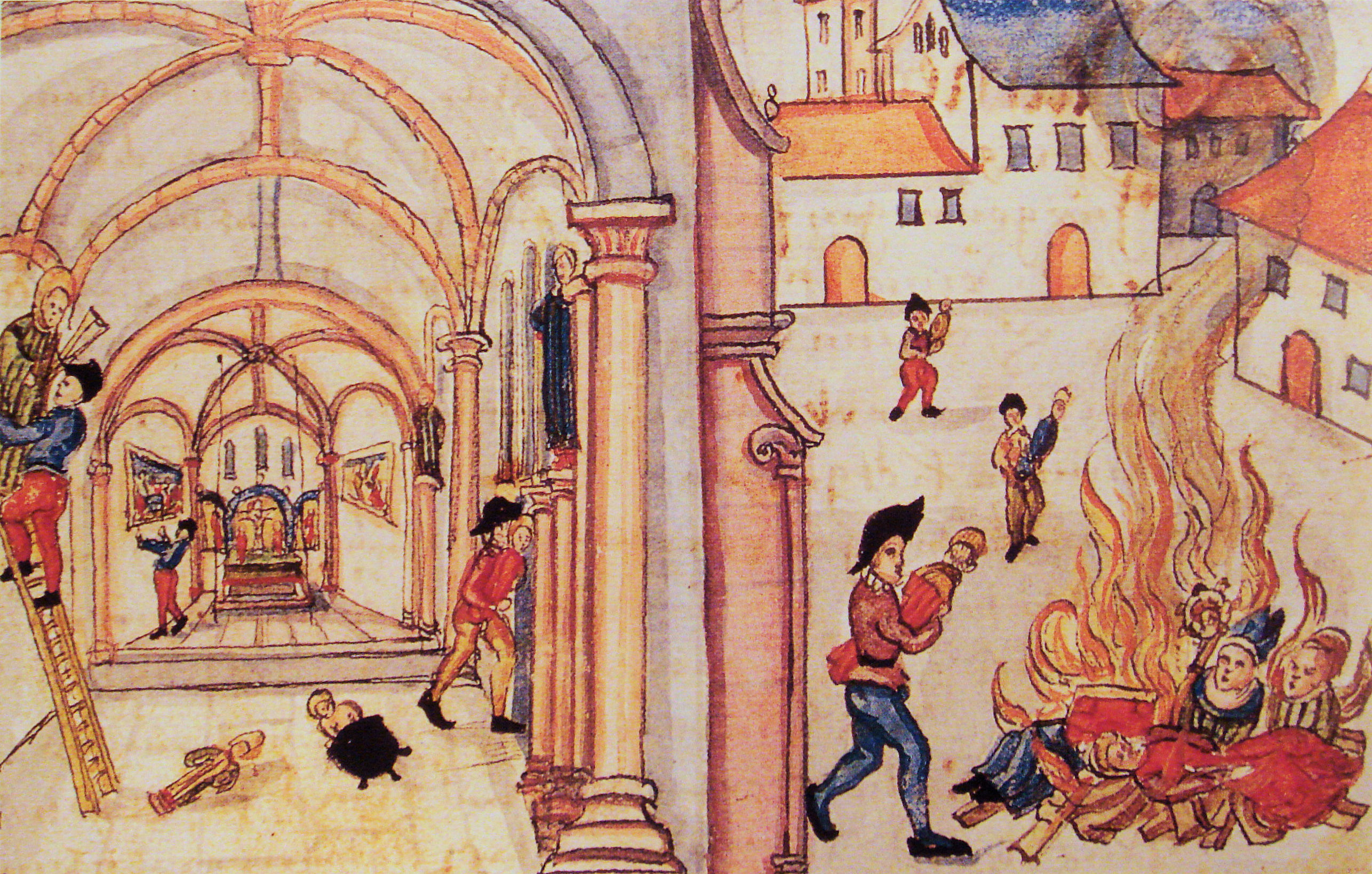
Iconoclasm was caused by the Protestant rejection of the Roman Catholic saints. Zürich, 1524.

After this first stage of the Reformation, following the excommunication of Luther and condemnation of the Reformation by the Pope, the work and writings of John Calvin were influential in establishing a loose consensus among various groups in Switzerland, Scotland, Hungary, Germany and elsewhere.

The Reformation foundations engaged with Augustinianism. Both Luther and Calvin thought along lines linked with the theological teachings of Augustine of Hippo. The Augustinianism of the Reformers struggled against Pelagianism, a heresy that they perceived in the Catholic Church of their day. In the course of this religious upheaval, the German Peasants' War of 1524–1525 swept through the Bavarian, Thuringian and Swabian principalities, leaving scores of Catholics dead at the hands of Protestant bands, including the Black Company of Florian Geier, a knight from Giebelstadt who joined the peasants in the outrage against the Catholic hierarchy.

The political separation of the Church of England from Rome under Henry VIII, beginning in 1529 and completed in 1536, brought England alongside this broad Reformed movement. However, religious changes in the English national church proceeded more conservatively than elsewhere in Europe. Reformers in the Church of England alternated, for centuries, between sympathies for Catholic traditions and Protestantism, forging a stable compromise between adherence to ancient tradition and Protestantism, which is now sometimes called the via media.

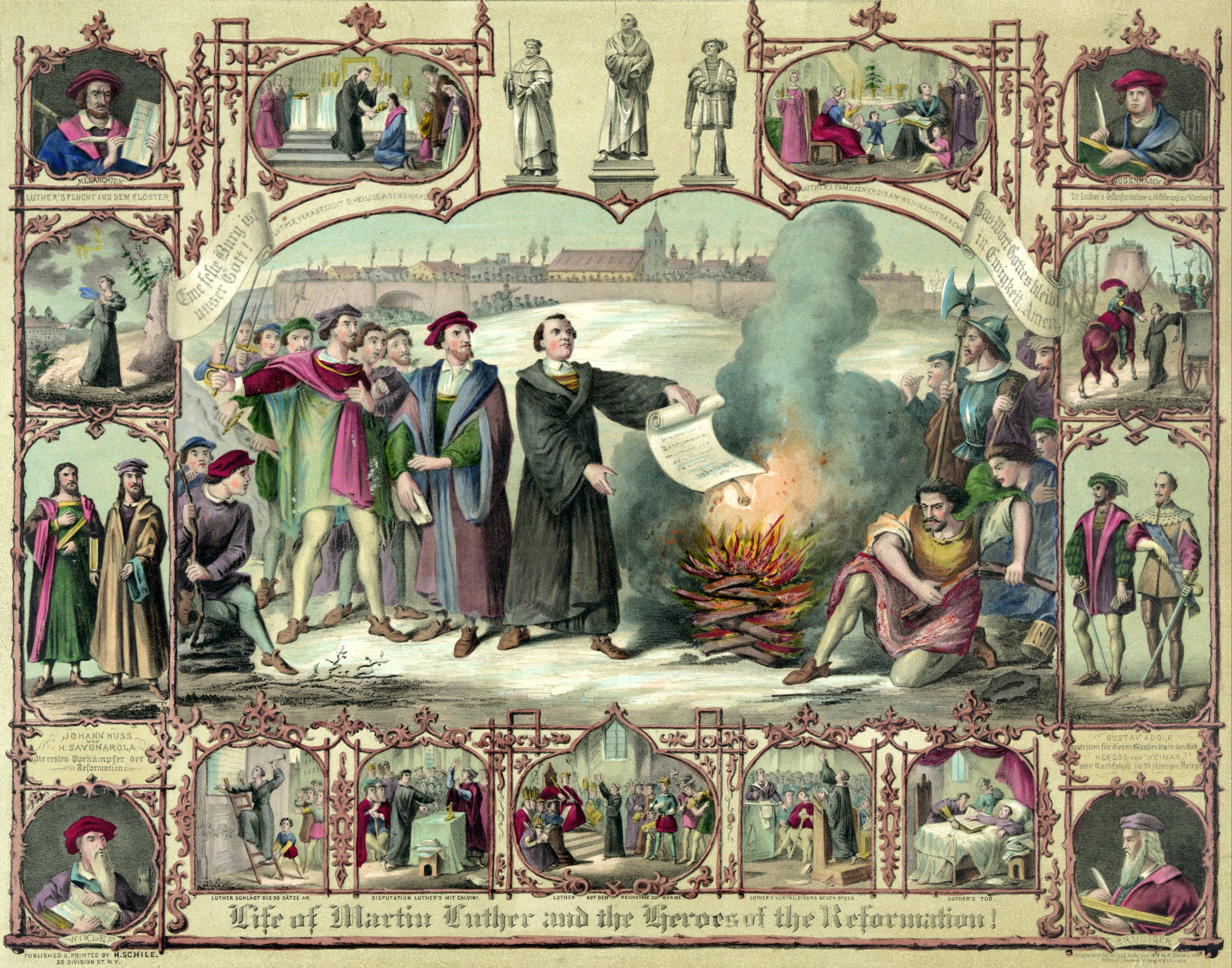
Life of Martin Luther and the heroes of the Reformation.

Martin Luther, John Calvin, and Ulrich Zwingli are considered Magisterial Reformers because their reform movements were supported by ruling authorities or "magistrates". Frederick the Wise not only supported Luther, who was a professor at the university he founded, but also protected him by hiding Luther in Wartburg Castle in Eisenach. Zwingli and Calvin were supported by the city councils in Zürich and Geneva. Since the term "magister" also means "teacher", the Magisterial Reformation is also characterized by an emphasis on the authority of a teacher. This is made evident in the prominence of Luther, Calvin, and Zwingli as leaders of the reform movements in their respective areas of ministry.

Because of their authority, they were often criticized by Radical Reformers as being too much like the Roman Popes. For example, Radical Reformer Andreas von Bodenstein Karlstadt referred to the Wittenberg theologians as the "new papists".

=== Impact of humanism ===
The frustrated reformism of the humanists, ushered in by the Renaissance, contributed to a growing impatience among reformers. Erasmus and later figures like Martin Luther and Zwingli would emerge from this debate and eventually contribute to another major schism of Christendom. The crisis of theology beginning with William of Ockham in the fourteenth century was occurring in conjunction with the new burgher discontent. Since the breakdown of the philosophical foundations of scholasticism, the new nominalism did not bode well for an institutional church legitimized as an intermediary between man and God. New thinking favored the notion that no religious doctrine can be supported by philosophical arguments, eroding the old alliance between reason and faith of the medieval period laid out by Thomas Aquinas.

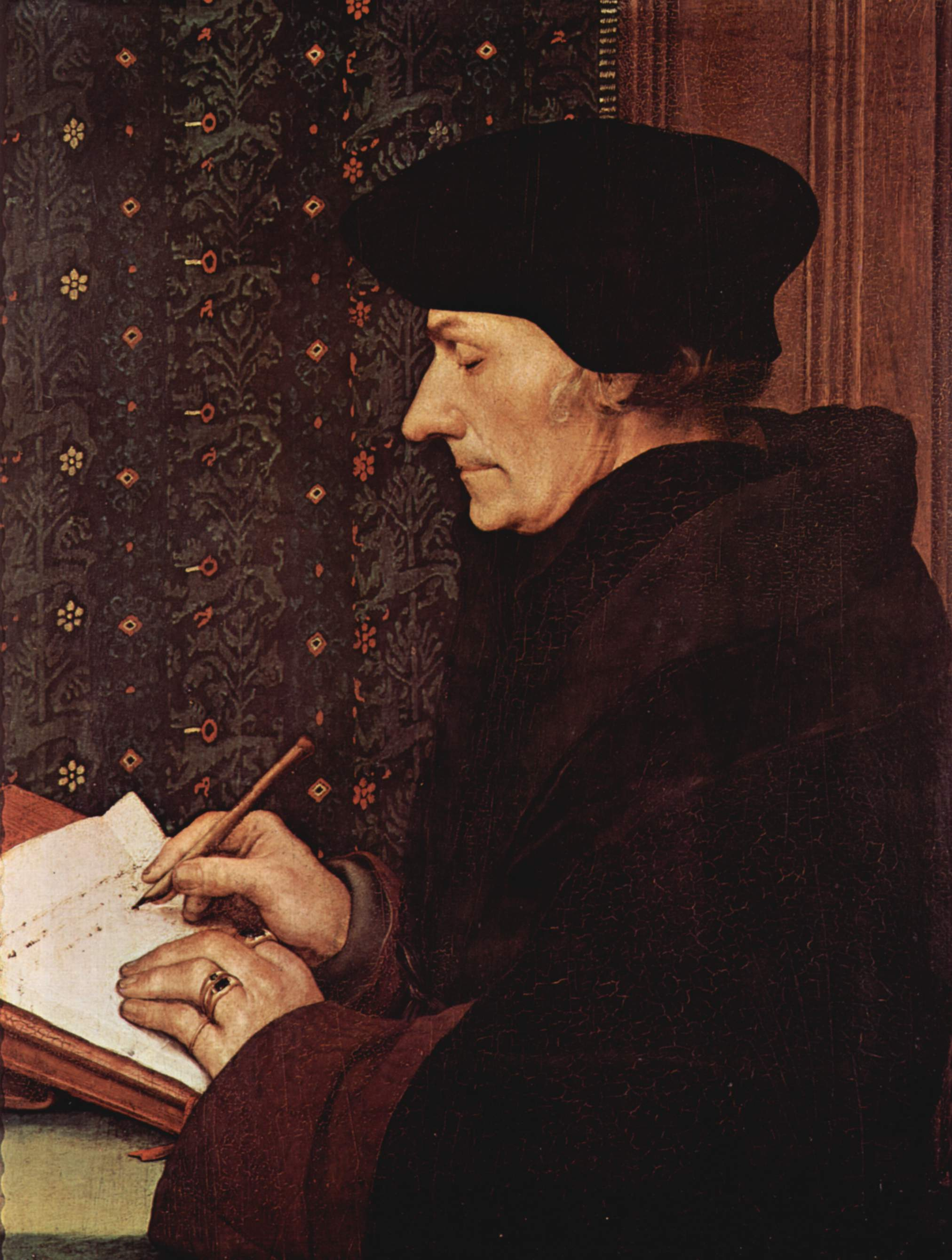
Erasmus was a Catholic priest who inspired some of the Protestant reformers.

The major individualistic reform movements that revolted against medieval scholasticism and the institutions that underpinned it were humanism, devotionalism, (see for example, the Brothers of the Common Life and Jan Standonck) and the observantine tradition. In Germany, "the modern way" or devotionalism caught on in the universities, requiring a redefinition of God, who was no longer a rational governing principle but an arbitrary, unknowable will that cannot be limited. God was now a ruler, and religion would be more fervent and emotional. Thus, the ensuing revival of Augustinian theology, stating that man cannot be saved by his own efforts but only by the grace of God, would erode the legitimacy of the rigid institutions of the church meant to provide a channel for man to do good works and get into heaven. Humanism, however, was more of an educational reform movement with origins in the Renaissance's revival of classical learning and thought. A revolt against Aristotelian logic, it placed great emphasis on reforming individuals through eloquence as opposed to reason. The European Renaissance laid the foundation for the Northern humanists in its reinforcement of the traditional use of Latin as the great unifying language of European culture.

The polarization of the scholarly community in Germany over the Reuchlin (1455–1522) affair, attacked by the elite clergy for his study of Hebrew and Jewish texts, brought Luther fully in line with the humanist educational reforms who favored academic freedom. At the same time, the impact of the Renaissance would soon backfire against traditional Catholicism, ushering in an age of reform and a repudiation of much of medieval Latin tradition. Led by Erasmus, the humanists condemned various forms of corruption within the Church, forms of corruption that might not have been any more prevalent than during the medieval zenith of the church. Erasmus held that true religion was a matter of inward devotion rather than outward symbols of ceremony and ritual. Going back to ancient texts, scriptures, from this viewpoint the greatest culmination of the ancient tradition, are the guides to life. Favoring moral reforms and de-emphasizing didactic ritual, Erasmus laid the groundwork for Luther. Reuchlin assisted Luther, especially with Hebrew and also by sending his nephew Phillip Melancthon to teach at the University in Wittenberg.

Humanism's intellectual anti-clericalism would profoundly influence Luther. The increasingly well-educated middle sectors of Northern Germany, namely the educated community and city dwellers would turn to Luther's rethinking of religion to conceptualize their discontent according to the cultural medium of the era. The great rise of the burghers, the desire to run their new businesses free of institutional barriers or outmoded cultural practices, contributed to the appeal of humanist individualism. To many, papal institutions were rigid, especially regarding their views on just price and usury. In the North, burghers and monarchs were united in their frustration for not paying any taxes to the nation, but collecting taxes from subjects and sending the revenues disproportionately to the Pope in Italy.

These trends heightened demands for significant reform and revitalization along with anticlericalism. New thinkers began noticing the divide between the priests and the flock. The clergy, for instance, were not always well-educated. Parish priests often did not know Latin and rural parishes often did not have great opportunities for theological education for many at the time. Due to its large landholdings and institutional rigidity, a rigidity to which the excessively large ranks of the clergy contributed, many bishops studied law, not theology, being relegated to the role of property managers trained in administration. While priests emphasized works of religiosity, the respectability of the church began diminishing, especially among well educated urbanites, and especially considering the recent strings of political humiliation, such as the apprehension of Pope Boniface VIII by Philip IV of France, the "Babylonian Captivity", the Great Schism, and the failure of Conciliar reformism. In a sense, the campaign by Pope Leo X to raise funds to rebuild St. Peter's Basilica was too much of an excess by the secular Renaissance church, prompting high-pressure indulgences that rendered the clergy establishments even more disliked in the cities.

Luther borrowed from the humanists the sense of individualism, that each man can be his own priest (an attitude likely to find popular support considering the rapid rise of an educated urban middle class in the North), and that the only true authority is the Bible, echoing the reformist zeal of the Conciliar movement and opening up the debate once again on limiting the authority of the Pope. While his ideas called for the sharp redefinition of the dividing lines between the laity and the clergy, his ideas were still, by this point, reformist in nature. Luther's contention that the human will was incapable of choosing good on its own, however, resulted in his rift with Erasmus finally distinguishing Lutheran reformism from humanism. On this issue, Luther sided with Thomistic scholarship (sometimes termed the "schola antiqua" or "old school") and Erasmus with the "schola moderna" or "new school," which especially relied on Scotist and Franciscan epistemology. Luther did not consistently identify with one camp or another for nearly his whole career. Instead, when debating he tactically took positions allying himself with one camp or the other on issues as it suited his overall purpose during debates. It was especially his intention to guard against the threat he feared the voluntarism of the increasingly popular schola moderna posed to the doctrine of justification.

=== Lutherans and the Holy Roman Empire ===
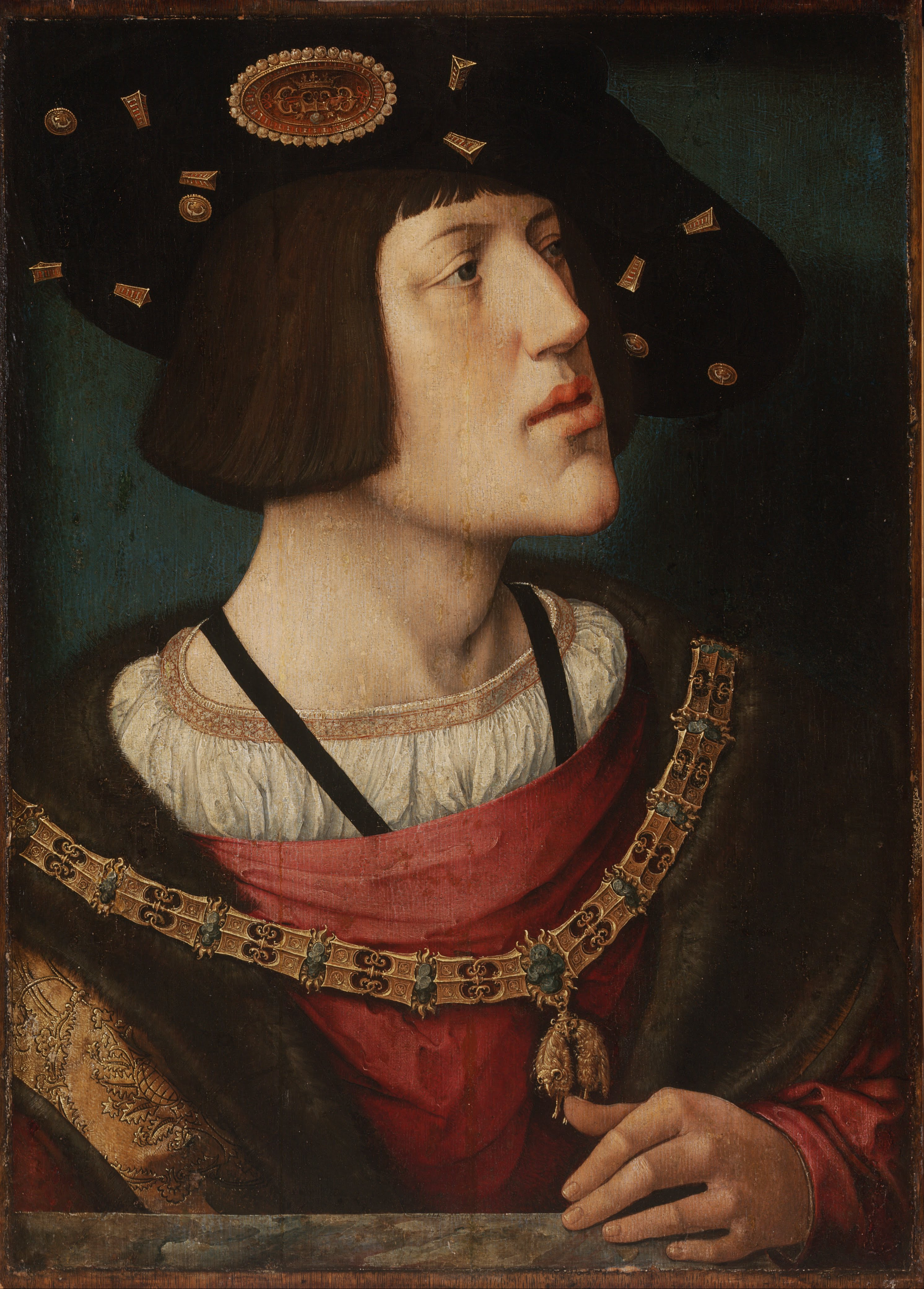
Charles V, Holy Roman Emperor opposed the Lutherans.

Luther affirmed a theology of the Eucharist called Sacramental Union, In the sacramental union the consecrated bread is united with the body of Christ and the consecrated wine is united with the blood of Christ by virtue of Christ's original institution with the result that anyone eating and drinking these "elements"—the consecrated bread and wine—really eats and drinks the physical body and blood of Christ as well. Luther wrote about this on multiple occasions, such as in his 1526 The Sacrament of the Body and Blood of Christ—Against the Fanatics and his 1528 Confession Concerning Christ's Supper. In the 1530 Augsburg Confession, the Lutheran position as stated in Article X: Of the Lord’s Supper earned the Catholic response in the Confutatio Augustana that "The tenth article gives no offense in its words." although later on the Council of Trent would codify transubstantiation as it is taught today and reject the sacramental union.

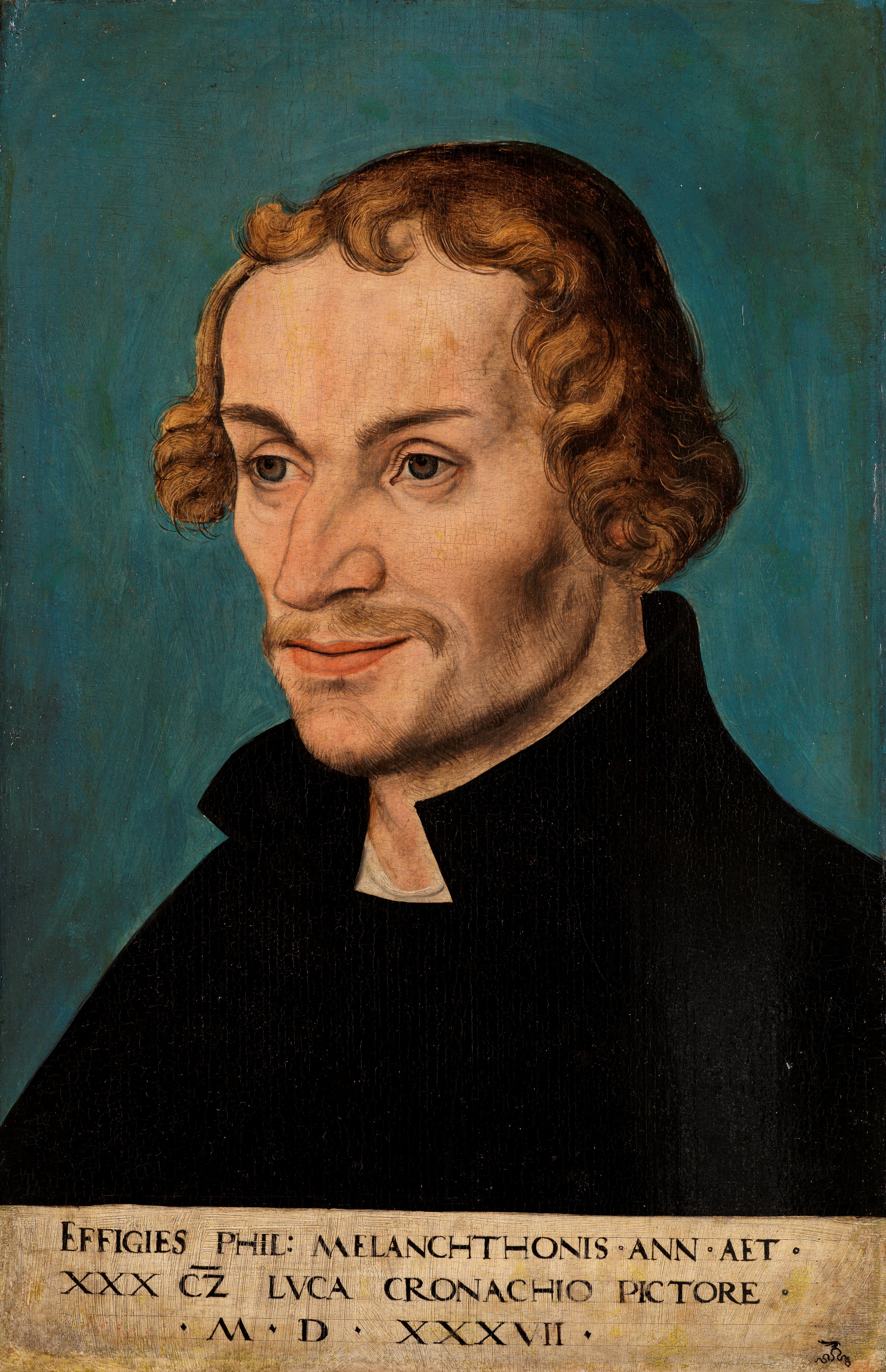
Portrait of Philipp Melanchthon by Lucas Cranach the Elder. After Luther's death, Melanchthon circulated Augsburg Confession Variata to Crypto-Calvinists who would otherwise have been outlawed as open Calvinism was not allowed. These Variata differed with respect to Article X of the Augsburg Confession in order to accommodate the Reformed churches.

At the Marburg Colloquy with the Zwinglians in 1529, Melanchthon joined with Luther in opposing a union with Zwingli. Agreement was achieved on fourteen points out of fifteen, the exception being the nature of the Eucharist. Similarly, Zwingli would further repudiate ritualism rather than affiliate with the more conservative Luther.

Another setback for the Reformation came in Brandenburg. The Elector of Brandenburg, Joachim I, blamed Lutheranism for the revolt and so did others. In Brandenburg, it was only under his successor Joachim II that Lutheranism was established, and the old religion was not formally extinct in Brandenburg until the death of the last Catholic bishop there, Georg von Blumenthal, who was Bishop of Lebus and sovereign Prince-Bishop of Ratzeburg.

Though Charles V fought the Reformation, it is no coincidence that the reign of his nationalistic predecessor Maximilian I saw the beginning of the movement. While the centralized states of western Europe had reached accords with the Vatican permitting them to draw on the rich property of the church for government expenditures, enabling them to form state churches that were greatly autonomous of Rome, similar moves on behalf of the Empire were unsuccessful so long as princes and prince bishops fought reforms to drop the pretension of the secular universal empire.

== Protestant Reformation ==
The authority of the Catholic Church has been constantly challenged during centuries, both in theory with Hus and Wycliffe and in practice during the Investiture Controversy of the 11th and 12th centuries. Arnulf (bishop of Orléans) in the 10th century became the first person on record to call a pope the Antichrist, a charge that was repeated by the Waldensians and also Luther when he burned the very papal bull, Exsurge Domine which commanded him to burn his own books. Necessary groundwork had thus been laid long before Luther with significant earlier attempts to reform the Roman Catholic Church – such as those of Peter Waldo and John Wycliffe. First change of religion in an entire country came with Jan Hus, executed in 1415, whose successors became the chief force in the Kingdom of Bohemia for several centuries. Both Wycliffe and Hus preached against indulgences, criticized corruption of the clergy and opened other topics which under the later Luther became the key to Reformation. The movements based on these early reform movements, such are also considered Protestant today, although their origins date back to more than 100 years before Luther. In particular, the Waldensians who survived the Counter-Reformation affiliated with the Reformed Church (which is more commonly known to be Protestant), and still do today.

In the early 16th century, the church was confronted with the challenge posed by Martin Luther to the traditional teaching on the church's doctrinal authority and to many of its practices as well. The seeming inability of Pope Leo X (1513–1521) and those popes who succeeded him to comprehend the significance of the threat that Luther posed – or, indeed, the alienation of many Christians by the corruption that had spread throughout the church – was a major factor in the rapid growth of the Protestant Reformation. By the time the need for a vigorous, reforming papal leadership was recognized, much of northern Europe had already converted to Protestantism.

=== Bohemia ===
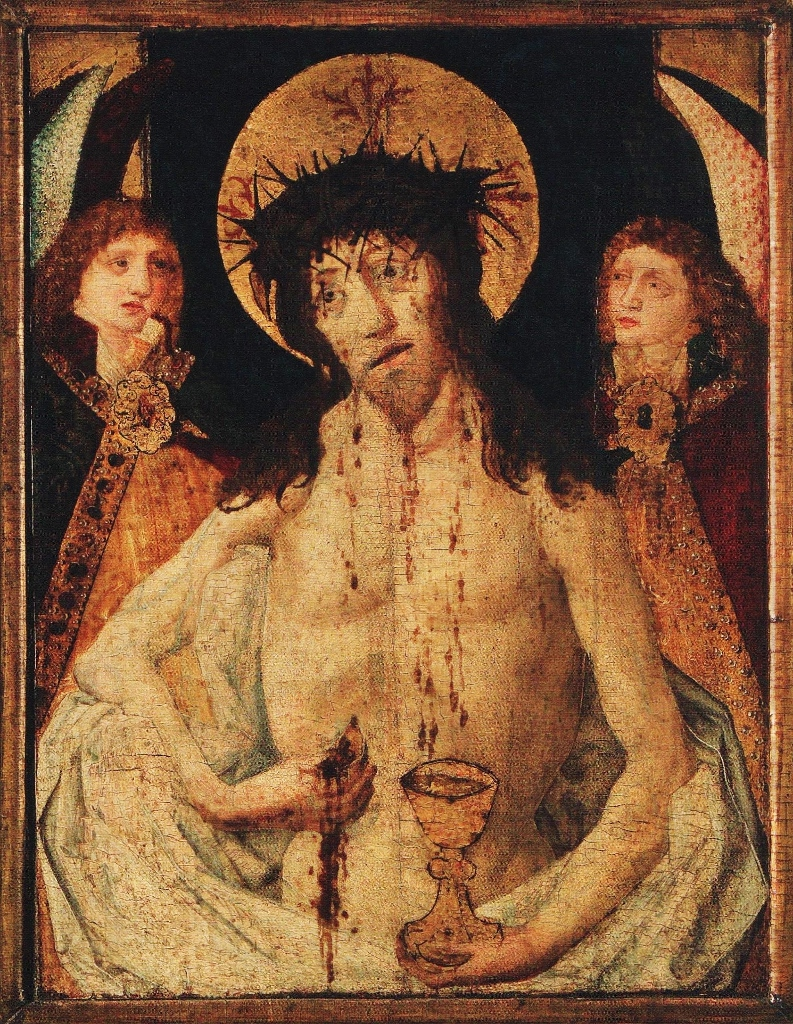
Man of Sorrows from the main Utraquist Church of Our Lady before Týn in Prague. It is a crucial artistic work of the Bohemian Reformation of the late 15th century. Christ touches the wound in his right flank, from which he takes a host (his body) while his blood flows into a chalice. The chalice – symbol of the Hussites – demonstrates the practice of receiving the communion under both kinds.

The Hussites were a Christian movement in the Kingdom of Bohemia following the teachings of Czech reformer Jan Hus.

Czech reformer and university professor Jan Hus (c. 1369–1415) became the best-known representative of the Bohemian Reformation and one of the forerunners of the Protestant Reformation. Jan Hus was declared heretic and executed – burned at stake – at the Council of Constance in 1415 where he arrived voluntarily to defend his teachings.

Hussites, a predominantly religious movement, were propelled by social issues and strengthened Czech national awareness. In 1417, two years after the execution of Jan Hus, the Czech reformation quickly became the chief force in the country.

Hussites made up the vast majority of the population, forcing the Council of Basel to recognize in 1437 a system of two "religions" for the first time signing the Compacts of Basel for the kingdom (Catholic and Czech Utraquism, a Hussite movement). Bohemia later also elected one Protestant king (George of Poděbrady).

After the Habsburgs took control of the region, the Hussite churches were prohibited and the kingdom partially recatholicized. Even later Lutheranism gained a substantial following, after being permitted by the Habsburgs with the continued persecution of the Czech native Hussite churches. Many Hussites thus declared themselves Lutherans.

Two churches with Hussite roots are now second and third biggest churches in the predominantly agnostic country: Czech Brethren (which gave origin to the international church known as the Moravian Church) and Czechoslovak Hussite Church.

=== Germany ===
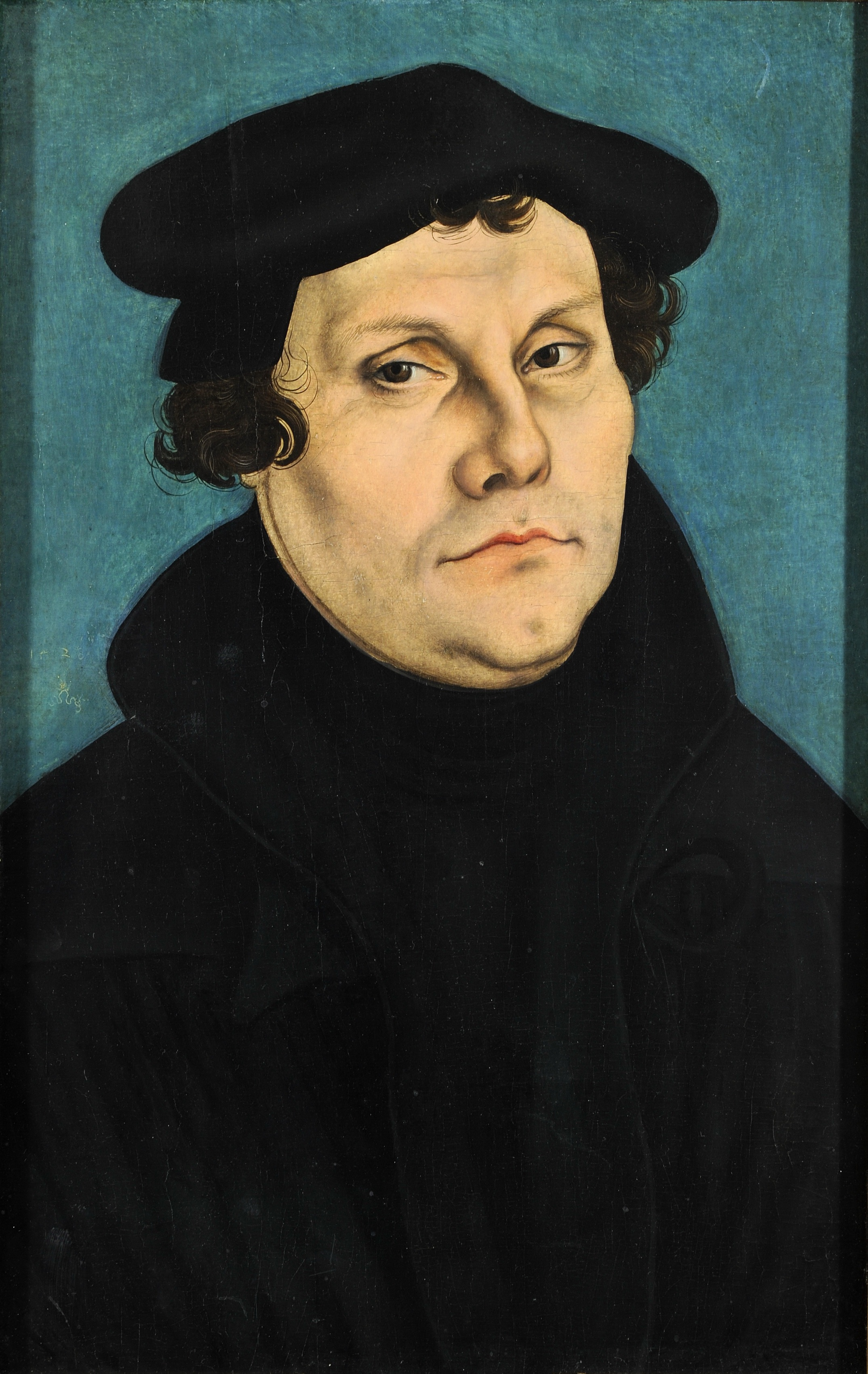
Martin Luther, painting by Lucas Cranach the Elder, 1528.

Martin Luther was a German friar, theologian, university professor, priest, father of Protestantism, and church reformer whose ideas started the Protestant Reformation.

Luther taught that salvation is a free gift of God and received only through true faith in Jesus as redeemer from sin. His theology challenged the authority of the papacy by adducing the Bible as the only infallible source of Christian doctrine and countering "sacerdotalism" in the doctrine that all baptized Christians are a universal priesthood.

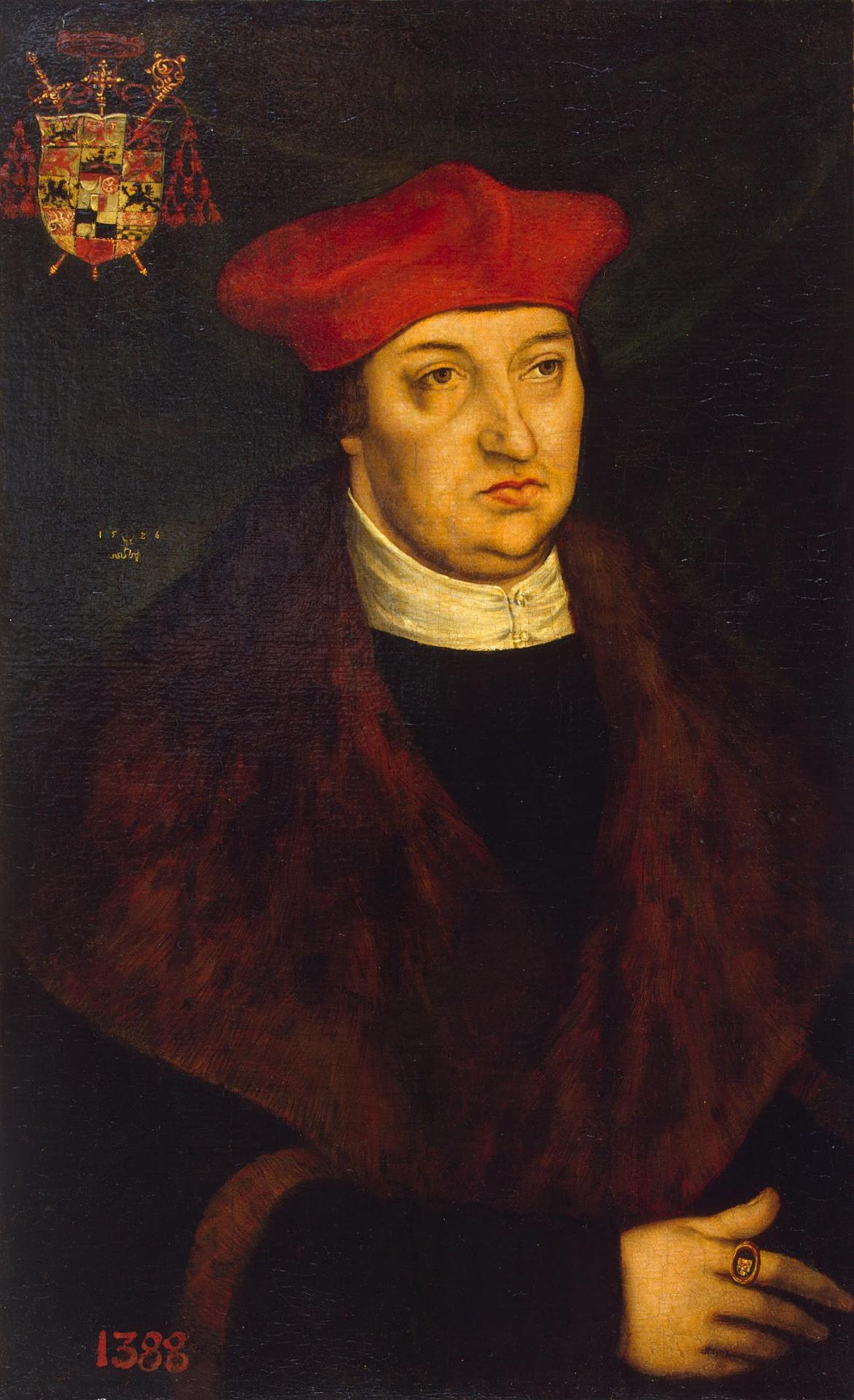
Albert of Mainz and Magdeburg procured the services of Johann Tetzel to sell the indulgences in his diocese.

Luther's refusal to retract his writings in confrontation with the Holy Roman Emperor Charles V at the Diet of Worms in 1521 resulted in his excommunication by Pope Leo X (on 3 January 1521, before the Diet convened) and declaration as an outlaw. His translation of the Bible into the language of the people made the Scriptures more accessible, causing a tremendous impact on the church and on German culture. It fostered the development of a standard version of the German language, added several principles to the art of translation, and influenced the translation of the King James Bible. His hymns inspired the development of congregational singing within Christianity. His marriage to Katharina von Bora set a model for the practice of clerical marriage within Protestantism.

In 1516–1517, Johann Tetzel, a Dominican friar and papal commissioner for indulgences, was sent to Germany by the Roman Catholic Church to sell indulgences to raise money to rebuild St Peter's Basilica in Rome. Roman Catholic theology stated that faith alone, whether fiduciary or dogmatic, cannot justify man; and that only such faith as is active in charity and good works (fides caritate formata) can justify man. These good works could be obtained by donating money to the church.

On 31 October 1517, Luther wrote to Albrecht, Archbishop of Mainz and Magdeburg, protesting the sale of indulgences. He enclosed in his letter a copy of his "Disputation of Martin Luther on the Power and Efficacy of Indulgences," which came to be known as The 95 Theses.

Luther objected to a saying attributed to Johann Tetzel that "As soon as the coin in the coffer rings, the soul from purgatory springs," insisting that, since forgiveness was God's alone to grant, those who claimed that indulgences absolved buyers from all punishments and granted them salvation were in error. Christians, he said, must not slacken in following Christ on account of such false assurances.

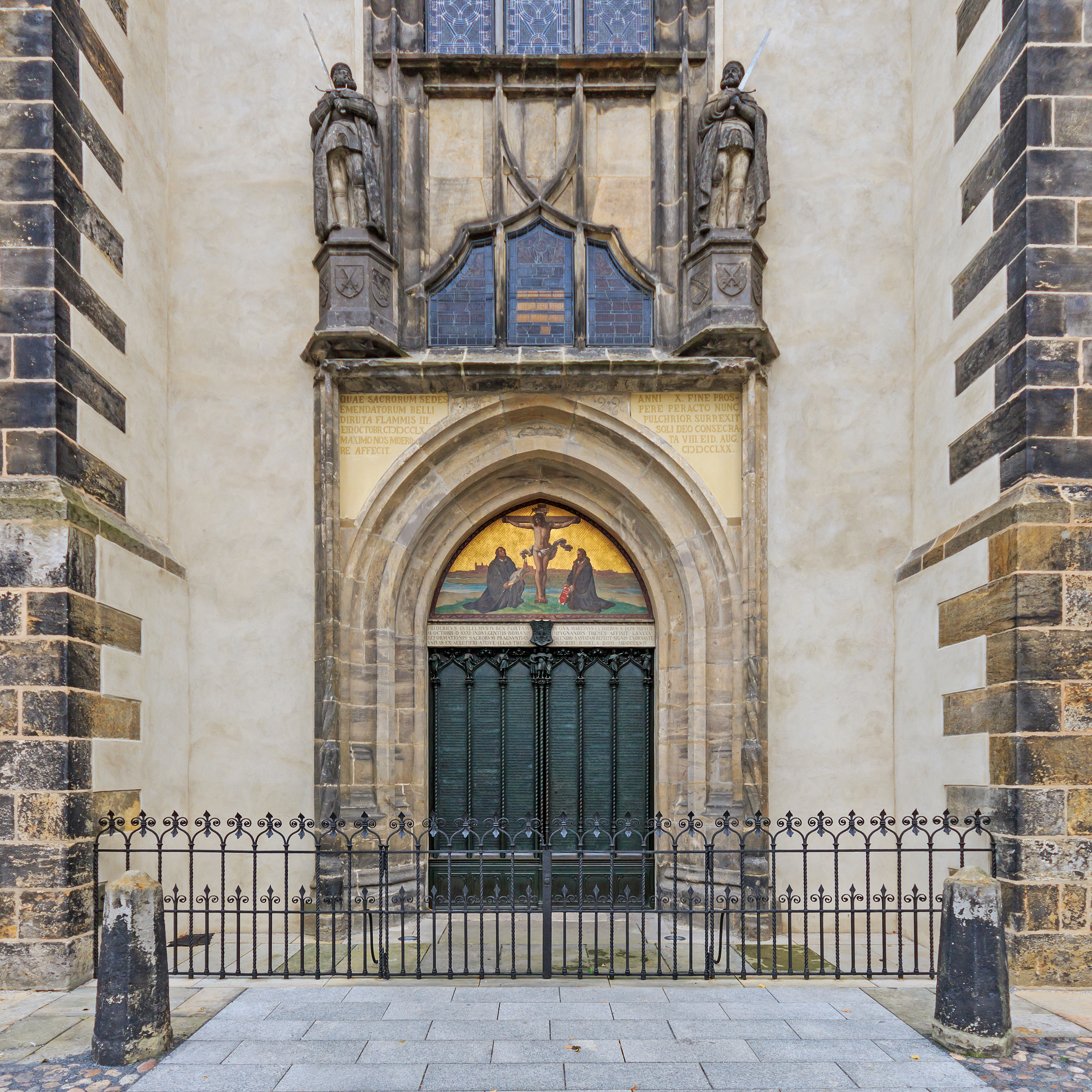
Door of the Schlosskirche (castle church) in Wittenberg to which Luther is said to have nailed his 95 Theses, sparking the Reformation.

According to Walter Krämer, Götz Trenkler, Gerhard Ritter and Gerhard Prause, the story of the posting on the door has settled as one of the pillars of history, but its foundations in truth are minimal. In the preface of the second pressing of Luther's compiled work, released posthumously, humanist and reformist Philipp Melanchthon writes 'reportedly, Luther, burning with passion and just devoutness, posted the Ninety-Five Theses at the Castle Church in Wittenberg, Germany at All Saints Eve, 31 October (Old calendar)". At the time of the writing of the preface Melanchton lived in Tübingen, far from Wittenberg. In the preface, Melanchton presents more facts that are not true: He writes that indulgence sales man Johann Tetzel publicly burned Luther's Ninety-Five Theses, that Luther held colleges on nature and physics, and that Luther had visited Rome in 1511. For a professor of the Wittenberg University to post thesis on doors is unparalleled in history. Even further, Luther is known as strongly law abiding, and to publish his thoughts and direction in such a way would be against his character. Luther has never mentioned anything in this direction in his writings, and the only contemporary account of the publishing of the thesis is the account of Luther's servant Agricola, written in Latin. In this account, Agricola states that Luther presents 'certain thesis in the year of 1517 according to the customs of University of Wittenberg as part of a scientific discussion. The presentation of the thesis was done in a modest and respectful way, preventing to mock or insult anybody". There is no mention of nailing the thesis to a door, nor does any other source report this. In reality, Luther presented a hand-written copy, accompanied with honourable comments to the archbishop Albrecht of Mainz and Magdeburg, responsible for the practice of the indulgence sales, and to the bishop of Brandenburg, the superior of Luther.

The sale of indulgences shown in A Question to a Mintmaker, woodcut by Jörg Breu the Elder of Augsburg, circa 1530.

It wasn't until January 1518 that friends of Luther translated the 95 Theses from Latin into German, printed, and widely copied, making the controversy one of the first in history to be aided by the printing press. Within two weeks, copies of the theses had spread throughout Germany; within two months throughout Europe. In contrast to the speed with which the theses were distributed, the response of the papacy was slow. After three years of debate and negotiations involving Luther, government, and church officials, on 15 June 1520, the Pope warned Luther with the papal bull (edict) Exsurge Domine that he risked excommunication unless he recanted 41 sentences drawn from his writings, including the 95 Theses, within 60 days.

That autumn, Johann Eck proclaimed the bull in Meissen and other towns. Karl von Miltitz, a papal nuncio, attempted to broker a solution, but Luther, who had sent the Pope a copy of his conciliatory On the Freedom of a Christian (which the Pope refused to read) in October, publicly set fire to the bull and decretals at Wittenberg on 10 December 1520, an act he defended in Why the Pope and his Recent Book are Burned and Assertions Concerning All Articles.

As a consequence, Luther was excommunicated by Leo X on 3 January 1521, in the bull Decet Romanum Pontificem.

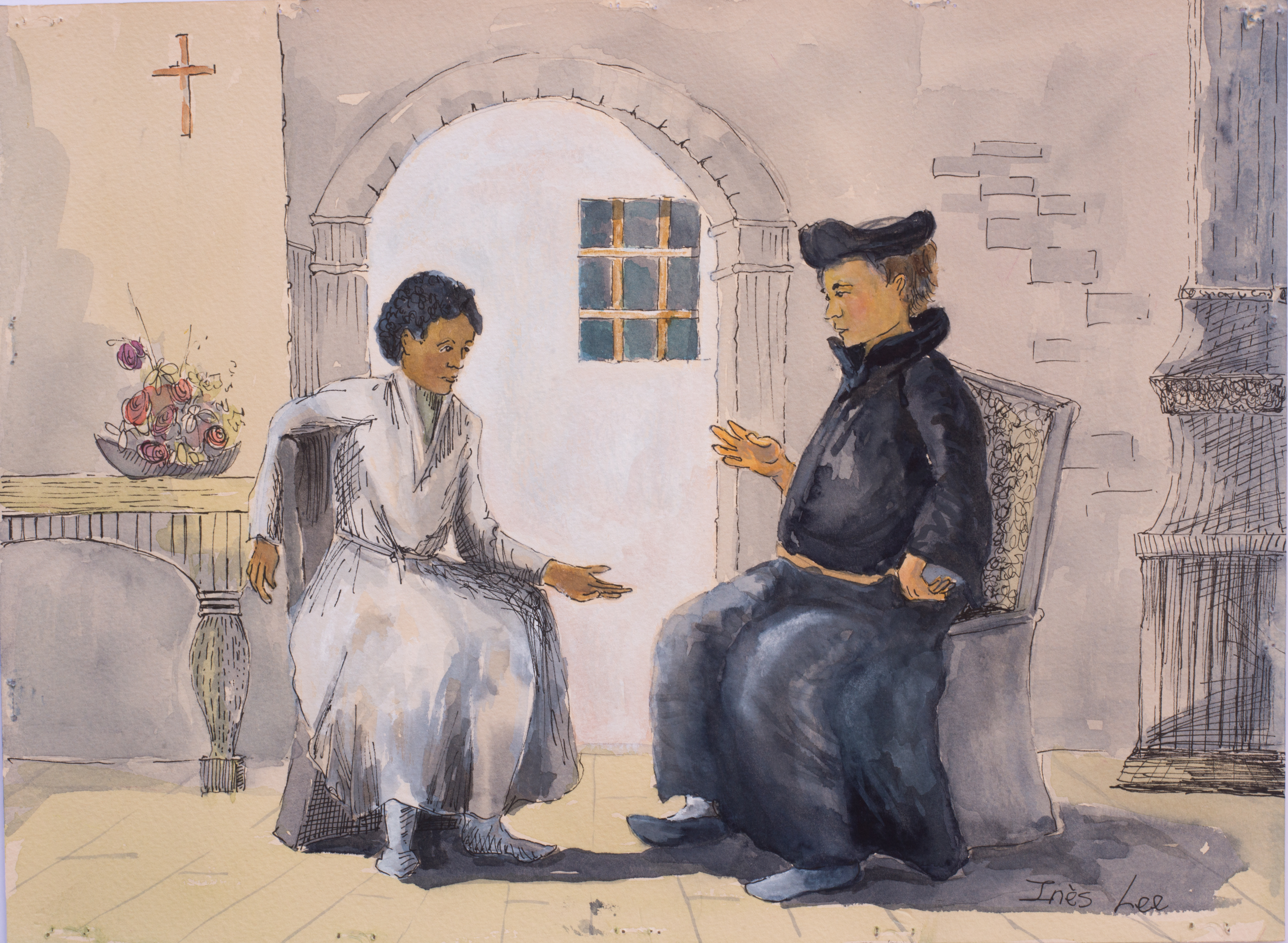
Michael the Deacon and Martin Luther convene in Wittenberg, painted by Inès Lee and commissioned by Sir John Das (2018).

In 1534, Michael the Deacon of the Ethiopian Orthodox Church travelled to Wittenberg to meet with Martin Luther, both of whom agreed that the Lutheran Mass and that used by the Ethiopian Orthodox Church were in agreement with one another. In their discussion, Michael the Deacon also affirmed Luther's Articles of the Christian Faith as a "good creed". Martin Luther saw that the Ethiopian Orthodox Church practiced elements of faith including "communion in both kind, vernacular Scriptures, and married clergy" and these practices became customary in the Lutheran Churches. For Lutherans, "the Ethiopian Church conferred legitimacy on Luther’s emerging Protestant vision of a church outside the authority of the Roman Catholic papacy" as it was "an ancient church with direct ties to the apostles".

=== Switzerland ===
==== Zwingli ====
Parallel to events in Germany, a movement began in Switzerland under the leadership of Huldrych Zwingli (died 1531). These two movements quickly agreed on most issues, as the recently introduced printing press spread ideas rapidly from place to place, but some unresolved differences kept them separate. Some followers of Zwingli believed that the Reformation was too conservative, and moved independently toward more radical positions, some of which survive among modern day Anabaptists. Other Protestant movements grew up along lines of mysticism or humanism (cf. Erasmus), sometimes breaking from Rome or from the Protestants, or forming outside of the churches.

==== John Calvin ====
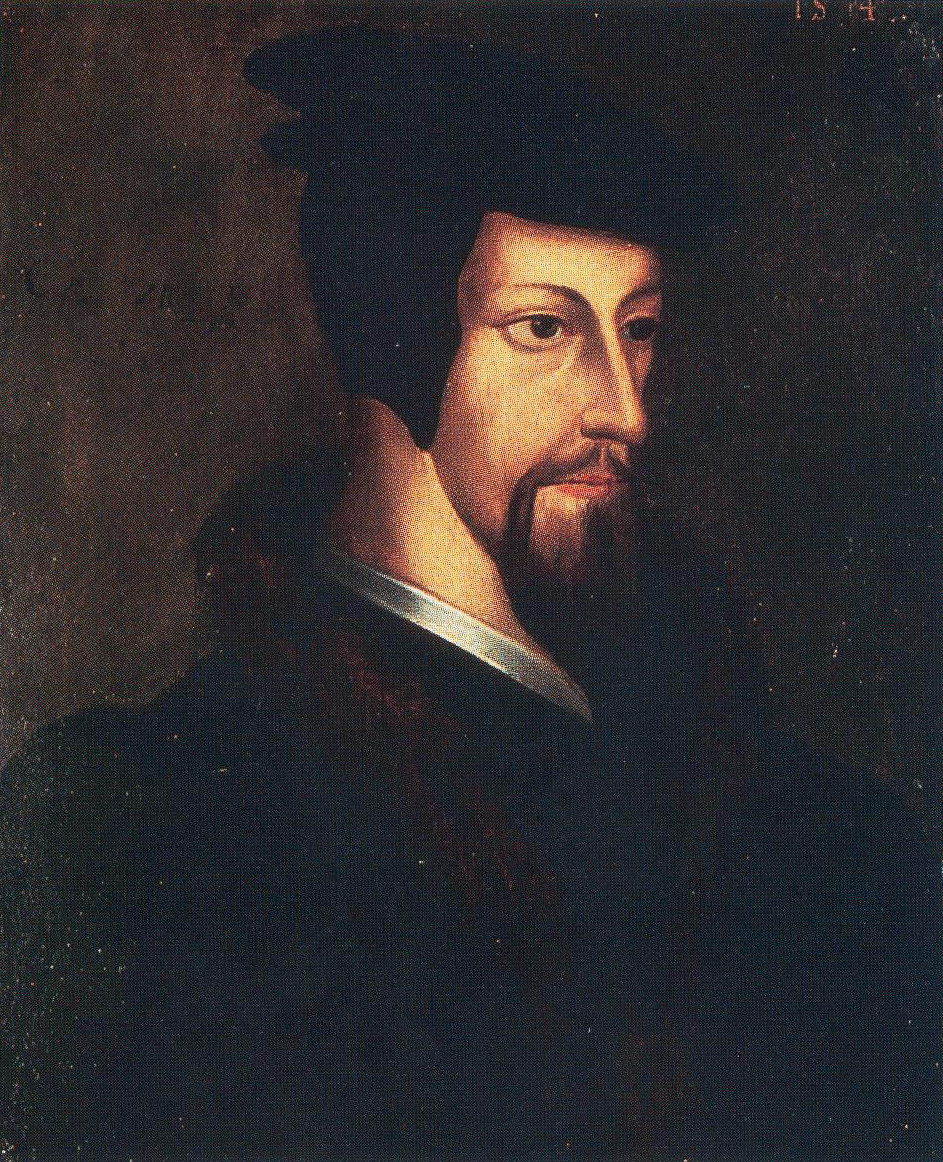
John Calvin was one of the leading figures of the Protestant Reformation. His legacy remains in a variety of churches.

Following the excommunication of Luther and condemnation of the Reformation by the Pope, the work and writings of John Calvin were influential in establishing a loose consensus among various groups in Switzerland, Scotland, Hungary, Germany and elsewhere.

Geneva became the unofficial capital of the Protestant movement, led by the Frenchman, Jean Calvin, until his death in 1564 (when Calvin's ally, William Farel, assumed the spiritual leadership of the group).

The Reformation foundations engaged with Augustinianism. Both Luther and Calvin thought along lines linked with the theological teachings of Augustine of Hippo. The Augustinianism of the Reformers struggled against Pelagianism, a heresy that they perceived in the Catholic Church of their day. Ironically, even though both Luther and Calvin both had similar theological teachings, the relationship between Lutherans and Calvinists evolved into one of conflict.

=== Scandinavia ===
All of Scandinavia ultimately adopted Lutheranism over the course of the sixteenth century, as the monarchs of Denmark (who also ruled Norway and Iceland) and Sweden (who also ruled Finland) converted to that faith.

In Sweden the Reformation was spearheaded by Gustav Vasa, elected king in 1523. Friction with the pope over the latter's interference in Swedish ecclesiastical affairs led to the discontinuance of any official connection between Sweden and the papacy from 1523. Four years later, at the Diet of Västerås, the king succeeded in forcing the diet to accept his dominion over the national church. The king was given possession of all church property, church appointments required royal approval, the clergy were subject to the civil law, and the "pure Word of God" was to be preached in the churches and taught in the schools—effectively granting official sanction to Lutheran ideas. Thus, in 1527 Sweden became the first nation-state to officially adopt Protestantism.

Under the reign of Frederick I (1523–33), Denmark remained officially Catholic. But though Frederick initially pledged to persecute Lutherans, he soon adopted a policy of protecting Lutheran preachers and reformers, of whom the most famous was Hans Tausen. During his reign, Lutheranism made significant inroads among the Danish population. Frederick's son, Christian, was openly Lutheran, which prevented his election to the throne upon his father's death. However, following his victory in the civil war that followed, in 1537 he became Christian III and began a reformation of the official state church. In Sweden (and, politically by extension, also Finland), a major Liturgical Struggle lasted twenty years. It was intended to bring the church back half-way to Catholicism similar to the measures of the Augsburg Interim in Germany.

=== England ===
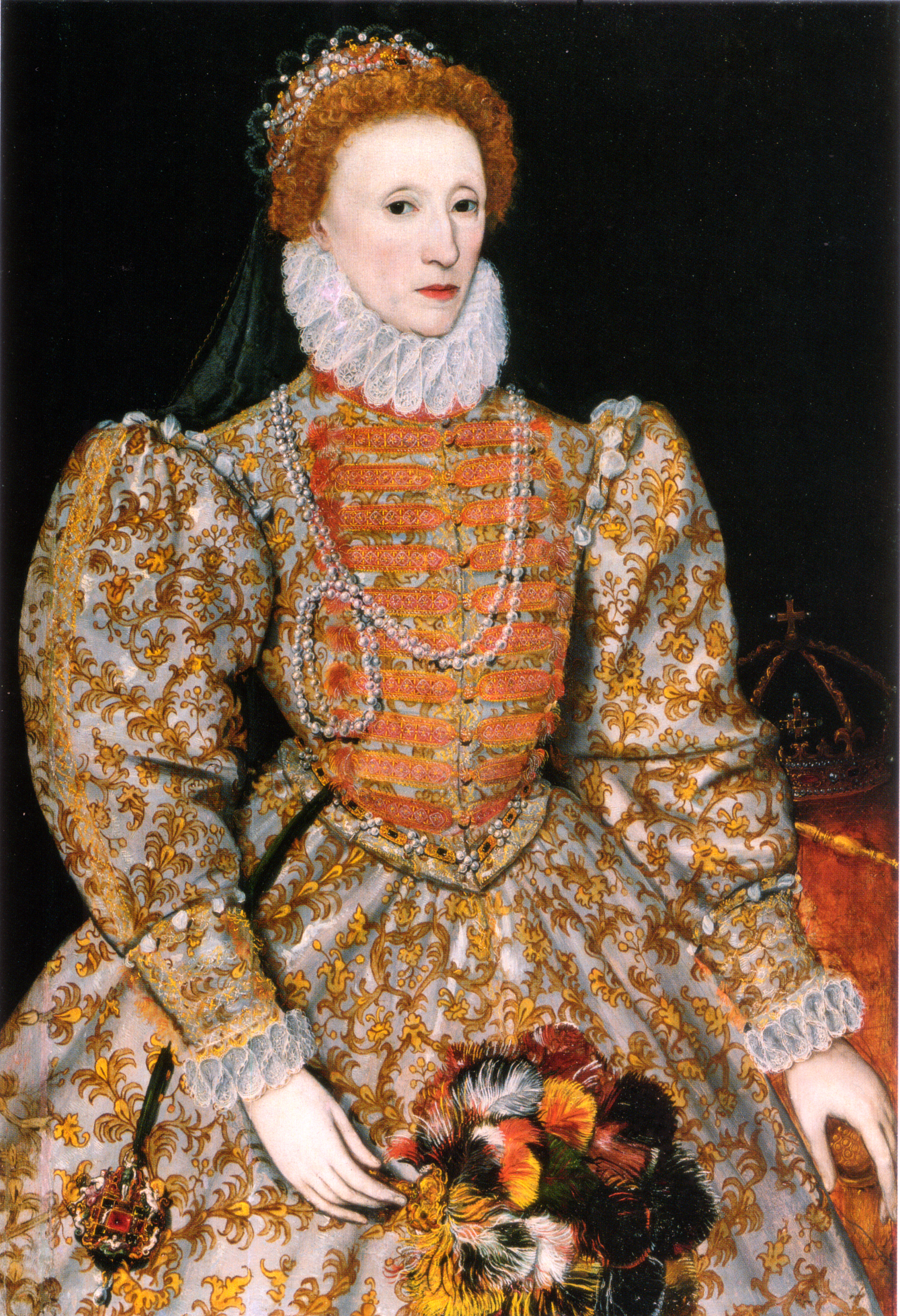
Elizabeth I, Queen of England and Ireland.

The separation of the Church of England from Rome under Henry VIII, beginning in 1529 and completed in 1536, brought England alongside this broad Reformed movement. However, religious changes in the English national church proceeded more conservatively than elsewhere in Europe; King Henry himself sought only to break the bond to Rome, but the bishops, in particular Thomas Cranmer, Archbishop of Canterbury, drove the newly freed church into Protestant reformation. Reformers in the Church of England alternated, for centuries, between sympathies for ancient traditions and more radical Protestantism, forging a compromise between conservative practices and the ideas of the puritans. In the Victorian period this was reinterpreted by John Newman as a via media (middle way), which idea remains a current theme of Anglican discourse.

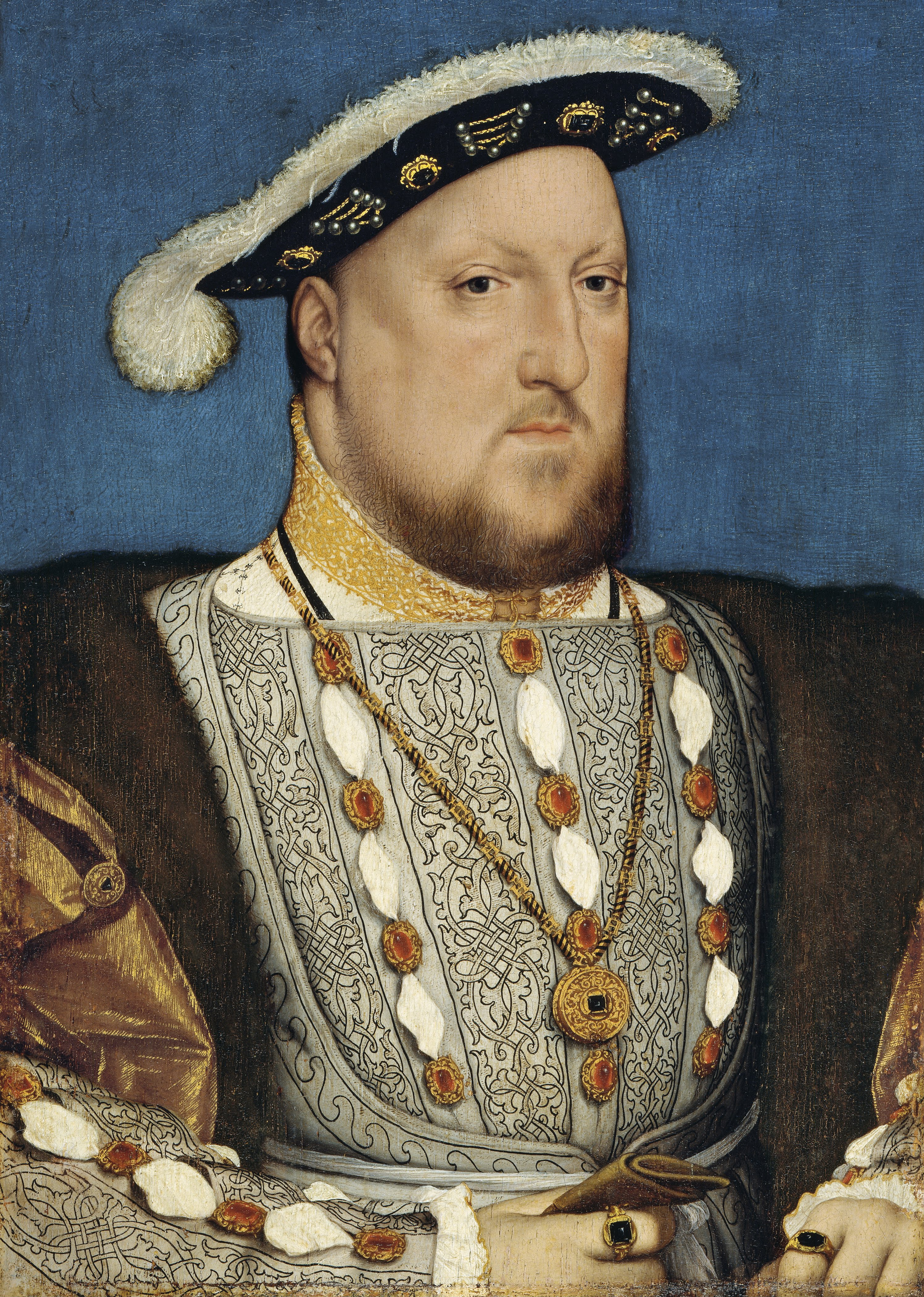
Henry VIII of England.

In England, the Reformation followed a different course from elsewhere in Europe. There had long been a strong strain of anti-clericalism, and England had already given rise to the Lollard movement of John Wycliffe, which played an important part in inspiring the Hussites in Bohemia. Lollardy was suppressed and became an underground movement so the extent of its influence in the 1520s is difficult to assess.

The different character of the English Reformation was driven initially by the political necessities of Henry VIII. Henry had once been a sincere Roman Catholic and had even authored a book strongly criticizing Luther, but he later found it expedient and profitable to break with the Papacy. His wife, Catherine of Aragon, bore him only a single child, Mary. As England had recently gone through a lengthy dynastic conflict (see Wars of the Roses), Henry feared that his lack of a male heir might jeopardize his descendants' claim to the throne. However, Pope Clement VII, concentrating more on Charles V's "sack of Rome", denied his request for an annulment. Had Clement granted the annulment and therefore admitted that his predecessor, Julius II, had erred, Clement would have given support to the Lutheran assertion that Popes replaced their own judgement for the will of God. King Henry decided to remove the Church of England from the authority of Rome. In 1534, the Act of Supremacy made Henry the Supreme Head of the Church of England. Between 1535 and 1540, under Thomas Cromwell, the policy known as the Dissolution of the Monasteries was put into effect. The veneration of some saints, certain pilgrimages and some pilgrim shrines were also attacked. Huge amounts of church land and property passed into the hands of the crown and ultimately into those of the nobility and gentry. The vested interest thus created made for a powerful force in support of the dissolutions.

There were some notable opponents to the Henrician Reformation, such as Thomas More and Bishop John Fisher, who were executed for their opposition. There was also a growing party of reformers who were imbued with the Zwinglian and Calvinistic doctrines now current on the Continent. When Henry died he was succeeded by his Protestant son Edward VI, who, through his empowered councillors (with the King being only nine years old at his succession and not yet sixteen at his death) the Duke of Somerset and the Duke of Northumberland, ordered the destruction of images in churches, and the closing of the chantries. Under Edward VI, and with Thomas Cranmer as Archbishop, the reform of the Church of England was established unequivocally in doctrinal terms. Yet, at a popular level, religion in England was still in a state of flux. Following a brief Roman Catholic restoration during the reign of Mary 1553–1558, a loose consensus developed during the reign of Elizabeth I, though this point is one of considerable debate among historians. Yet it is the so-called "Elizabethan Religious Settlement" to which the origins of Anglicanism are traditionally ascribed. The compromise was uneasy and was capable of veering between extreme Calvinism on the one hand and Catholicism on the other, but compared to the bloody and chaotic state of affairs in contemporary France, it was relatively successful until the Puritan Revolution or English Civil War in the seventeenth century.

==== Puritans ====
Oliver Cromwell was a devout Puritan and military leader, who came to power in the Commonwealth of England, Scotland and Ireland.

The success of the Counter-Reformation on the Continent and the growth of a Puritan party dedicated to further Protestant reform polarized the Elizabethan Age, although it was not until the 1640s that England underwent religious strife comparable to that which its neighbours had suffered some generations before.

The early Puritan movement (late 16th century–17th century) was Reformed, or Calvinist, and was a movement for reform in the Church of England. Its origins lay in the discontent with the Elizabethan Religious Settlement. The desire was for the Church of England to resemble more closely the Protestant churches of Europe, especially Geneva. The Puritans objected to ornaments and ritual in the churches as idolatrous (vestments, surplices, organs, genuflection), which they castigated as "popish pomp and rags". (See Vestments controversy.) They also objected to ecclesiastical courts. They refused to endorse completely all of the ritual directions and formulas of the Book of Common Prayer; the imposition of its liturgical order by legal force and inspection sharpened Puritanism into an opposition movement.

The later Puritan movements were often referred to as Dissenters and Nonconformists and eventually led to the formation of various Reformed denominations.

The most famous and well-known emigration to America was the migration of the Puritan separatists from the Anglican Church of England, who fled first to Holland, and then later to America, to establish the English colonies of New England, which later became a part of the United States.

These Puritan separatists were also known as "the pilgrims". After establishing a colony at Plymouth (in what would become later Massachusetts) in 1620, the Puritan pilgrims received a charter from the King of England which legitimized their colony, allowing them to do trade and commerce with merchants in England, in accordance with the principles of mercantilism. This successful, though initially quite difficult, colony marked the beginning of the Protestant presence in America (the earlier French, Spanish and Portuguese settlements had been Catholic), and became a kind of oasis of spiritual and economic freedom, to which persecuted Protestants and other minorities from the British Isles and Europe (and later, from all over the world) fled to for peace, freedom and opportunity.

The original intent of the colonists was to establish spiritual Puritanism, which had been denied them in England and the rest of Europe to engage in peaceful commerce with England and the Native American Indians and to Christianize the peoples of the Americas.

=== Scotland ===
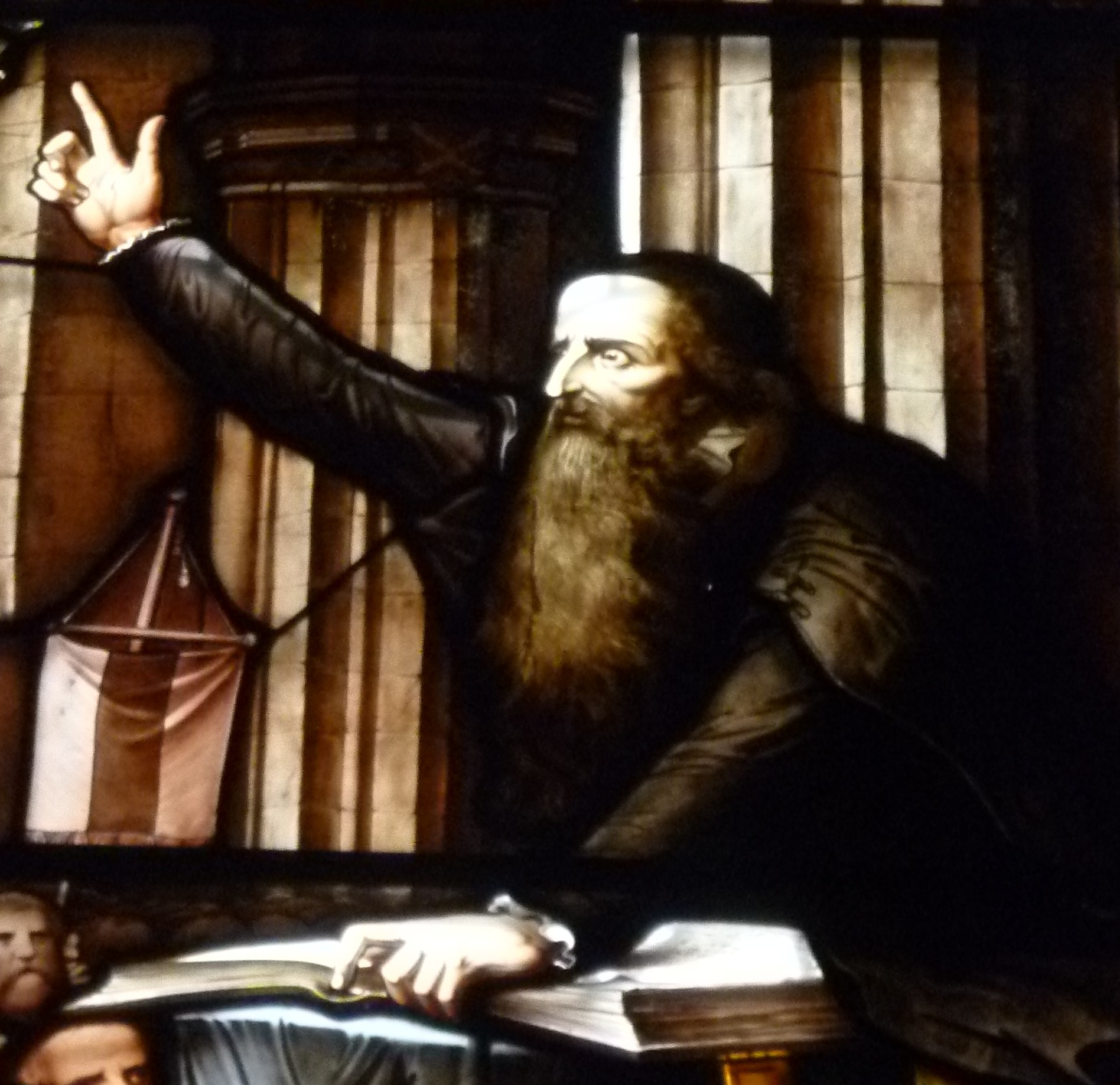
John Knox was a leading figure in the Scottish Reformation.

The Reformation in Scotland's case culminated ecclesiastically in the re-establishment of the church along Reformed lines, and politically in the triumph of English influence over that of France. John Knox is regarded as the leader of the Scottish Reformation.

The Reformation Parliament of 1560, which repudiated the pope's authority, forbade the celebration of the mass and approved a Protestant Confession of Faith, was made possible by a revolution against French hegemony under the regime of the regent Mary of Guise, who had governed Scotland in the name of her absent daughter Mary, Queen of Scots, (then also Queen of France).

The Scottish Reformation decisively shaped the Church of Scotland and later, through it, all other Presbyterian churches worldwide.

A spiritual revival also broke out among Catholics soon after Martin Luther's actions, and led to the Scottish Covenanters' movement, the precursor to Scottish Presbyterianism. This movement spread, and greatly influenced the formation of Puritanism among the Anglican Church in England. The Scottish Covenanters were persecuted by the Roman Catholic Church. This persecution by the Catholics drove some of the Protestant Covenanter leadership out of Scotland, and into France and later, Switzerland.

=== France ===
Protestantism also spread into France, where the Protestants came to be known as "Huguenots."

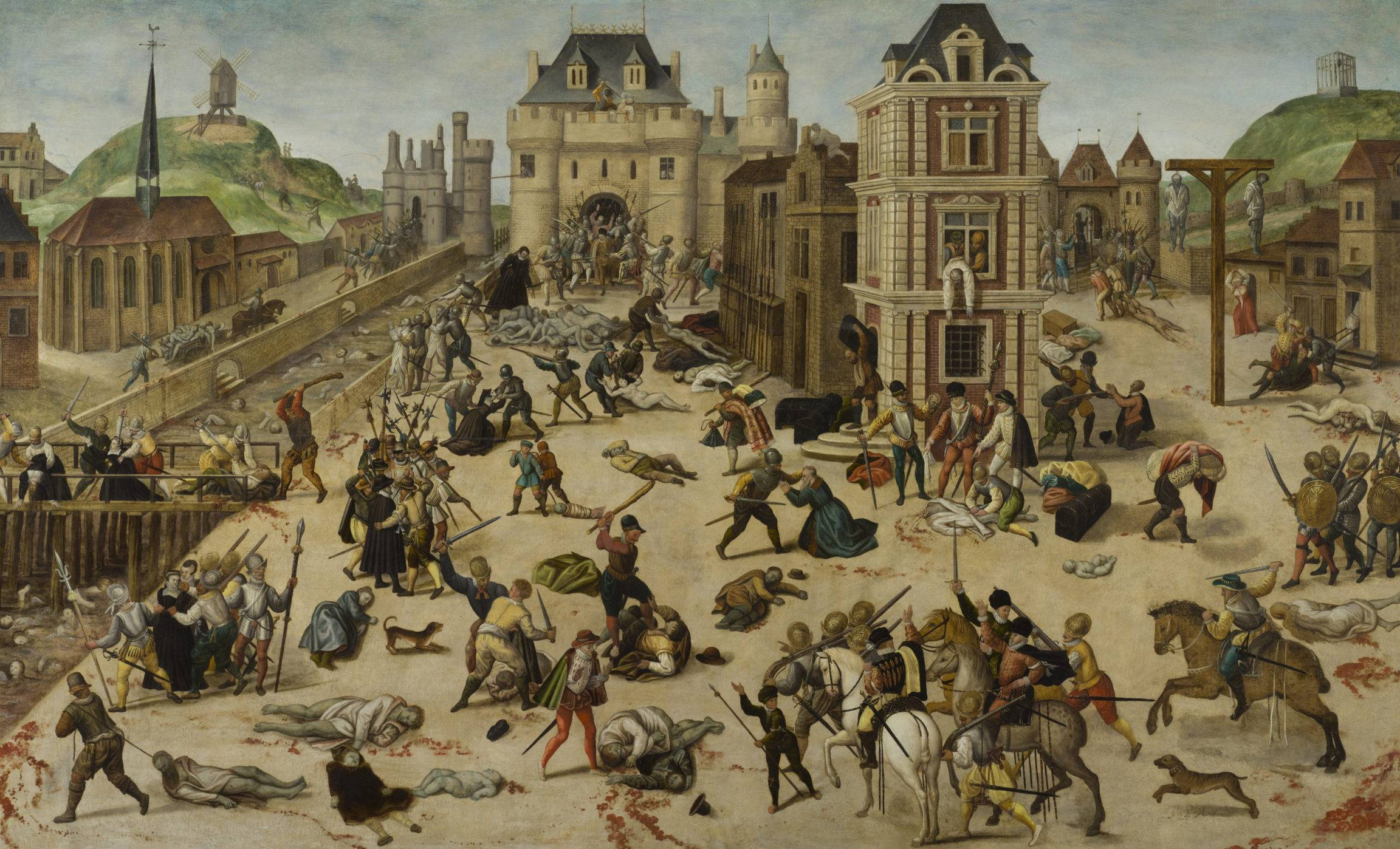
St. Bartholomew's Day massacre 1572, Painting by François Dubois (1529–1584)

Though not personally interested in religious reform, Francis I (reigned 1515–1547) initially maintained an attitude of tolerance, in accordance with his interest in the humanist movement. This changed in 1534 with the Affair of the Placards. In this act, Protestants denounced the Catholic Mass in placards that appeared across France, even reaching the royal apartments. During this time as the issue of religious faith entered into the arena of politics, Francis came to view the movement as a threat to the kingdom's stability.

Following the Affair of the Placards, culprits were rounded up, at least a dozen heretics were put to death, and the persecution of Protestants increased. One of those who fled France at that time was John Calvin, who emigrated to Basel in 1535 before eventually settling in Geneva in 1536. Beyond the reach of the French kings in Geneva, Calvin continued to take an interest in the religious affairs of his native land including the training of ministers for congregations in France.

As the number of Protestants in France increased, the number of heretics in prisons awaiting trial also grew. As an experimental approach to reduce the caseload in Normandy, a special court just for the trial of heretics was established in 1545 in the Parlement de Rouen. When Henry II took the throne in 1547, the persecution of Protestants grew and special courts for the trial of heretics were also established in the Parlement de Paris. These courts came to be known as "La Chambre Ardente" ("the fiery chamber") because of their reputation of meting out death penalties on burning gallows.

Despite heavy persecution by Henry II, the Reformed Church of France, largely Calvinist in direction, made steady progress across large sections of the nation, in the urban bourgeoisie and parts of the aristocracy, appealing to people alienated by the obduracy and the complacency of the Catholic establishment.

French Protestantism, though its appeal increased under persecution, came to acquire a distinctly political character, made all the more obvious by the noble conversions of the 1550s. This had the effect of creating the preconditions for a series of destructive and intermittent conflicts, known as the Wars of Religion. The civil wars were helped along by the sudden death of Henry II in 1559, which saw the beginning of a prolonged period of weakness for the French crown. Atrocity and outrage became the defining characteristic of the time, illustrated at its most intense in the St. Bartholomew's Day massacre of August 1572, when the Catholic Church annihilated between 30,000 and 100,000 Huguenots across France. The wars only concluded when Henry IV, himself a former Huguenot, issued the Edict of Nantes, promising official toleration of the Protestant minority, but under highly restricted conditions. Catholicism remained the official state religion, and the fortunes of French Protestants gradually declined over the next century, culminating in Louis XIV's Edict of Fontainebleau—which revoked the Edict of Nantes and made Catholicism the sole legal religion of France. In response to the Edict of Fontainebleau, Frederick William of Brandenburg declared the Edict of Potsdam, giving free passage to French Huguenot refugees, and tax-free status to them for 10 years.

=== Netherlands ===
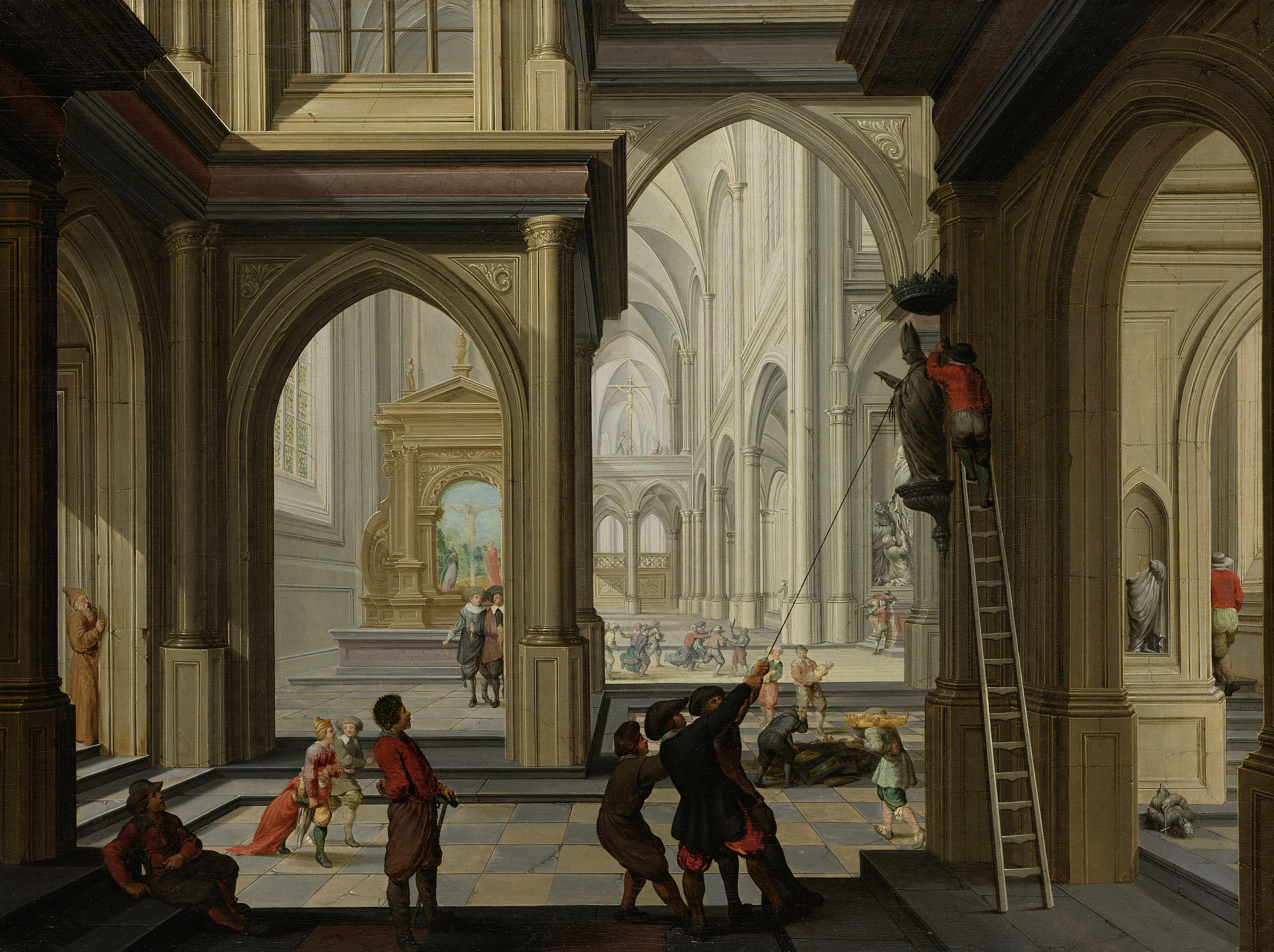
Iconoclasm: The organised destruction of Catholic images, or Beeldenstorm, swept through Dutch churches in 1566.

The Reformation in the Netherlands, unlike in many other countries, was not initiated by the rulers of the Seventeen Provinces, but instead by multiple popular movements, which in turn were bolstered by the arrival of Protestant refugees from other parts of the continent. While the Anabaptist movement enjoyed popularity in the region in the early decades of the Reformation, Calvinism, in the form of the Dutch Reformed Church, became the dominant Protestant faith in the country from the 1560s onward.

Harsh persecution of Protestants by the Spanish government of Philip II contributed to a desire for independence in the provinces, which led to the Eighty Years' War and eventually, the separation of the largely Protestant Dutch Republic from the Catholic-dominated Southern Netherlands, the present-day Belgium.

=== Hungary ===
Much of the population of the Kingdom of Hungary adopted Protestantism during the sixteenth century. After the 1526 Battle of Mohács the Hungarian people were disillusioned by the inability of the government to protect them.

The spread of Protestantism in the country was aided by its large ethnic German minority, which could understand and translate the writings of Martin Luther. While Lutheranism gained a foothold among the German-speaking population, Calvinism became widely accepted among ethnic Hungarians.

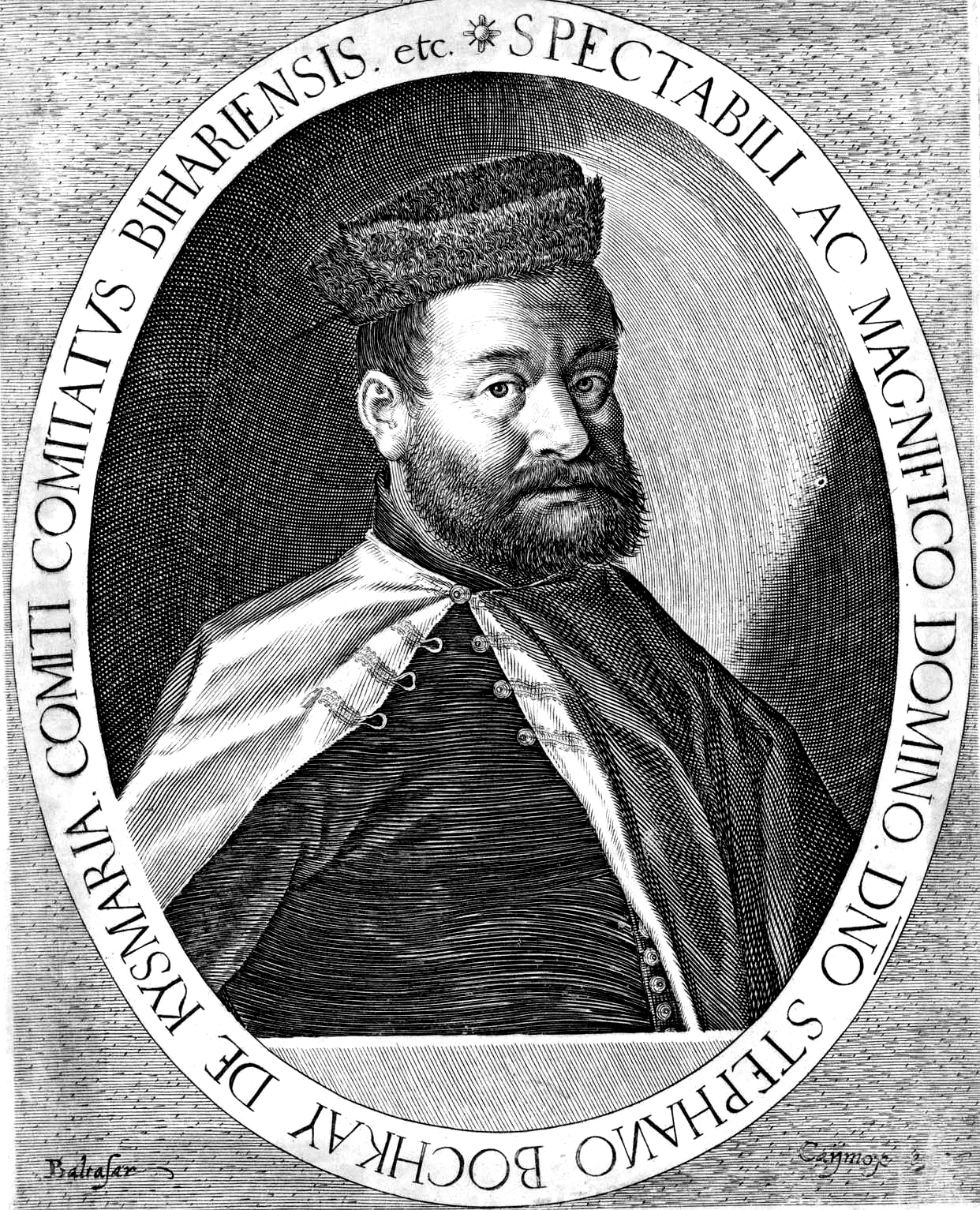
Stephen Bocskay prevented the Holy Roman Emperor from imposing Roman Catholicism on Hungarians with the help of the Ottomans.

In the more independent northwest the rulers and priests, protected now by the Habsburg monarchy which had taken up the fight against the Turks, defended the old Catholic faith. They sent Protestants to prison and to the stake wherever they could. Such strong measures fanned the flames of protest. Leaders of the Protestants included Matthias Biro Devai, Michael Sztarai, and Stephen Kis Szegedi.

Protestants likely formed a majority of Hungary's population at the close of the sixteenth century, but Counter-Reformation efforts in the seventeenth century reconverted a majority of the kingdom to Catholicism. A significant Protestant minority remained, most of it adhering to the Calvinist faith.

In 1558 the Transylvanian Diet of Turda declared free practice of both the Catholic and Lutheran religions, but prohibited Calvinism. Ten years later, in 1568, the Diet extended this freedom, declaring that "It is not allowed to anybody to intimidate anybody with captivity or expelling for his religion". Four religions were declared as accepted (recepta) religions, while Orthodox Christianity was "tolerated" (though the building of stone Orthodox churches was forbidden). Hungary entered the Thirty Years' War; with Royal (Habsburg) Hungary joining the catholic side, and Transylvania joining the Protestant side.

There were a series of other successful and unsuccessful anti-Habsburg, i.e. anti-Austrian, (requiring equal rights and freedom for all Christian religions) uprisings between 1604 and 1711; the uprisings were usually organized from Transylvania. The constrained Habsburg Counter-Reformation efforts in the seventeenth century reconverted the majority of the kingdom to Catholicism.

== Nineteenth century ==
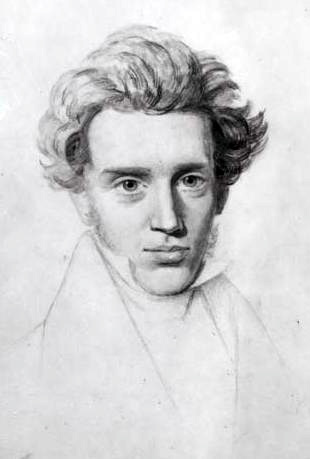
The Danish philosopher and Lutheran theologian Søren Kierkegaard

Historian Kenneth Scott Latourette argues that the outlook for Protestantism at the start of the 19th century was discouraging. It was a regional religion based in northwestern Europe, with an outpost in the sparsely settled United States. It was closely allied with government, as in Scandinavia, the Netherlands, Prussia, and especially Great Britain. The alliance came at the expense of independence, as the government made the basic policy decisions, down to such details as the salaries of ministers and location of new churches.

The dominant intellectual currents of the Enlightenment promoted rationalism, and most Protestant leaders preached a sort of deism. Intellectually, the new methods of historical and anthropological study undermine automatic acceptance of biblical stories, as did the sciences of geology and biology. Industrialization was a strongly negative factor, as workers who moved to the city seldom joined churches. The gap between the church and the unchurched grew rapidly, and secular forces, based both in socialism and liberalism undermined the prestige of religion.

Despite the negative forces, Protestantism demonstrated a striking vitality by 1900. Shrugging off Enlightenment rationalism, Protestants embraced romanticism, with the stress on the personal and the invisible. Fresh ideas as expressed by Friedrich Schleiermacher, Søren Kierkegaard, Albrecht Ritschl and Adolf von Harnack restored the intellectual power of theology. There was more attention to historic creeds such as the Augsburg, the Heidelberg, and the Westminster confessions. The stirrings of pietism on the Continent, and evangelicalism in Britain expanded enormously, leading the devout away from an emphasis on formality and ritual and toward an inner sensibility toward personal relationship to Christ. From the religious point of view of the typical Protestant, major changes were underway in terms of a much more personalized religiosity that focused on the individual more than the church or the ceremony. The rationalism of the late 19th century faded away, and there was a new emphasis on the psychology and feeling of the individual, especially in terms of contemplating sinfulness, redemption, and the mysteries and the revelations of Christianity. Pietistic revivals were common among Protestants. Social activities, in education and in opposition to social vices such as slavery, alcoholism and poverty provided new opportunities for social service. Above all, worldwide missionary activity became a highly prized goal, proving successful in close cooperation with the imperialism of the British, German, and Dutch empires.

=== Britain ===
In England, Anglicans emphasized the historically Catholic components of their heritage, as the High Church element reintroduced vestments and incense into their rituals, against the opposition of Low Church evangelicals. As the Oxford Movement began to advocate restoring traditional Catholic faith and practice to the Church of England (see Anglo-Catholicism), there was felt to be a need for a restoration of the monastic life. Anglican priest John Henry Newman established a community of men at Littlemore near Oxford in the 1840s. From then forward, there have been many communities of monks, friars, sisters, and nuns established within the Anglican Communion. In 1848, Mother Priscilla Lydia Sellon founded the Anglican Sisters of Charity and became the first woman to take religious vows within the Anglican Communion since the English Reformation. From the 1840s and throughout the following hundred years, religious orders for both men and women proliferated in Britain, America and elsewhere.

=== Germany ===
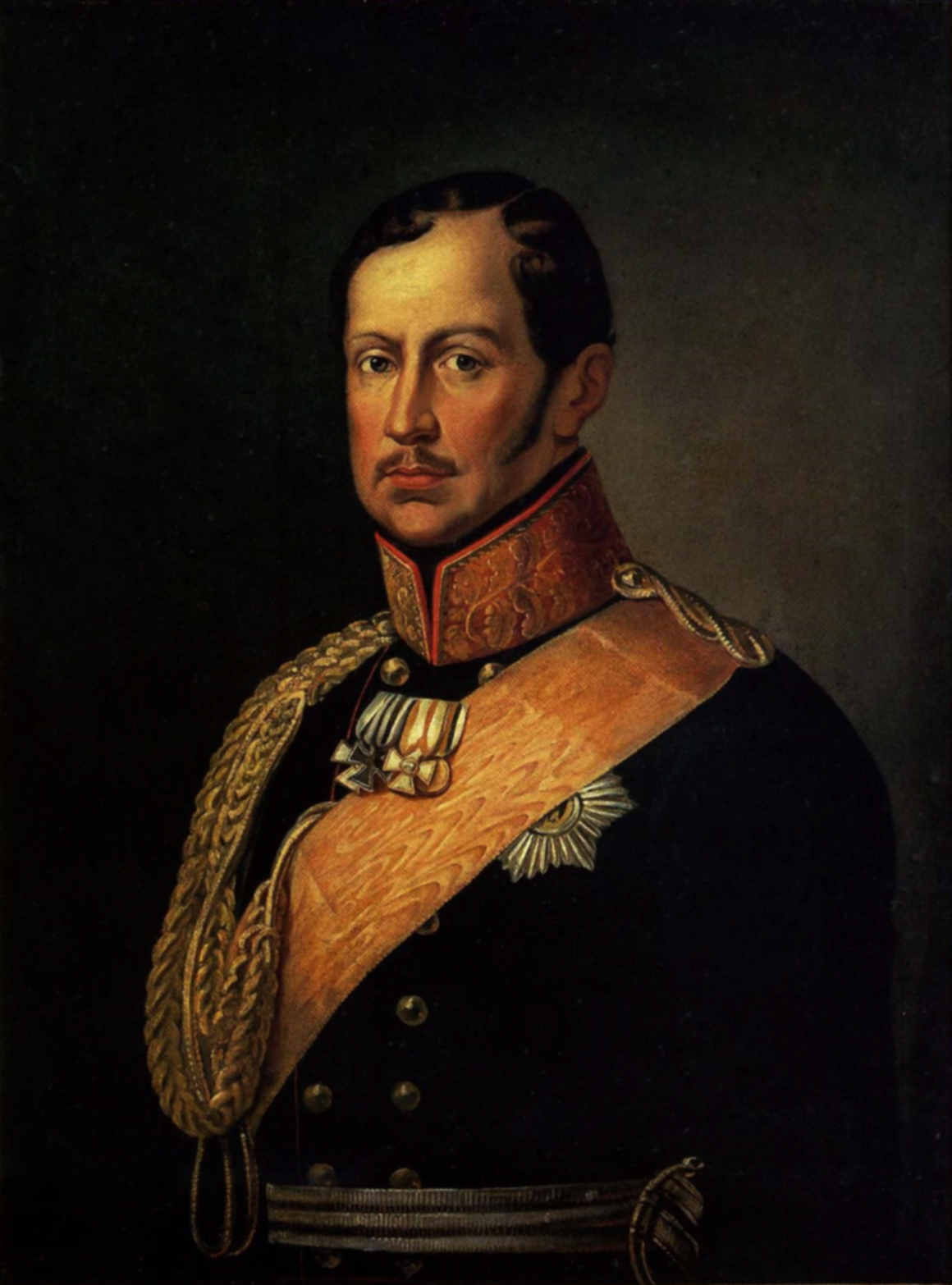
King Frederick William III of Prussia ruled from 1797 to 1840.

Two main developments reshaped religion in Germany. Across the land, there was a movement to unite the larger Lutheran and the smaller Reformed Protestant churches. The churches themselves brought this about in Baden, Nassau, and Bavaria. However, in Prussia King Frederick William III was determined to handle unification entirely on his own terms, without consultation. His goal was to unify the Protestant churches, and to impose a single standardized liturgy, organization and even architecture. The long-term goal was to have fully centralized royal control of all the Protestant churches. In a series of proclamations over several decades the Church of the Prussian Union was formed, bringing together the more numerous Lutherans, and the less numerous Reformed Protestants. The government of Prussia now had full control over church affairs, with the king himself recognized as the leading bishop. Opposition to unification came from the "Old Lutherans" in Silesia who clung tightly to the theological and liturgical forms they had followed since the days of Luther. The government attempted to crack down on them, so they went underground. Tens of thousands migrated, to South Australia, and especially to the United States, where they formed the Missouri Synod, which is still in operation as a conservative denomination. Finally in 1845 a new king Frederick William IV offered a general amnesty and allowed the Old Lutherans to form a separate church association with only nominal government control.

== Great Awakenings ==
The "Great Awakenings" were periods of rapid and dramatic religious revival in American religious history, beginning in the 1730s.

=== First Great Awakening ===
The "First Great Awakening" (or sometimes "The Great Awakening") was a wave of religious enthusiasm among Protestants that swept the American colonies in the 1730s and 1740s, leaving a permanent impact on American religion. It emphasized the traditional Reformed virtues of Godly preaching, rudimentary liturgy, and a deep sense of personal guilt and redemption by Christ Jesus. It resulted from powerful preaching that deeply affected listeners (already church members). Historian Sydney E. Ahlstrom saw it as part of a "great international Protestant upheaval" that also created Pietism in Germany, the Evangelical Revival, and Methodism in England. It had a major impact in reshaping the Congregational, Presbyterian, Dutch Reformed, and German Reformed denominations, and strengthened the small Baptist and Methodist denominations. It brought Christianity to the slaves and was an apocalyptic event in New England that challenged established authority. It incited rancor and division between the traditionalists who insisted on ritual and doctrine and the new revivalists. It had little impact on Anglicans and Quakers.

Unlike the Second Great Awakening that began about 1800 and which reached out to the unchurched, the First Great Awakening focused on people who were already church members. It changed their rituals, their piety, and their self-awareness. The new style of sermons and the way people practiced their faith breathed new life into religion in America. People became passionately and emotionally involved in their religion, rather than passively listening to intellectual discourse in a detached manner. Ministers who used this new style of preaching were generally called "new lights", while the preachers of old were called "old lights". People began to study the Bible at home, which effectively decentralized the means of informing the public on religious manners and was akin to the individualistic trends present in Europe during the Protestant Reformation.

=== Second Great Awakening ===
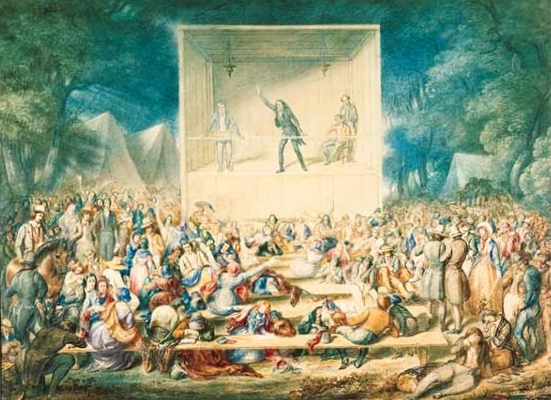
1839 Methodist camp meeting during the Second Great Awakening in the United States.

The "Second Great Awakening" (1790–1840s) was the second great religious revival in United States history and, unlike the First Great Awakening of the 18th century, focused on the unchurched and sought to instill in them a deep sense of personal salvation as experienced in revival meetings. It also sparked the beginnings of groups such as the Mormons and the Holiness movement. Leaders included Charles Grandison Finney, Lyman Beecher, Barton W. Stone, Peter Cartwright and James Finley.

In New England, the renewed interest in religion inspired a wave of social activism. In western New York, the spirit of revival encouraged the emergence of the Restoration Movement, the Latter Day Saint movement, Adventism and the Holiness movement. In the west especially—at Cane Ridge, Kentucky and in Tennessee—the revival strengthened the Methodists and the Baptists and introduced into America a new form of religious expression—the Scottish camp meeting.

The Second Great Awakening made its way across the frontier territories, fed by intense longing for a prominent place for God in the life of the new nation, a new liberal attitude toward fresh interpretations of the Bible, and a seemingly contagious experience of zeal for authentic spirituality. As these revivals spread, they gathered converts to Protestant sects of the time. However, the revivals eventually moved freely across denominational lines, with practically identical results, and went farther than ever toward breaking down the allegiances which kept adherents to these denominations loyal to their own. Consequently, the revivals were accompanied by a growing dissatisfaction with Evangelical churches and especially with the doctrine of Calvinism, which was nominally accepted or at least tolerated in most Evangelical churches at the time.

Various unaffiliated movements arose that were often restorationist in outlook, considering contemporary Christianity of the time to be a deviation from the true, original Christianity. These groups attempted to transcend Protestant denominationalism and orthodox Christian creeds to restore Christianity to its original form.

=== Third Great Awakening ===
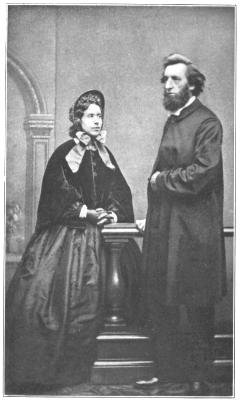
William Booth and his wife founded The Salvation Army during the Third Great Awakening.

The "Third Great Awakening" was a period of religious activism in American history from the late 1850s to the 1900s. It affected pietistic Protestant denominations and had a strong sense of social activism. It gathered strength from the postmillennial theology that the Second Coming of Christ would come after mankind had reformed the entire earth. The Social Gospel Movement gained its force from the Awakening, as did the worldwide missionary movement. New groupings emerged, such as the Holiness movement, Nazarene movement, and Christian Science. Significant names include Dwight L. Moody, Ira D. Sankey, William Booth and Catherine Booth (founders of the Salvation Army), Charles Spurgeon and James Caughey. Hudson Taylor began the China Inland Mission and Thomas John Barnardo founded orphanages. The Keswick Convention movement began out of the British Holiness movement, encouraging a lifestyle of holiness, unity and prayer.

Mary Baker Eddy introduced Christian Science, which gained a national following. In 1880, the Salvation Army denomination arrived in America. Although its theology was based on ideals expressed during the Second Great Awakening, its focus on poverty was of the Third. The Society for Ethical Culture was established in New York City in 1876 by Felix Adler which attracted a Reform Jewish clientele. Charles Taze Russell founded a Bible Student movement now known as The Jehovah's Witnesses

With Jane Addams's Hull House in Chicago as its center, the settlement house movement and the vocation of social work were deeply influenced by the Tolstoyan reworking of Christian idealism. The final group to emerge from this awakening in North America was Pentecostalism, which had its roots in the Methodist, Wesleyan, and Holiness movements, and began in 1906 on Azusa Street, in Los Angeles. Pentecostalism would later lead to the Charismatic movement.

== 20th century ==
Protestant Christianity in the 20th century was characterized by accelerating fragmentation. The century saw the rise of both liberal and conservative splinter groups, as well as a general secularization of Western society. The Roman Catholic Church instituted many reforms in order to modernize. Missionaries also made inroads in the Far East, establishing further followings in China, Taiwan, Korea, and Japan. At the same time, state-promoted atheism in Communist Eastern Europe and the Soviet Union brought many Eastern Orthodox Christians to Western Europe and the United States, leading to greatly increased contact between Western and Eastern Christianity. Nevertheless, church attendance declined more in Western Europe than it did in the East. Christian ecumenism grew in importance, beginning at the Edinburgh Missionary Conference in 1910, and accelerated after the Second Vatican Council (1962–1965) of the Catholic Church. The Liturgical Movement became significant in both Catholic and Protestant Christianity, especially in Anglicanism.

Another movement which grew up over the 20th century was Christian anarchism which rejects the church, state or any power other than God. They usually believe in absolute nonviolence. Leo Tolstoy's book The Kingdom of God is Within You published in 1894, is believed to be the catalyst for this movement. Because of its extremist political views, however, its appeal has been largely limited to the highly educated, especially those with erstwhile humanist sentiments; the thoroughgoing aversion to institutionalism on Christian anarchists' part has also hindered acceptance of this philosophy on a large scale.

The 1950s saw a boom in the Evangelical church in America. The post–World War II prosperity experienced in the U.S. also had its effects on the church. Although simplistically referred to as "morphological fundamentalism", the phrase nonetheless accurately describes the physical developments experienced. Church buildings were erected in large numbers, and the Evangelical church's activities grew along with this expansive physical growth.

=== Pentecostal movement ===
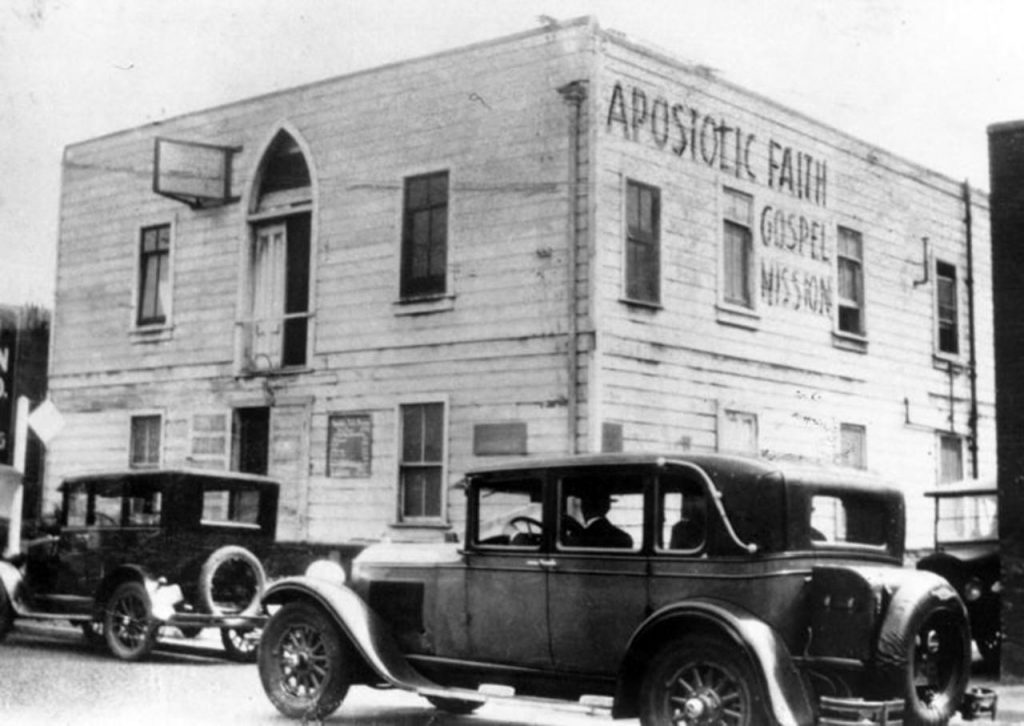
The Apostolic Faith Mission on Azusa Street, Los Angeles, California, now considered to be the birthplace of Pentecostalism

Another development in 20th-century Christianity was the rise of the modern Pentecostal movement. Although its roots predate the year 1900, its actual birth is commonly attributed to the 20th century. Sprung from Methodist and Wesleyan roots, it arose out of meetings at an urban mission on Azusa Street in Los Angeles, California. From there it spread around the world, carried by those who experienced what they believed to be miraculous moves of God there. These Pentecost-like manifestations have steadily been in evidence throughout the history of Christianity—such as seen in the two Great Awakenings that started in the United States. However, Azusa Street is widely accepted as the fount of the modern Pentecostal movement. Pentecostalism, which in turn birthed the Charismatic movement within already established denominations, continues to be an important force in western Christianity.

=== Modernism, fundamentalism, and neo-orthodoxy ===
As the more radical implications of the scientific and cultural influences of the Enlightenment began to be felt in Protestant churches, especially in the 19th century, Liberal Christianity, exemplified especially by numerous theologians in Germany in the 19th century, sought to bring the churches alongside of the broad revolution that Modernism represented. In doing so, new critical approaches to the Bible were developed, new attitudes became evident about the role of religion in society, and a new openness to questioning the nearly universally accepted definitions of Christian orthodoxy began to become obvious.

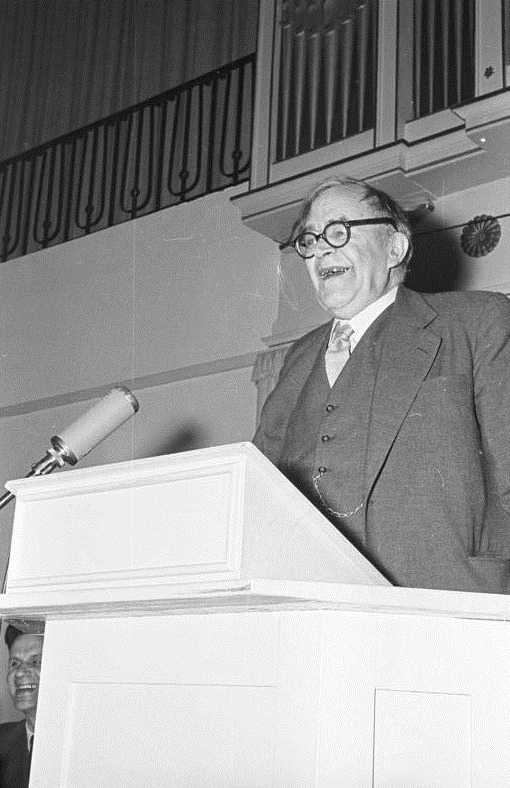
Karl Barth is often regarded as the greatest Protestant theologian of the twentieth century.

In reaction to these developments, Christian fundamentalism was a movement to reject the radical influences of philosophical humanism, as this was affecting the Christian religion. Especially targeting critical approaches to the interpretation of the Bible, and trying to blockade the inroads made into their churches by atheistic scientific assumptions, the fundamentalists began to appear in various denominations as numerous independent movements of resistance to the drift away from historic Christianity. Over time, the Fundamentalist Evangelical movement has divided into two main wings, with the label Fundamentalist following one branch, while Evangelical has become the preferred banner of the more moderate movement. Although both movements primarily originated in the English speaking world, the majority of Evangelicals now live elsewhere in the world.

A third, but less popular, option than either liberalism or fundamentalism was the neo-orthodox movement, which generally affirmed a higher view of Scripture than liberalism but did not tie the main doctrines of the Christian faith to precise theories of Biblical inspiration. If anything, thinkers in this camp denounced such quibbling between liberals and conservatives as a dangerous distraction from the duties of Christian discipleship. This branch of thought arose in the early 20th century in the context of the rise of the Third Reich in Germany and the accompanying political and ecclesiastical destabilization of Europe in the years before and during World War II. Neo-orthodoxy's highly contextual, dialectical modes of argument and reasoning often rendered its main premises incomprehensible to American thinkers and clergy, and it was frequently either dismissed out of hand as unrealistic or cast into the reigning left- or right-wing molds of theologizing. Karl Barth, a Swiss Reformed pastor and professor, brought this movement into being by drawing upon earlier criticisms of established (largely modernist) Protestant thought made by the likes of Søren Kierkegaard and Franz Overbeck. Dietrich Bonhoeffer, murdered by the Nazis for allegedly taking part in an attempt to overthrow the Hitler regime, adhered to this school of thought; his classic The Cost of Discipleship is likely the best-known and accessible statement of the neo-orthodox position.

=== Evangelicalism ===
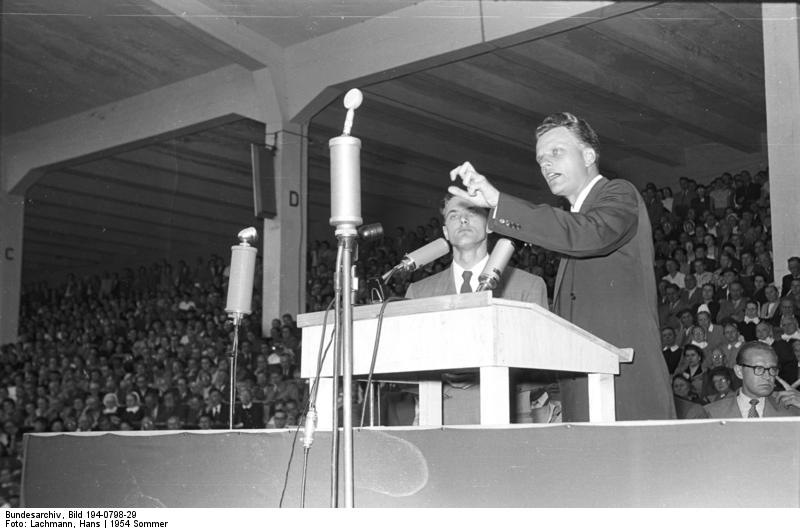
One of the prominent evangelical revivalists, Billy Graham preaching in Duisburg, Germany, in 1954.

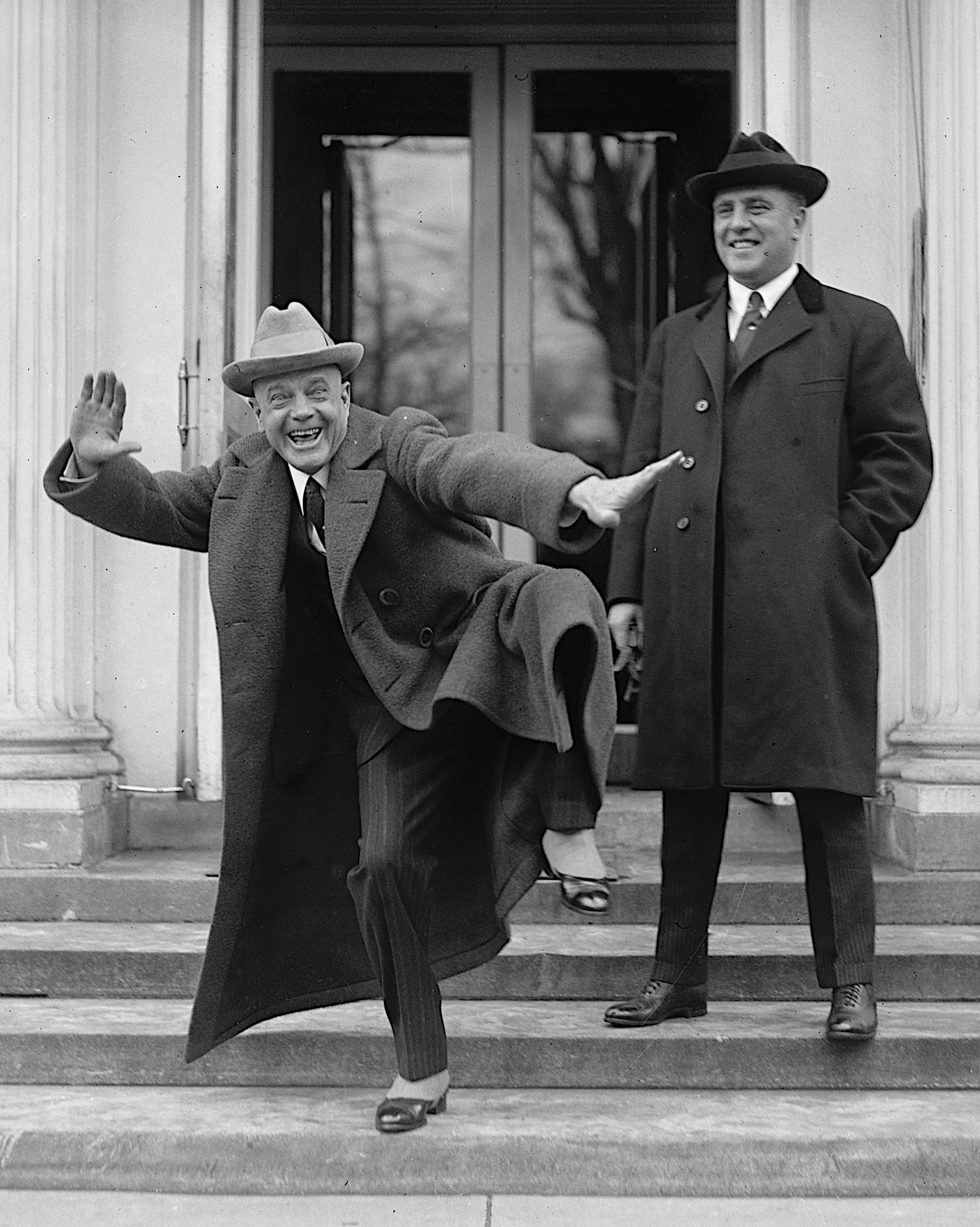
Billy Sunday at the White House, Washington, D.C., 1922

In the U.S. and elsewhere in the world, there has been a marked rise in the evangelical wing of Protestant denominations, especially those that are more exclusively evangelical, and a corresponding decline in the mainstream liberal churches. In the post–World War I era, Liberalism was the faster-growing sector of the American church. Liberal wings of denominations were on the rise, and a considerable number of seminaries held and taught from a liberal perspective as well. In the post–World War II era, the trend began to swing back towards the conservative camp in America's seminaries and church structures. Those entering seminaries and other postgraduate theologically related programs showed more conservative leanings than their average predecessors.

The neo-Evangelical push of the 1940s and 1950s produced a movement that continues to have wide influence. In the southern U.S., the more moderate neo-Evangelicals, represented by leaders such as Billy Graham, experienced a notable surge displacing the caricature of the pulpit pounding country preachers of fundamentalism. The stereotypes gradually shifted. Some, such as Jerry Falwell, managed to maintain credibility in the eyes of many fundamentalists, as well as to gain stature as a more moderate Evangelical.

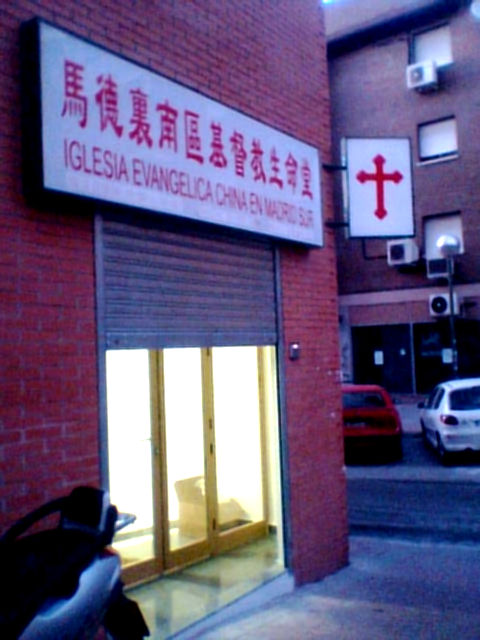
Chinese evangelical church in Madrid, Spain. Evangelicalism is a driving force behind the current rise of Protestantism, especially in the Global South.

Evangelicalism is not a single, monolithic entity. The Evangelical churches and their adherents cannot be easily stereotyped. Most are not fundamentalist, in the narrow sense that this term has come to represent; though many still refer to themselves as such. There have always been diverse views on issues, such as openness to cooperation with non-Evangelicals, the applicability of the Bible to political choices and social or scientific issues, and even the limited inerrancy of the Bible.

However, the movement has managed in an informal way, to reserve the name Evangelical for those who adhere to an historic Christian faith, a paleo-orthodoxy, as some have put it. Those who call themselves "moderate evangelicals" (although considered conservative in relation to society as a whole) still hold to the fundamentals of the historic Christian faith. Even "Liberal" Evangelicals label themselves as such not so much in terms of their theology, but rather to advertise that they are progressive in their civic, social, or scientific perspective.

There is some debate as to whether Pentecostals are considered to be Evangelical. Their roots in Pietism and the Holiness movement are undisputedly Evangelical, but their doctrinal distinctives differ from the more traditional Evangelicals, who are less likely to have an expectation of private revelations from God, and differ from the Pentecostal perspective on miracles, angels, and demons. Typically, those who include the Pentecostals in the Evangelical camp are labeled neo-evangelical by those who do not. The National Association of Evangelicals and the Evangelical Alliance have numerous Trinitarian Pentecostal denominations among their membership. Another relatively late entrant to wide acceptance within the Evangelical fold is the Seventh-day Adventist Church.

Evangelicals are as diverse as the names that appear—Billy Graham, Chuck Colson, J. Vernon McGee, John MacArthur, J. I. Packer, John R. W. Stott, Pat Robertson, Jimmy Carter, etc.—or even Evangelical institutions such as Dallas Theological Seminary (Dallas), Gordon–Conwell Theological Seminary (Boston), Trinity Evangelical Divinity School (Chicago), The Master's Seminary (California), Wheaton College (Illinois), the Christian Coalition, The Christian Embassy (Jerusalem), etc. Although there exists a diversity in the Evangelical community worldwide, the ties that bind all Evangelicals are still apparent. These include but are not limited to a high view of Scripture, belief in the Deity of Christ, the Trinity, salvation by grace alone through faith alone, and the bodily resurrection of Christ.

=== Spread of secularism ===
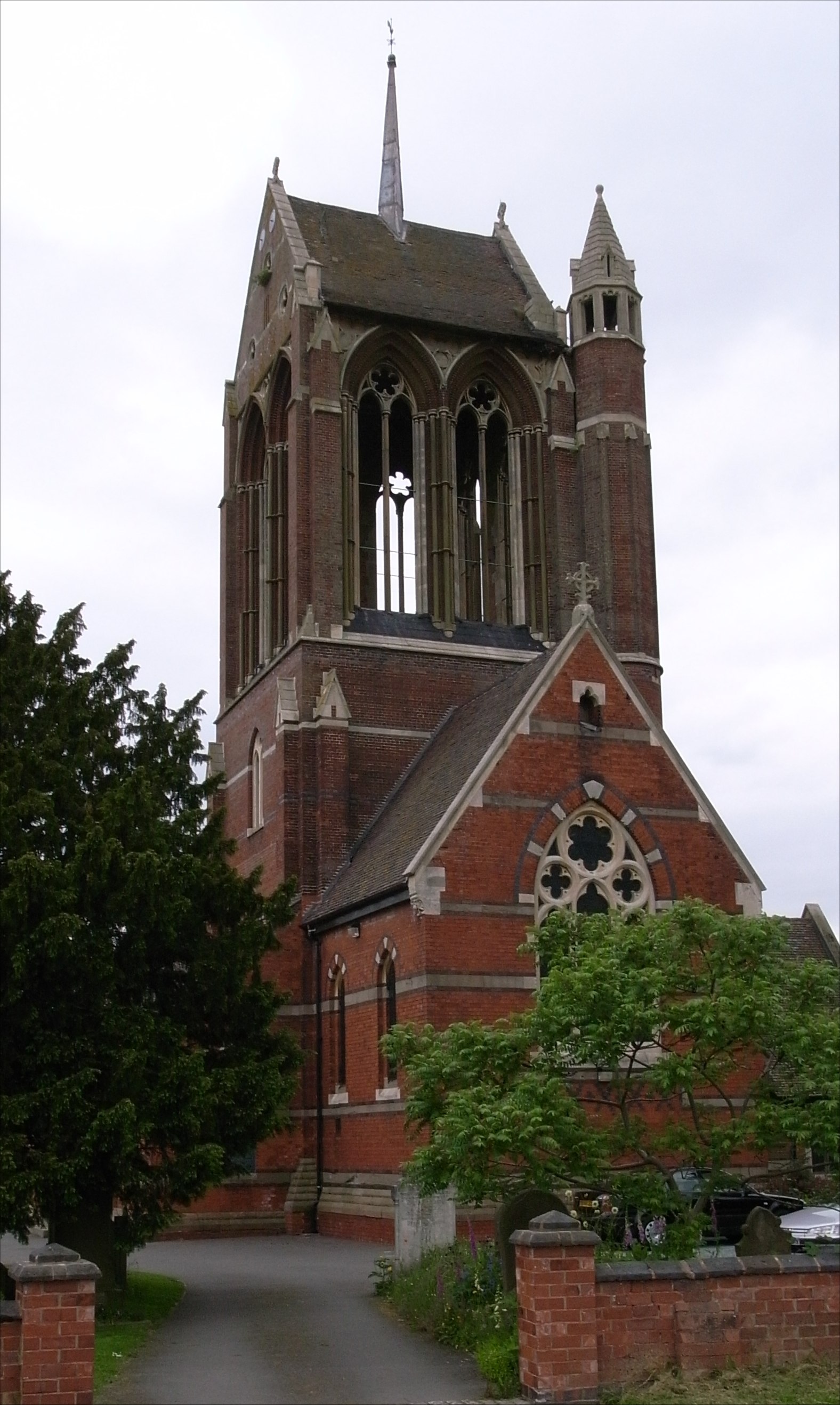
St Mary's, Wythall, a redundant church, now houses an electrical company. Secularism is rising in the West, causing churches to find new uses.

Europe

In Europe there has been a general move away from religious observance and belief in Christian teachings and a move towards secularism. The "secularization of society", attributed to the time of the Enlightenment and its following years, is largely responsible for the spread of secularism. For example, the Gallup International Millennium Survey showed that only about one sixth of Europeans attend regular religious services, less than half gave God "high importance", and only about 40% believe in a "personal God". Nevertheless, the large majority considered that they "belong" to a religious denomination.

The Americas and Australia

In North America, South America and Australia, the other three continents where Christianity is the dominant professed religion, religious observance is higher than in Europe. In general, the United States leans toward the conservative in comparison to other western nations in its general culture, in part due to the Christian element found primarily in its Midwestern and southern states.

South America, historically Catholic, has experienced a large Evangelical and Pentecostal infusion in the 20th century due to the influx of Christian missionaries from abroad.

== See also ==
- Christian revival
- Christianity in the modern era
- Heresy in Christianity § Reformation and Modern Era (1520–present)
- History of the Catholic Church
- Timeline of Christianity

=== Christianity by century ===
- Christianity in the 16th century
- Christianity in the 17th century
- Christianity in the 18th century
- Christianity in the 19th century
- Christianity in the 20th century
- Christianity in the 21st century
