= Leyser (family) =

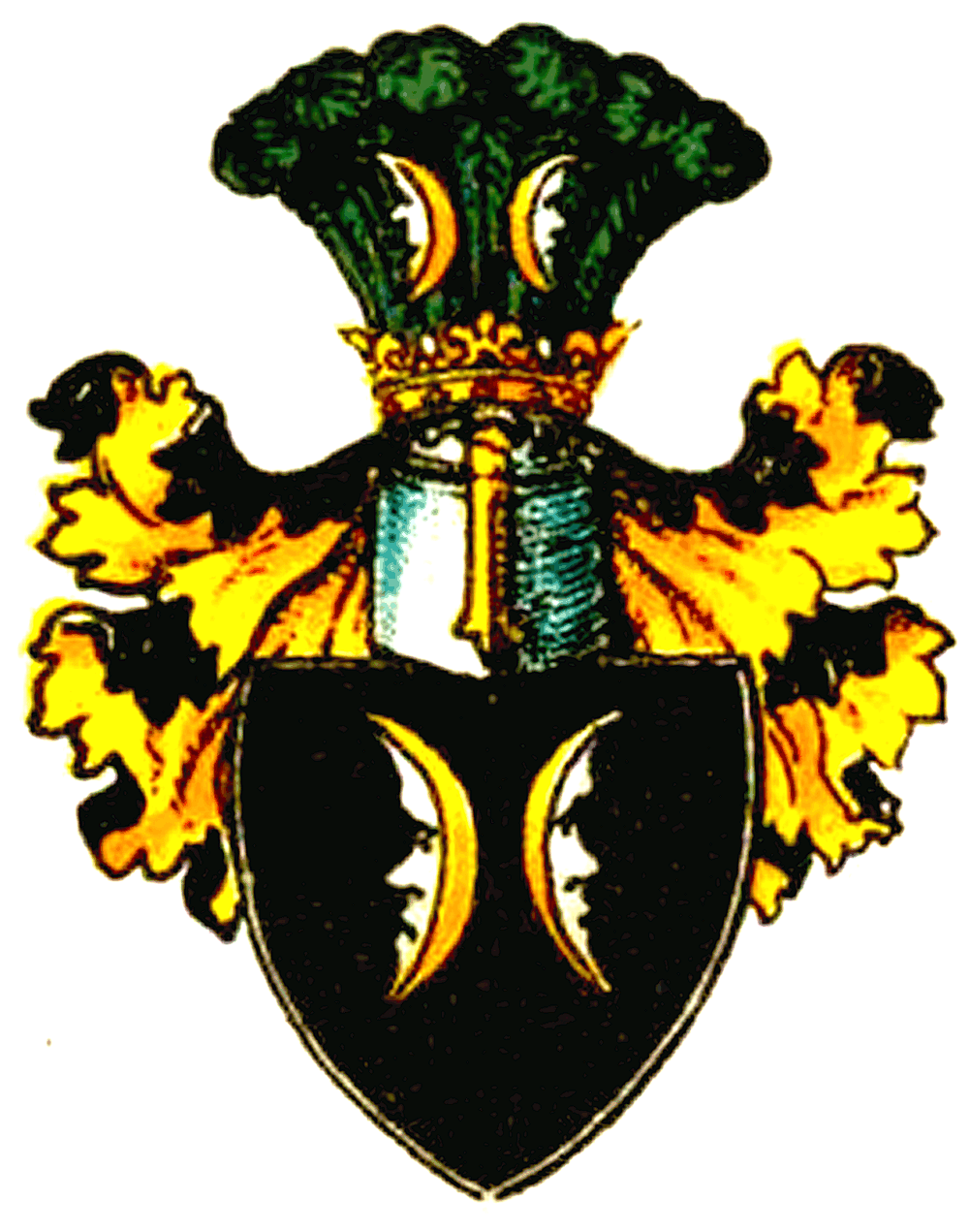

Leyser is a German family of many Lutheran theologians. The family moved during sixteenth century from Swabia to North Germany.

- Caspar Leyser (d. 1554 or 1555), pastor, Jakob Andreae's brother in law.
- Polykarp Leyser the Elder (1552-1610), only son of Caspar Leyser, professor of theology, court-preacher in Dresden.
- Polykarp Leyser II (1586-1633), elder son of Polykarp Leyser the Elder, professor at Wittenberg and Leipsic.
- Wilhelm Leyser (1592-1649), younger son of Polykarp Leyser the Elder, superintendent at Torgau and professor at Wittenberg.
- Johannes Leyser (1631-1685), son of Polykarp Leyser II, pastor.
- Polykarp Leyser III (1656-1725), grandson of Polykarp Leyser II, general superintendent of Celle.
- Polykarp Leyser IV (1690-1728) great-great grandson of Polykarp Leyser the Elder, a German Lutheran theologian, philosopher, physician, lawyer, writer and historian.
- Leonhard Leyser (°-1626), German Lutheran pastor in Idar

== See also ==
- Michael Leyser, physician
- Friedrich Wilhelm von Leysser, botanist
