= Polycarp (disambiguation) =

Polycarp (AD 69-155), was one of the Christian Apostolic Fathers and Bishop of Smyrna.

Polycarp, the Latin Polycarpus, or the Germanized Polykarp may also refer to:

in religion:

- Polycarpus, the conventional title of a compilation of Gregory of San Grisogono
- Polycarp of Alexandria, a 4th-century Christian martyr
- Polycarpus I of Byzantium (died AD 81), Bishop of Byzantium
- Polycarpus II of Byzantium (died AD 144), Bishop of Byzantium
- Polycarp the Archimandrite (died 1182) of the Kiev Caves, an Eastern Orthodox saint
- Polycarpus Augin Aydin (born 1971), Syriac Orthodox Church bishops
- Polykarp Leyser the Elder (1552 – 1610), German Lutheran theologian, superintendent in Braunschweig
- Polykarp Leyser II (1586 – 1633), German Lutheran theologian, superintendent in Leipzig
- Polykarp Leyser III (1656 – 1725), German Lutheran theologian, superintendent, chaplain and orientalist
- Polykarp Leyser IV (1690 – 1728), German Lutheran theologian, philosopher, physician, lawyer and historian

in other uses:

- Johann Christian Polycarp Erxleben (1744 – 1777), German scientist
- Polycarp (children's TV show host), children's TV show host in south Louisiana
- Polykarp Kusch (1911 – 1993), German-American physicist and Nobel laureate
- Master Polikarp's Dialog with Death, 15th-century Polish dialogue
- Saint-Polycarpe, a commune in the Aude department in southern France
- Saint-Polycarpe, Quebec, a municipality in the Vaudreuil-Soulanges Regional County Municipality in the Montérégie region in Quebec, Canada

not to be confused with:

- Polycarpic, a type of plant which reproduces multiple times during its lifetime
