= Polykarp Leyser =

Polykarp Leyser may refer to:

- Polykarp Leyser the Elder (1552 – 1610), German Lutheran theologian, superintendent in Braunschweig
- Polykarp Leyser II (1586 – 1633), German Lutheran theologian, superintendent in Leipzig
- Polykarp Leyser III (1656 – 1725), German Lutheran theologian, superintendent, chaplain and orientalist
- Polykarp Leyser IV (1690 – 1728), German Lutheran theologian, philosopher, physician, lawyer and historian

== See also ==
- Polycarp
