= Scholastic Lutheran Christology =

Lutheran theology of Jesus Christ

Scholastic Lutheran Christology is the orthodox Lutheran theology of Jesus that was developed using the methodology of Lutheran scholasticism.

On the general basis of the Chalcedonian Christology and following the rule of the Scriptures as the only rule of faith, the Lutheran and some of the other Protestant scholastics at the close of the sixteenth and during the seventeenth century developed new doctrinal statements on Christ's person. The propelling cause was the Lutheran doctrine of the real presence of Christ's body in the Lord's Supper and his body'somnipresence in general, and the controversies growing out of that doctrine with the Zwinglians and Calvinists, and among the Lutherans themselves. These new features relate to the communion of the two natures and to the states and the offices of Christ. The first was never adopted by the Reformed, but rather was in part explicitly rejected; the second and third were the joint doctrines of both, but with a very material difference in the understanding of the second.

== Communicatio idiomatum ==
The communicatio idiomatum means the communication of attributes or properties (Gk. idiomata, Lat. proprietates) of one nature to the other, or to the whole person. It is derived from the hypostatic union and the communio naturarum. Lutheran theologians distinguish three kinds or genera:

1. genus idiomaticum (or idiopoietikon), whereby the properties of one nature are transferred and applied to the whole person, for which are quoted such passages as Rom. i. 3; I Pet. iii. 18, iv. 1.
2. The genus apotelesmaticum (koinopoietikon), whereby the redemptory functions and actions which belong to the whole person (the apotelesmata) are predicated of only one or the other nature (I Tim. ii. 5–6; Heb. i. 2 3).
3. The genus auchematicum, or maiestaticum, whereby the human nature is clothed with and magnified by the attributes of the divine nature (John iii. 13, v. 27; Matt. xxviii. 18, 20; Rom. ix. 5; Phil. ii. 10).
  Under this head the Lutheran Church claims a certain ubiquity or omnipresence for the body of Christ, on the ground of the personal union of the two natures; but as to the extent of this omnipresence there were two distinct schools which are both represented in Formula of Concord (1577). Brenz and the Swabian Lutherans maintained an absolute ubiquity of Christ's humanity from his very infancy, thus making the incarnation not only an assumption of the human nature, but also a deification of it, although the divine attributes were admitted to have been concealed during the state of humiliation. Martin Chemnitz and the Saxon divines called this view a monstrosity, and taught only a relative ubiquity, depending on Christ's will (hence called volipraesentia, or multivolipraesentia), who may be present with his whole person wherever he pleases to be or has promised to be.
4. A fourth kind would be the genus kenoticum (from kenosis), or tapeinoticum (from tapeinosis), Phil. ii. 7, 8; i.e., a communication of the properties of the human nature to the divine nature. But this is decidedly rejected by the old Lutherans as inconsistent with the unchangeableness of the divine nature, and as a "horrible and blasphemous" doctrine (Formula of Concord, p. 612), but is asserted by the modern Kenoticists.

The Reformed theologians adopted the communicatio idiomatum while disagreeing with the Lutheran formulation, especially regarding the genus maiestaticum (although they might approve the first two kinds, at least by way of what Zwingli termed allaiosis, or a rhetorical exchange of one part for another); and they decidedly rejected the third kind, because they saw omnipresence, whether absolute or relative, as being inconsistent with the necessary limitation of a human body, as well as with the Scriptural witness of Christ's ascension to heaven and promised return (see Black Rubric). The third genus can never be fully carried out, unless the humanity of Christ is also eternalized. The attributes, moreover, are not an outside appendix, but inherent qualities of the substance to which they belong, and inseparable from it. Hence a communication of attributes would imply a communication or mixture of natures. The divine and human natures can indeed hold free and intimate intercourse with each other; but the divine nature can never be transformed into the human, nor the human nature into the divine. Christ possessed all the attributes of both natures; but the natures, nevertheless, remain separate and distinct.

== Twofold state of Christ ==
The twofold state of Christ consists of the state of humiliation and the state of exaltation. This doctrine is based upon Philippians 2:5–9. The state of humiliation embraces the supernatural conception, birth, circumcision, education, earthly life, passion, death, and burial of Christ; the state of exaltation includes the resurrection, ascension, and the sitting at the right hand of God.

But here, again, the two confessions differ very considerably. First as to the descent into Hades. The Scholastic Lutherans, particularly during the era of High Orthodoxy from 1600 to 1685, regarded it as a triumph over Hell and made it the first stage of exaltation; while the Reformed divines viewed it as the last stage of the state of humiliation. It may be viewed as the turning-point from the one state to the other, and thus belonging to both. Secondly, the Lutheran Confessions of the Book of Concord refer the two states only to the human nature of Christ, regarding the divine as not susceptible of any humiliation or exaltation.

The Reformed divines refer them to both natures; so that Christ's human nature was in a state of humiliation as compared with its future exaltation, and his divine nature was in the state of humiliation as to its external manifestation (ratione occultationis). With them, the incarnation itself is the beginning of the state of humiliation, while the Book of Concord excludes the incarnation from the humiliation.

Finally, the Scholastic Lutherans regarded the humiliation as only a partial concealment of the actual use (Gk. krypsis chreseos) of the divine attributes by the incarnate Logos.

== The threefold office of Christ ==
The threefold office or function of Christ was first presented by Eusebius of Caesarea. The theologians who followed Martin Luther and Melanchthon down to the middle of the seventeenth century treated Christ's saving work under the two heads of king and priest. John Calvin, in the first edition of his Institutes of the Christian Religion (1536), did the same, and it was not until the third edition (1559) and the Genevan Catechism that he fully presented the three offices. This convenient threefold division of the office of Christ was used by the theologians of both confessions during the seventeenth century. Ernesti opposed it, but Schleiermacher restored it.

1. The prophetical office (munus, or officium propheticum) includes teaching and the miracles of Christ.
2. The priestly office (munus sacerdotale) consists of the satisfaction made for the sins of the world by the death on the cross, and in the continued intercession of the exalted Savior for his people (redemptio et intercessio sacerdotalis).
3. The kingly office (munus regium), whereby Christ founded his kingdom, defends his Church against all enemies, and rules all things in heaven and on earth. The earlier theologians distinguished between the reign of nature (regnum naturae sive potentiae), which embraces all things; the reign of grace (regnum gratiae), which relates to the Church militant on earth; and the reign of glory (regnum gloriae), which belongs to the Church triumphant in heaven.

== See also ==
- Extra calvinisticum
