= Jacob Heerbrand =

German Protestant theologian, reformer and controversial (1521–1600)

Jacob Heerbrand (12 August 1521 – 22 May 1600) was a German Protestant theologian, reformer and controversialist.

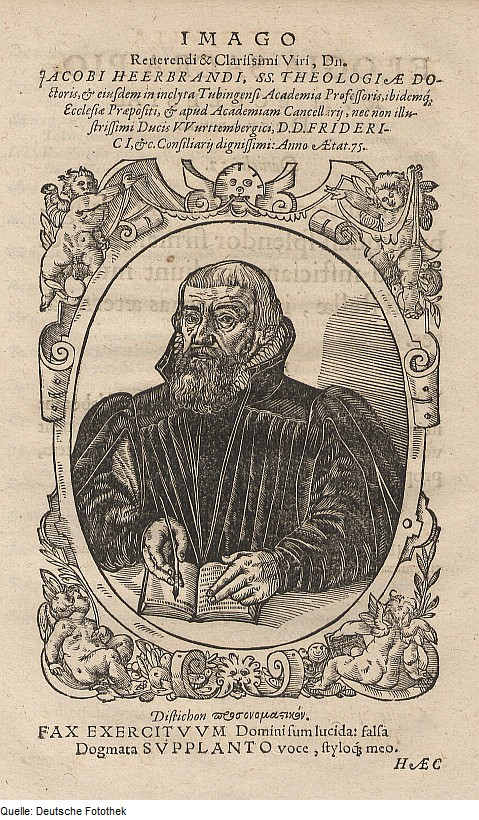
Jacob Heerbrand.

== Life ==
He was born at Giengen in Swabia on 12 August 1521. He was educated at the school at Ulm, and at the universities of Wittenberg (M.A., 1543) and Tübingen (D.Theol., 1550). He was for five years (1538–43) the pupil of Martin Luther and Philip Melanchthon.

In 1543 he entered the service of the Württemberg Church and accepted a diaconate at Tübingen, in order to continue his studies. For refusing to accept the Interim he was removed from his office, along with Erhard Schnepf, on 11 November 1548 but remained in Tübingen to study Hebrew under Oswald Schreckenfuchs, in company with Jakob Andreä. On 11 February 1551 he became pastor at Herrenberg, near Ehingen, where Johann Brenz was then residing.

In June 1551 Heerbrand with other local theologians subscribed to the Confessio Wirtembergica, and in March 1552, with Brenz and Jakob Beurlin he was sent to defend it at the Council of Trent. Heerbrand cooperated with the Swabians in their efforts to allay the Osiandrian controversies (1552–53), and in May 1554 he was sent to a conference of theologians at Naumburg. On the invitation of the Margrave of Baden-Pforzheim he went to Pforzheim in September 1556, as pastor and director of the State Church, which had just been reformed on the basis of the Württemberg agenda. In September 1557, he returned to Tübingen as professor of theology, a position which he retained for forty years, being the last pupil of the Wittenberg Reformers to occupy this chair. He was at the same time superintendent of the stipendium, and eight times rector of the university. In 1590 he succeeded Andreä as chancellor of the university and provost of the cathedral church.

He was a frequent festival orator at great academic ceremonies, including the memorial service in honor of Melanchthon in 1560, and at the university jubilee in 1578. On 5 January 1599 he resigned his offices because of infirmity. He died at Tübingen on 22 May 1600.

== Works ==
As a dogmatician he exerted influence through his disputations and his Compendium theologicae methodi quaestionibus tradatum (Tübingen, 1573). During the negotiations of the Tübingen theologians with Patriarch Jeremias II of Constantinople, it was translated by Martin Crusius into Greek, and circulated to Constantinople, Alexandria, Greece, and Asia Minor.

Heerbrand as a controversialist engaged many Roman Catholic theologians: with the Dominican Peter a Soto, in vindication of the Confessio Wirtembergica in 1561; with Melchior Zanger of Ehingen-Rottenburg; with E. Gotthard of Passau; with J. B. Fickler of Salzburg; with Wilhelm Lindanus, bishop of Ruremond; with the Polish Stanislas Socolocius; with the Freiburg professors F. Lorichius and Michael Hager, and especially with the Jesuits Heinrich Blissemius of Prague and Graz, Gregory of Valencia at Ingolstadt, Sigmund Emhofer of Vienna, and Georg Scherer of Graz. Heerbrand claimed that the ultimate aim of the Jesuit party's literary activity was calumny of Protestantism, adulation of Roman Catholic princes, and subversion of religious peace (Refutatio crassissimorum errorum, ii. 17; Apologia explicationis, p. 55).
