= Leyser =

Leyser is a surname. Notable people with the surname include:

- Polykarp Leyser (disambiguation), multiple people
- Ernst von Leyser (1889–1962), German Wehrmacht general and war criminal
- Ernst Ludwig Leyser (1896–1973), German Nazi Party official
- Karl Leyser (1920–1992), German-born British historian, husband of Henrietta and father of Ottoline
- Henrietta Leyser (born 1941), English historian
- Ottoline Leyser (born 1965), British plant biologist
