= Johann Winter von Andernach =

German physician, scholar and humanist (1505–1574)

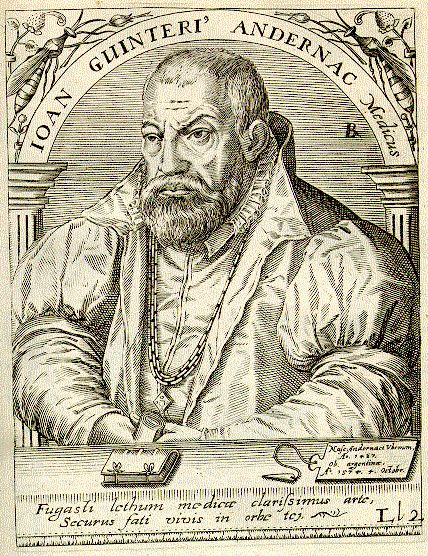
- Born: Johann Winter; 1505; Andernach, Electorate of Cologne, Holy Roman Empire
- Died: 4 October 1574 (aged 68–69); Imperial City of Strassburg, Holy Roman Empire
- Other name: Ioannes Guintherius Andernacus
- Education: University of Montpellier (Ph.D., 1530)
- Scientific career
- Fields: Anatomy
- Workplaces: University of Paris; Schola Argentoratensis
- Academic advisors: Lambertus Hortensius
- Notable students: Johannes Sturm; Guillaume Rondelet; Michael Servetus; Andreas Vesalius

Johann Winter von Andernach (born Johann Winter; 1505 – 4 October 1574) was a German Renaissance physician, university professor, humanist, translator of ancient, mostly medical works, and writer of his own medical, philological and humanities works.

== Life ==
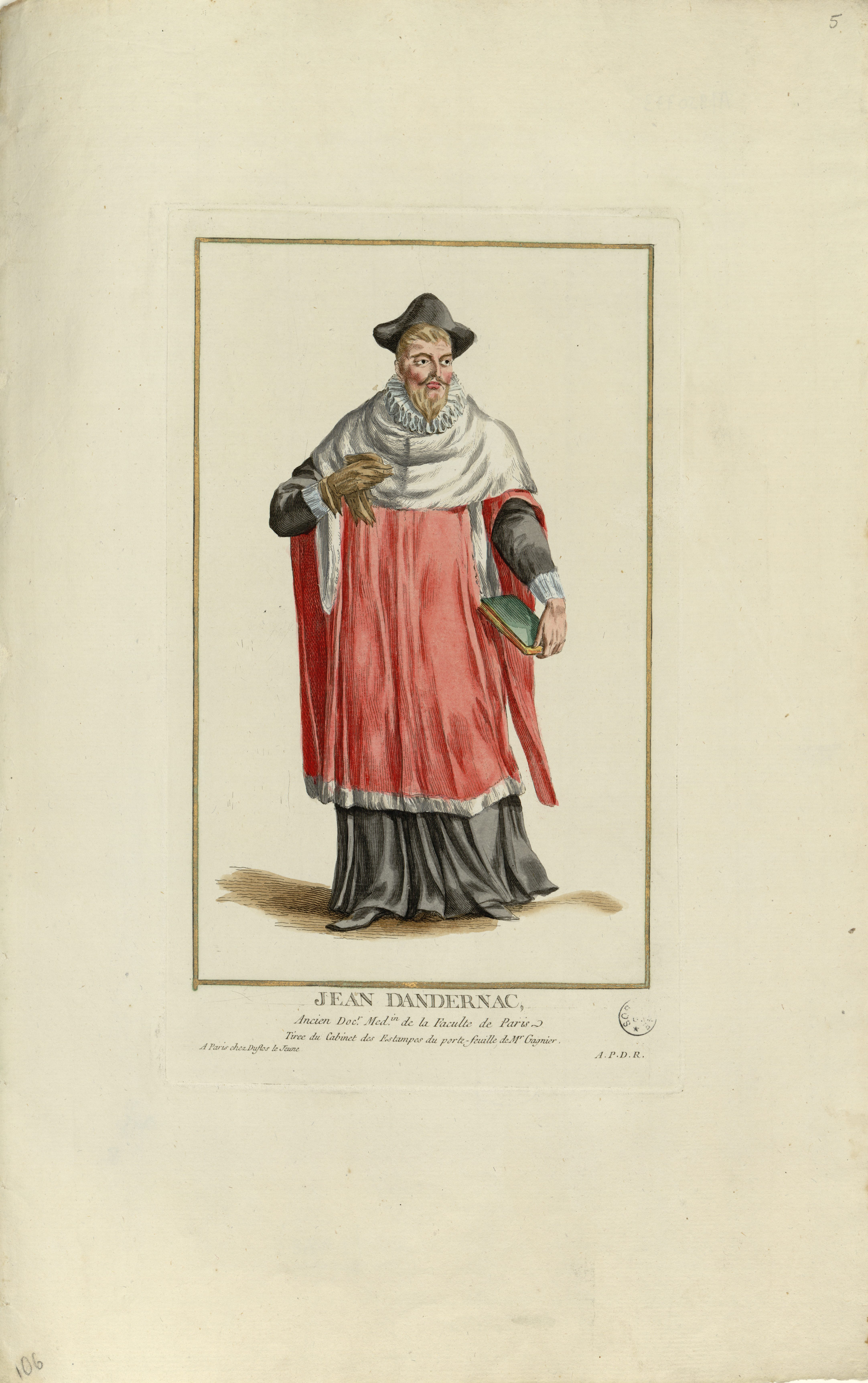
Ganière, Pierre (1663? – 1721), Jean d'Andernac, Physician at the Paris Faculty (Bibliothèque de la Sorbonne, NuBIS)

The family and youth of Winter von Andernach are not well known. He probably came from a poor family and attended the town school in Andernach, then part of the Electorate of Cologne. He left his hometown in 1517 as a teenager. He had a sharp mind, was very curious and was always looking to increase his knowledge. He later moved to Utrecht, where he studied Ancient Greek. There he met Lambertus Hortensius who was a teacher at Utrecht's Hieronymus school. He also met John III, Duke of Cleves, who will later become his patron.

He worked at the University of Paris and the Schola Argentoratensis.

He died, aged about 69, in Strassburg.

== Name ==
Johann Winter (Johannes Winther) von Andernach, so called because he was born in Andernach, experienced many variations of his name throughout his life. When the name "Winter" was translated into Italian and Latin, the "W" was replaced by "Gue" or the "Wi" replaced by "Gui," giving rise to the name "Guenther" and all of its derivatives. Since "Guenther" or "Gunter" was and is a well known German name, it was considered his real name. Thus Johann Winter is known by the following names:

- in Germany: Johann Winter, Johann Winter von Andernach, Johannes Winther (von Andernach), Johann Gwynther von Andernach
- in France: Gonthier d’Andernach, Jehan Guinter d’Andernach
- in Italy: Ioannes Guinterius Andernacus, Guenter Andernacus
- in Latin: Ioannes Guint(h)erius Andernacus

Other variations are "Johann Guenther von Andernach", "Johann Günther of Andernach", "Johann Guinterus (Guintherius) von Andernach ". In addition, he also had a kind of pen name: Ionas Philologus, "Johann the philologist."

== Works ==
- Syntaxis Graeca. Paris, 1527 (Greek syntax).
- Galen's Works translated into Latin
  - De anatomicis administrationibus. 9 vols, Paris, 1531.
  - De Hippocratis et Platonis placitis. Paris, 1534.
  - Anatomicarum institutionum, secundum Galeni sententiam. 4 vols, Paris and Basel, 1536; Venice, 1538; Padua, 1558.
  - Clavdii Galeni Pergameni Medicorvm Omnivm Ferè principis opera, nunc demum a clarissimis et eruditis viris latinitate donata, iam vero ordine justo, et studio exquisito re in lucem recens edita. Quibus, ut solidae veraeque medicinae, non poenitendam operam olim indulsisse iuvabit. Basel, Cratander (Andreas Leennius) 1529; 27 Galen texts into Latin by 9 different translators including Johann Winter as "Ionas Phil."
- Opus de re medica 7 vols. (Medical works of Paul of Aegina), Paris, 1532; translated from the Greek into Latin.
- Institutiones anatomicae. Paris, 1536, 4 vols, standard work for physicians
- Alexander of Tralles's Works. Strasbourg 1549 and 1556; translated into Latin
- De victus ed medicinae ratione cum alio tum pestilentiae tempore observanda commentarius. Strasbourg 1542; composed under the direction of the Strasbourg city council, French by Antoine Pierre 1544, of Winter 1547 in the title
- Instruction très utile par laquelle un chacun se pourra maintenir en santé, tant au temps de peste, comme autre temps. Strasbourg 1544 and 1547; in German
  - Sehr praktische Anweisung, durch die ein jeder sich gesund halten kann, besonders in Pestzeiten wie in anderen Zeiten.
- Bericht, Regiment, und Ordnung wie die Pestilenz und die pestilenzialische Fieber zu erkennen und zu kurieren. Strasbourg, 1564
- Bericht und Ordnung in disen sterbenden leuffen der Pestilentz, auf befelch eines ersamen Rahts der Statt Straßurg. Gestellet durch Johann Gwynther von Andernach. Strasbourg, Rihel, 1564.
- De pestilentia commentarius in quatuor dialogos distinctus. Strasbourg, 1565.
- De medicina veteri et nova tum cognoscenda tum faciunda commentarij duo. Basel: Ex Officina Henricpetrina, 1571.
