= Jakob Beurlin =

German Lutheran theologian and Protestant Reformer

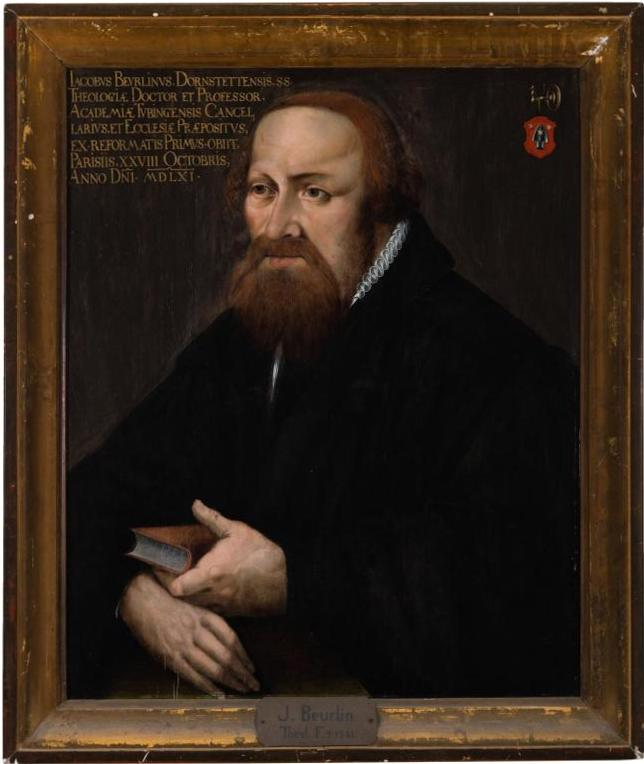
Portrait of Jakob Beurlin at the University of Tübingen (1630)

Jakob Beurlin (1520 – 28 October 1561) was a German Lutheran theologian and Protestant Reformer of the Duchy of Württemberg.

== Life ==
Beurlin was born in Dornstetten. In November 1533, he entered the University of Tübingen. When the Protestant Reformation was introduced there in 1534, he remained faithful to Roman Catholicism, diligently studying philosophy and the writings of the Church Fathers. His transition to the new doctrine took place quietly.

In 1541 he was made administrator of the Martinianum, a foundation for needy students, and at the same time lectured on philosophy. In 1549 he accepted the pastorate of Derendingen near Tübingen, and in 1551 he was called as professor to Tübingen. On 2 June 1557 he examined and signed, together with other theologians, the Confessio Virtembergica, which had been prepared for the Council of Trent, and in the month of August, together with Johannes Brenz's friend Johann Isenmann, he went to Langensalza and afterward to Saxony to come to an understanding with the theologians and councilors of the Elector Maurice concerning the Württemberg Confession as compared with the Saxon, which bad also been prepared for the Council of Trent.

In November 1551, in company with Luther's former steward, Jodocus Neuheller, pastor at Entringen, he was sent as theological adviser of the Württemberg delegates to Trent, where they took notes of the disputations. On 13 January 1552 both returned home, but on 7 March Beurlin, Brenz, Jacob Heerbrand and Valentin Vannius again started for Trent to oppose the decisions of the Council, and to defend the Confessio Virtembergica before it. The Council would not hear them in a public session, and they returned home.

Beurlin now devoted all his time to his academic duties. He lectured on Philip Melanchthon's Loci, the Gospel and First Epistle of John, and the Epistles to the Romans and Hebrews, and drilled the young theologians in disputations. In May 1554 the duke sent him to Prussia to pacify those who had been stirred up by Andreas Osiander's teaching. He was unsuccessful, however, and, disgusted with the behavior of the factions, he declined the bishopric offered to him by Duke Albert and returned home.

In the interest of his academic office he now retired in favor of Jakob Andreae, who was a more willing interpreter of the theology and ecclesiastical policy of Brenz. In October, 1557, Beurlin and his father-in-law, Matthaeus Alber, went to the Colloquy of Worms in place of the Thuringian theologians. At the Stuttgart synod Beurlin also remained in the background, but he assisted Brenz in the defense of the Confessio Wirtembergica against the Dominican theologian Pedro de Soto.

Vice-chancellor of the university after 1557, Beurlin was the leader of the Swabians at the Erfurt Conference in April 1561, and was still more prominent on his last journey made in the service of the German Protestant cause. King Antoine of Navarre sought both at Stuttgart and Heidelberg for a theologian to advise him in the controversy which had arisen between the Cardinal of Guise and Theodore Beza concerning the relation of the French Protestants to the Augsburg Confession at the Colloquy of Poissy. Duke Christoph sent three theologians, Beurlin, Andreae, and the court preacher Balthazar Bidembach. Before leaving, Beurlin was made chancellor of the university and provost of the Collegiate Church (29 September). The theologians left on 3 October and arrived in Paris on 19 October. Meanwhile, the Colloquy at Poissy had been broken off, and the theologians had to wait till the king called them back into session. On 24 October Beurlin fell ill with the plague and died in Paris.
