= Michael Leyser =

German physician and anatomist

Michael Leyser (also Michael Lyser: 14 April 1626 – 20 December 1660) was a German physician and anatomist.

== Life ==
Michael Leyser was born in Leipzig in 1626. His father was the theologian Polykarp Leyser II (1586-1633). There were a number of members of the Leyser family who achieved notability during this period, but Michael would be unusual among them in not becoming a theologian. His mother, Sabine, was the daughter of Nikolaus Volckmar (1573-1602), a book dealer who at one stage served as the major of Leipzig.

Michael Leyser began his university career studying Philosophy at Wittenberg, later transferring to Leipzig University where he received his Magister degree in Philosophy. He then switched to Medicine, studying under Thomas Bartholin at Copenhagen, where he mastered the full range of knowledge and experience on the subject of Anatomy. Under the guidance of Bartholin he prepared human skeletons, making them exceptionally clean and white. Bartholin had him appointed Assessor and Pro-rector: Leyser went on to become as one of the most able anatomists of his generation.

At his teacher's instigation, in 1653 he set out the medical requirements and rules which were established among Anatomy teachers, which he published under the title '"Culter anatomicus. Hoc est: Methodus brecis, facilis ac perspicua artificose et compendiose humana incidendi cadavera"'. The book had been republished five times by 1731, and also been translated from Latin into German and English. In this way he disseminated knowledge that had hitherto been held within a restrict circle of experts, but he did not stop there. In the vicious dispute between Bartholin and Olaus Rudbeck over who deserved credit for vital discoveries regarding the Lymphatic system, Rudbeck got to the point of asserting that the person who really deserved the credit was Michael Leyser, for whose discoveries Bartholin had appropriated the credit by publishing the results under his own name.

After publishing his book in 1653 Leyser seems to have abandoned his university career at Copenhagen. Around 1656 he probably moved to Padua where he received his Doctor of Medicine qualification, before returning to Denmark. Here he moved to Lolland and Møn, then setting up in practice as a physician between those two islands at Nykøbing on Falster. It was here that he died, shortly after his marriage, still aged only about 34, on 20 December 1660. The illness that killed him is identified as a " "Febris maligna", a "cold fever" probably caused by Typhus or Plague.

== Output (not a complete list) ==
- Calculo renum et vesice. Kopenhagen 1651.
- Culter anatomicus sive methodus humana corpora fecanda. Kopenhagen 1653. Weitere fünf Auflagen bis 1731, auch ins Englische übersetzt (The art of dissecting the human body…. London 1740.)
- De auditu. Kopenhagen 1653.
- De sphacelo cerebri. Leipzig 1656.
- Observationes medicae virorum clarissimorum. Frankfurt. 1679, posthum veröffentlicht.
- Cultro anatomico. Frankfurt 1679, posthum veröffentlicht.
