= Threefold office =

Christian doctrine about Christ

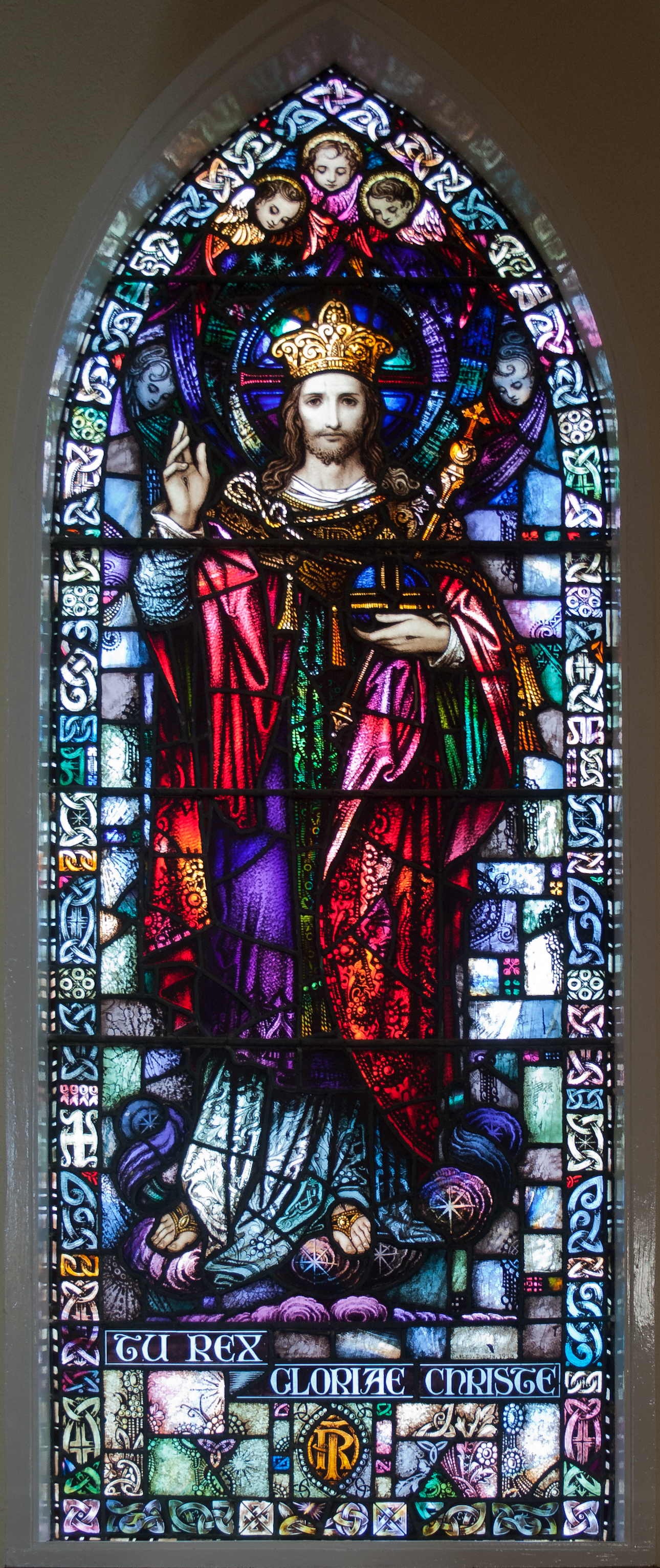
Stained glass window of Christ the King, Tipperary, Ireland

The threefold office (Latin: munus triplex) of Jesus Christ is a Christian doctrine based upon the teachings of the Old Testament of which Christians hold distinct views. It was described by Eusebius, more fully developed by John Calvin, and features in the teaching and practice of a range of Christian denominations.

The doctrine states that Jesus Christ performed three functions (or "offices") in his earthly ministry: those of prophet, priest, and king.

In the Old Testament, the appointment of someone to any of these three positions could be sanctioned by anointing him by pouring oil over his head. Thus the term messiah, meaning "anointed one", is associated with the concept of the threefold office. While the office of king is that most closely associated with the Messiah, the role of Jesus as priest, which involves intercession before God, is also prominent in the New Testament, being most fully explained in chapters 7 to 10 of the Book of Hebrews.

== The three offices ==
Eusebius worked out this threefold classification and wrote: "And we have been told also that certain of the prophets themselves became, by the act of anointing, Christs in type, so that all these have reference to the true Christ, the divinely inspired and heavenly Word, who is the only high priest of all, and the only King of every creature, and the Father’s only supreme prophet of prophets." During the Reformation this concept played a substantial role in scholastic Lutheran Christology and in the christology of reforming theologians such as John Calvin, as well as (later) that of John Wesley.

The entry on the Offices of Christ in the Evangelical Dictionary of Theology claims that Christian theologians view all the other roles of Christ as falling under one of these three distinctions.

== Biblical formulations ==
=== Prophet ===
Christ is the mouthpiece of God as the Prophet by speaking and teaching the Word of God, infinitely greater than all prophets, who spoke for God and interpreted the will of God. The Old Testament prophets brought God's message to the people. Christ, as the Word, the Logos, is the source of revelation. Accordingly, Jesus Christ never used the messenger formula, which linked the prophet's words to God in the prophetic phrase Thus says the Lord.

The New Testament refers to the prophetic role of Christ in the following verses, among others:

- Mark 6:4 – But Jesus said unto them, "A prophet is not without honour, but in his own country, and among his own kin, and in his own house."
- Luke 4:43 – And he said unto them, "I must preach the kingdom of God to other cities also: for therefore am I sent."
- John 14:24 – "These words you hear are not my own; they belong to the Father who sent me."
- John 17:4 – "I have glorified thee on earth: I have finished the work which thou gavest me to do."
- Acts 2:22 – "Ye men of Israel, hear these words: Jesus of Nazareth, a man approved of God among you by miracles and wonders and signs, which God did by him in the midst of you, as ye yourselves also know."

There are several instances in the Bible that suggest that Jesus' contemporaries regarded him as a prophet:

- After raising the widow's son at Nain in Luke 7:16, the witnesses say: "A great prophet has arisen among us!"
- In Luke 24:19, Jesus is called a prophet by the people who do not recognize him when they say: "The things about Jesus the Nazarene, who was a prophet mighty in deed and word in the sight of God and all of the people".

=== Priest ===
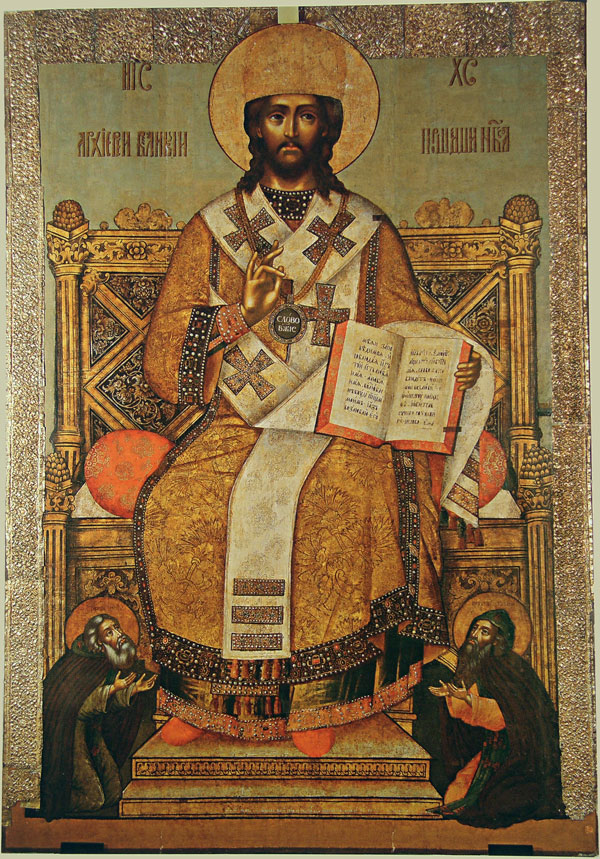
Icon of "Christ the Great High Priest", vested as a bishop, on a bishop's cathedra, blessing as a priest

Christ, whom believers draw near to in confidence, offered Himself as the sacrifice for humanity as High Priest. Old Testament priests declared the will of God, gave the covenant of blessing, and directed the processing of sacrifices. The priest represented humankind before God. While humankind took the office of priesthood in their weakness, Jesus holds the position with an indestructible power that overcomes the weakness of humanity as described throughout the book of Hebrews. The atoning death of Christ is at the heart of his work as High Priest. Metaphors are used to describe his death on the cross, such as, "Christ, the Lamb of God, shed his blood on the cross as the sin offering for humankind." Christ made one sin offering as High Priest in contrast to the Old Testament priests, who continually offered sacrifices on behalf of humanity. Because of the work of Christ on the cross, humanity has the opportunity to have a living relationship with God. Conversely, the individuals that deny the work of God are described as dead in sin, without God and without hope. In traditional Christianity (the Roman Catholic, Eastern Orthodox, Anglican Church, Oriental Orthodox, and Assyrian Churches), it is believed that a priest, having received the Sacrament of Holy Orders through the laying on of hands, shares the one priesthood of Christ, and thus it is only priests (and their superiors in Holy Orders, the bishops) who can offer the Eucharistic Sacrifice.

=== King ===
Christ, exalted High Priest, mediates the sin that estranges humankind from the fellowship of God. In turn, he has full rights to reign over the church and world as King. Christ sits at the right hand of God, crowned in glory as "King of kings and Lord of lords". "God put this power to work in Christ when he raised him from the dead and seated him at his right hand in the heavenly places, far above all rule and authority and power and dominion, and above every name that is named, not only in this age but also in the age to come. And he has put all things under his feet and has made him the head over all things for the church."

In John 21 we see Him revealing His authority over circumstances as King. The disciples are fishing the whole night and cannot catch fish, they are living the curse out mentioned in Genesis 3. Jesus tells them to cast their net on the right hand side and they immediately catch 153 fish. Jesus is King. The place they do this in is also topical, its named Tiberius, the emperor of the day, the king of the day, this is where Jesus reveals Himself as King.

== Theological approaches ==
=== Church fathers ===
In his 5th-century book on gospel harmony Harmony of the Gospels, Saint Augustine viewed the variations in the Gospel accounts in terms of the different focuses of the authors on Jesus: Matthew on royalty, Mark on humanity, Luke on priesthood and John on divinity.

=== Reformed and Presbyterian traditions ===
The Heidelberg Catechism interprets the title "Christ" in terms of the threefold office, in Lord's Day 12, Question and Answer 31:

Q. Why is he called "Christ", meaning "anointed"?

A. Because he has been ordained by God the Father

and has been anointed with the Holy Spirit to be

our chief prophet and teacher

who perfectly reveals to us
the secret counsel and will of God for our deliverance;

our only high priest

who has set us free by the one sacrifice of his body,
and who continually pleads our cause with the Father;

and our eternal king

who governs us by his Word and Spirit,
and who guards us and keeps us
in the freedom he has won for us.

The Westminster Shorter Catechism explains the role of Christ as redeemer in terms of the threefold office:

Q. 23: What offices doth Christ execute as our Redeemer?

Christ, as our Redeemer, executeth the offices of a prophet, of a priest, and of a king, both in his estate of humiliation and exaltation.

Q. 24: How doth Christ execute the office of a prophet?

Christ executeth the office of a prophet, in revealing to us, by his word and Spirit, the will of God for our salvation.

Q. 25: How doth Christ execute the office of a priest?

Christ executeth the office of a priest, in his once offering up of himself a sacrifice to satisfy divine justice, and reconcile us to God, and in making continual intercession for us.

Q.26: How doth Christ execute the office of a king?

Christ executeth the office of a king, in subduing us to himself, in ruling and defending us, and in restraining and conquering all his and our enemies.

=== Lutheranism ===
(a) The prophetical office (munus, or officium propheticum) includes teaching and the miracles of Christ.

(b) The priestly office (munus sacerdotale) consists of the satisfaction made for the sins of the world by the death on the cross, and in the continued intercession of the exalted Savior for his people (redemptio et intercessio sacerdotalis).

(c) The kingly office (munus regium), whereby Christ founded his kingdom, defends his church against all enemies, and rules all things in heaven and on earth. The old divines distinguish between the reign of nature (regnum naturae sive potentiae), which embraces all things; the reign of grace (regnum gratiae), which relates to the church militant on earth; and the reign of glory (regnum gloriae), which belongs to the church triumphant in heaven.

The theologians who followed Martin Luther and Philip Melanchthon down to the mid-17th century treat Christ's saving work under the two heads of king and priest. John Calvin, in the first edition of his Institutes of the Christian Religion (1536), did the same, and it was not until the third edition (1559) and the Genevan Catechism that he fully presented the three offices. The convenient threefold division of the office of Christ was used by the theologians of both confessions during the 17th century. Johann August Ernesti opposed it, but Friedrich Schleiermacher restored it.

=== Roman Catholicism ===
The Catechism of the Catholic Church states that Jesus "fulfilled the messianic hope of Israel in his threefold office of priest, prophet, and king".

The Second Vatican Council's Decree of the Apostolate of the Laity affirmed that lay people "share in the role of Christ as priest, prophet, and king".

== See also ==
- Christology
- Messiah
- Priesthood of Melchizedek
- Typology (theology)
- Trifunctional hypothesis
