= Friedrich Wilhelm von Leysser =

German botanist

Friedrich Wilhelm von Leysser (March 7, 1731 – October 10, 1815); (surname sometimes given as Leyser) was a German botanist who was a native of Magdeburg. He served as counsellor (Kriegsrat and Domänenrat) to the king of Prussia.

He was the author of Flora Halensis (Flora of Halle) (1761), and was the first president of Naturforschende Gesellschaft zu Halle. The plant genus Leyssera (Leysera) from the family Asteraceae is named after him.
