= Georg Scherer =

Georg Scherer (1540 – 30 November 1605) was a Roman Catholic pulpit orator and controversialist.

== Biography ==
Born at Schwaz, in Tyrol, Scherer entered the Society of Jesus in 1559. For over forty years he labored in the Archduchy of Austria. In 1577 he was Court preacher to the Archduke Matthias; he retained the post until 1600. In 1590 he was appointed Rector of the Jesuit College at Vienna; the sternness of his character scarcely fitted him for the office, and he was transferred (1594) to Linz.

Scherer enjoyed lifelong popularity as an orator, beginning before his ordination. A popular anecdote tells of him exclaiming from the pulpit "If the Catholic Church is not the True Church, may I become blind", and being struck blind on the spot. The 1913 Catholic Encyclopedia dismisses this story as "pure invention", but praises Scherer's "boundless energy" and "rugged strength of character".

Scherer vigorously opposed the Tübingen professors who meditated a union with the Greek Schismatics, refuted Lutheran divines like Osiander and Heerbrand, and roused his countrymen against the Turks. He made many converts, amongst them the future Cardinal Khlesl.

In 1605, Scherer died in Linz of apoplexy. His works were collected and published by the Premonstratensians of Bruck, Moravia (1599–1600), and again issued at Munich (1613–1614).

== Witchcraft ==
Believing like his contemporaries that the State had the right to put witches to death, Scherer maintained, however, that since they were possessed, the principal weapons used against them should be spiritual ones, e.g. exorcisms or prayer. Scherer's severe attitude towards witchcraft did not meet the approval of his general, Acquaviva.

In 1583, Scherer played a role in Vienna's one and only case of witch-burning. 70-year-old Elise Plainacher of Mank, Lower Austria, a Lutheran, had raised her granddaughter Anna Schlutterbauer ever since the girl's mother died. When Anna was 17 her father, Elise's Catholic son-in-law, took custody and moved with Anna to St. Pölten. There, the girl suffered seizures, probably epileptic, that were blamed on a hex placed by her grandmother. Anna and Elise were brought to Vienna, where Scherer conducted a rigorous "investigation" (exorcisms combined with interrogation) at St. Barbara's Church in Fleischmarkt. Over the course of several days, Scherer claimed to have discovered 12,652 demons inhabiting Anna's body and spirit. At length the exhausted and confused girl agreed that her grandmother had hexed her. Elise was taken to the notorious Rogues' House (Malefizhaus) at 10 Rauhensteingasse for interrogation under torture. Her eventual confession was so unconvincing that the mayor of Vienna appealed to Emperor Rudolf II to overturn it, but Scherer brought ecclesiastical pressure to bear and the Emperor declined the petition. Elise Plainacher was burned at the stake and her ashes thrown into the Danube on 28 September 1583.
