= Elisabeth Plainacher =

Austrian witch

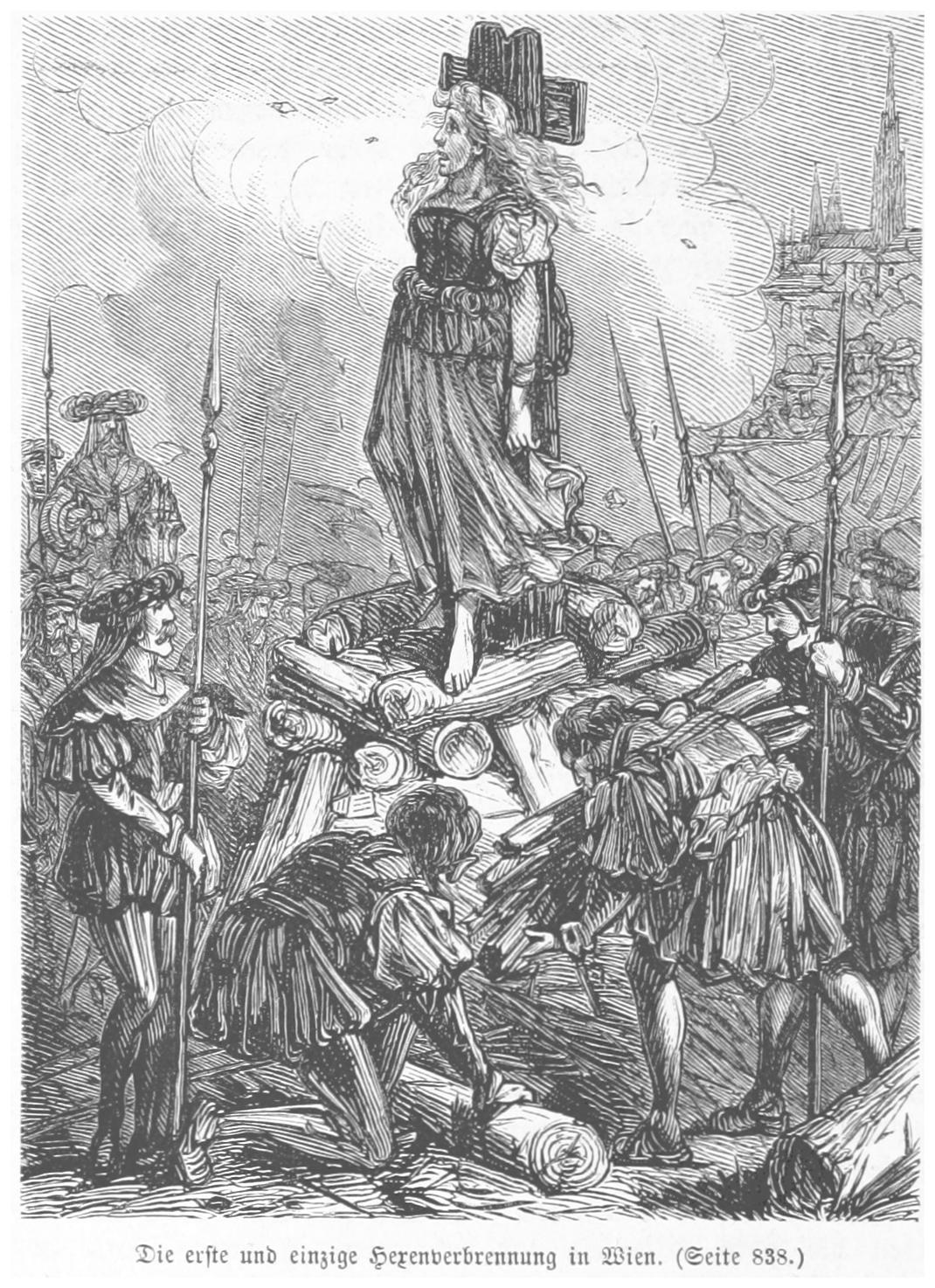
Painting of the burning of Elisabeth Plainacher made in 1880

Elisabeth Plainacher, or Elsa Plainacher (c. 1513 – 27 September 1583), was an alleged witch. She was the only person executed for sorcery in the city of Vienna.

Elsa Plainacher's parents operated a mill in Pielamund by the Danube. She was married three times and had children. When her daughter Margaret died, she became the guardian of her four grandchildren by her. Three of them soon died, and only one, Anna, was left. Anna suffered from epilepsy, which was seen as a sign of the Devil. Elsa was seen as responsible for the sickness of Anna and also for the deaths of her husband and three other grandchildren. Elsa was arrested and taken to Vienna, where her case was overseen by the Jesuit inquisitor Georg Scherer. During the interrogations, she confessed to anything under torture. She was judged guilty and sentenced to be executed by burning.

== Life ==
Elsa Plainacher was born around 1513 as Elisabeth Holtzgassner in Pielamund, a small settlement near the town of Melk in Lower Austria, at the confluence of the Pielach River and the Danube.

Her parents operated a mill on the right bank of the Pielach on behalf of the lordship. The original location of this mill is now silted up and no longer exists. She had several siblings, but only the "Shipman" Vitus Holtzgassner is known by name, who later lived in Melk.

Elsa had an illegitimate child at a very young age with a mill helper named Hoisl, which is a common family name but could also be a variation of a first name. As the child does not appear in her later life story, it is likely that it died early. Child mortality was very high at that time.

Elsa married a miller, about whom nothing else is known except the family name Paumgartner. It is likely that he died early, as divorce was not allowed at that time, and Elsa married a second time. From this marriage, at least two known children were born: Achatius, who took over his father's mill and became wealthy, and Margareth. Elsa married a third time, to a cottager named Plainacher, who probably worked a noble estate as a destitute. This estate was most likely the Gschwendthof in the municipality of Rammersdorf in Lower Austria near St. Pölten. Her landlord was Georg Achaz Mattseber zu Goldegg, and she herself was under the jurisdiction of the Volkert, Freiherr von Auersperg court administration.

Around 1550, her daughter Margareth married farmer Georg Schlutterbauer from Strannersdorf in the municipality of Mank. Margareth and Georg first had three children in succession: Catharina, Ursula and Hensel (Hans). After that, they may not have planned any more children, since there had now been a period of about 10 years without births. Then Anna was born. The mother Margareth died in childbirth. Even before her death, she made her mother promise to take care of the girl, as Georg Schlutterbauer increasingly turned to drinking and became violent. From that point on, a typical mother-in-law-son-in-law conflict probably arose. The three Schlutterbauer children all died (allegedly) in their sleep in the same year. Only Anna, who now lived with her grandmother, survived.

== Witch trial ==
Schlutterbauer began by accusing his mother-in-law, who had converted from Catholicism to Protestantism in Catholic Austria, of being a witch. The accusation was that she wouldn't give him his only child back and was enchanting her more and more. She was supposedly taking her exclusively to Protestant church services and preparing her for the devil. The mentally disabled, epileptic, and pubescent 15-year-old girl at the time couldn't refute the suspicion herself and was considered possessed by the devil by those questioning her. Epilepsy was a strong indication of this at the time. Anna apparently got confused under the pressure of the interrogation, and the results probably corresponded to the wishful thinking of the interrogators. For example, she stated that her grandmother had fed snakes with milk. However, it was probably once a snake that had found its way to the milk that farmers often put for the cats of the farm. She also spoke of a large, black, shaggy man whom her grandmother had introduced to her. Her grandmother supposedly asked, "Annele - do you want him?" This was probably a suitor who had taken a liking to Anna. The clergy exorcised her three times, which apparently did not bring any improvement. After the third exorcism in Vienna, her mental disability was recognized, and she was initially kept in the citizens' hospital. However, Schlutterbauer did not give up. He increasingly pressured the authorities, so that Elsa Plainacher was finally arrested and taken to Vienna in mid-1583. However, the Viennese doctors and priests described her as only old and weak-minded. They pleaded for her to also be taken to the citizens' hospital.

However, preacher Georg Scherer, who was born in Schwaz in Tyrol, appeared on the scene. He gave a hate speech against witches in general and Elsa Plainacher in particular in front of St. Stephen's Cathedral. This stirred up the people, who then demanded that she be tortured to force a confession. In the cellar of the Malefizspitzbubenhaus on Rauhensteingasse in Vienna, the old and sick Elsa Plainacher was subjected to a terrible torture three times, during which she confessed to everything she was asked. She was sentenced to death by burning at the stake and on September 27, 1583, was tied to a board attached to a horse's tail and dragged to the place of execution. The execution site Gänsweyd was located where Kegelgasse now intersects with Weißgerberlände. Elsa Plainacher was burned alive on the stake, fully conscious. Her ashes were scattered in the Danube, now the Danube Canal.

== Aftermath ==
Her granddaughter Anna was placed in the Barbara Convent for Secular Women, which was located on Postgasse in Vienna's 1st district. Her further life fades into the darkness of history. Georg Scherer died in 1605 when he was struck down by a stroke during a similar hate speech in the church pulpit in Linz. Georg Schlutterbauer, who had handed over the farm to his son long before his time, decided to live as a day laborer and inhabitant of a farm near Texing in Lower Austria.
