= Ubiquitarians =

The Ubiquitarians, also called Ubiquists, were a Protestant sect that held that the body of Christ was everywhere, including the Eucharist. The sect was started at the Lutheran synod of Stuttgart, 19 December 1559, by Johannes Brenz (1499–1570), a Swabian. Its profession, made under the name of Duke Christopher of Württemberg and entitled the "Württemberg Confession," was sent to the Council of Trent in 1552, but had not been formally accepted as the Ubiquitarian creed until the synod at Stuttgart.

== Setting ==
Luther had upset the peace of Germany by his disputes. In the effort to reconcile and unite the contending forces against the Turks, Charles V demanded of the Lutherans a written statement of their doctrines. This—the "Augsburg Confession"—was composed by Philip Melanchthon, and read at a meeting at Augsburg in 1530. Its tenth article concerned the Real Presence of Christ in the Blessed Sacrament, a burning question among the Protestants.

In 1540, Melanchthon published another version of the "Augsburg Confession", in which the article on the Real Presence differed essentially from what had been expressed in 1530. The wording was as follows:

- Edition of 1530: "Concerning the Lord's Supper, they teach that the body and blood of Christ are truly present, and are distributed (communicated) to those that eat in the Lord's Supper; and they disapprove of those that teach otherwise."
- Edition of 1540: "Concerning the Lord's Supper, they teach that with bread and wine are truly exhibited the body and blood of Christ to those that eat in the Lord's Supper."

Johann Eck, in a conference at Worms, 1541, was the first to call attention to the change. Debates followed, and the Ubiquitarian controversy arose, the question being: Is the body of Christ in the Eucharist, and if so, why?

The Confession of 1540 was known as the Reformed doctrine. To this, Melanchthon, with his adherents, subscribed and maintained that Christ's body was not in the Eucharist. They maintained this because the Eucharist exists in multiple locations at once, and it is impossible, they contended, for a body to be in many places simultaneously.

Adopting Martin Luther's interpretation of the communicatio idiomatum, Brenz argued that the attributes of the Divine Nature had been communicated to the humanity of Christ which thus was deified. If deified, it was everywhere, ubiquitous, just as His divinity, and therefore really present in the Eucharist. This teaching of Brenz was in partial agreement with the Catholic faith—as to the fact, but not as to the explanation. His assertion that Christ's human nature had been deified, and that His body was in the Eucharist as it was elsewhere, contradicted Catholic teaching and was considered heretical.

== Later events ==
In 1583, Martin Chemnitz, who had unconsciously been defending the Catholic doctrine, calmed the discussion by his adhesion to absolute Ubiquitarianism.

This doctrine appeared again in 1616 under the names of Kenoticism and Crypticism, but sank into oblivion in the troubles of the Thirty Years' War.

== See also ==
- Chalcedonian Creed
- Scholastic Lutheran Christology
