= Jean Sturm Gymnasium =

Independent Protestant school for teenagers and young adults in Strasbourg, France

Coordinates: 48.5838°N 7.7482°E

- Gymnase Jean-Sturm
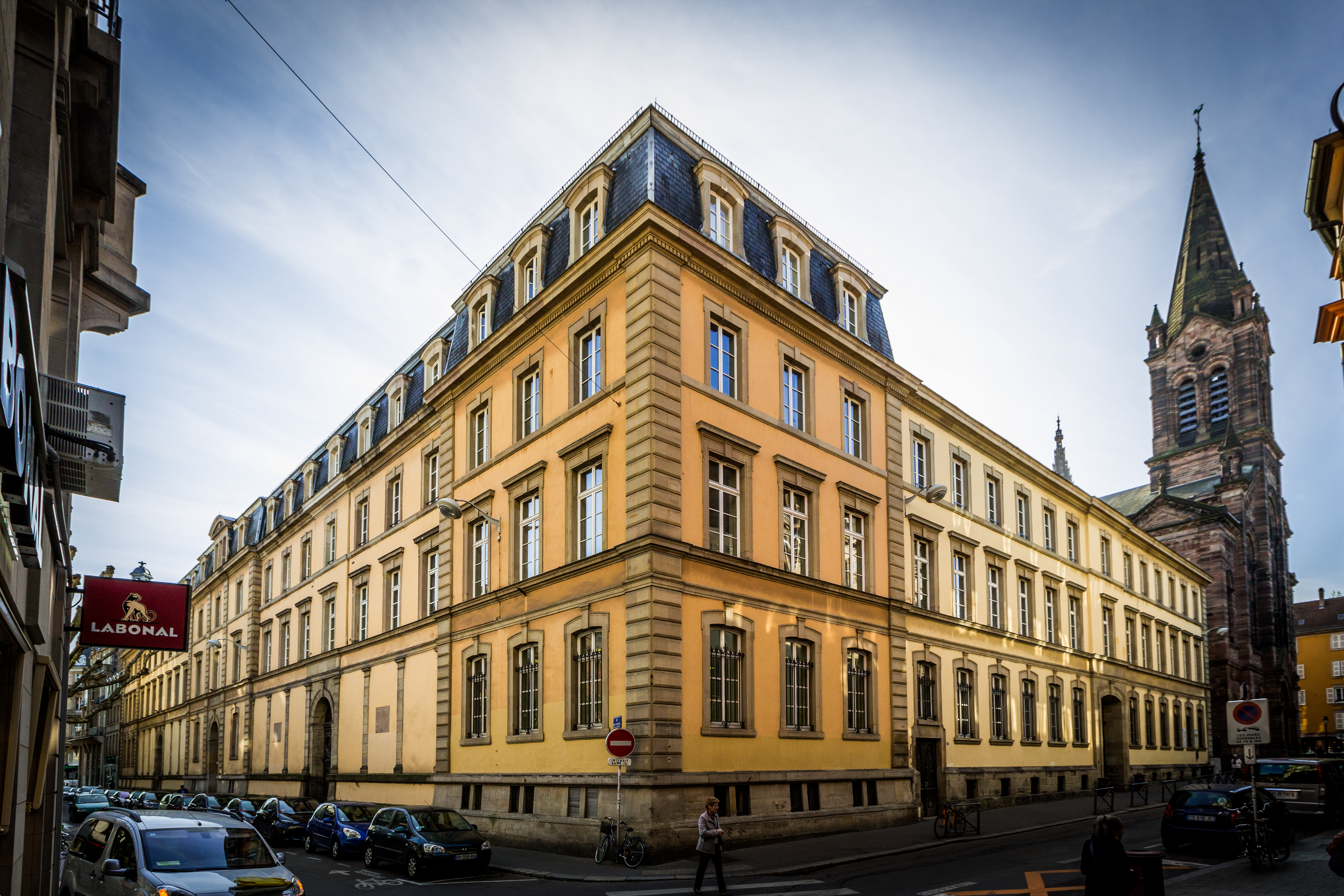
- The Gymnase Jean-Sturm
- 8, place des Étudiants; 67000 Strasbourg; Strasbourg; France

Information
- Type: Private Protestant School
- Religious affiliation: Protestant
- Established: 1538
- Language: French
- Campus: Urban

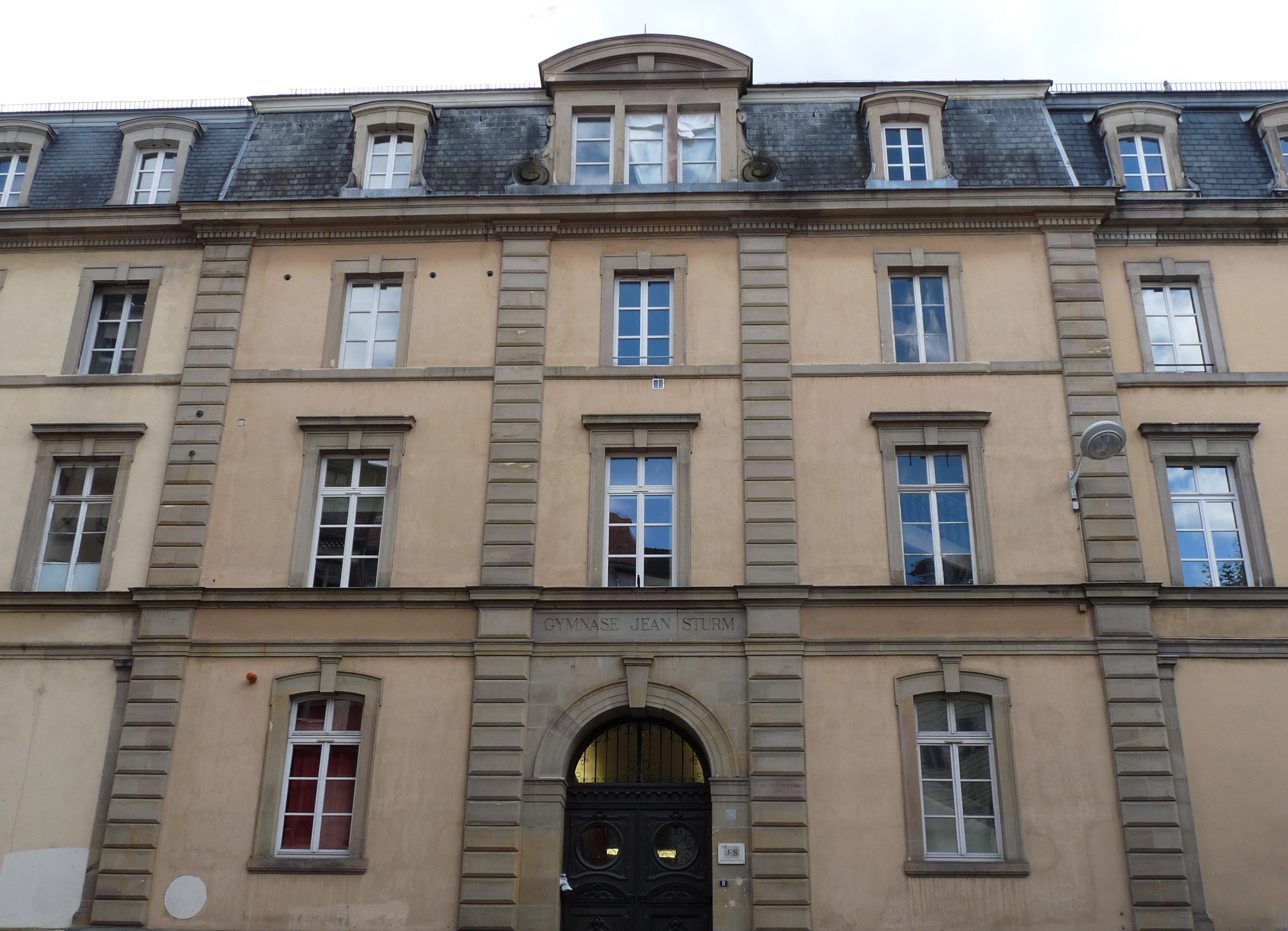
Main entrance

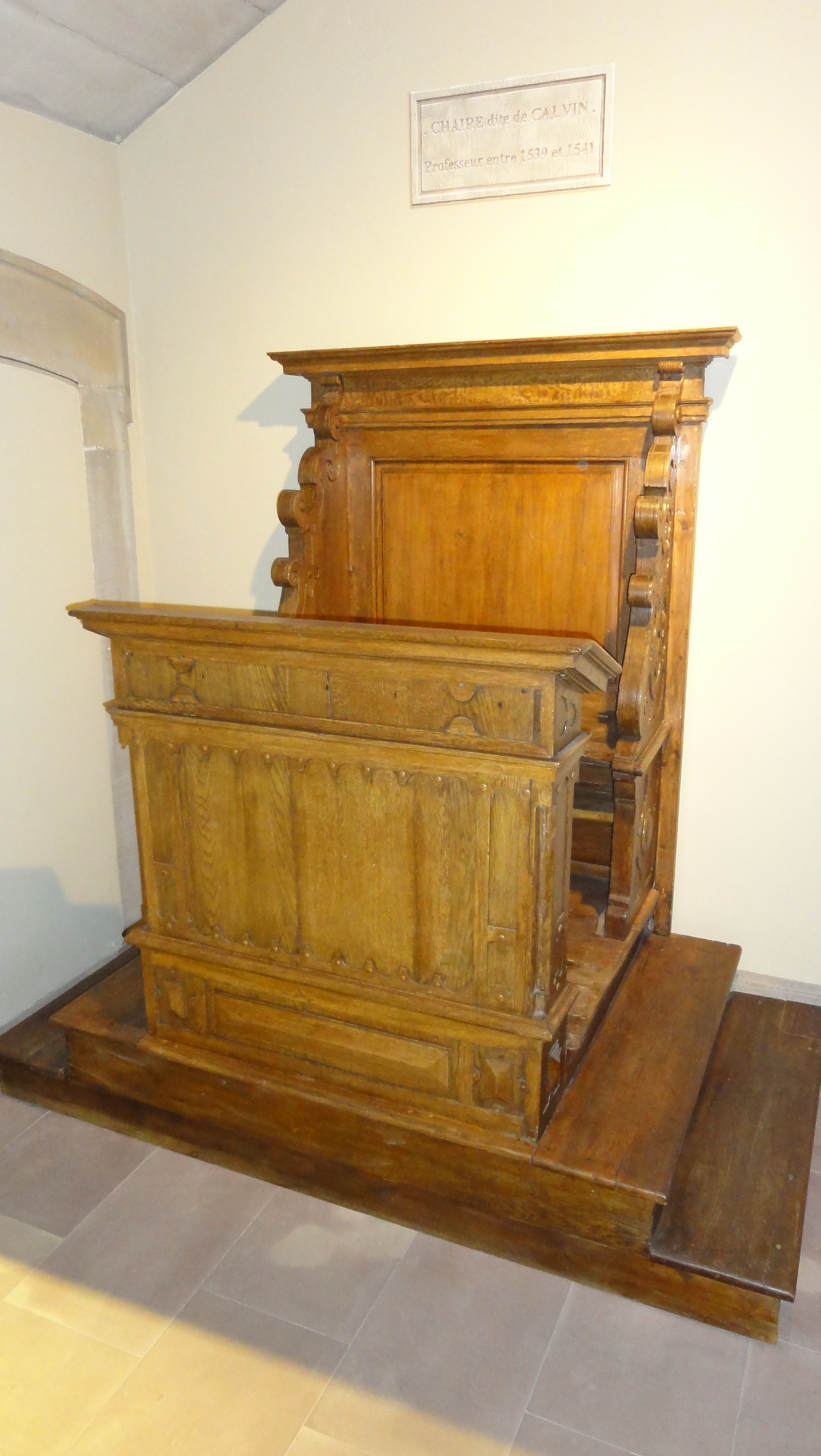
John Calvin's pulpit, kept in the school's premises

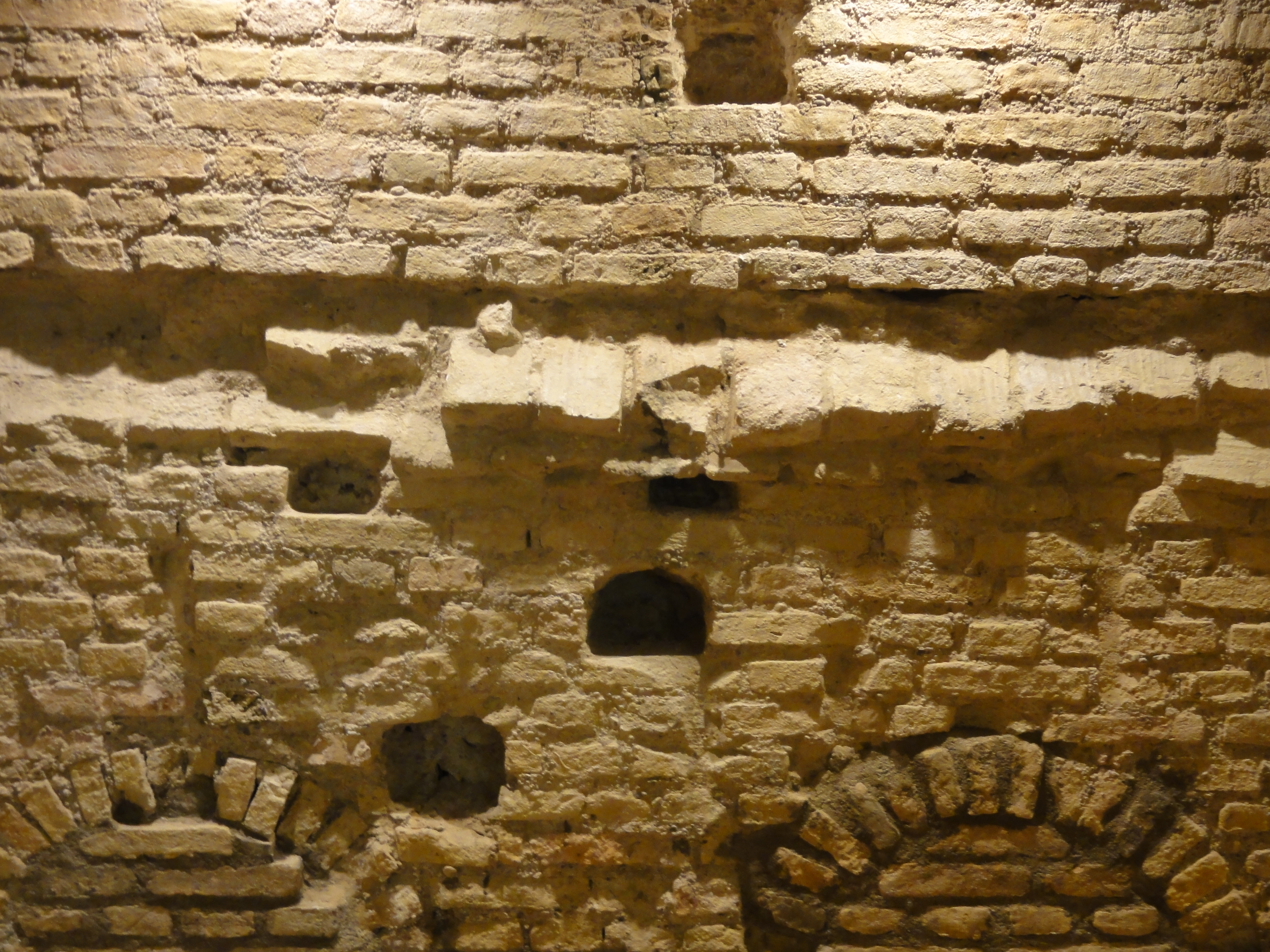
Medieval walls in the cellar

The Jean Sturm Gymnasium (French: Gymnase Jean-Sturm, German: Jean-Sturm-Gymnasium) is a private Protestant school in Strasbourg, teaching children from the third year of secondary education through to the Baccalaureat.

== History ==
The school, which was the precursor of the University of Strasbourg, was founded in 1538 by the humanist Johannes Sturm, just a year after he had arrived in the city. In March 1538, the chief town councillor of Strasbourg, the unrelated Jacob Sturm von Sturmeck, asked Sturm to reorganize education in the city.

In March 1538, Jean Sturm published his treatise De literarum ludis recte aperiendis liber to justify the creation of a unique school in Strasbourg.

The chapter of St Thomas Church in Strasbourg was also involved in the creation of the school. Jean Sturm was the first rector of the school. One of the members of the Chapter of St Thomas, Church of Augsburg Confession of Alsace and Lorraine, is still responsible for ensuring that the religious instruction in the school is given according to the proper Protestant doctrine. The medium of instruction for many years was uniquely in Latin.

The school was set up in its present location, which at the time was part of the Dominican Convent where Meister Eckhart and Joannes Tauler once taught. The original name was Schola Argentoratensis, from Argentoratum, the former Latin name of Strasbourg. From the outset, the school offered teaching in the new humanist tradition. It provided the model for the modern German gymnasium.

In 2005, the school was merged with the Lucie-Berger school, under the name 'Pôle éducatif Jan-Amos-Comenius', enabling the school to extend the age-range of its teaching to cover kindergarten through to the Baccalaureat and making it the largest private Protestant educational institution in France.

Today the school, which has some 2,000 pupils, boasts a 100% success rate in the Baccaleureat.
