= Polycarp (children's TV show host) =

Polycarp (portrayed by John Plauché) is swamped by fan mail, 1967.

Polycarp (/poʊliːˈkɑːrp/ in the Cajun French manner) was a fictional character who was a local children's television show host. His program, Polycarp and Pals, was broadcast from the mid-1960s to the early 1970s on KATC Channel 3 in Lafayette, Louisiana, USA.

== Background ==
Polycarp was portrayed by the KATC employee John Plauché (27 July 1932 – June 1978), hired by KATC in May 1963 and who it credited for the show's originality. "It is a land created through the wonderful imagination of John Plauche, who as Polycarp Phillipe Pecot Number 2, makes our lives a little happier, the world a brighter place [in which] to live." (Polycarp often jokingly warned viewers in his Cajun-accented English, "Don’t ask for Number One 'cuz dat's my daddy and dey don't like him anyway.")

An avuncular Cajun dressed in a plaid shirt, waistcoat and crumpled straw hat, Polycarp lived on a houseboat, the Narcisse Number 3, "somewhere way back in the Anse La Butte Swamp midway between the Parishes of Fantaisie and Réalité", as a KATC newsletter put it in 1967. (In later programs, Polycarp traded his houseboat for a general store.) KATC described Polycarp's imaginary world as "A modern-day 'fairytale' land of happiness and laughter for girls and boys and tall people . . . undoubtedly the happiest place in Acadiana". The station likened his program to "a cruise . . . [through] his small but laughing world of Cajun friends and swamp critters . . . [such as] Maurice Mostique, the giant mosquito with a wingspan of 13¾ feet, [who] sings a pesky song while Ole Blue, the 738½ pound junk-collecting catfish, thumps against the boat as we float along the bayou".

In addition to showing classic Warner Bros. cartoons, the program had original skits and recurring characters. These cincluded T'Toot (a retired Indian fighter), the Crazy Professor (an inventor and graduate emeritus of the University of Pecan Island), Tante Baseline (owner of the Anse La Butte Swamp Gumbo factory), Joycie (a female filling station attendant "who's the world's champion dual-wheel semi-trailer flat-tire fixer"), The Headless Man (who "sent his head out to be cleaned and it was accidentally sent to the Avery Island Pickle Factory instead" and lived in the locked cabin of Polycarp's boat), Doctor Rollingstone ("the hipster swamp doctor who has a transistor radio stuck in his stethoscope), King Simon ("the duly elected boss of the swamp") and the Stumblebum Sheriff (who arrived at the general store each morning and told jokes to Polycarp).

== Popularity ==
KATC noted that, "Polycarp's much loved pals . . . [are] as familiar to the children of Acadiana as Mickey Mouse and Donald Duck" and claimed that Polycarp was "ranked as the top children's TV personality in the state". As evidence of this popularity, Polycarp received over 3,000 letters and postcards from local children over a seven-day period during a fall 1967 Halloween costume giveaway promotion. In October that year, the University of Southwestern Louisiana's Alumni Association, Athletic Association and its band named Polycarp the first "Mr. Acadiana", an honor it bestowed annually during the school's homecoming American football game to the USL alumnus who best "fosters the tradition and the ideals of the school and of the area. . . .". (Plauché had graduated from the university in 1957.) By 1967, Polycarp appeared in Lafayette-area parades driving a restored 1935 International Harvester vegetable truck, dubbed by KATC the "Poly-Car" (a play on the Cajun French pronunciation of "Polycarp").

In 1976, the producer J. D. "Jay" Miller of Crowley, Louisiana, issued a 45 rpm record on his Yule Time record label of Polycarp reading "The Night Before Christmas".

Polycarp 45 RPM record, 1976. Note that John Plauché is credited as the recording's writer, although his name is misspelled.

== Theme song ==
Polycarp's eponymous theme song (rendered "Polycarp Phillip Pecot #II" on the 45 rpm record label) was recorded in 1966 by the local swamp pop musician Johnnie Allan to the tune of The McCoys' 1965 Number 1 hit song "Hang On Sloopy".

== Broadcast schedule ==
In spring 1969, Polycarp and Pals was broadcast for one hour each weekday and Saturday beginning at 7am CST (although on some weekdays it ran for an hour and a half, ending at 8:30am). There is some evidence that a short-lived spin-off program, The Polycarp Palace, was broadcast on Tuesdays from 3:30 to 5:50pm beginning in October 1967.
