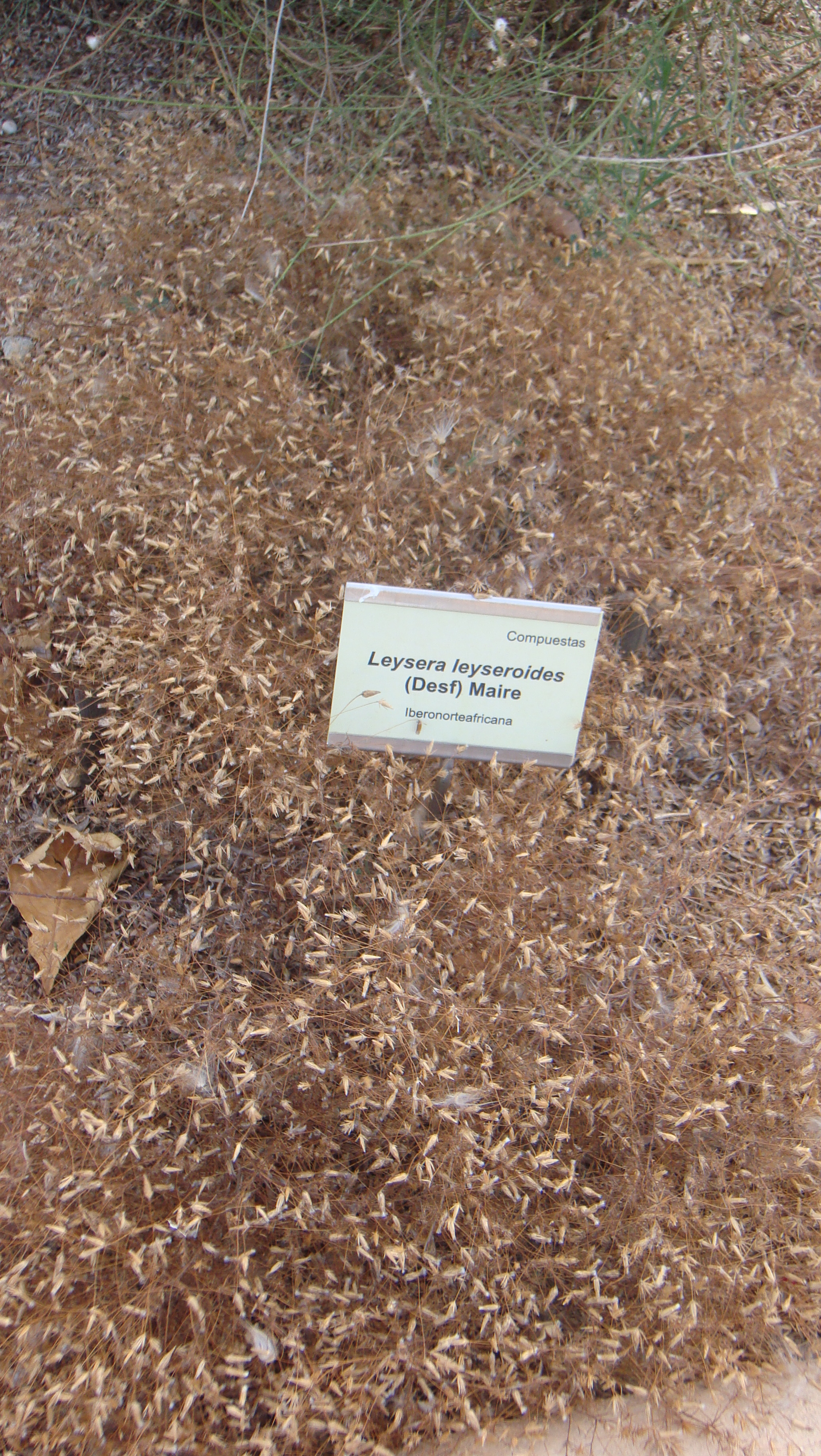
- Laysera leyseroides

Scientific classification
- Kingdom: Plantae
- Clade: Tracheophytes
- Clade: Angiosperms
- Clade: Eudicots
- Clade: Asterids
- Order: Asterales
- Family: Asteraceae
- Subfamily: Asteroideae
- Tribe: Gnaphalieae
- Genus: Leysera; L.

Synonyms
- Leyssera L., alternative spelling; Callicornia Burm.f.; Callisia L. 1760, illegitimate homonym, not Loefl. 1758 (Commelinaceae); Asteropterus Adans.; Leptophytus Cass.

= Leysera =

Genus of flowering plants

Leysera is a genus of African flowering plants in the tribe Gnaphalieae within the family Asteraceae.

Species

- Leysera gnaphalodes (L.) L.
- Leysera gnaphaloides Thunb.
- Leysera leyseroides (Desf.) Maire
- Leysera tenella DC.
