= Johann Marbach =

German Lutheran reformer and controversialist

Johann Marbach (14 April 1521 – 17 March 1581) was a German Lutheran reformer and controversialist.

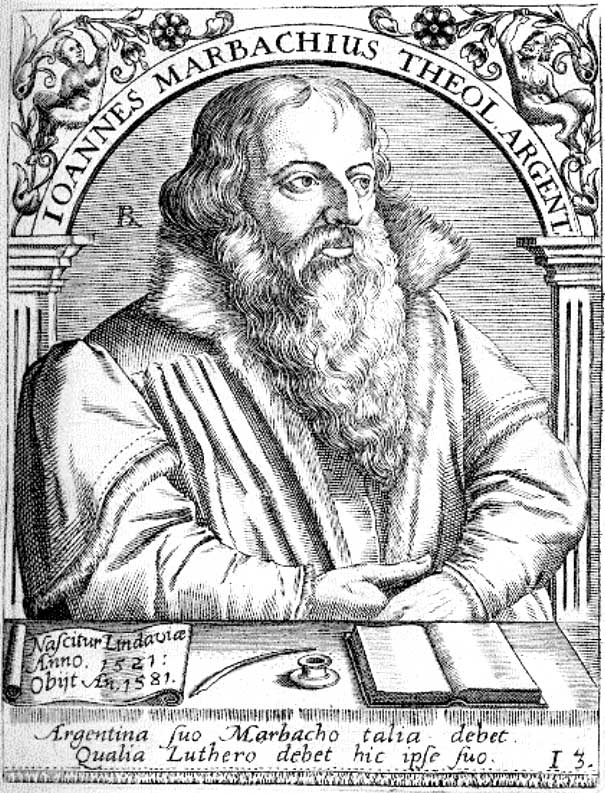
Johann Marbach, engraving by Theodor de Bry.

== Life ==
He was born at Lindau in Bavaria. He began his studies at Strasbourg in 1536, and three years later went to Wittenberg, where he shared a house with Martin Luther and took his doctor's degree in 1543. After holding temporary positions at Jena and Isny, in 1545 he accepted a call to Strasbourg. Here, from 1545 to 1558, he was pastor of the Church of St. Nicholas; canon at St. Thomas' from 1546; professor from 1549, and from 1551 president of the Church Convocation.

In 1551 he was an envoy from Strasbourg to the Council of Trent. Until Martin Bucer's departure for England (1549) Marbach was on good terms with him as the recognized head of the Strasbourg Church, and remained a regular correspondent. Gradually, however, Marbach developed a more exclusive Lutheranism than that represented by other Strasbourg Reformers. In the position to the Swiss, Calvinistic, and Unionistic elements in Strasbourg, Marbach was the leader. The outcome of this conflict was evidenced in the Strasbourg Kirchenordnung of 1598, principally Marbach's work.

From 1553 complaints began against the pastor of the local French refugee Calvinist congregation, Jean Garnier, because he did not hold the doctrine of the Strasbourg church on the Eucharist. He was obliged to leave Strasbourg in 1555. Also that year Peter Martyr, a teacher at the High School, left for Zurich to escape making declarations on the same topic. The last prominent advocate of Unionistic-Calvinistic theology at Strasbourg was Jerome Zanchi, also a teacher of the High School, and a member of the French congregation. When in 1560 Marbach reprinted at Strasbourg the treatise of the Lutheran Tilemann Hesshusen, De præsentia corporis Christi in cœno Domini with the author's vehement preface against Frederick III, Elector Palatine and his theologians in Strasburg, open conflict broke out between Zanchi and Marbach. The main points of contention were the doctrines of the Eucharist, of Ubiquity (just then coming into prominence), and of the perseverance of the elect and predestination. Marbach advocated his views in three major works.

He combatted not only the Calvinists but the Schwenkfeldians and Anabaptists, who were still active at Strasbourg; and introduced the Lutheran catechism (1554). He instituted private confession in the Church of St. Nicholas, and kept up the rite of confirmation when it began to fall into disuse in other Strasbourg churches. Marbach also took an active part in bringing about the acceptance of the Formula of Concord; and prevailed on the Strasbourg theologians to sign the Zerbst Formula (1571), while the official acceptance of the Formula of Concord was opposed by the town council. In the Palatinate he assisted Louis VI in 1576 to restore Lutheranism after the death of Frederick III. He died at Strasbourg.
