= Extra calvinisticum =

Christian doctrine

The extra Calvinisticum is the doctrine that the eternal Son's presence is not limited to his assumed human nature but he maintains his existence also beyond it (etiam extra carnem) perpetually, from the moment of His incarnation. The term extra Calvinisticum was initially used by Lutherans to refer to the use of this concept in Reformed theology. However, the concept is found in the writings of a wide range of pre-Reformation theologians including the Church Fathers.

== History of the term ==
The term extra Calvinisticum (Latin for "the Calvinistic beyond/outside") is a theological terminus technicus given by Lutheran scholastic theologians around 1620. The doctrine is named for and associated with John Calvin, but is commonly found in the Church Fathers and is prominent in Augustine's Christology. E. David Willis demonstrates the existence of this doctrine in the writings of Augustine of Hippo, Peter Lombard, John of Damascus, Gregory of Nazianzus, Thomas Aquinas, Duns Scotus, Gabriel Biel, and Jacques LeFevre d'Estaples. Andrew M. McGinnis furthers the research and demonstrates evidence of the doctrine in the writings of Cyril of Alexandria.

== Overview of the doctrine ==
The Chalcedonian Definition (AD 451) states the following concerning the hypostatic union of the two natures of Christ:

One and the same Christ, Son, Lord, Only-begotten, to be acknowledged in two natures, inconfusedly, unchangeably, indivisibly, inseparably; the distinction of natures being by no means taken away by the union, but rather the property of each nature being preserved, and concurring in one Person and one Subsistence, not parted or divided into two persons, but one and the same Son, and only begotten, God the Word, the Lord Jesus Christ.

Some tensions found within the definition's logic would escalate into controversies during the Protestant Reformation as Lutheran and Reformed theologians set forth opposing doctrines of the person of Christ. The controversy was mainly concerning the human nature of Christ. For example, how does this inconfused, unchangeable, indivisible, inseparable union relate to the omnipresence of Christ? The Reformed understanding of the relationship between the two natures of Christ and his omnipresence is what is usually called the extra Calvinisticum. The extra Calvinisticum teaches that the eternal Son maintains his existence etiam extra carnem (also beyond the flesh) during his earthly ministry and perpetually.

This theological distinction is in contrast to scholastic Lutheran Christology. In the theology of Martin Luther, Jesus Christ is omnipresent not only in his divine nature but also in his human nature, because of the communication of properties (communicatio idiomatum) between those two natures. The Reformed, in contrast to the Lutherans, argued that "the Word is fully united to but never totally contained within the human nature and, therefore, even in the incarnation is to be conceived of as beyond or outside of (extra) the human nature."

James R. Gordon makes a distinction between two versions of the doctrine—the weak and the strong—in the tradition. The weak version simply maintains "that (1) the Son cannot be reduced to Christ’s physical body and (2) there is some form of presence exercised by the Son beyond the Son’s incarnate life in Christ"; and it remains agnostic about the what and the how of the Son's life extra carnem, and it does not make inferences from the fact of the Son's presence beyond Christ's physical body to additional theological ramifications of such presence. The strong version of the doctrine makes further theological claims regarding the specifics of the what and how of the Son's presence beyond the flesh by making the "assertions that (1) the Son is not exhaustively revealed in the person of Christ, (2) the Son simpliciter does not participate in the full range of human experiences of the person of Christ, and (3) the incarnation is contingent to the Son’s life.”

== See also ==
- Chalcedonian Christianity
- Hypostatic union
