= Johannes Brenz =

German Lutheran theologian and Protestant Reformer

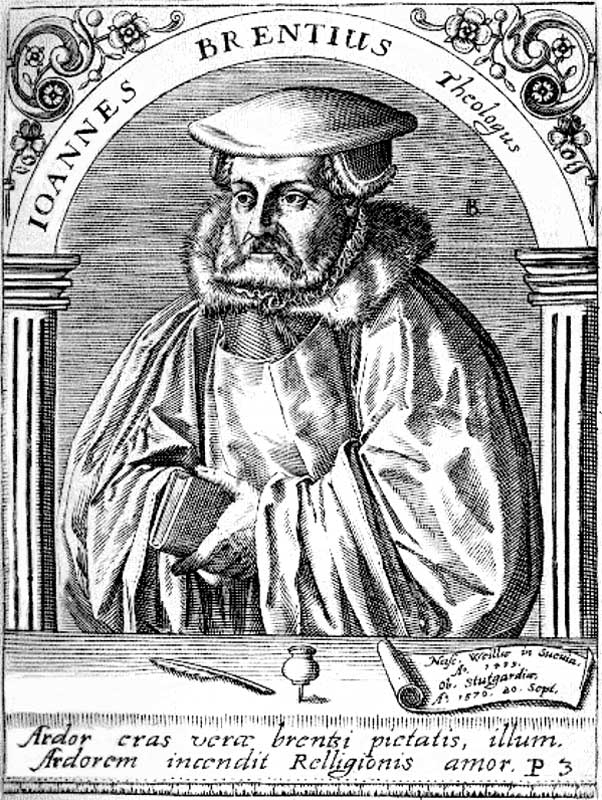
- Born: 24 June 1499; Weil der Stadt (Holy Roman Empire)
- Died: 11 September 1570 (aged 71); Stuttgart (Holy Roman Empire)
- Occupation: Theologian
- Spouse(s): Katharina Brenz

Johann (Johannes) Brenz (24 June 1499 – 11 September 1570) was a German Lutheran theologian and the Protestant Reformer of the Duchy of Württemberg.

== Early advocacy of the Reformation ==
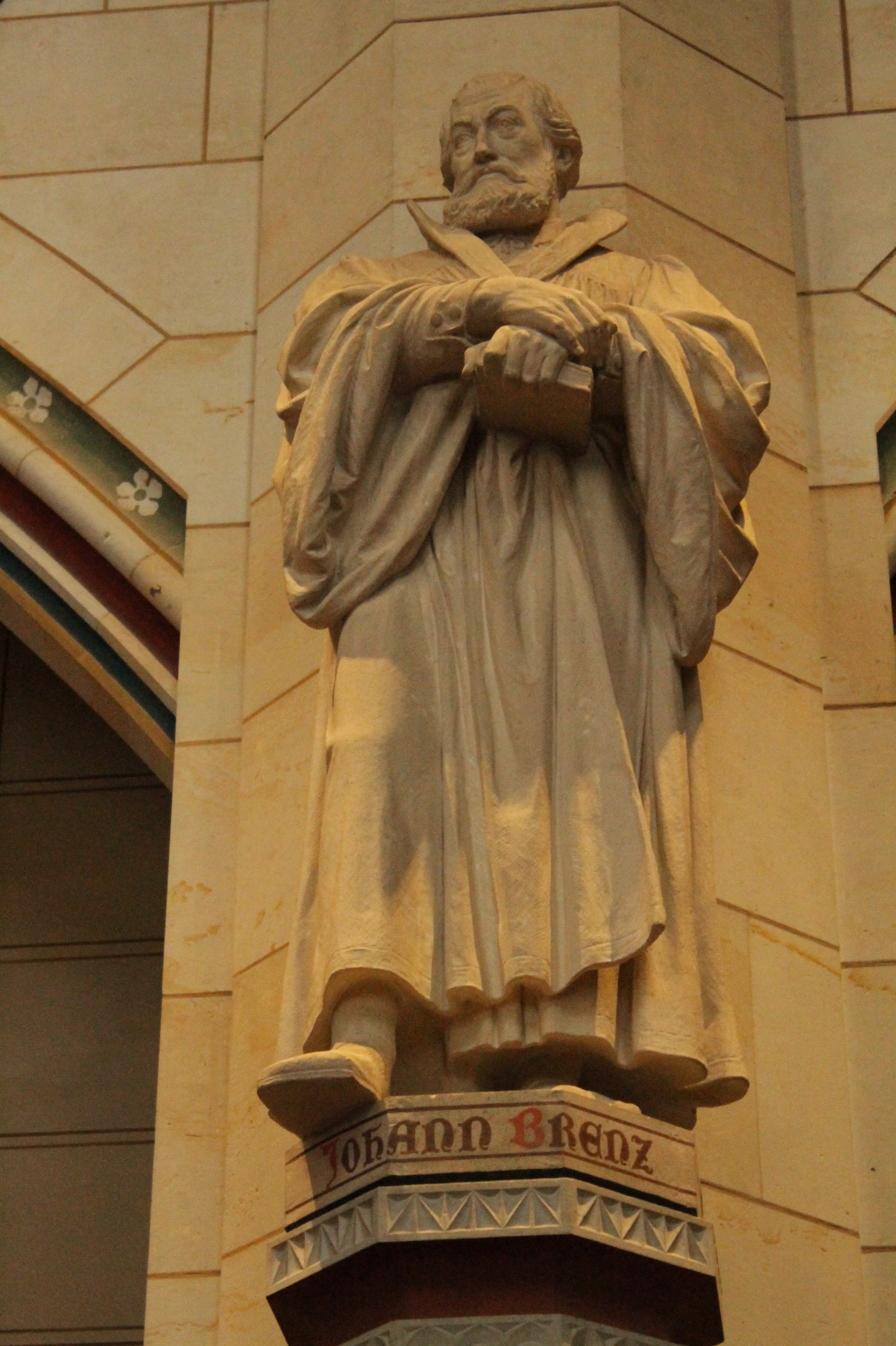
Statue of Johann Brenz, Schlosskirche, Wittenberg

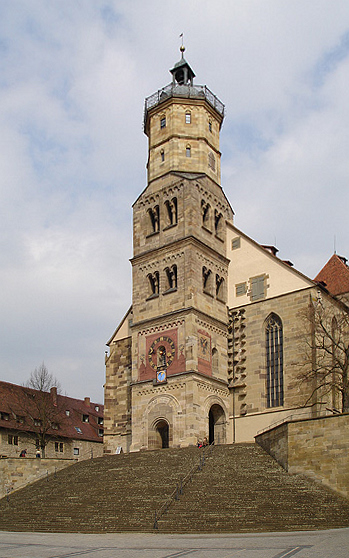
The Michaelskirche in Schwaebisch Hall, where Johannes Brenz served as pastor.

Brenz was born in the then Imperial City of Weil der Stadt, 20 miles west of Stuttgart. He received his education at Heidelberg, where, shortly after becoming magister and regent of the Realistenbursa in 1518, he delivered philological and philosophical lectures. He also lectured on the Gospel of Matthew, only to be prohibited on account of his popularity and his novel exegesis, especially as he had already been won over to the side of Luther, not only through his Ninety-five Theses, but still more by personal acquaintance with him at the disputation at Heidelberg in April 1518. In 1522 Brenz was threatened with a trial for heresy, but escaped through a call to the pastorate of Schwäbisch Hall. In the spring of 1524 he received a strong ally in his activity as a Reformer in Johann Isenmann, who became pastor of the parish-church at Hall. The feast of corpus Christi was the first to be discarded, and in 1524 the monastery of the Discalced Friars was transformed into a school. In the German Peasants' War, on the other hand, Brenz deprecated the abuse of evangelical liberty by the peasants, pleading for mercy to the conquered and warning the magistracy of their duties. At Christmas the Lord's Supper was administered in both kinds, and at Easter of the following year the first regulations were framed for the church and the school. Brenz himself prepared in 1528 a larger and a smaller catechism for the young, both characterized by simplicity, warmth, and a childlike spirit.

== Activity on behalf of the New Movement ==
He first attained wider recognition, however, when he published his Syngramma Suevicum on 21 October 1525, attacking Œcolampadius, and finding the explanation of the creative power of the word of Christ in the theory that the body and blood of Christ are actually present in the Sacrament. Henceforth Brenz took part in all the important conferences on the religious situation. In October 1529 he attended the Colloquy of Marburg, and in the following year, at the request of the Margrave George of Brandenburg, he was present at the diet in Augsburg, where he seconded Melanchthon in his efforts to reach an agreement with the adherents of the ancient faith, but refused all association with the followers of Zwingli. In 1532 he collaborated in the church-regulations of Brandenburg and Nuremberg, and furthered the Reformation in the margravate of Brandenburg-Ansbach, Dinkelsbühl, and Heilbronn, while three years later Duke Ulrich of Württemberg called him as an adviser in the framing of regulations for the church, visitations, and marriage. In February 1537 he was at Schmalkald, and two months later undertook the difficult but successful task of the reformation of the University of Tübingen. He likewise attended the conference on the use of images held at Urach in September 1537, where he urged their abolition. Brenz returned to Hall in April the following year; in June 1540 attended the conference at Hagenau; was at Worms in the latter part of the same year; and in January 1546 was at Regensburg, where he was obliged to deal with Cochlæus, although, as he had foreseen, he was unsuccessful. He devoted himself with great zeal to his pastoral duties, and side by side with his sermons was evolved a valuable series of expositions of Biblical writings.

== Opposed by the Emperor ==
After the last remnants of the ancient regulations of the church of Hall had been abolished, his new rules appeared in 1543. Calls to Leipzig in 1542, to Tübingen in 1543, and to Strasbourg in 1548 were declined in favor of his position at Hall. Brenz had long opposed the adherence of Hall and the margrave to the Schmalkaldic League, since he regarded resistance to the temporal authorities as inadmissible. Gradually, however, his views changed, through the hostile attitude of the emperor. In 1538 Hall entered the league, and after its defeat Charles V came to the city (on 16 December 1546) and obtained possession of papers, letters, and sermons of Brenz, who, despite the bitter cold, was obliged to flee, although he returned on 4 January 1547. The new Augsburg Interim of the emperor, which Brenz called interitus ("ruin"), recalled him to the scene of action, and he earnestly opposed its adoption. The imperial chancellor, Antoine Perrenot de Granvelle, demanded his surrender, and Brenz, warned by a note reading: "Flee, Brenz, quickly, more quickly, most quickly!" escaped on the evening of his forty-ninth birthday, 24 June 1548. He hastened to Duke Ulrich, who concealed him in the castle of Hohenwittlingen near Urach, where, under the pseudonym of Joannes Witlingius, he prepared an exposition of Ps. xciii and cxxx. As the emperor was everywhere searching for him, Ulrich sent him by way of Strasbourg to Basel, where he was kindly received and found time to write an exposition of the prophecy of Isaiah. Duke Christopher called him to Montbéliard, where, in January 1549, Brenz was notified of the death of his wife. The condition of his children induced him to go to Swabia, but owing to the pursuit of the emperor, he was often in great danger, and the duke sheltered him in the castle of Hornberg near Gutach. There he spent eighteen months under the name of Huldrich Engster (Encaustius), always active for the welfare of the Church, both by his advice to the duke and his theological labors. He declined calls to Magdeburg, Königsberg, and England. In August 1549 he ventured to go to Urach, where his friend Isenmann was now minister, in order to take counsel with the duke, his advisers, and Matthaeus Alber, regarding the restoration of the evangelical divine service. In the autumn of 1550 he married his second wife Catherine, the oldest daughter of Isenmann.

== Activity, 1550–53 ==
After Ulrich's death Brenz was asked to prepare the confessio Wirtembergica for the Council of Trent, and with three other Wittenberg theologians and Johann Marbach of Strasbourg, he went to Trent in March 1552 to defend his creed (see Jakob Beurlin). Great was the surprise of the fathers of the council, but they refused to be instructed by those who were to obey them. The Interim was abolished. Brenz who had thus far lived at Stuttgart, Tübingen, Ehningen, and Sindelfingen as counselor of the duke, was made provost of the Cathedral of Stuttgart on 24 September 1554 and appointed ducal counselor for life. He was now the right hand of duke Christoph in the reorganization of ecclesiastical and educational affairs in Württemberg. The great church order of 1553–59, containing also the confessio Wirtembergica, in spite of its dogmatism, is distinguished by clearness, mildness, and consideration. In like manner, his Catechismus pia et utile explicatione illustratus (Frankfort, 1551) became a rich source of instruction for many generations and countries. The proposition made by Kaspar Leyser and Jakob Andreä, in 1554 to introduce a form of discipline after a Calvinistic model was opposed by Brenz, since he held that the minister should have charge of the preaching, the exhortation to repentance, and dissuasion from the Lord's Supper, whereas excommunication belonged to the whole church. At the instance of the duke, Brenz moved in 1553 to Neuburg, to arrange the church affairs of the Palatinate.

== Controversies ==
The Osiandric controversy about the doctrine of justification, in 1551 and the following years, which caused a scandalous schism in Prussia, was a cause of much annoyance and defamation to Brenz, who saw in this controversy nothing but a war of words. In 1554–1555 the question of the Religious Peace of Augsburg occupied his mind; in 1556 the conference with Johannes a Lasco, in 1557 the Frankenthal conference with the Anabaptists and the Worms Colloquy; in 1558 the edict against Schwenckfeld and the Anabaptists, and the Frankfort Recess; in 1559 the plan for a synod of those who were related to the Augsburg Confession and the Stuttgart Synod, to protect Brenz's doctrine of the Lord's Supper against Calvinistic tendencies; in 1563 and 1569 the struggle against Calvinism in the Electorate of the Palatinate (Maulbronn Colloquy) and the crypto-Calvinistic controversies. The attack of the Dominican Peter a Soto upon the Württemberg Confession in his Assertio fidei (Cologne, 1562) led Brenz to reply with his Apologia confessionis (Frankfort, 1555). In 1558 he was engaged in a controversy with Bishop S. Hosius of Ermland. The development of the Reformation in the Palatinate led the aged man to a vehement renewal of his negotiation with Bullinger, with whom he had been forced into close relation through the Interim. The question concerned the doctrine of the Lord's Supper and also involved a peculiar development of Christology, which was opposed by the Lutheran theologians outside of Württemberg, since Brenz carried to its logical conclusion the concept of "personal union," thus favoring an absolute omnipresence (ubiquity) of the body of Christ, which did not begin with the ascension but with the incarnation.

== Later years ==
Brenz took a lively interest in the Waldensians and the French Protestants. But all efforts in behalf of the latter, the journey of the Württemberg theologians to Paris to advise King Antony of Navarre in 1561 (see Jakob Beurlin), the meeting of the duke and Brenz with Cardinal Guise of Lorraine at Saverne, the correspondence and the sending of writings, all ended in bitter disappointment. The Protestants of Bavaria, who had to suffer under Albert, also had his full sympathy. To the citizens of Strasbourg Brenz expressed his doubts as to the advisability of following the procession with the monstrance and advised them not to attend Roman Catholic mass. He was also deeply interested in the Protestants in Austria, for whom the first Slavic books were then printed at Urach. His last Reformatory activity was the correspondence with Duke William of Jülich and Julius of Brunswick-Wolfenbüttel (1568–69). In addition to this he continued his exposition of the Psalms and other Biblical books, which he had commenced at Stuttgart. In 1569 he was paralyzed, and his strength was broken. He died in Stuttgart and was buried beneath the pulpit of the cathedral; but the Jesuits demolished his grave.

== Translated works ==
- Where Faith Comes From, a sermon by Johannes Brenz. Tr. by Jacob C. Behnken.
- Godly magistrates and church order
- Homily on John 15:26-27, translated by Nathaniel J. Biebert (Red Brick Parsonage, 2014).
