= Jacob Sturm von Sturmeck =

German statesman (1489–1553)

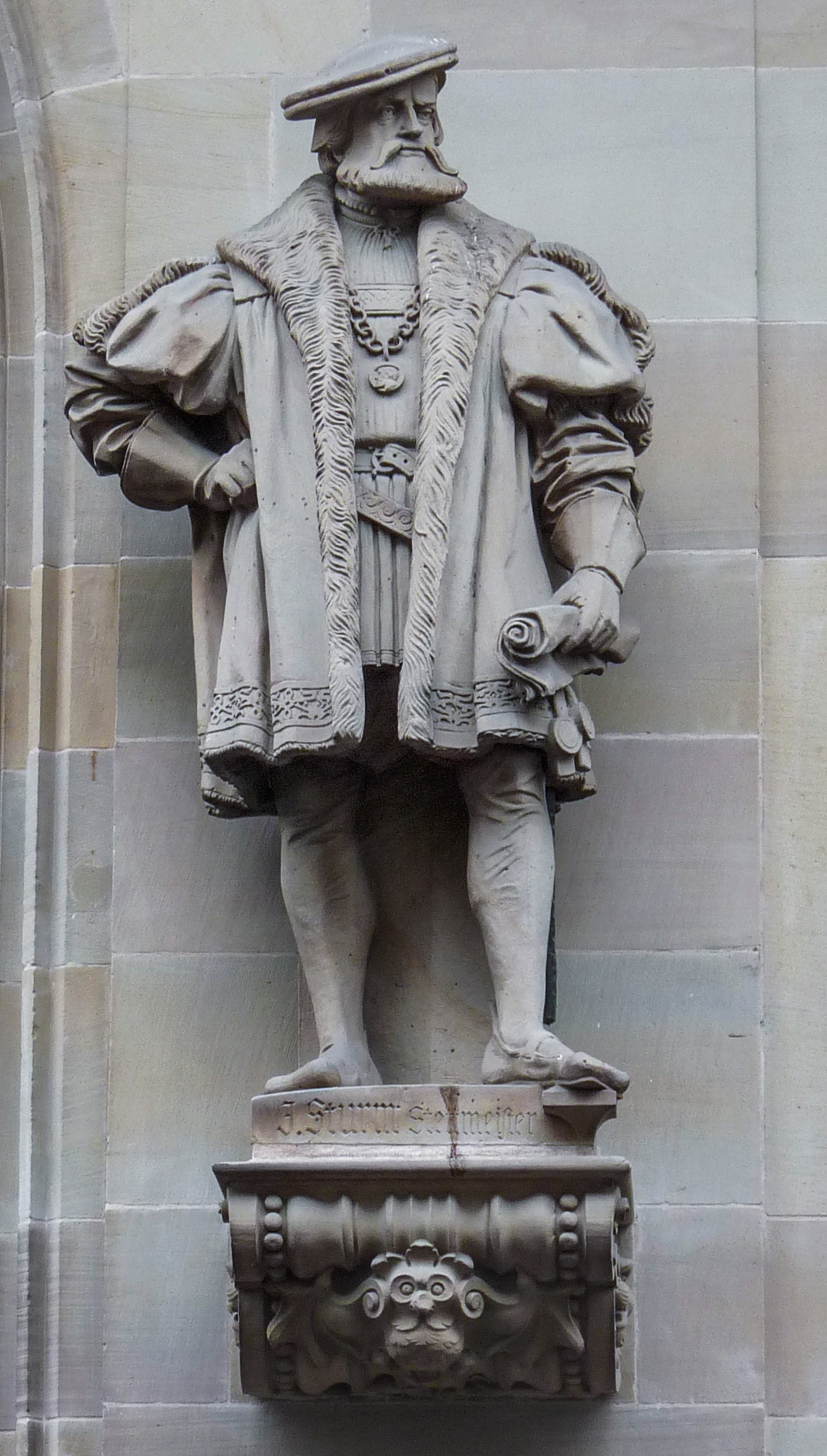
- Statue of Sturm in Strasbourg, by sculptor Alfred Marzolff.
- Born: 10 August 1489; Straßburg, Holy Roman Empire
- Died: 30 October 1553 (aged 64); Straßburg, Holy Roman Empire
- Occupation: Statesman
- Parent: Martin Sturm (father)

Jacob (or Jakob or James or Jacques) Sturm von Sturmeck (10 August 1489 – 30 October 1553) was an Alsatian statesman, one of the preeminent promoters of the Protestant Reformation in Germany.

== Biography ==
Sturm was born at Strasbourg, where his father, Martin Sturm, was a person of some importance.

He was educated at the universities of Heidelberg and Freiburg, and about 1517 he entered the service of Henry, provost of Strasbourg (d. 1555), a member of the Wittelsbach family. He soon became an adherent of the reformed doctrines, and leaving the service of the provost became a member of the governing body of his native city in 1524.

He was responsible for the policy of Strasbourg during the German Peasants' War; represented the city at the Diet of Speyer in 1526; and at subsequent Diets gained fame by his ardent championship of its interests. As an advocate of union among the Protestants he took part in the conference at Marburg in 1529; but when the attempts to close the breach between Lutherans and Zwinglians failed, he presented the Confessio tetrapolitana, a Zwinglian document, to the Augsburg Diet of 1530. As the representative of Strasbourg Sturm signed the protest which was presented to the Diet of Speyer in 1529, being thus one of the original Protestants. He was on friendly terms with Philip, landgrave of Hesse.

Owing largely to his influence, Strasbourg joined the Schmalkaldic League in 1531. The troops of Strasbourg took the field when the league attacked Charles V in 1546; but in February 1547 the citizens were compelled to submit, when Sturm succeeded in securing very favourable terms from the emperor. He was also able to obtain for his native city some modification of the Interim issued from Augsburg in May 1548. Sturm is said to have been in the pay of Francis I of France, but this seems very unlikely. He founded the Bibliothek in Strasbourg, where he died.
