= Communicatio idiomatum =

Christological concept

Communicatio idiomatum (Latin: communication of properties) is a Christological (Note: The adjective Christological can be used in two different ways. Here it is used in the narrow sense as defined in this sentence. It can also be used for the much wider range of doctrines which were traditionally labelled the "Person and Work of Jesus Christ".) concept about the interaction of deity and humanity in the person of Jesus Christ. It maintains that in view of the unity of Christ's person, his human and divine attributes and experiences might properly be referred to the divine Person (God the Son) in terms of his other nature. For example, the theologian may speak of "the suffering of God".

The germ of the idea is first found in Ignatius of Antioch (c. AD 100) but the development of an adequate, agreed technical vocabulary only took place in the fifth century with the First Council of Ephesus in 431 and the Council of Chalcedon twenty years later and the approval of the doctrine of the hypostatic union of the two distinct natures of Christ. In the sixteenth century, the Reformed and Lutheran churches disagreed with each other on this question.

The philosopher J. G. Hamann argued that the communicatio idiomatum applies not just to Christ, but should be generalised to cover all human action: "This communicatio of divine and human idiomatum is a fundamental law and the master-key of all our knowledge and of the whole visible economy."

== Developments in the Patristic period ==
Ignatius of Antioch emphasised both the oneness of Christ and the reality of his twofold mode of existence: "There is one physician, composed of flesh and spirit, generate and ingenerate, God in man, authentic life from death, from Mary and from God, first passible then impassible, Jesus Christ our Lord", but he uses phrases like 'the blood of God', 'the suffering of my God' and 'God ... was conceived by Mary'; Tertullian (c. AD 200) stated that the saviour was composed of two 'substances' and the human substance was in every respect genuine. He was the first theologian to tackle the question of the relationship between them; each preserved its particular qualities but Christians observe "a twofold condition, not confused but conjoined, Jesus, in one Person at once God and man". On the whole he referred what the one person experienced to the appropriate substance, but at times uses phrases such as "God was truly crucified, truly died". thus anticipating the doctrine of communicatio idiomatum.

When the question as to how deity and humanity could be combined in the Saviour was investigated in depth, two schools of thought emerged: one associated with Alexandria and the other with Antioch. Alexandrian thought drew heavily on Platonism and was markedly dualist, while its biblical exegesis was mystical and allegorical. Its Christology has been labelled the Word-flesh model. It took no real account of a human soul in Christ, but viewed the incarnation as the union of the Word with human flesh, thus drawing on the Platonic concept of the human being as a soul which inhabited an essentially alien body. Antiochene thought was based far more on Aristotelian principles and its biblical exegesis tended to be literal and historical thus taking the genuine humanity of the Saviour very seriously. The traditional label for this second type of Christology is Word-man: the Word united himself with a complete humanity, i.e. soul plus body, which did justice to the genuinely human being described in the Gospels. The Antiochene-style Christology stresses the distinction of natures and therefore a more tightly regulated communication of properties; while the Alexandrian-type Christology underscores the unity of Jesus Christ and therefore a more complete communication of properties.

== Lutheran–Reformed debate ==
Reformed and Lutheran Christians are divided on the communicatio idiomatum. In Reformed doctrine, the divine nature and the human nature are united strictly in the person of Christ. According to his humanity, Jesus Christ remains in heaven as the bodily high priest, even while in his divine nature he is omnipresent. This coincides with the Calvinistic view of the Lord's Supper, the belief that Christ is truly present at the meal, though not substantially and particularly joined to the elements (pneumatic presence). Lutherans, on the other hand, describe a union in which the divine and the human natures share their predicates more fully. Lutheran scholastics of the 17th century called the Reformed doctrine that Christ's divine nature is outside or beyond his human nature the extra calvinisticum. They spoke of the genus maiestaticum, the view that Jesus Christ's human nature becomes "majestic", suffused with the qualities of the divine nature. Therefore, in the eucharist the human, bodily presence of Jesus Christ is "in, within, under" the elements (sacramental union).
