= Polykarp Leyser II =

German Lutheran theologian and superintendent

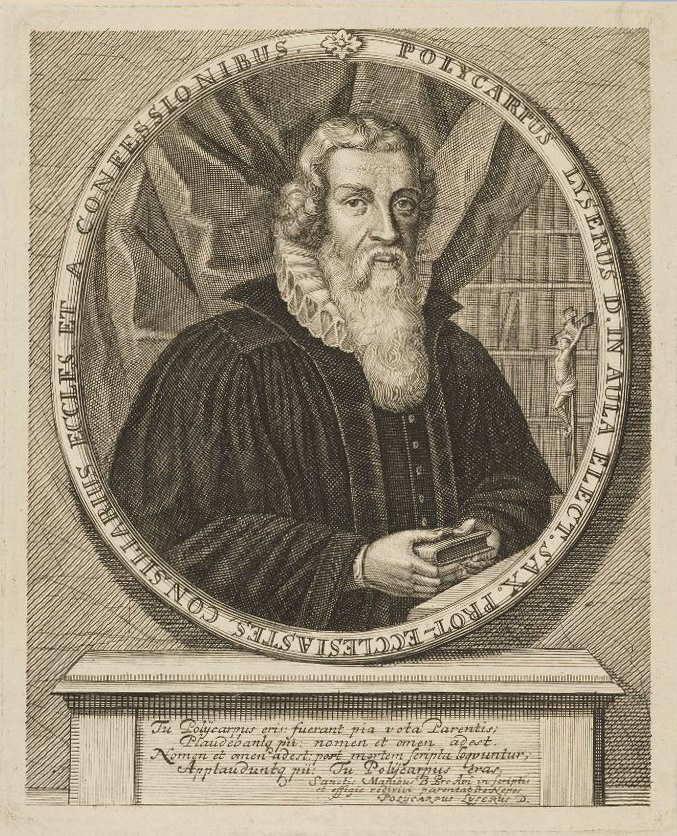
Polykarp Leyser II, German Lutheran theologian and superintendent in Leipzig (1586–1633)

Polykarp Leyser II (20 November 1586, Wittenberg - 15 January 1633, Leipzig) was a German Lutheran theologian and superintendent in Leipzig.

Lesyer became Professor of Theology at Wittenberg in 1610; he stayed there for three years, then became Professor of Theology at Leipzig, a post which he held until his death.

== Life ==
=== Provenance ===
His father Polykarp Leyser the Elder, was a theologian. His mother was Elisabeth, daughter of the painter Lucas Cranach the Younger. Two of his brothers, Friedrich and Wilhelm, were also theologians.

== Family ==
He was the father of nine recorded children, most of whom became theologians. His son, Johann Leyser, was also a theologian, but found himself cut off from his family for his controversial defense of polygamy. One of Polykarp's sons, however, Michael Leyser became a physician and anatomist, making important contributions to documenting the medical advances of the time, notably in respect of the Lymphatic system.

His grandson Polykarp Leyser III and his great-grandson Polykarp Leyser IV were all also theologians.

== Bibliography ==
- Biography in Allgemeine Deutsche Biographie
- "Entry". Zedlers Universallexikon. Vol. 17. p. 382.
- Erdmann Hannibal Albrecht: Sächsische evangelisch-luther’sche Kirchen- und Predigengeschichte, von ihrem Ursprung an die bis auf gegenwärtige Zeiten. Leipzig 1799, S. 61, (GoogleBooks)
