= Martin Crusius =

German classicist and historian

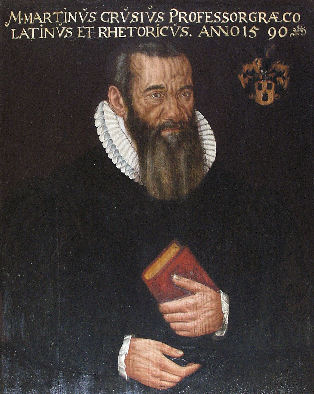
Portrait of Crusius Bildnis, copy of an original painting by Anton Ramsler, 1590

Martin Kraus (Gräfenberg, 19 September 1524 – Tübingen, 7 March 1607), commonly Latinized as Crusius, was a German classicist and historian, and long-time professor (1559–1607) at the University of Tübingen. He was a follower of Philip Melanchthon and wrote an epitome of Melanchthon's Elementorum rhetorices libri duo. Kraus also wrote a commentary on the Iliad.

== Sources ==
- Karl Klüpfel (1876). "Crusius, Martin" . Allgemeine Deutsche Biographie (in German). Vol. 4. Leipzig: Duncker & Humblot. pp. 633–634.
- Klaus-Henning Suchland: Das Byzanzbild des Tübinger Philhellenen Martin Crusius (1526–1607). PhD dissertation. Würzburg 2001
- Panagiotis Toufexis: Das Alphabetum vulgaris linguae graecae des deutschen Humanisten Martin Crusius (1526–1607). Ein Beitrag zur Erforschung der gesprochenen griechischen Sprache im 16. Jh. (PhD dissertation, Hamburg 2003). Romiosini, Cologne 2005, ISBN 3-929889-71-4
- Hans Widmann (1957). "Crusius, Martin". Neue Deutsche Biographie (in German). Vol. 3. Berlin: Duncker & Humblot. pp. 433–434. (full text online).
- Johannes Michael Wischnath: "Fakten, Fehler und Fiktionen. Eine forschungsgeschichtliche Fußnote zu Herkunft und Todestag des Tübinger Gräzisten Martin Crusius (1526–1607)". In: Tubingensia. Impulse zur Stadt- und Universitätsgeschichte. Festschrift für Wilfried Setzler zum 65. Geburtstag. Jan Thorbecke Verlag, Ostfildern 2008, ISBN 978-3-7995-5510-4, pp. 225–246
- Gerhard Philipp Wolf: "Martin Crusius (1526–1607). Philhellene und Universitätsprofessor." In: Erich Schneider: Fränkische Lebensbilder. Vol. 22. Gesellschaft für Fränkische Geschichte, Würzburg 2009, ISBN 978-3-86652-722-5, pp. 103–119.
- Crusius, (Martinus). In: Johann Heinrich Zedler: Grosses vollständiges Universal-Lexicon Aller Wissenschafften und Künste. Vol. 6, Leipzig 1733, col. 1767.
- Walther Ludwig: Hellas in Deutschland – Darstellungen der Gräzistik im deutschsprachigen Raum aus dem 16. und 17. Jahrhundert. Vandenhoeck & Ruprecht, Göttingen 1998, ISBN 3-525-86295-4
