= Polykarp Leyser III =

German Lutheran theologian, superintendent, chaplain (Oberhofprediger) and orientalist

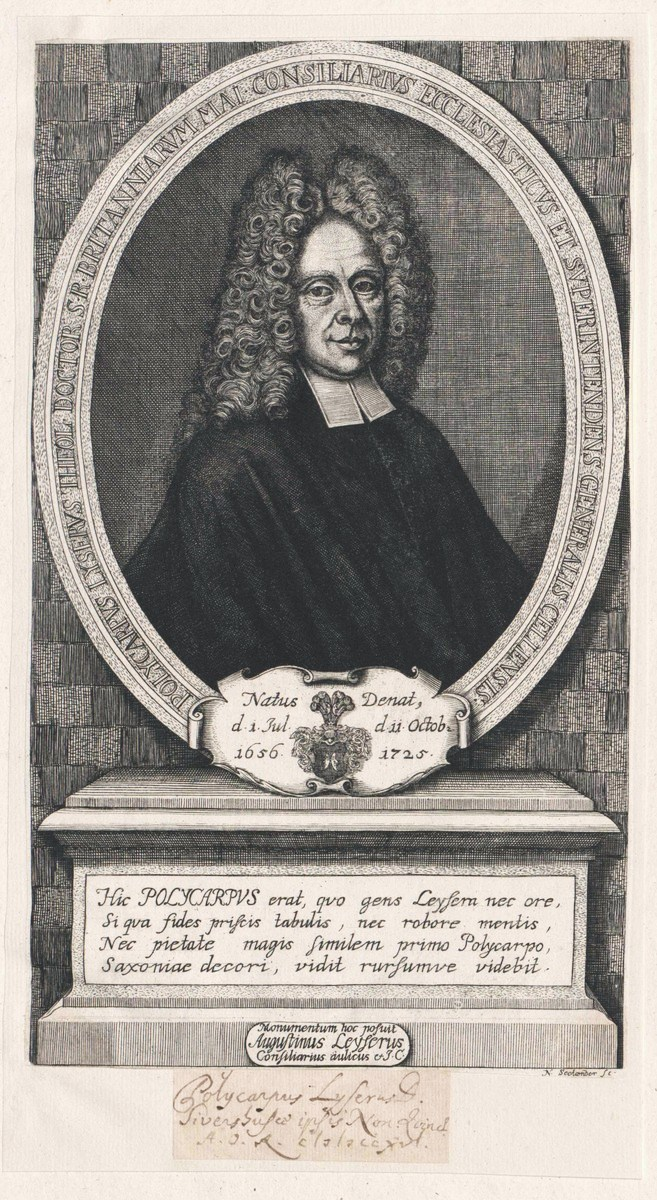
Polykarp Leyser III

Polykarp Leyser III. (1 July 1656 in Halle – 11 October 1725 in Celle) was a German Lutheran theologian, superintendent, chaplain (Oberhofprediger), and orientalist.

== Family ==
His father Friedrich Wilhelm Leyser (1622–1691) was the son of Polykarp Leyser II and grandson of Polykarp Leyser the Elder, both also theologians. His mother was Friedrich's wife Christine Margarethe Malsius (c 1630–before 1720).

He married Margaretha Magdalena Barckhausen (1666–1699), daughter of the theologian Hermann Barckhausen (1629–1695) and his wife Magdalena Gesenius († 1677). They had two children, including the theologian, philosopher and historian Polykarp Leyser IV (1690–1728). He later remarried, having two more children with his second wife.
