= Polykarp Leyser IV =

German Lutheran theologian, philosopher, physician, lawyer and historian

Polykarp Leyser IV (4 September 1690 in Wunstorf – 7 April 1728 in Helmstedt) was a German Lutheran theologian, philosopher, physician, lawyer, writer and historian. He was the son of Polykarp Leyser III, the great-grandson of Polykarp Leyser II and the great-great grandson of Polykarp Leyser the Elder, all also theologians.

In 1709 he enrolled at the Hessen-Schaumburg state university of Rinteln to study theology; he graduated in 1716 and joined the philosophical faculty as an adjunct professor.

In 1719 he published Conspectus scriptorium editorum et edendorum a Polycarpo Lysero.

In 1722, he gained doctorates in medicine and law; he published his most famous treatise De flore academiarum promovendo the following year.

Between 1722 and 1727 he published 30 books on law and history; he also gained a doctorate in philosophy.

In 1722 he married the daughter of Johann Andreas Schmidt; the couple had a daughter named Philippina Sibylla.
