= Jakob Andreae =

German Lutheran theologian and Protestant Reformer

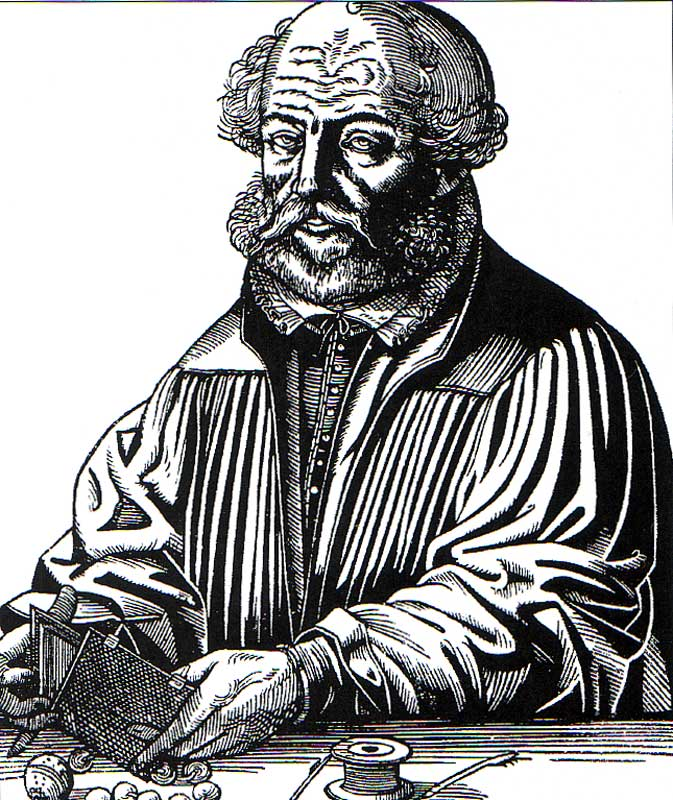
Jakob Andreae

Jakob Andreae (25 March 1528 – 7 January 1590) was a significant German Lutheran theologian and Protestant Reformer involved in the drafting of major documents.

== Life ==
He was born in Waiblingen, in the Duchy of Württemberg; his father was a blacksmith.

He studied at the University of Tübingen from 1541. He attended the diets of Regensburg (1557) and Augsburg (1559), became professor of theology in the University of Tübingen (1562), and provost of the church of St. George. He was active in Protestant discussions and movements, particularly in the adoption of a common declaration of faith by the two parties.

In 1573 he conducted with the help of Martin Crusius a correspondence with Patriarch Jeremias II of Constantinople, to make contact on behalf of the Lutheran Church with the Eastern Orthodox Church.

In 1576, Elector Augustus officially entrusted him with the reform of the churches, schools and universities of Saxony.

He was a signatory of the 1577 Formula of Concord, and editor with Martin Chemnitz of the 1580 Book of Concord. In the latter part of his life he traveled in Bohemia and Germany, working for the consolidation of the Reformation, conferring with pastors, magistrates, and princes.

He attended the 1586 Mompelgard Colloquim, with himself and Lucas Osiander the Elder representing the Lutheran side with Theodore Beza representing the Reformed side. Another name for this event is the Colloquy of Montbéliard. They discussed the doctrines of the Lord's Supper, the person of Christ, predestination, the use of pictures, and ceremonies.

He was the author of more than 150 works, nearly all polemical and vigorously written, for the most part directed against Calvinism.

He died in Tübingen, in the Duchy of Württemberg.

== Family ==
Andreae married twice - firstly to Anna Entringer in 1546, and after her death, he married Regina Schachner Brenzinger in 1585.

He was the father of Johannes Andreae (1554-1601) and the grandfather of Johann Valentin Andreae.

His sister Margarethe was the mother of Polykarp Leyser the Elder; she later married Lucas Osiander the Elder.

== Biographies ==
- Studium Excitare: Biography of Jakob Andreae by Benjamin A. Foxen.
- Schmoller, (Gütersloh, 1890).
