= Criticism of Protestantism =

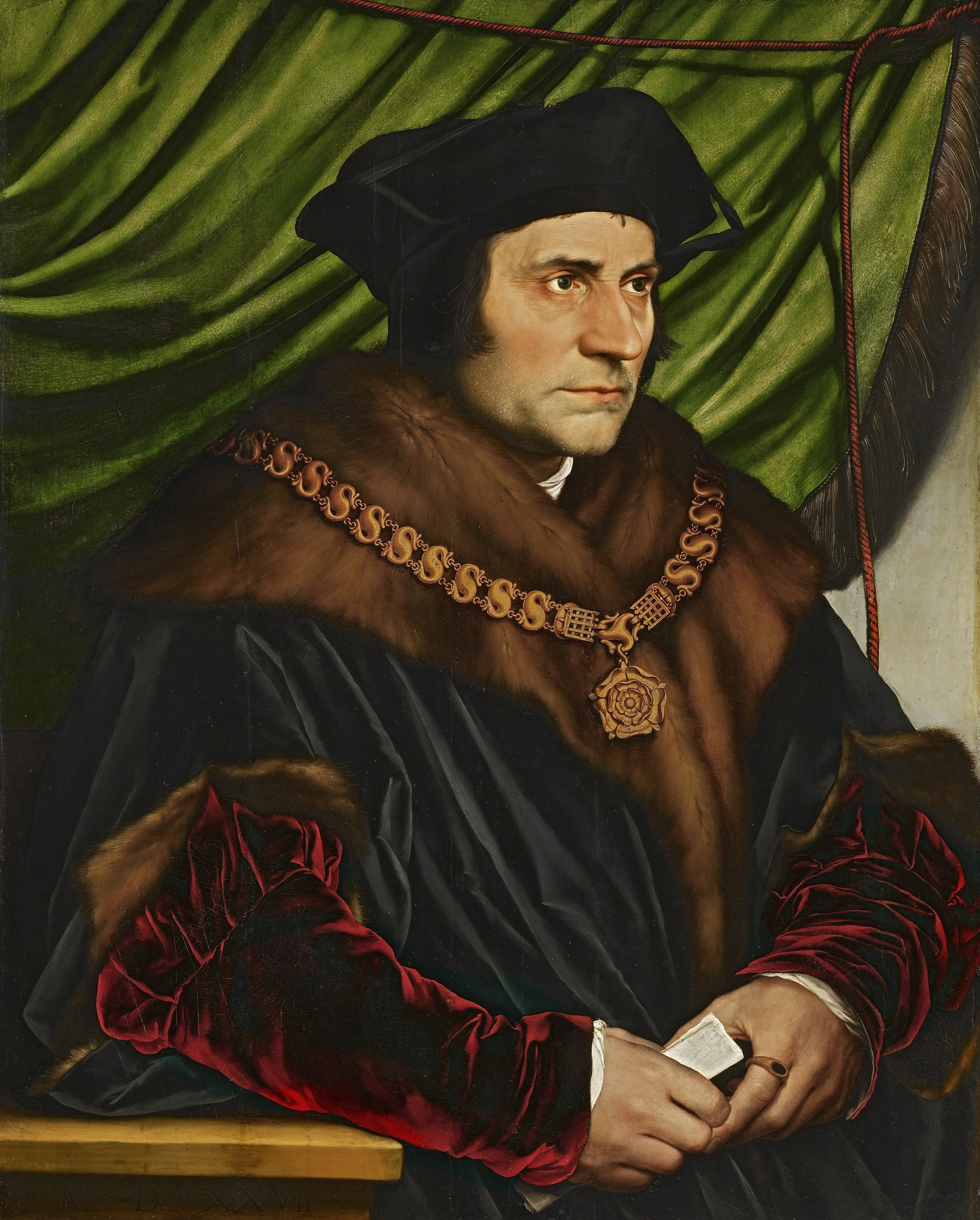
Sir Thomas More, one of the early critics of Protestantism, for which he was executed by Henry VIII of England

Criticism of Protestantism covers critiques and questions raised about Protestantism, the Christian denominations which arose out of the Protestant Reformation. While critics may praise some aspects of Protestantism which are not unique to the various forms of Protestantism, Protestantism is faced with criticism mainly from the Catholic Church and the Eastern Orthodox Church, although Protestant denominations have also engaged in self-critique and criticized one another. According to both the Catholic Church and Eastern Orthodoxy, many major, foundational Protestant doctrines have been officially declared heretical.

The Catholic biblical critique asserts that the Sola scriptura principle of Lutheran and Reformed churches is inaccurate according to the Catholic doctrine. While Catholic tradition agrees with Protestantism that faith, not works, is necessary for "initial" justification, some contemporary Protestant Scholars such as N. T. Wright affirm that both faith and works are necessary for justification. Further complications have arisen from the fundamental difference between the Catholic definition of faith, which is dogmatic, and the Protestant definition, which is called "fiduciary faith".

== Sources of criticism ==
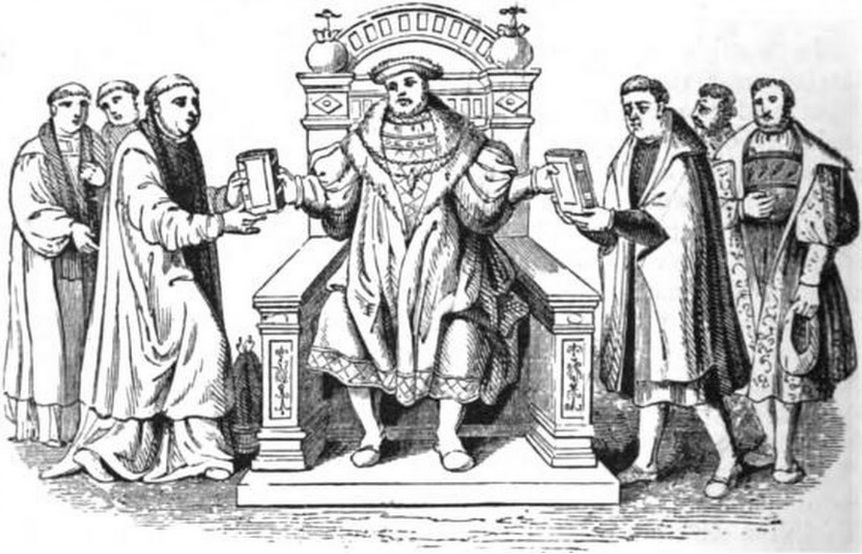
Confutatio Augustana (left) and Confessio Augustana (right) being presented to Charles V

Historically, certain notable Catholic works were written as a criticism of a Protestant work. For example, when the Lutherans gave the 1530 Augsburg Confession, the Catholics responded with the Confutatio Augustana. Also, Diogo de Payva de Andrada wrote the 1578 Defensio Tridentinæ fidei as a response to the Lutheran Martin Chemnitz, who published the Examination of the Council of Trent from 1565 to 1573.

While some Catholic leaders have been seeing the positive side of the German Reformer, Martin Luther, calling him "thoroughly Christocentric" and saying that his intention was "to renew the Church and not to divide it", Catholic doctrine views Protestantism as "suffering from defects", not possessing the fullness of truth and lacking "the fullness of the means of salvation".

Protestants also engage in self-criticism, a special target of which is the fragmentation of Protestant denominations. In addition, due to the fact that Protestantism is not a monolithic tradition, some Protestant denominations criticize the beliefs of other Protestants. For example, the Reformed churches criticize the Methodist churches for the latter denomination's belief in the doctrine of unlimited atonement, in a long-term debate between Calvinists and Arminians.

== Criticism of foundational principles ==
=== Sola scriptura ===
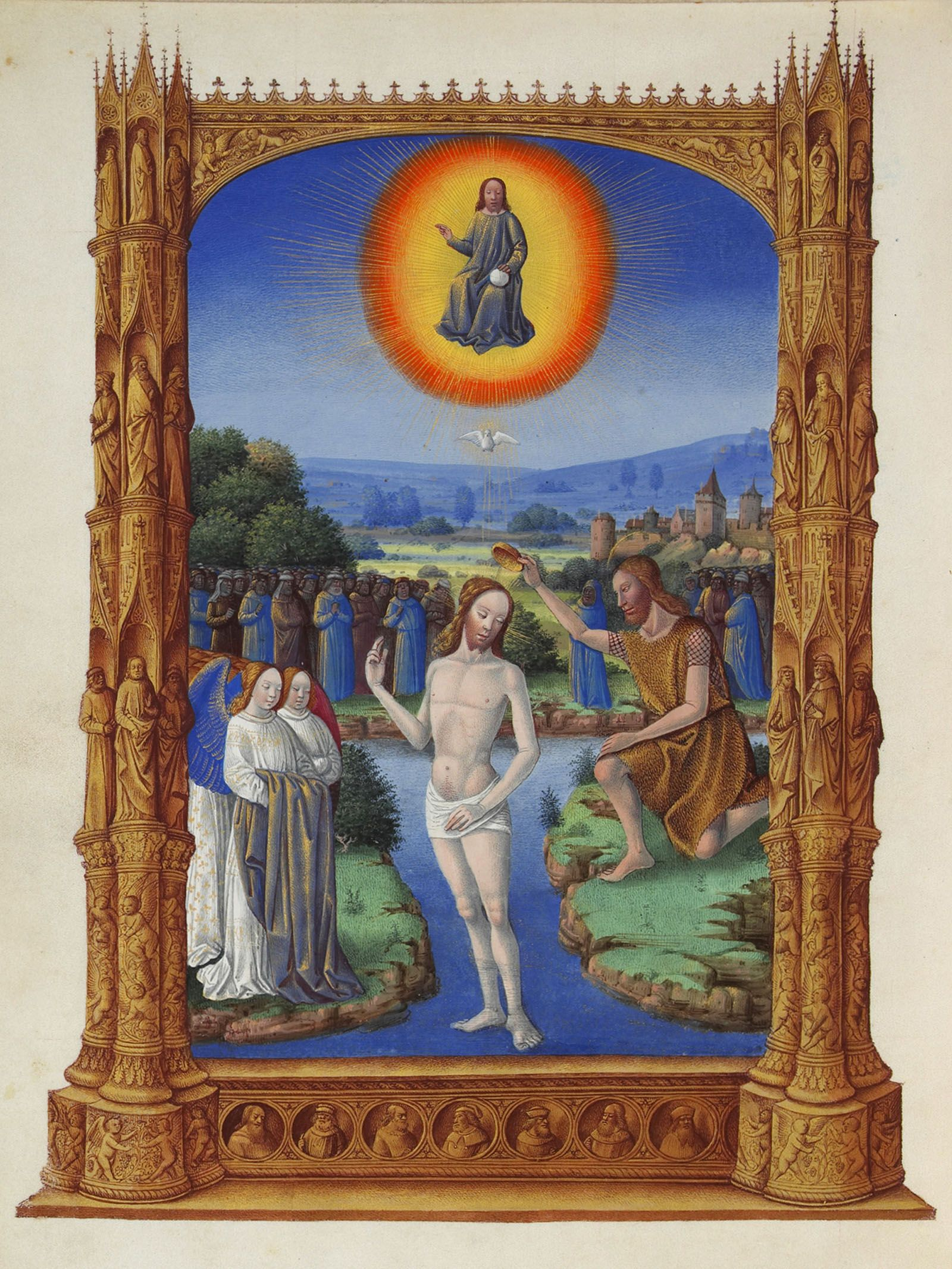
Jean Colombe, Baptism of Christ (1485), Musée Condé

Sola scriptura, one of the Five Principles shared by Lutheran and Reformed churches, originated during the Protestant Reformation, is a formal principle of many Protestant denominations. Baptist churches as well share the Sola scriptura principle and state that the Bible alone is the sole source of knowledge, truth and revelation sent directly from God, the only true Word of God, sufficient of itself to be the supreme authority of the Christian faith.

In contrast, the Anglican Communion and the Methodist church uphold the doctrine of prima scriptura, which holds that Sacred tradition, reason and experience are the sources of Christian doctrine, but are nonetheless subordinate to the authority of the Bible as well.

According to Pope Benedict XVI, the Catholic Church holds a very different view on the Bible and does not consider itself to be a "Religion of the book": "while in the [Catholic] Church we greatly venerate the sacred Scriptures, the Christian faith is not a 'religion of the book': Christianity is the 'religion of the Word of God'... together with the Church's living Tradition, [the Scripture] constitutes the supreme rule of faith."

=== Justification by faith and grace alone ===
==== Sola fide ====
At "the crux of the disputes" are the doctrine on justification and Sola fide, two of the core principles of Protestantism.

The immediate official Catholic response to the Reformation, the Council of Trent, affirmed in 1547 the foundational importance of faith as part of its doctrinal tradition, "we are therefore considered to be justified by faith, because faith is the beginning of human salvation, the foundation, and the root of all Justification... none of those things which precede justification—whether faith or works—merit the grace itself of justification."

Many centuries later, in 1999, the Pontifical Council for Promoting Christian Unity and the Lutheran World Federation have found basic doctrinal agreements in the Joint Declaration on the Doctrine of Justification, showing "a common understanding" of the justification: "By grace alone, in faith in Christ's saving work and not because of any merit on our part, we are accepted by God and receive the Holy Spirit, who renews our hearts while equipping and calling us to good works." The document states that the churches now share "a common understanding of our justification by God's grace through faith in Christ." To the parties involved, this essentially resolves the 500-year-old conflict over the nature of justification which was at the root of the Protestant Reformation. The World Methodist Council formally recognized the Declaration in 2006.

Although an important step forward in the Catholic–Lutheran dialogue, the Declaration continues to show the unsurpassable differences of thought that separate the Catholic Church from the Protestant tradition. Lutherans uphold Luther's doctrine that "human beings are incapable of cooperating in their salvation... God justifies sinners in faith alone (sola fide)." Benedict XVI in 2006 declared that "it is to God and his grace alone that we owe what we are as Christians." However, according to N. T. Wright, "Paul, in company with mainstream Second Temple Judaism, affirms that God's final judgment will be in accordance with the entirety of a life led—in accordance, in other words, with works."

Methodist churches have always emphasized that ordinarily both faith and good works play a role in salvation; in particular, the works of piety and the works of mercy, in Wesleyan-Arminian theology, are "indispensable for our sanctification". Methodist Bishop Scott J. Jones in United Methodist Doctrine says that faith is always necessary to salvation unconditionally. Good works are the exterior result of true faith but are necessary only conditionally, that is, if there is time and opportunity.

==== Criticism of the Joint Declaration within the Catholic Church ====
The Vatican's note in response to the Declaration said that the Protestant formula "at the same time righteous and sinner", is not acceptable: "In baptism everything that is really sin is taken away, and so, in those who are born anew there is nothing that is hateful to God. It follows that the concupiscence [disordered desire] that remains in the baptised is not, properly speaking, sin."

==== Catholic opinion on the Great Apostasy ====
According to Benedict XVI, the encounter of Christianity with enlightened Greek culture and philosophy is not apostasy into Paganism, but rather a natural development in the history of the early Church; He also states that the translation of the Old Testament in Greek, and the fact that the New Testament itself was written in Greek, are a direct consequence of the biblical revelation's reception by the Hellenistic world.

==== Apostolic succession ====
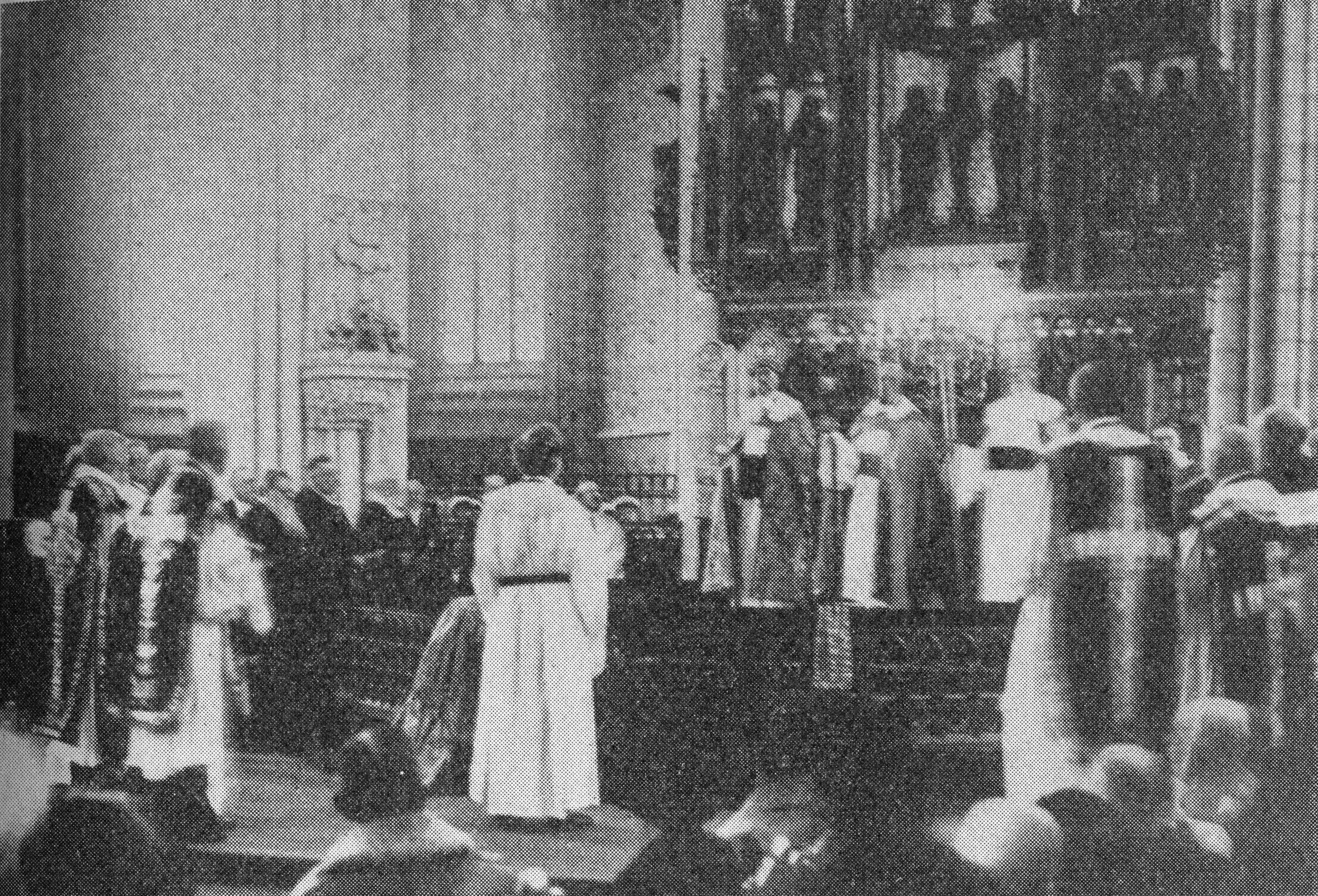
Nathan Söderblom is ordained as archbishop of the Church of Sweden, 1914. Although the Swedish Lutherans can boast of an unbroken line of ordinations going back prior to the Reformation, the bishops of Rome today do not recognize such ordinations as valid as they occurred without authorization from the Roman See.

Some Catholic critics state that Protestant acceptance of the Great Apostasy implies their non-acceptance of the apostolic succession in the Catholic Church and Orthodox Churches. At the same time, a number of Protestant churches, including Lutheran churches, the Moravian Church, and the Anglican Communion, affirm that they ordain their clergy in line with the apostolic succession; in 1922, the Eastern Orthodox Ecumenical Patriarch of Constantinople recognised Anglican orders as valid.

The Catholic Church has rejected the validity of Anglican apostolic succession as well as that of other Protestant churches, saying in regard to the latter that "the proclamation of Sola scriptura led inevitably to an obscuring of the older idea of the Church and its priesthood. Thus through the centuries, the imposition of hands either by men already ordained or by others was often in practice abandoned. Where it did take place, it did not have the same meaning as in the Church of Tradition."

== Criticism of doctrine and practices ==
=== Eucharist ===
Some Catholic critics say that Protestant Churches, including the Anglican, Lutheran, Methodist, and Reformed traditions, each teach a different form of the doctrine of the real presence of Christ in the Eucharist, with Lutherans affirming Christ's presence as a sacramental union, and Reformed/Presbyterian Christians affirming a pneumatic presence. Baptists, Anabaptists, the Plymouth Brethren, Jehovah's Witnesses, and other Restorationist Protestant denominations affirm that the Lord's Supper is a memorial of Jesus' death, and consider the belief in the real presence of Christ to be crypto-papist, unbiblical or a misinterpretation of the Scriptures.

=== Confession and other sacraments ===
While some Protestants, such as Lutherans, have retained the sacrament of confession, most Protestant denominations do not.

=== Prayers for the dead ===
The Anglican and Methodist traditions along with Eastern Orthodoxy, affirm the existence of an intermediate state, Hades, and thus pray for the dead, as do many Lutheran churches, such as the Evangelical Lutheran Church in America, which "remembers the faithful departed in the Prayers of the People every Sunday, including those who have recently died and those commemorated on the church calendar of saints".

== Historical and ecclesiological critique ==
Major Protestant orientations and their relationships to each other. However, the actual history of influences is more complicated due to the influence of Nicodemites. For example, in areas where open Calvinism was outlawed, Crypto-Calvinists within Lutheran churches continued to exert an influence. Additionally, later cross denominational movements such as Pietism, Rationalism, and the Charismatic Movement complicate the history of Protestant traditions. Additionally, Crypto-Protestantism is not shown at all on this chart.

Protestant churches are considered by some Catholic critics as a negative force which "protests" and revolts against the Catholic Church. Catholic theologian Karl Adam wrote: "The sixteenth century revolt from the Church led inevitably to the revolt from Christ of the eighteenth century, and thence to the revolt from God of the nineteenth. And thus the modern spirit has been torn loose from the deepest and strongest supports of its life, from its foundation in the Absolute, in the self-existent Being, in the Value of all values... Instead of the man who is rooted in the Absolute, hidden in God, strong and rich, we have the man who rests upon himself, the autonomous man."

In response to Adam's accusation towards Protestantism, the church historian and Protestant theologian Wilhelm Pauck pointed out that "In summing up ... the Roman Catholic criticism that the Reformation and Protestantism resulted from a revolt against the Church, we conclude that the Roman Catholic leaders of the sixteenth century are not without responsibility for the break-up of Christian unity", therefore the Schism between Protestants and Catholics was an inevitable consequence of the Protestant Reformation for which both sides have to be considered responsible.

== Sexual abuse cases ==
A report issued by Christian Ministry Resources (CMR) in 2002, stated that contrary to popular opinion, there are more allegations of pedophilia in Protestant congregations than Catholic ones, and that sexual violence is most often committed by volunteers rather than by priests. It also criticized the way the media reported sexual crimes in Australia. The Royal Commission into Institutional Responses to Child Sexual Abuse revealed that between January 1950 and February 2015, 4,445 people alleged incidents of child sexual abuse in 4,765 claims. The media reportedly reported that as many as 7% of priests were accused of being a pedophile, but ignored the same report on the Protestant churches and Jehovah's Witnesses; Gerard Henderson stated:

That’s 2,504 incidents or allegations in the period between 1977, when the Uniting Church was formed, and 2017. This compares with 4,445 claims with respect to the Catholic Church between 1950 and 2015. And the Catholic Church is five times larger than the Uniting Church. Moreover, the Royal Commission did not include allegations in the period 1950 to 1977 with respect to the Presbyterian, Congregational and Methodist communities which folded into the Uniting Church in 1977. This would take the number of allegations beyond 2,504, especially since it seems that child sexual abuse was at its worst in the 1960s and 1970s. ... Allegations against the Jehovah Witness religion, on a per capita basis, are dramatically higher than for either the Catholic or the Uniting churches.

— Gerard Henderson

== See also ==
- Anti-Christian sentiment
  - Anti-Catholicism
  - Anti-Eastern Orthodox sentiment
  - Anti-Mormonism
  - Anti-Oriental Orthodox sentiment
  - Anti-Protestantism
- Black Legend (Spain)
- Counter-Reformation
- Criticism of the Catholic Church
  - Catholic Church sexual abuse cases
  - Catholic Inquisition
  - Controversies about Opus Dei
  - European wars of religion
  - Pope as the Antichrist
