= Council of Trent =

Roman Catholic Church ecumenical council 1545–1563

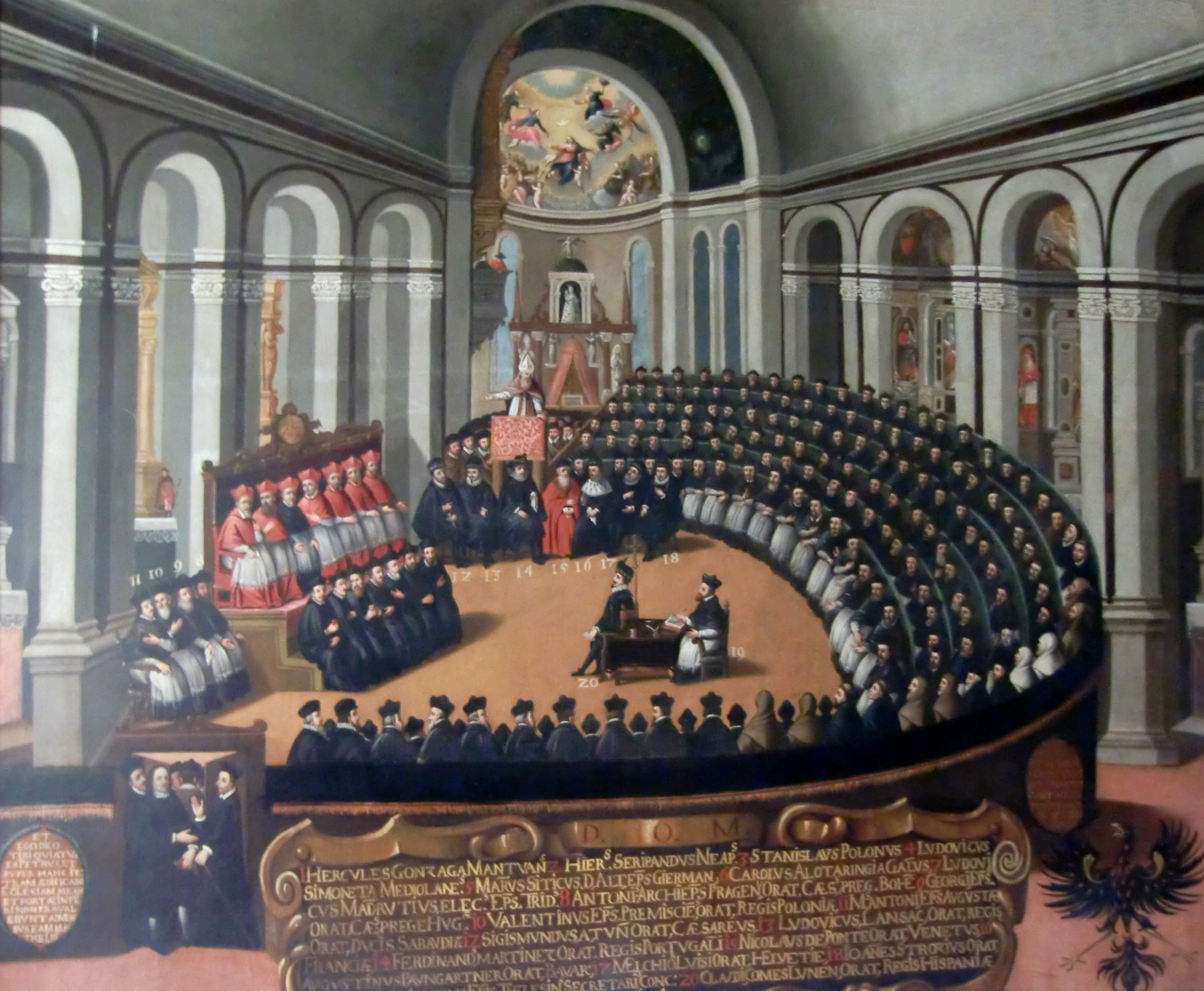
- Council of Trent, painting in the Museo del Palazzo del Buonconsiglio, Trento
- Date: 13 December 1545 – 4 December 1563
- Accepted by: Catholic Church; Old Catholic Church; Traditional Catholic Churches
- Previous council: Fifth Council of the Lateran
- Next council: First Vatican Council
- Convoked by: Pope Paul III
- President: Pope Paul III; Pope Julius III; Pope Pius IV
- Attendance: About 255 during the final sessions
- Topics: Protestantism, Counter-Reformation
- Documents and statements: Seventeen dogmatic decrees covering then-disputed aspects of Catholic religion

The Council of Trent (Latin: Concilium Tridentinum), held between 1545 and 1563 in Trent (or Trento), in Northern Italy, was the 19th ecumenical council of the Catholic Church. Prompted by the Protestant Reformation at the time, it has been described as the "most characteristic embodiment of the ideals of the Counter-Reformation". It was the last time a Catholic ecumenical council was organized outside the city of Rome, and the second time a council was convened in the territory of the Holy Roman Empire (the first being the Council of Constance).

The council issued key statements and clarifications of the Catholic Church's doctrine and teachings, including scripture, the biblical canon, sacred tradition, original sin, justification, salvation, the sacraments, the Mass, and the veneration of saints and also issued condemnations of what it defined to be heresies committed by proponents of Protestantism. The consequences of the council were also significant with regard to the Catholic Church's liturgy and censorship.

The council met for twenty-five sessions between 13 December 1545 and 4 December 1563. Pope Paul III, who convoked the council, oversaw the first eight sessions (1545–1547), while the twelfth to sixteenth sessions (1551–52) were overseen by Pope Julius III and the seventeenth to twenty-fifth sessions (1562–63) by Pope Pius IV. More than three hundred years passed until the next ecumenical council, the First Vatican Council, was convened in 1869.

== Background information ==
=== Obstacles and events before the council's problem area ===
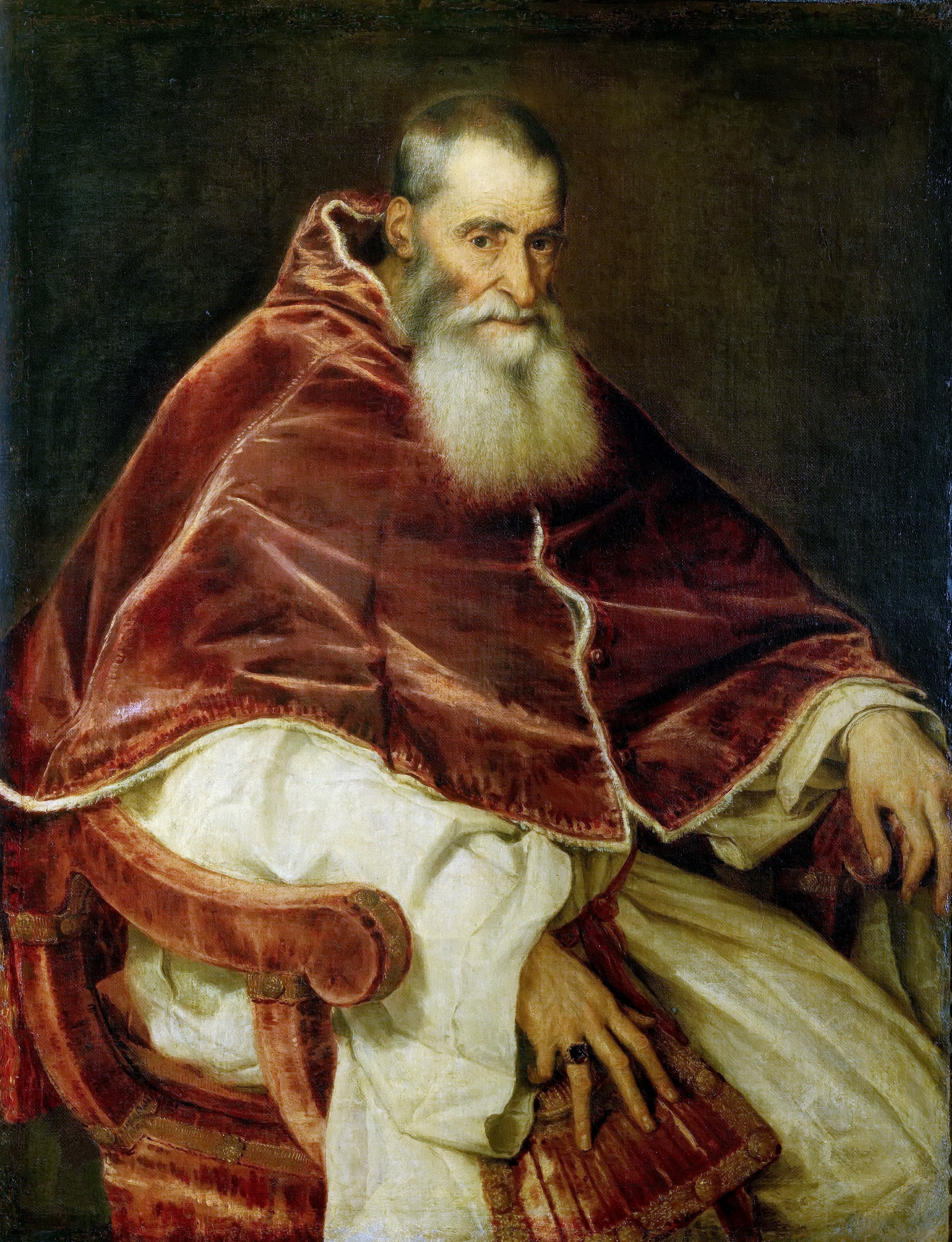
Pope Paul III, convener of the Council of Trent, portrait by Titian (1543)

On 15 March 1517, the Fifth Council of the Lateran closed its activities with a number of reform proposals (on the selection of bishops, taxation, censorship and preaching) but not on the new major problems that confronted the church in Germany and other parts of Europe. A few months later, on 31 October 1517, Martin Luther issued his 95 Theses in Wittenberg.

=== A general, free council in Germany ===
Luther's position on ecumenical councils shifted over time, but in 1520 he appealed to the German princes to oppose the papal Church at the time, if necessary with a council in Germany, open and free of the Papacy. After the Pope condemned in Exsurge Domine fifty-two of Luther's theses as heresy, German opinion considered a council the best method to reconcile existing differences. German Catholics, diminished in number, hoped for a council to clarify matters.

It took a generation for the council to materialise, partly due to papal fears over potentially renewing a schism over conciliarism; partly because Lutherans demanded the exclusion of the papacy from the council; partly because of ongoing political rivalries between France and the Holy Roman Empire; and partly due to the Turkish dangers in the Mediterranean. Under Pope Clement VII (1523–34), mutinous troops, many of whom were Lutheran belonging to the Catholic Holy Roman Emperor Charles V, sacked Papal Rome in 1527, "raping, killing, burning, stealing, the like had not been seen since the Vandals". Saint Peter's Basilica and the Sistine Chapel were used for stabling horses. Pope Clement, fearful of the potential for more violence, delayed calling the council.

Charles V strongly favored a council but needed the support of King Francis I of France, who attacked him militarily. Francis I generally opposed a general council due to partial support of the Protestant cause within France. Charles' younger brother Ferdinand of Austria, who ruled a huge swath of territory in central Europe, agreed in 1532 to the Nuremberg Religious Peace granting religious liberty to the Protestants, and in 1533 he further complicated matters when suggesting a general council to include both Catholic and Protestant rulers of Europe that would devise a compromise between the two theological systems. This proposal met the opposition of the Pope, for it gave recognition to Protestants and also elevated the secular Princes of Europe above the clergy on church matters. Faced with a Turkish attack, Charles held the support of the Protestant German rulers, all of whom delayed the opening of the Council of Trent.

== Occasion, sessions, and attendance ==
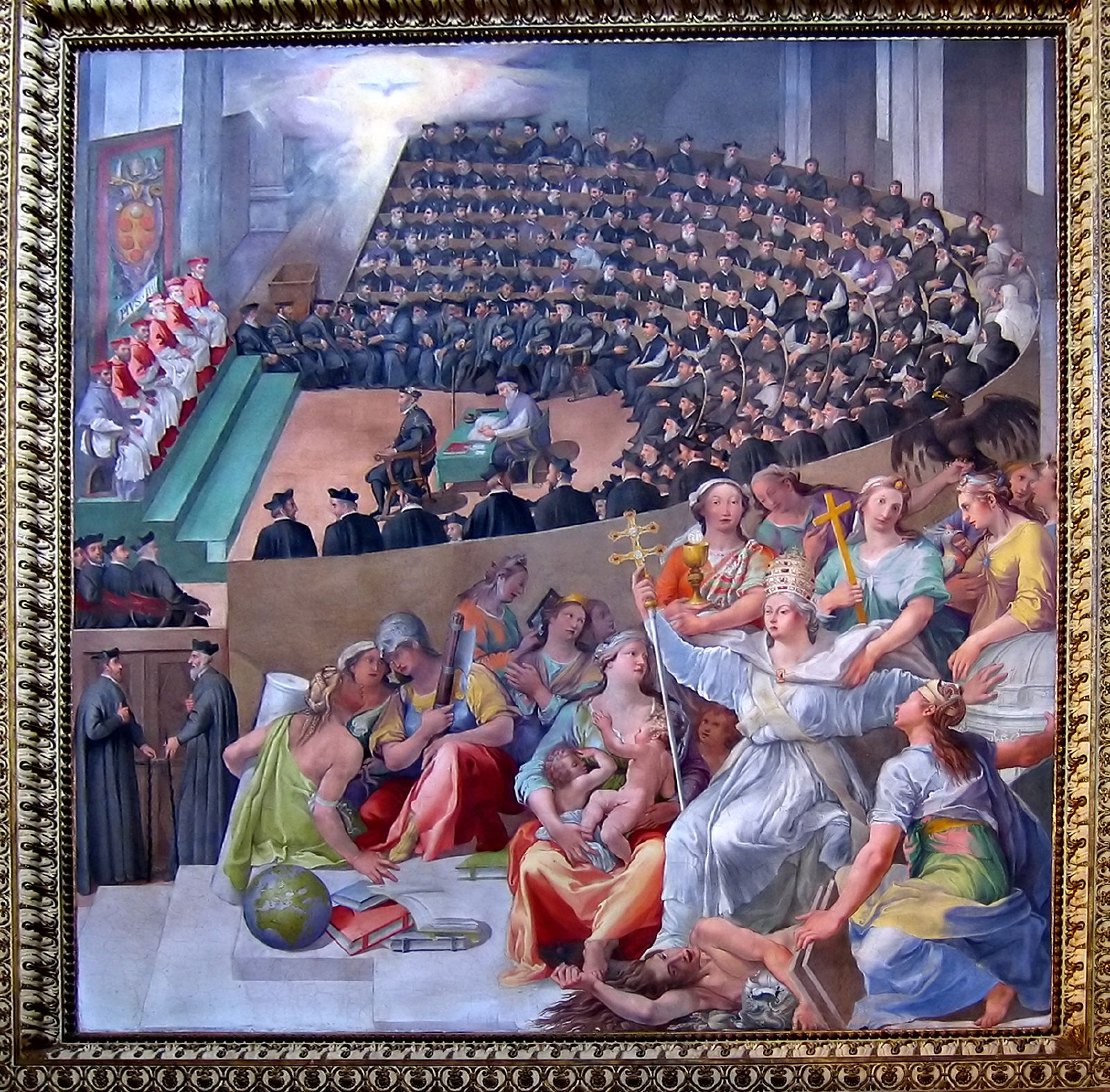
The Council of Trent, depicted by Pasquale Cati in 1588

In the to-and-fro of medieval politics, Pope Pius II, in his bull Execrabilis (1460) and his reply to the University of Cologne (1463), had set aside the theory of the supremacy of general councils laid down by the Council of Constance, which had also called for frequent ecumenical councils every ten years to cope with the backlog of reform and heresies.

Martin Luther had appealed for a general council, in response to the Papal bull Exsurge Domine of Pope Leo X (1520). In 1522 German diets joined in the appeal, with Charles V seconding and pressing for a council as a means of reunifying the Catholic Church and settling the Reformation controversies. Pope Clement VII (1523–34) was vehemently against the idea of a council, agreeing with Francis I of France.

=== Sessions ===
The history of the council is divided into three distinct periods: 1545–1549, 1551–1552 and 1562–1563.

The number of attending members in the three periods varied considerably. The council was small to begin with, opening with only about 30 bishops. It increased toward the close, but never reached the number of the First Council of Nicaea (which had 318 members, in 325) nor of the First Vatican Council (which numbered 744, in 1868). The decrees were signed in 1563 by 255 members, the highest attendance of the whole council, including four papal legates, two cardinals, three patriarchs, twenty-five archbishops, and 168 bishops, two-thirds of whom were Italians. The Italian and Spanish prelates were vastly preponderant in power and numbers. At the passage of the most important decrees, not more than sixty prelates were present. Although most Protestants did not attend, ambassadors and theologians of Brandenburg, Württemberg, and Strasbourg attended having been granted an improved safe conduct.

==== Pre-council ====
Pope Paul III (1534–1549), seeing that the Protestant Reformation was no longer confined to a few preachers, but had won over various princes, especially in Germany, to its ideas, desired a council. Yet when he proposed the idea to his cardinals, it was almost unanimously opposed. Nonetheless, he sent nuncios throughout Europe to propose the idea. Paul III issued a decree for a general council to be held in Mantua, Italy, to begin on 23 May 1537. Martin Luther wrote the Smalcald Articles in preparation for the general council. The Smalcald Articles were designed to sharply define where the Lutherans could and would not compromise. The council was ordered by the Emperor and Pope Paul III to convene in Mantua on 23 May 1537.

It failed to convene after another war broke out between France and Charles V, resulting in a non-attendance of French prelates. Protestants refused to attend as well. Financial difficulties in Mantua led the Pope in the autumn of 1537 to move the council to Vicenza, where participation was poor. The council was postponed indefinitely on 21 May 1539.

Pope Paul III then initiated several internal Church reforms while Emperor Charles V convened with Protestants and Cardinal Gasparo Contarini at the Diet of Regensburg, to reconcile differences. Mediating and conciliatory formulations were developed on certain topics. In particular, a two-part doctrine of justification was formulated that would later be rejected at Trent. Unity failed between Catholic and Protestant representatives "because of different concepts of Church and Justification".

==== First period ====
However, the council was delayed until 1545 and, as it happened, convened right before Luther's death. Unable, however, to resist the urging of Charles V, the pope, after proposing Mantua as the place of meeting, convened the council at Trent (at that time ruled by a prince-bishop under the Holy Roman Empire), on 13 December 1545; the Pope's decision to transfer it to Bologna in March 1547 on the pretext of avoiding a plague failed to take effect and the council was indefinitely prorogued on 17 September 1549. None of the three popes reigning over the duration of the council ever attended, which had been a condition of Charles V. Papal legates were appointed to represent the Papacy.

==== Second period ====
Reopened at Trent on 1 May 1551 by the convocation of Pope Julius III (1550–1555), it was broken up by the sudden victory of Maurice, Elector of Saxony over Emperor Charles V and his march into surrounding state of Tirol on 28 April 1552. There was no hope of reassembling the council while the very anti-Protestant Paul IV was Pope.

During the second period, the Protestants present asked for a renewed discussion on points already defined and for bishops to be released from their oaths of allegiance to the Pope. When the last period began, all intentions of conciliating the Protestants was gone and the Jesuits had become a strong force. This last period was begun especially as an attempt to prevent the formation of a general council including Protestants, as had been demanded by some in France.

==== Third period ====
The council was reconvened by Pope Pius IV (1559–1565) for the last time, meeting from 18 January 1562 at Santa Maria Maggiore, and continued until its final adjournment on 4 December 1563. It closed with a series of ritual acclamations honouring the reigning Pope, the Popes who had convoked the council, the emperor and the kings who had supported it, the papal legates, the cardinals, the ambassadors present, and the bishops, followed by acclamations of acceptance of the faith of the council and its decrees, and of anathema for all heretics.

The French monarchy boycotted the entire council until the last minute when a delegation led by Charles de Guise, Cardinal of Lorraine finally arrived in November 1562. The first outbreak of the French Wars of Religion had occurred earlier in the year and the French Church, facing a significant and powerful Protestant minority in France, experienced iconoclasm violence regarding the use of sacred images. Such concerns were not primary in the Italian and Spanish Churches. The last-minute inclusion of a decree on sacred images was a French initiative, and the text, never discussed on the floor of the council or referred to council theologians, was based on a French draft.

== Objectives and overall results ==
The main objectives of the council were twofold:

1. To condemn the principles and doctrines of Protestantism and to clarify the doctrines of the Catholic Church on all disputed points. This had not been done formally since the 1530 Confutatio Augustana. It is true that the emperor intended it to be a strictly general or truly ecumenical council, at which the Protestants should have a fair hearing. He secured, during the council's second period, 1551–1553, an invitation, twice given, to the Protestants to be present and the council issued a letter of safe conduct (thirteenth session) and offered them the right of discussion, but denied them a vote. Melanchthon and Johannes Brenz, with some other German Lutherans, actually started in 1552 on the journey to Trent. Brenz offered a confession and Melanchthon, who got no farther than Nuremberg, took with him the Confessio Saxonica. But the refusal to give the Protestants the vote and the consternation produced by the success of Maurice in his campaign against Charles V in 1552 effectually put an end to Protestant cooperation.
2. To effect a reformation in discipline or administration. This object had been one of the causes calling forth the reformatory councils and had been lightly touched upon by the Fifth Council of the Lateran under Pope Julius II. The obvious corruption in the administration of the Catholic Church was one of the numerous causes of the Reformation. Twenty-five public sessions were held, but nearly half of them were spent in solemn formalities. The chief work was done in committees or congregations. The entire management was in the hands of the papal legate. The liberal elements lost out in the debates and voting. The council abolished some of the most notorious abuses and introduced or recommended disciplinary reforms affecting the sale of indulgences, the morals of convents, the education of the clergy, the non-residence of bishops (also bishops having plurality of benefices, which was fairly common), and the careless fulmination of censures, and forbade duelling. Although evangelical sentiments were uttered by some of the members in favour of the supreme authority of the Scriptures and justification by faith, no concession whatsoever was made to Protestantism, according to a Protestant source.

Specific issues that were discussed included:

- The Church as the ultimate interpreter of Scripture. Also, the Bible and church tradition (the tradition that composed part of the Catholic faith) were equally and independently authoritative.
- The relationship of faith and works in salvation was defined, following controversy over Martin Luther's doctrine of "justification by faith alone".
- Other Catholic practices that had drawn the ire of reformers within the Catholic Church, such as indulgences, pilgrimages, the veneration of saints and relics, and the veneration of the Virgin Mary were strongly reaffirmed, though abuses of them were forbidden.
- Decrees concerning sacred music and religious art, though inexplicit, were subsequently amplified by theologians and writers to condemn many types of Renaissance and medieval styles and iconographies, impacting heavily on the development of these art forms.

The doctrinal decisions of the council were set forth in decrees (decreta), which are divided into chapters (capita), which contain the positive statement of the conciliar dogmas, and into short canons (canones), which condemn incorrect views (often a Protestant-associated notion stated in an extreme form) with the concluding anathema sit ("let him be anathema" i.e., excluded from the society of the faithful).

The consequences of the council were also significant with regard to the Catholic Church's liturgy and practices. In 1565, a year after the council finished its work, Pius IV issued the Tridentine Creed (after Tridentum, Trent's Latin name) and his successor Pius V then issued the Roman Catechism and revisions of the Breviary and Missal in, respectively, 1566, 1568 and 1570. These, in turn, led to the codification of the Tridentine Mass, which became the Latin Church's primary form of the Mass for the next four hundred years.

The council endorsed the Latin Vulgate the official biblical text of the Roman Church for public use (without prejudice to the original texts in Hebrew and Greek, nor to other traditional translations of the Catholic Church, but favoring the traditional Latin over vernacular or unauthorized translations, such as the controversial English-language Tyndale Bible). Towards that goal, they commissioned the creation of a revised and standardized Vulgate in light of textual criticism, although this was not achieved until the 1590s, and has been revised over time. The council also officially re-affirmed the traditional Catholic Canon of biblical books, which was identical to the canon of Scripture issued by the Council of Rome under Pope Damasus in 382. This was in response to the increasing Protestant exclusion of the deuterocanonical books. (The previous dogmatic affirmation of the Canonical books was at the Council of Florence in the 1441 bull Cantate Domino, as affirmed by Pope Leo XIII in his 1893 encyclical Providentissimus Deus (#20).)

== Decrees ==
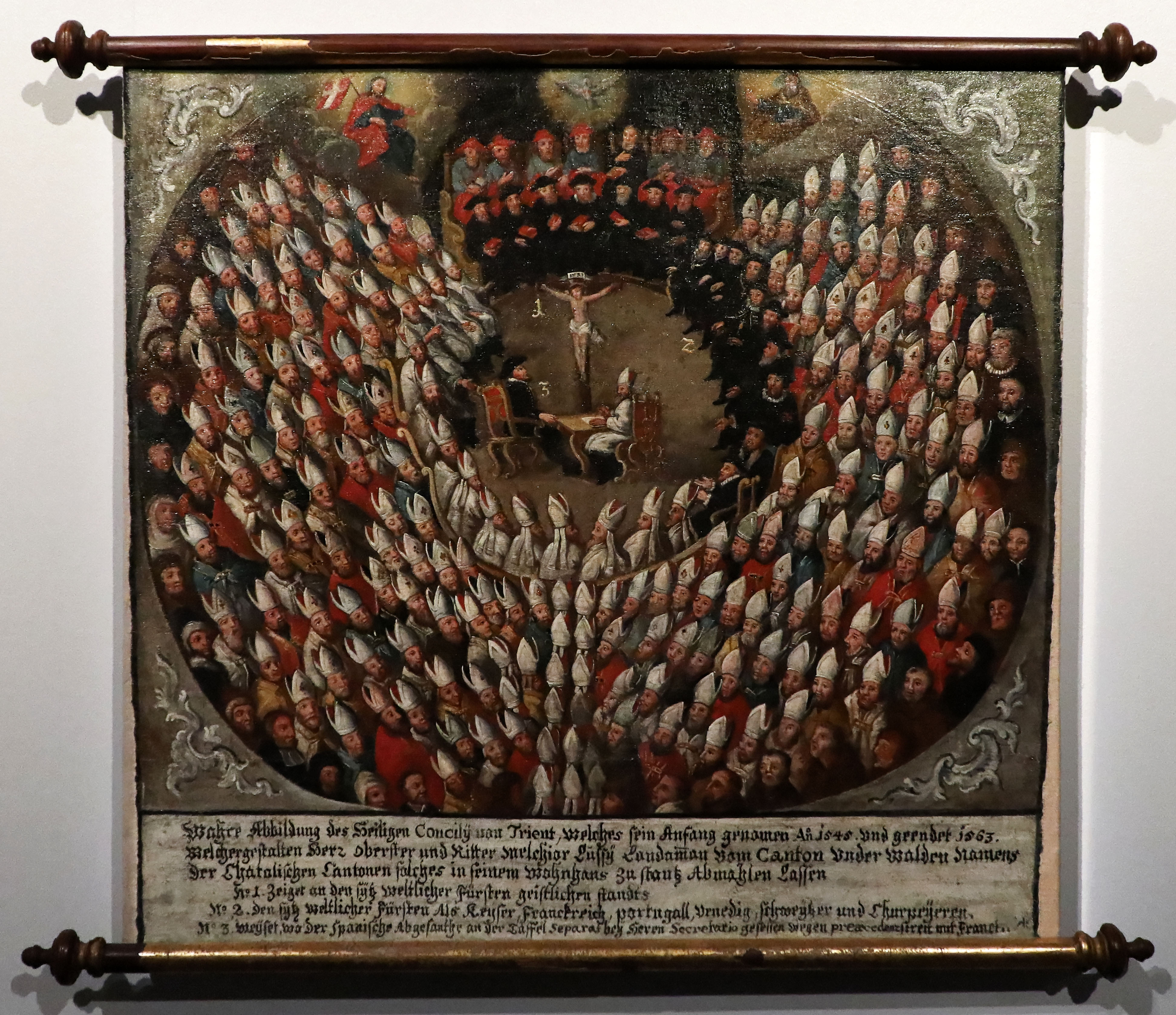

The doctrinal acts are as follows:

After reaffirming the Niceno-Constantinopolitan Creed (third session), the decree was passed (fourth session) confirming that the deuterocanonical books were on a par with the other books of the canon (against Luther's placement of these books in the Apocrypha of his edition) and coordinating church tradition with the Scriptures as a rule of faith. The Vulgate translation was affirmed to be authoritative for the text of Scripture.

Justification (sixth session) was declared to be offered upon the basis of human cooperation with divine grace (synergism) as opposed to the typical Protestant doctrine of passive reception of grace (monergism). Understanding the Protestant "faith alone" doctrine to be one of simple human confidence in Divine Mercy, the council rejected the "vain confidence" of the Protestants, stating that no one can know infallibly who has received the grace of final perseverance apart from receiving a special revelation. Furthermore, the council affirmed—against some Protestants—that the grace of God can be forfeited through mortal sin.

The greatest weight in the council's decrees is given to the sacraments. The seven sacraments were reaffirmed and the Eucharist pronounced to be a true propitiatory sacrifice as well as a sacrament, in which the bread and wine were consecrated into the Eucharist (thirteenth and twenty-second sessions). The term transubstantiation was used by the council, but the specific Aristotelian explanation given by Scholasticism was not cited as dogmatic. Instead, the decree states that Christ is "really, truly, substantially present" in the consecrated forms. The sacrifice of the Mass was to be offered for dead and living alike and in giving to the apostles the command "do this in remembrance of me," Christ conferred upon them a sacerdotal power. The practice of withholding the cup from the laity was confirmed (twenty-first session) as one which the Church Fathers had commanded for good and sufficient reasons; yet in certain cases the Pope was made the supreme arbiter as to whether the rule should be strictly maintained.

Ordination (twenty-third session) was defined to imprint an indelible character on the soul. The priesthood of the New Testament takes the place of the Levitical priesthood. To the performance of its functions, the consent of the people is not necessary.

In the decrees on marriage (twenty-fourth session) the excellence of the celibate state was reaffirmed, concubinage condemned and the validity of marriage made dependent upon the wedding taking place before a priest and two witnesses, although the lack of a requirement for parental consent ended a debate that had proceeded from the 12th century. In the case of a divorce, the right of the innocent party to marry again was denied so long as the other party was alive, even if the other party had committed adultery. However the council "refused … to assert the necessity or usefulness of clerical celibacy".

In the twenty-fifth and last session, the doctrines of purgatory, the invocation of saints and the veneration of relics were reaffirmed, as was also the efficacy of indulgences as dispensed by the Catholic Church according to the power given her, but with some cautionary recommendations, and a ban on the sale of indulgences. Short and rather inexplicit passages concerning religious images, were to have great impact on the development of Catholic Church art. Much more than the Second Council of Nicaea (787), the council fathers of Trent stressed the pedagogical purpose of Christian images.

Baroque Art is in part a consequence of the Council of Trent more specifically its twenty-fifth session where it emphasized that sacred art should educate the faithful, inspire devotion, and accurately represent biblical narratives. All this led to a renewed focus on emotional engagement and clarity in religious paintings. Due to these new directives, the Catholic Church began to promote baroque art characterized by dramatic compositions, chiaroscuro, and theatrical gestures. The churches adoption of the art style would help to increase its spread of influence.

=== Practical ===
On the language of the Mass, "contrary to what is often said", the council condemned the insistence that only vernacular languages must be used, while affirming on the use of Latin for the Roman rite. However, elements of the Prône, the vernacular catechetical preaching service common in the medieval High Mass (and some extra-liturgical situations) became mandatory for Sundays and feast days (fifth session, chapter 2).

The council appointed, in 1562 (eighteenth session), a commission to prepare a list of forbidden books (Index Librorum Prohibitorum), but it later left the matter to the Pope. The preparation of a catechism and the revision of the Breviary and Missal were also left to the pope. The catechism embodied the council's far-reaching results, including reforms and definitions of the sacraments, the Scriptures, church dogma, and duties of the clergy.

=== Ratification and promulgation ===
On adjourning, the council asked the supreme pontiff to ratify all its decrees and definitions. This petition was complied with by Pope Pius IV, on 26 January 1564, in the papal bull, Benedictus Deus, which enjoins strict obedience upon all Catholics and forbids, under pain of ex-communication, all unauthorised interpretation, reserving this to the Pope alone and threatens the disobedient with "the indignation of Almighty God and of his blessed apostles, Peter and Paul." Pope Pius appointed a commission of cardinals to assist him in interpreting and enforcing the decrees.

The Index Librorum Prohibitorum was announced in 1564 and the following books were issued with the papal imprimatur: the Profession of the Tridentine Faith and the Tridentine Catechism (1566), the Breviary (1568), the Missal (1570) and the Vulgate (1590 and then 1592).

The decrees of the council were acknowledged in Italy, Portugal, Poland and by the Catholic princes of Germany at the Diet of Augsburg in 1566. Philip II of Spain accepted them for Spain, the Netherlands and Sicily inasmuch as they did not infringe the royal prerogative. In France, they were officially recognised by the king only in their doctrinal parts. Although the disciplinary or moral reformatory decrees were never published by the throne, they received official recognition at provincial synods and were enforced by the bishops. Holy Roman Emperors Ferdinand I and Maximilian II never recognized the existence of any of the decrees. No attempt was made to introduce it into England. Pius IV sent the decrees to Mary, Queen of Scots, with a letter dated 13 June 1564, requesting that she publish them in Scotland, but she dared not do it in the face of John Knox and the Reformation.

=== Later developments ===
The decrees of the Council of Trent were later supplemented by the First Vatican Council of 1870, and the Council fathers of the Second Vatican Council (1963-1965) also saw themselves as continuing the work commenced at Trent, for example in their Decree on Priestly Training, issued towards the end of the Council.

== Publication of documents ==
A comprehensive history is found in Hubert Jedin's The History of the Council of Trent (Geschichte des Konzils von Trient) with about 2,500 pages in four volumes: The History of the Council of Trent: The fight for a Council (Vol I, 1951); The History of the Council of Trent: The first Sessions in Trent (1545–1547) (Vol II, 1957); The History of the Council of Trent: Sessions in Bologna 1547–1548 and Trento 1551–1552 (Vol III, 1970, 1998); The History of the Council of Trent: Third Period and Conclusion (Vol IV, 1976).

The canons and decrees of the council have been published very often and in many languages. The first issue was by Paulus Manutius (Rome, 1564). Commonly used Latin editions are by Judocus Le Plat (Antwerp, 1779) and by Johann Friedrich von Schulte and Aemilius Ludwig Richter (Leipzig, 1853). Other editions are in vol. vii. of the Acta et decreta conciliorum recentiorum. Collectio Lacensis (7 vols., Freiburg, 1870–90), reissued as independent volume (1892); Concilium Tridentinum: Diariorum, actorum, epistularum, … collectio, ed. Sebastianus Merkle (4 vols., Freiburg, 1901 sqq.); as well as Mansi, Concilia, xxxv. 345 sqq. Note also Carl Mirbt, Quellen, 2d ed, pp. 202–255. An English edition is by James Waterworth (London, 1848; With Essays on the External and Internal History of the Council).

The original acts and debates of the council, as prepared by its general secretary, Bishop Angelo Massarelli, in six large folio volumes, are deposited in the Vatican Library and remained there unpublished for more than 300 years and were brought to light, though only in part, by Augustin Theiner, priest of the oratory (d. 1874), in Acta genuina sancti et oecumenici Concilii Tridentini nunc primum integre edita (2 vols., Leipzig, 1874).

Most of the official documents and private reports, however, which bear upon the council, were made known in the 16th century and since. The most complete collection of them is that of J. Le Plat, Monumentorum ad historicam Concilii Tridentini collectio (7 vols., Leuven, 1781–87). New materials (Vienna, 1872); by JJI von Döllinger (Ungedruckte Berichte und Tagebücher zur Geschichte des Concilii von Trient, 2 parts, Nördlingen, 1876); and August von Druffel, Monumenta Tridentina (Munich, 1884–97).

== List of doctrinal decrees ==
Decree	Session	Date	Canons	Chapters
The Holy Scriptures	4	8 April 1546	none	1
Original sin	5	7 June 1546	5	4
Justification	6	13 January 1547	33	16
Sacraments	7	3 March 1547	13	1
Baptism	7	3 March 1547	14	none
Confirmation	7	4 March 1547	3	none
Holy Eucharist	13	11 October 1551	11	8
Penance	14	15 November 1551	15	15
Extreme Unction	14	4 November 1551	4	3
Matrimony	24	11 November 1563	12	10
Cults; Saints; Relics; Images	25	4 December 1563	none	3
Indulgences	25	4 December 1563	none	1

== Protestant response ==
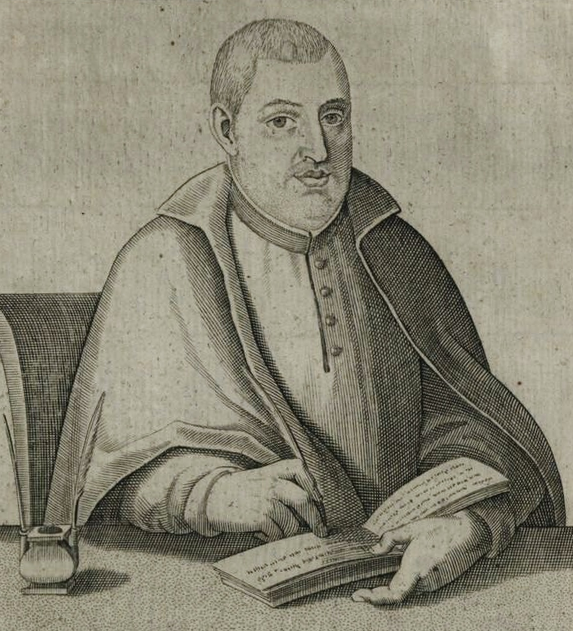
Andrada, a Catholic

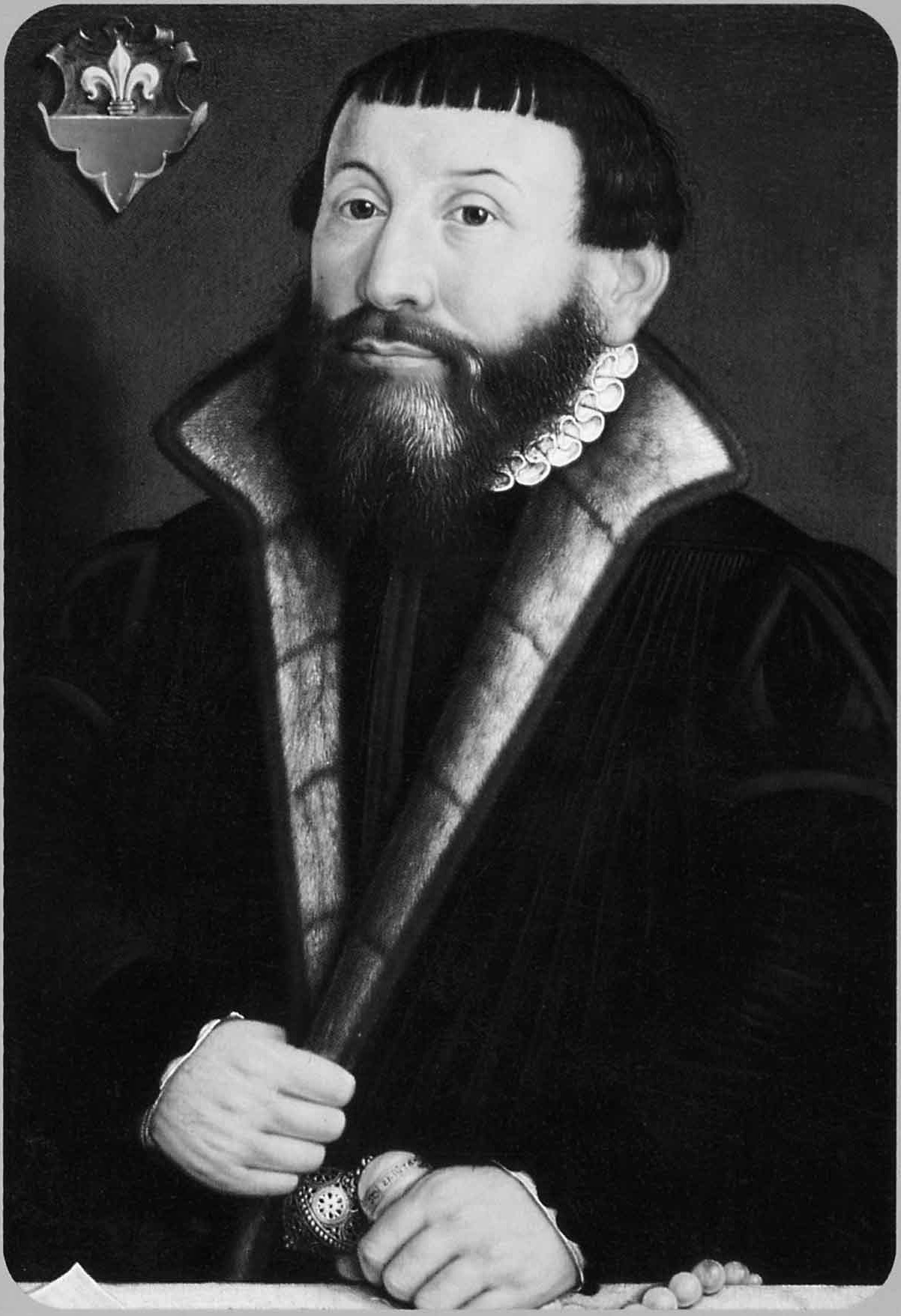
Chemnitz, a Lutheran

Out of 87 books written between 1546 and 1564 attacking the Council of Trent, 41 were written by Pier Paolo Vergerio, a former papal nuncio turned Protestant Reformer. The 1565–73 Examen decretorum Concilii Tridentini (Examination of the Council of Trent) by Martin Chemnitz was the main Lutheran response to the Council of Trent. Making extensive use of scripture and patristic sources, it was presented in response to a polemical writing which Diogo de Payva de Andrada had directed against Chemnitz. The Examen had four parts: Volume I examined sacred scripture, free will, original sin, justification, and good works. Volume II examined the sacraments, including baptism, confirmation, the sacrament of the Eucharist, communion under both kinds, the Mass, penance, extreme unction, holy orders, and matrimony. Volume III examined virginity, celibacy, purgatory, and the invocation of saints. Volume IV examined the relics of the saints, images, indulgences, fasting, the distinction of foods, and festivals.

In response, Andrada wrote the five-part Defensio Tridentinæ fidei, which was published posthumously in 1578. However, the Defensio did not circulate as extensively as the Examen, nor were full translations initially published. A French translation of the Examen by Eduard Preuss was published in 1861. German translations were published in 1861, 1884, and 1972. In English, a complete translation by Fred Kramer drawing from the original Latin and the 1861 German was published beginning in 1971.

== See also ==
- Nicolas Psaume, bishop of Verdun
- Black Legend (Spain)
- Popery
- Council of Jerusalem-Bethlehem
