= Diogo de Paiva de Andrade =

Portuguese theologian

Diogo de Payva de Andrada
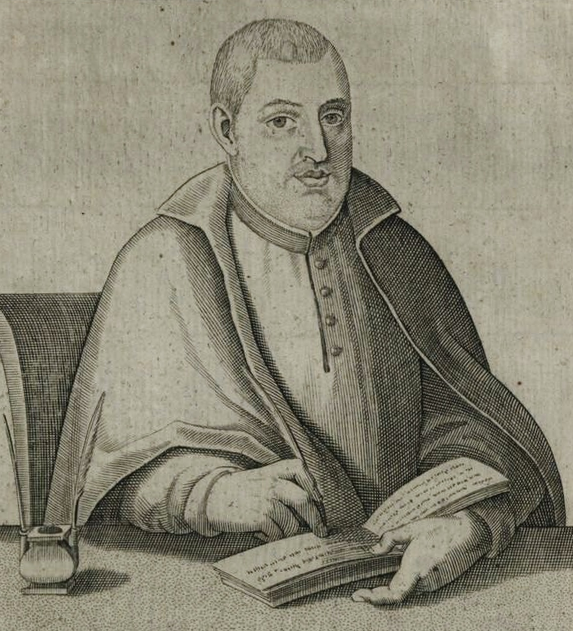
- Engraving by Pieter Perret
- Born: 26 July 1528; Coimbra, Portugal
- Died: 1 December 1575 (aged 47); Lisbon, Portugal
- Occupation: Theologian
- Notable work: Defensio tridentinae fidei catholicae et integerrimae (1578)

Diogo de Payva de Andrada (Note: Depending on the source, the spelling varies between "Payva" and "Paiva", "Andrada" and "Andrade"; another common variation is "Diogo Andrada de Payva".) (26 July 1528 – 1 December 1575) was Portuguese theologian of the sixteenth century.

== Biography ==
He was born at Coimbra, the son of the grand treasurer of João III. His original bent was towards foreign mission. After finishing his course at the University of Coimbra, he was ordained to the priesthood, and remained as professor of theology.

So great was his reputation that King Sebastian of Portugal appointed him theologian at the Council of Trent, 1561. Here he merited the special thanks of the Pope by an able work in defense of the papal authority. While at the council he wrote his "Decem libri orthodoxarum explicationum" (Venice, 1564, 1594; Cologne, 1564, 1574) against the work of Martin Chemnitz, "Theologiae Jesuitarum praecipua capita". In this book he discusses and defines the chief points of doctrine attacked by the heretics. Chemnitz answered by his well-known "Examen Concilii Tridentini", in reply to which Andrada produced his best work, "Defensio Tridentinae fidei" (Lisbon, 1578 and 1595).

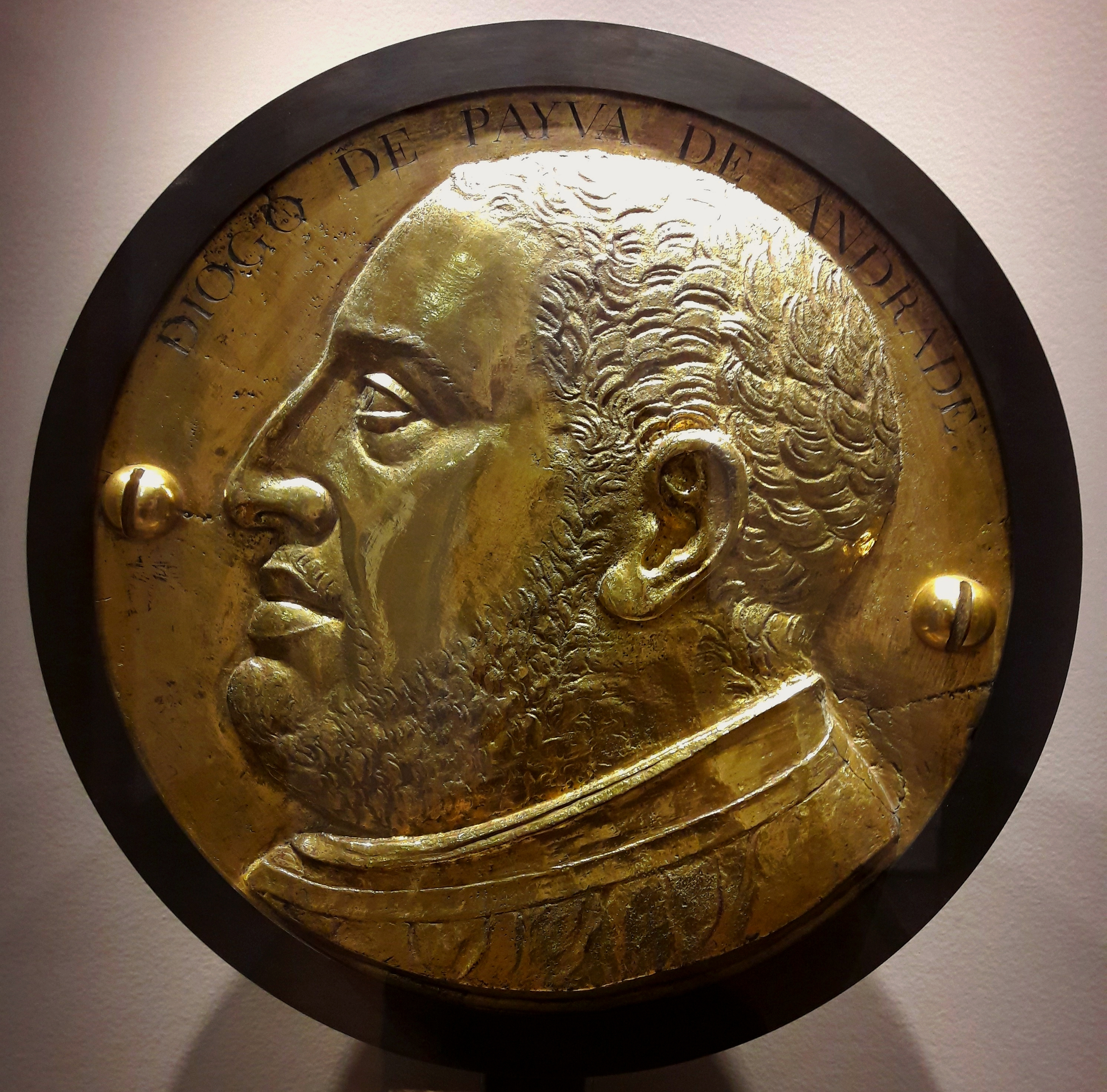
Bronze tondo with bust of Diogo de Payva de Andrada, Lisbon workshop, ca. 1575, National Museum of Ancient Art, Lisbon

Between 1562 and 1567, Diogo de Payva de Andrada published many controversial tracts, especially against the Lutheran, Martin Chemnitz. His first tract, De Societatis Jesu Origine, led to his being erroneously presumed a Jesuit. His De Conciliorum Auctoritate was welcomed at Rome as exalting the papal authority. Posthumous were his Defensio Tridentinæ fidei (1578) (remarkable for its learned statement of various opinions regarding the Immaculate Conception), and three sets of his sermons in Portuguese.

He published also three volumes of sermons in Portuguese. Payva de Andrada had not only a grasp of theological questions which won for him an important position among sixteenth-century theologians, but he was also so clear and convincing in the exposition of his arguments that he proved an admirable apologist, and it was matter of regret that his death prevented the completion of his great work, the Defensio Tridentinæ fidei This had progressed as far as the fifth session, inclusive of the doctrine upon the Immaculate Conception in defense of which it marshalled an imposing array of authorities.

Diego died, aged 47, at Lisbon. His nephew, Diogo, the younger (1586–1660), produced Chauleidos (1628) and other Latin poems, including sacred dramas, and a moral tract, Casamento Perfeito (1630); he also shone as an historical critic.
