= Anti-Protestantism =

Discrimination against Protestants

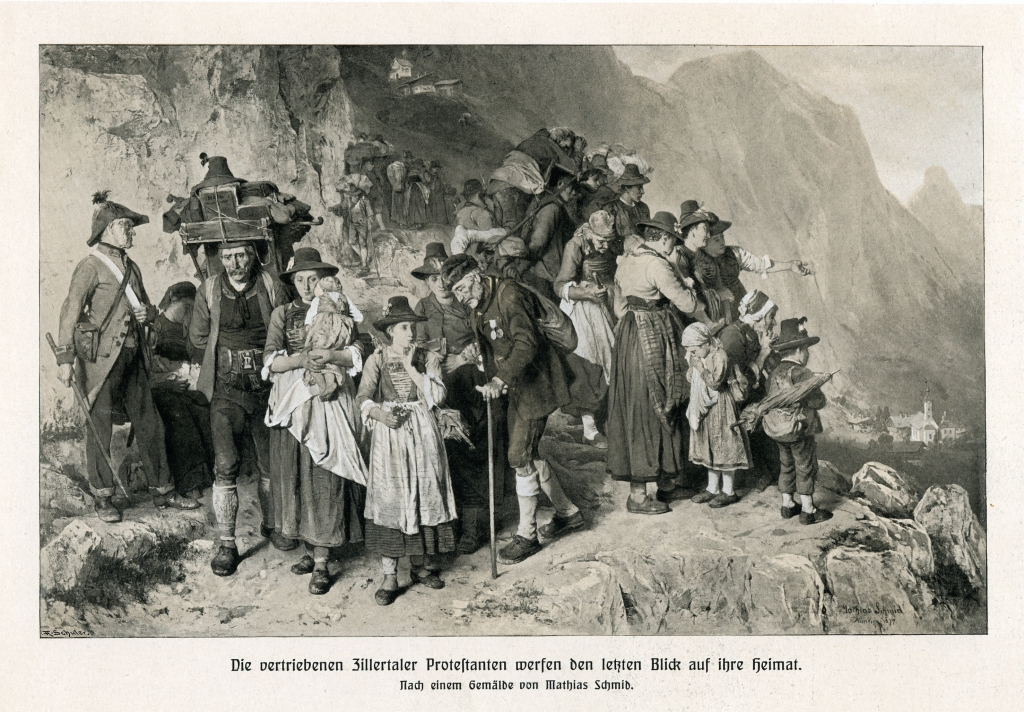
The Protestants from the Tyrolean Zillertal valley who were forced to leave their home in 1837

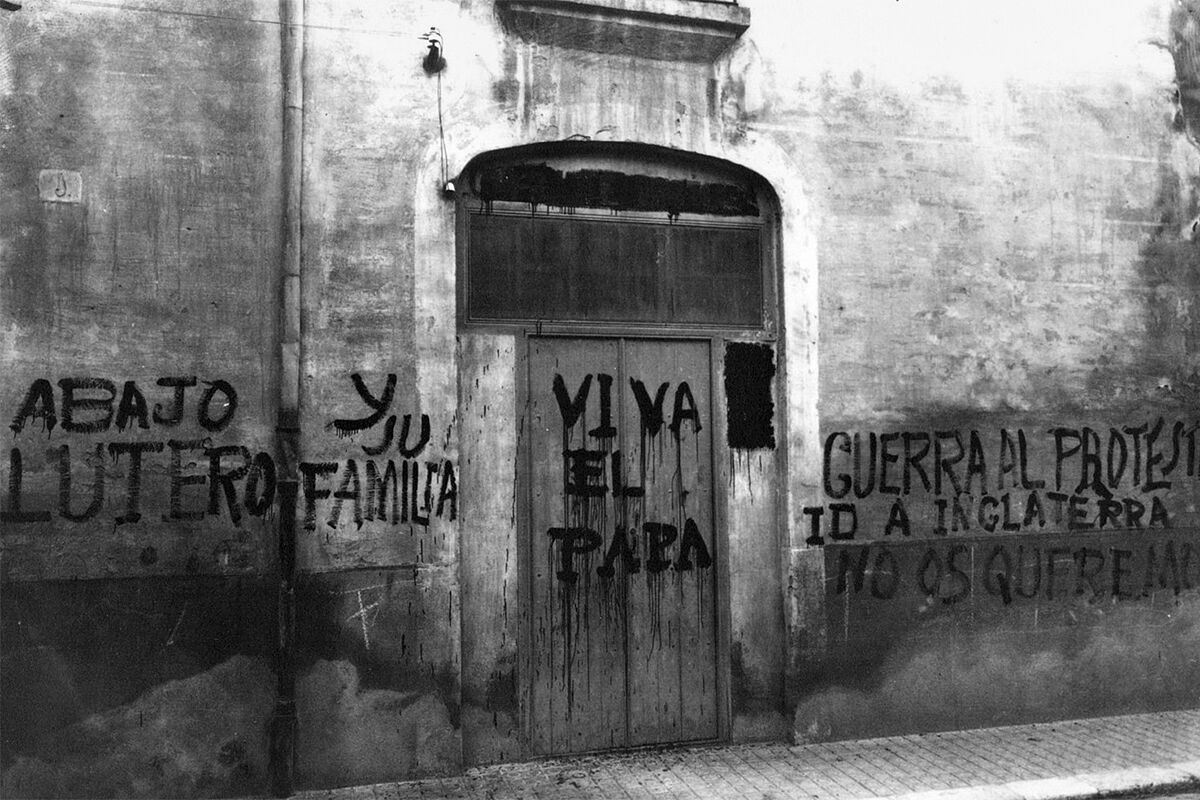
"Down with Luther and his family" / "Long live the Pope" / "War on the protestant. Go to England. We don't want you" — Graffiti on a Protestant church in Figueres, Girona (1947)

Anti-Protestantism is bias, hatred or distrust against some or all branches of Protestantism and/or its followers, especially when amplified in legal, political, ethic or military measures.

Protestants were not tolerated throughout most of Europe until the Peace of Augsburg of 1555 approved Lutheranism as an alternative for Roman Catholicism as a state religion of various states within the Holy Roman Empire of the German Nation. Calvinism was not recognized until the Peace of Westphalia of 1648. Other states, such as France, made similar agreements in the early stages of the Reformation. Poland–Lithuania had a long history of religious tolerance. However, the tolerance stopped after the Thirty Years' War in Germany, the persecution of Huguenots and the French Wars of Religion in France, the change in power between Protestant and Roman Catholic rulers after the death of Henry VIII of England in England, and the launch of the Counter-Reformation in Italy, Spain, Habsburg Austria and Poland-Lithuania. Anabaptism arose as a part of the Radical Reformation, lacking the support of the state which Lutheranism and Calvinism enjoyed, and thus was persecuted.

Protestants in Latin America were largely ostracized until the abolition of certain restrictions in the 20th century. Protestantism spread with Evangelicalism and Pentecostalism gaining the majority of followers. North America became a shelter for Protestants who were fleeing Europe after the persecution increased.

== History ==
=== Reformation ===
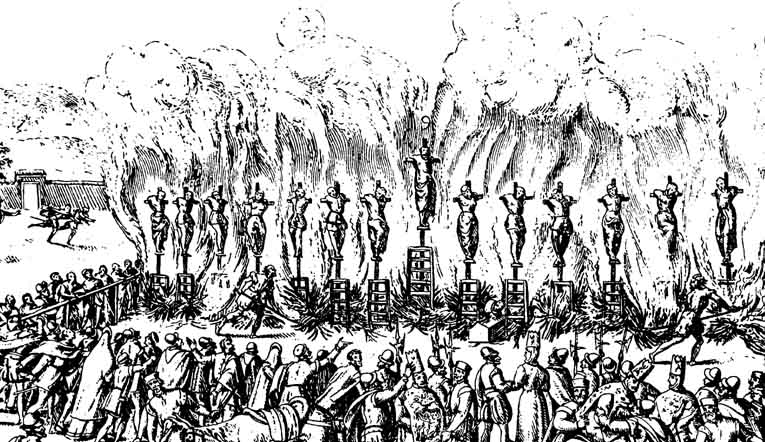
Auto-da-fé of Valladolid, Spain, in which fourteen Protestants were burned at the stake for their Lutheran faith, on 21 May 1559

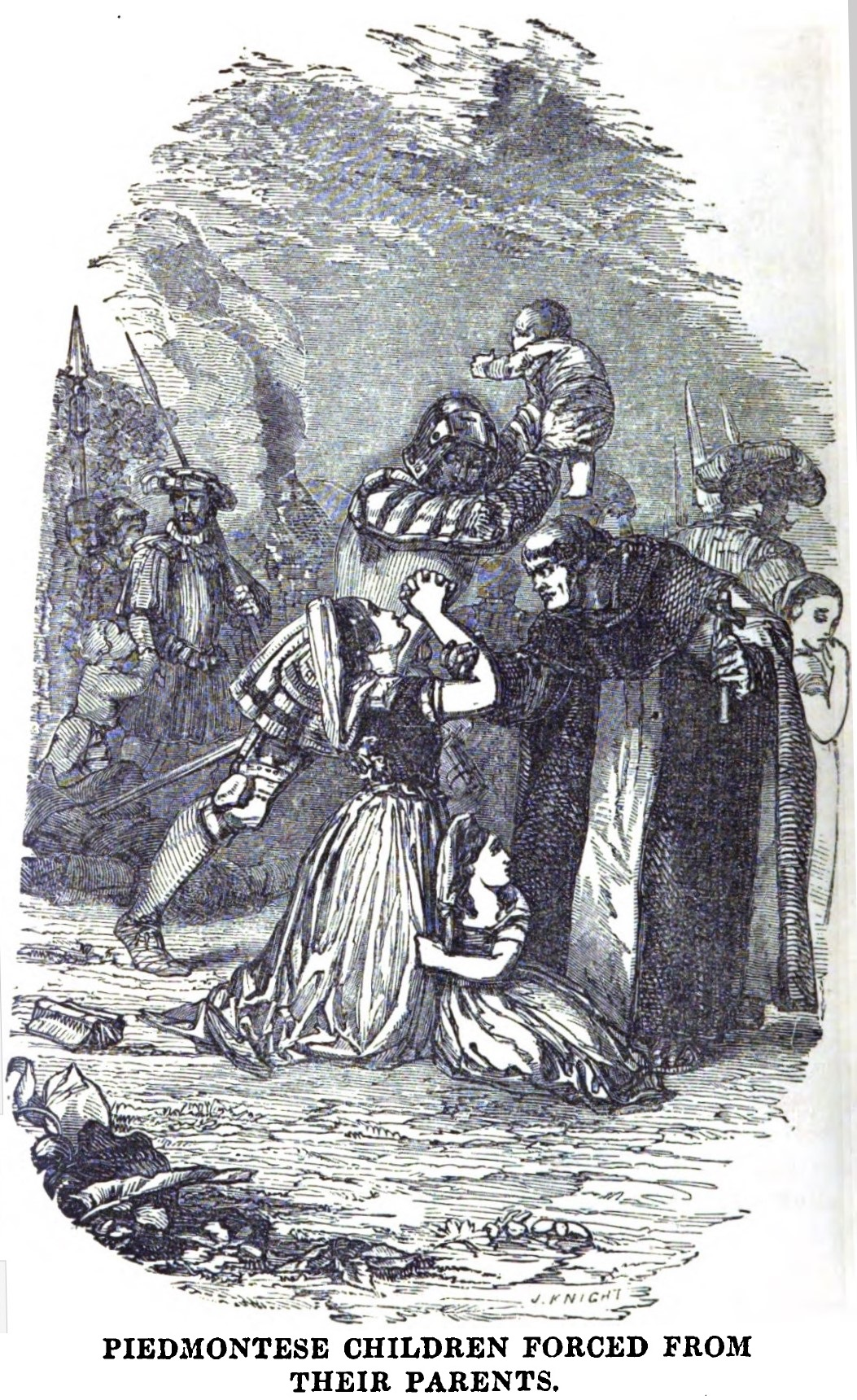
Piedmontese children forced from their parents (October 1853, X, p. 108)

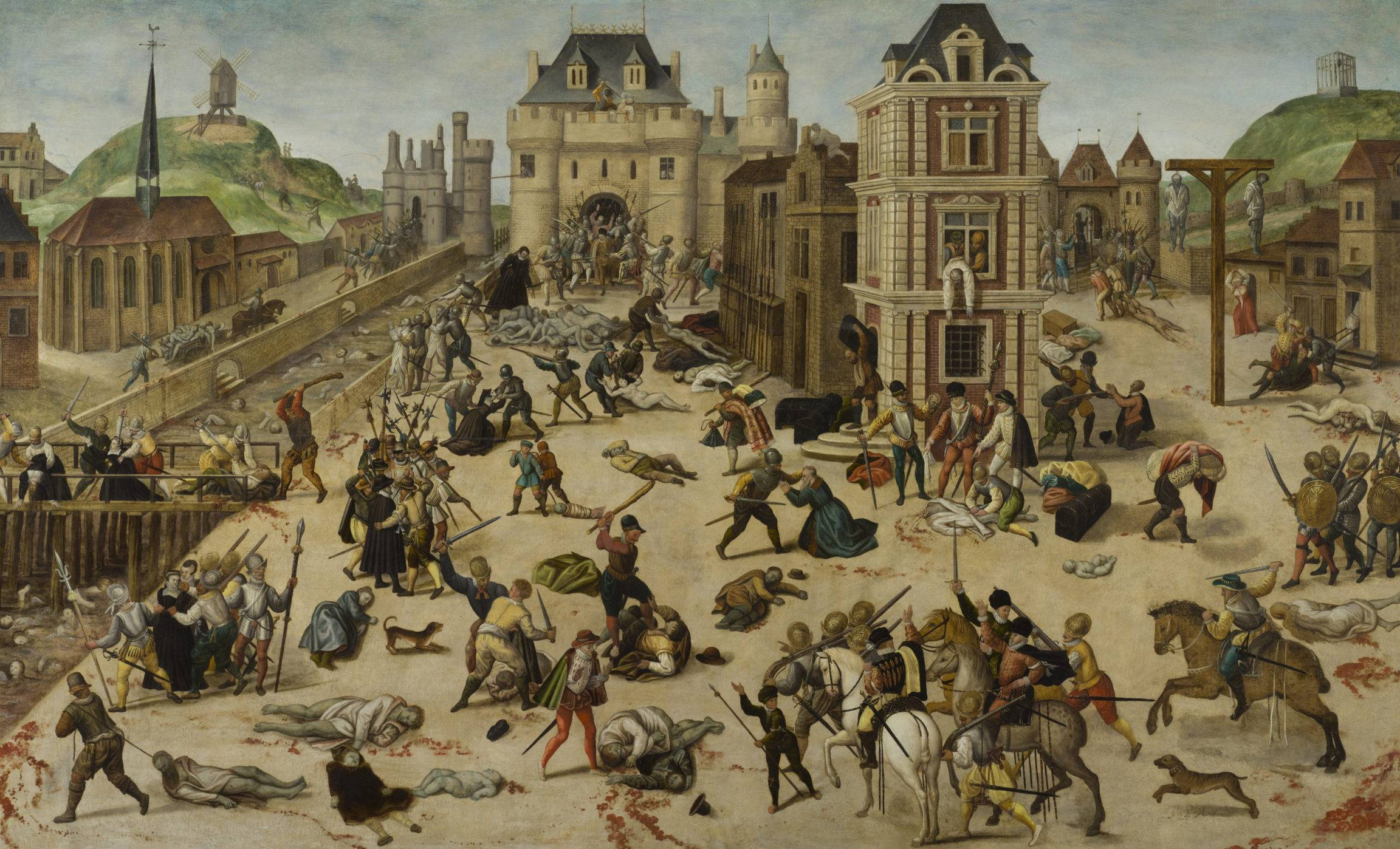
The Bartholomew's Day massacre

The Protestant Reformation led to a long period of warfare and communal violence between Catholic and Protestant factions, sometimes leading to massacres and forced suppression of the alternative views by the dominant faction in much of Europe.

Various European rulers supported or opposed Roman Catholicism for their own political reasons. After the Council of Trent and its Counter Reformation program, religion became an excuse or factor for territorial wars (the religious wars) and for periodic outbreaks of sectarian violence.

Anti-Protestantism originated in a reaction by the Catholic Church against the Reformation of the 16th century. Protestants, especially public ones, could be denounced as heretics and subject to prosecution in those territories, such as Spain, Italy and the Netherlands in which the Catholics were the dominant power. This movement was orchestrated by church and state as the Counter-Reformation.

There were religious wars and, in some countries though not in others, eruptions of sectarian hatred such as the St Bartholomew's Day Massacre of 1572, part of the French Wars of Religion.

Militant anti-Protestantism originated in a reaction by states and societies alarmed at the spread of Protestantism following the Protestant Reformation of the 16th century, frequently dated from Martin Luther's 95 Theses of 1517. By 1540, Pope Paul III had sanctioned the Society of Jesus (Jesuits) as the first religious society pledged to extinguish Protestantism.

=== Habsburg Europe ===
Protestantism was denounced as heresy, and those supporting these doctrines could be excommunicated as heretics. Thus by canon law and depending on the practice and policies of the particular Catholic country at the time, Protestants could be subject to prosecution and persecution: in those territories, such as Spain, Italy and the Netherlands, the Catholic rulers were then the dominant power. Some anti-Lutheran measures, such as the regional Spanish Inquisitions had begun earlier in response to the Reconquista and Morisco and Converso conversions.

After the defeat of the rebellious Protestant Estates of the Kingdom of Bohemia by the Habsburg monarchy at the Battle of White Mountain in 1620, the Habsburgs introduced a Counter-Reformation and forcibly converted all Bohemians, even the Utraquist Hussites, back to the Catholic Church. In 1624, Emperor Ferdinand II issued a patent that allowed only the Catholic religion in Bohemia. In the 1620s, Protestant nobility, burghers, and clergy of Bohemia and Austria were expelled from the Habsburg lands or forced to convert to Catholicism, and their lands were confiscated, while peasants were forced to adopt the religion of their new Catholic masters.

In a series of persecutions ending in 1731, over 20,000 Salzburg Protestants were expelled from their homeland by the Prince-Archbishops.

=== France ===
In France, from 1562 Catholics and Huguenots (Reformed Protestants) fought a series of wars until the Edict of Nantes brought religious peace in 1598. It affirmed Catholicism as the state religion but granted considerable toleration to Protestants. The religious toleration lasted until the reign of Louis XIV, who resumed persecution of Protestants and finally abolished their right to worship with the Edict of Fontainebleau in 1685.

=== Fascist Italy ===
In 1870 the newly formed Kingdom of Italy annexed the remaining Papal States, depriving the Pope of his temporal power. However, Papal rule over Italy was later restored by the Italian Fascist régime (albeit on a greatly diminished scale) in 1929 as head of the Vatican City state; under Mussolini's dictatorship, Catholicism became the state religion of Fascist Italy.

In 1938, the Italian Racial Laws and Manifesto of Race were promulgated by the Fascist régime to both outlaw and persecute Italian Jews, Evangelicals and Pentecostals. Thousands of Italian Jews and a small number of Protestants and Eastern Ortodoxs died in the Nazi concentration camps.

=== Francoist Spain ===
In Franco's authoritarian Spanish State (1936–1975), Protestantism was deliberately marginalized and persecuted. During the Civil War, Franco's regime persecuted the country's 30,000 Protestants, and forced many Protestant pastors to leave the country and various Protestant leaders were executed. Once authoritarian rule was established, non-Catholic Bibles were confiscated by police and Protestant schools were closed. Although the 1945 Spanish Bill of Rights granted freedom of private worship, Protestants suffered legal discrimination and non-Catholic religious services were not permitted publicly, to the extent that they could not be in buildings which had exterior signs indicating it was a house of worship and that public activities were prohibited.

=== Ireland ===
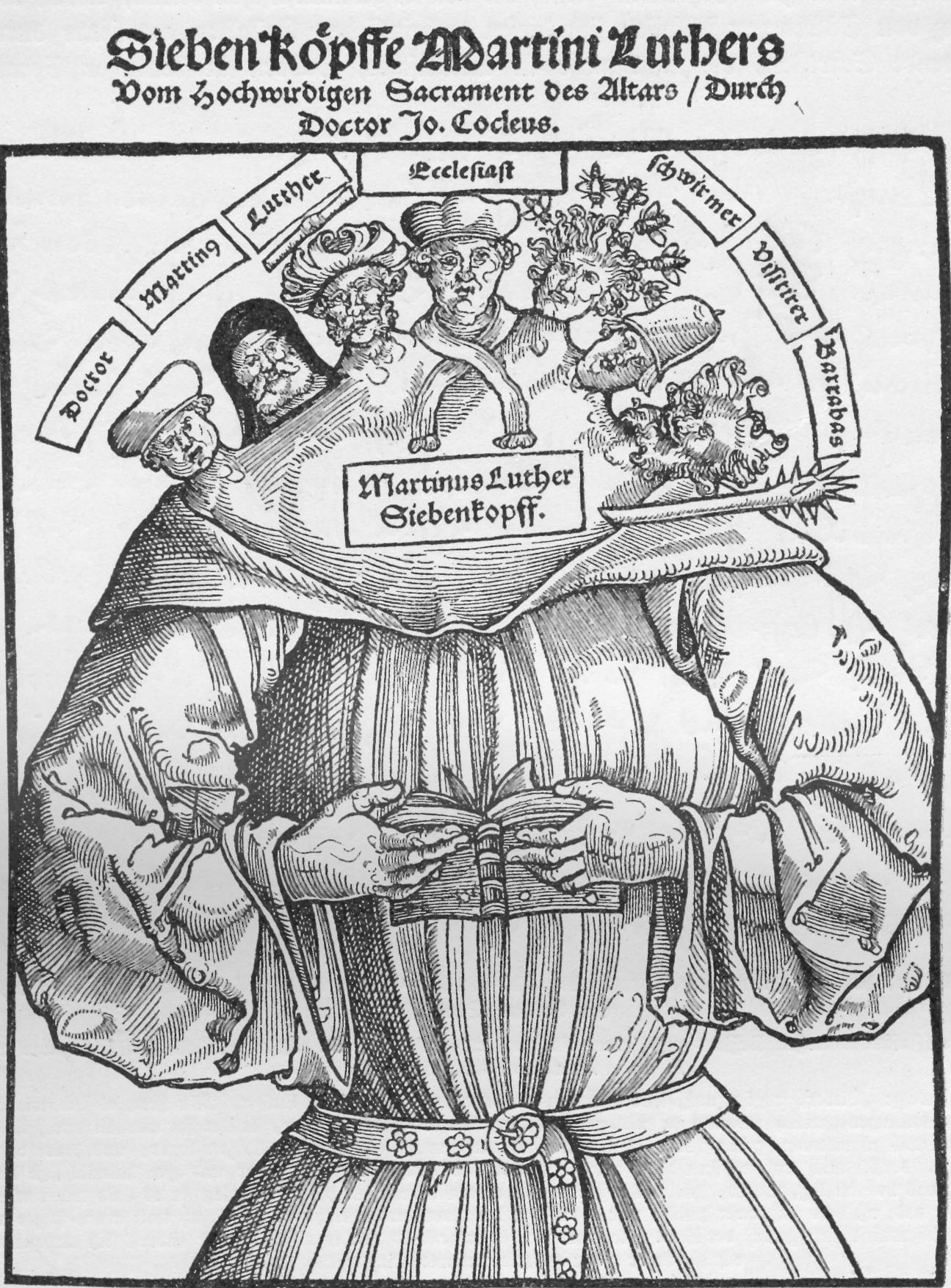
Woodcut showing Luther and the reformers as the Antichrist

In Northern Ireland or pre-Catholic emancipation Ireland, there is a hostility to Protestantism as a whole that has more to do with communal or nationalist sentiments than theological issues. During the Tudor conquest of Ireland by the Protestant state of England in the course of the 16th century, the Elizabethan state failed to convert Irish Catholics to Protestantism and thus followed a vigorous policy of confiscation, deportation, and resettlement. By dispossessing Catholics of their lands, and resettling Protestants on them, the official Government policy was to encourage a widespread campaign of proselytizing by Protestant settlers and establishment of English law in these areas. This led to a counter effort of the Counter Reformation by mostly Jesuit Catholic clergy to maintain the "old religion" of the people as the dominant religion in these regions. The result was that Catholicism came to be identified with a sense of nativism and Protestantism came to be identified with the State, as most Protestant communities were established by state policy, and Catholicism was viewed as treason to the state after this time. While Elizabeth I had initially tolerated private Catholic worship, this ended after Pope Pius V, in his 1570 papal bull Regnans in Excelsis, pronounced her to be illegitimate and unworthy of her subjects' allegiance.

The Penal Laws, first introduced in the early 17th century, were initially designed to force the native elite to conform to the state church by excluding non-Conformists and Roman Catholics from public office, and restricting land ownership, but were later, starting under Queen Elizabeth, also used to confiscate virtually all Catholic owned land and grant it to Protestant settlers from England and Scotland. The Penal Laws had a lasting effect on the population, due to their severity (celebrating Catholicism in any form was punishable by death or enslavement under the laws), and the favouritism granted Irish Anglicans served to polarise the community in terms of religion. Anti-Protestantism in Early Modern Ireland 1536–1691 thus was also largely a form of hostility to the colonisation of Ireland. Irish poetry of this era shows a marked antipathy to Protestantism, one such poem reading, "The faith of Christ [Catholicism] with the faith of Luther is like ashes in the snow". The mixture of resistance to colonization and religious disagreements led to widespread massacres of Protestant settlers in the Irish Rebellion of 1641. Subsequent religious or sectarian antipathy was fueled by the atrocities committed by both sides in the Irish Confederate Wars, especially the repression of Catholicism during and after the Cromwellian conquest of Ireland, when Irish Catholic land was confiscated en masse, clergy were executed and discriminatory legislation was passed against Catholics.

The Penal Laws against Catholics (and also Presbyterians) were renewed in the late 17th and early 18th centuries due to fear of Catholic support for Jacobitism after the Williamite War in Ireland and were slowly repealed in 1771–1829. Penal Laws against Presbyterians were relaxed by the Toleration Act 1719, due to their siding with the Jacobites in a 1715 rebellion. At the time the Penal Laws were in effect, Presbyterians and other non-Conformist Protestants left Ireland and settled in other countries. Some 250,000 left for the New World alone between the years 1717 and 1774, most of them arriving there from Ulster.

Sectarian conflict was continued in the late 18th century in the form of communal violence between rival Catholic and Protestant factions over land and trading rights (see Defenders (Ireland), Peep O'Day Boys and Orange Institution). The 1820s and 1830s in Ireland saw a major attempt by Protestant evangelists to convert Catholics, a campaign which caused great resentment among Catholics.

In modern Irish nationalism, anti-Protestantism is usually more nationalist than religious in tone. The main reason for this is the identification of Protestants with unionism – i.e. the support for the maintenance of the union with the United Kingdom, and opposition to Home Rule or Irish independence. In Northern Ireland, since the foundation of the Free State in 1921, Catholics, who were mainly nationalists, suffered systematic discrimination from the Protestant unionist majority.

The mixture of religious and national identities on both sides reinforces both anti-Catholic and anti-Protestant sectarian prejudice in the province.

More specifically religious anti-Protestantism in Ireland was evidenced by the acceptance of the Ne Temere decrees in the early 20th century, whereby the Catholic Church decreed that all children born into mixed Catholic-Protestant marriages had to be brought up as Catholics. Protestants in Northern Ireland had long held that their religious liberty would be threatened under a 32-county Republic of Ireland, due to that country's Constitutional support of a "special place" for the Roman Catholic Church. This article was deleted in 1972.

==== The Troubles ====
During The Troubles in Northern Ireland, Protestants with no connection to the security forces were occasionally targeted by Irish republican paramilitaries.

In 1974, two Protestant employees at a filling station on the Crumlin Road in Belfast were shot and killed by members of the IRA. In an alleged statement read out at the trial of one of the IRA members charged, the killings were said to have been planned in retaliation for the killings of two Catholics at another filling station.

In 1976, eleven Protestant workmen were shot by a group which was identified in a telephone call as the "South Armagh Republican Action Force". Ten of the men died, and the sole survivor said, "One man... did all the talking and proceeded to ask each of us our religion. Our Roman Catholic works colleague was ordered to clear off and the shooting started." A 2011 report from the Historical Enquiries Team (HET) found, "These dreadful murders were carried out by the Provisional IRA and none other."

In 1983, members of the Irish National Liberation Army (INLA) shot 10 worshippers who were attending a Protestant church service near the village of Darkley in County Armagh. Three of those shot were killed. The gunmen issued a statement, claiming to be from the "Catholic Reaction Force", and said that they "could easily have taken the lives of at least 20 more innocent Protestants". They demanded that loyalist paramilitarites "call an immediate halt to their vicious indiscriminate campaign against innocent Catholics", or the gunmen would "make the Darkley killings look like a picnic."

== See also ==
- Religious tolerance
- Anti-Christian sentiment
  - Anti-Catholicism
  - Anti-Eastern Orthodox sentiment
  - Anti-Oriental Orthodox sentiment
  - Anti-Mormonism
- Black legend (Spain)
- Counter-Reformation
- List of people burned as heretics
- Criticism of Protestantism
- Hindu terrorism
  - Violence against Christians in India
