= Defensio Tridentinæ fidei =

1578 book by Diogo de Payva de Andrada

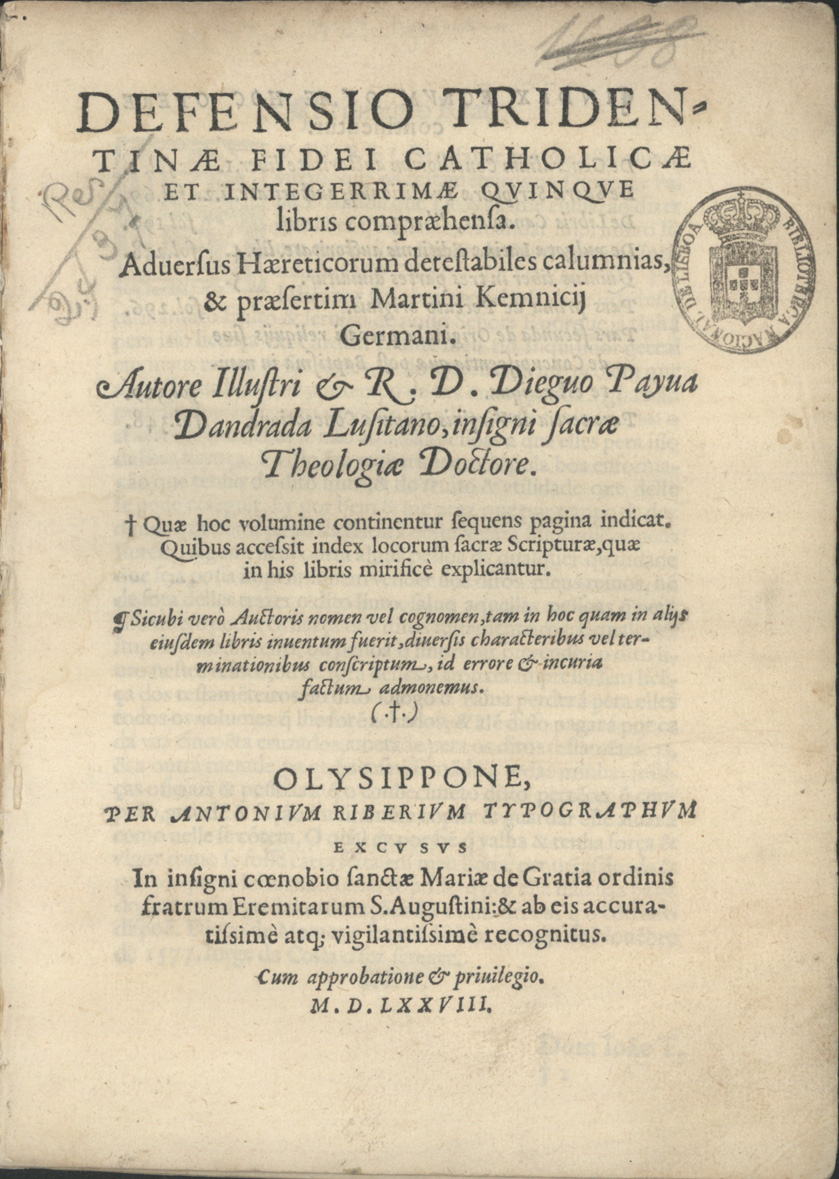
Title page of Defensio Tridentinæ fidei, 1578 edition, National Library of Portugal

Defensio Tridentinæ fidei (full title: Defensio Tridentinæ fidei catholicæ et integerrimæ quinque libris compræhensa aduersus hæreticorum detestabiles calumnias & præsertim Martini Kemnicij Germani, or "A Defence of the Catholic and Most Sound Faith of the Council of Trent, in five books, against the Detestable Calumnies of Heretics, and especially those of Martin Chemnitz") is a 716 page book first published in Lisbon, in 1578, written by Diogo de Payva de Andrada in response to Martin Chemnitz's Examen Concilii Tridentini (1565–73).

The dispute between Andrada and Chemnitz had gone back and forth since Chemnitz published Theologiae Jesuitarum praecipua capita in 1562. Andrada, then a delegate at the Council of Trent, replied with the ten-volume Orthodoxarum explicationum libri decem (1564), in which he discussed and defined the chief points of doctrine attacked by the Lutherans. Chemnitz's equally extensive reply came with the famous Examen Concilii Tridentini (1565–73) — to which Andrada replied with the Defensio, published posthumously in 1578 by Andrada's brothers: regarded as his best work, it is remarkable for its learned statement of various opinions regarding the Immaculate Conception. Nevertheless, even though the Defensio was reprinted in Cologne (1580) and Ingolstadt (1580 and 1592), it seems to have been less circulated in Europe than Chemnitz's Examen.
