= Examination of the Council of Trent =

1565–73 theological work by Martin Chemnitz

Examination of the Council of Trent (Latin: Examen Concilii Tridentini, 1565–73) is a large theological work of Lutheran Reformer Martin Chemnitz.

The work was published in Latin as four volumes. It includes the decrees and canons of the Council of Trent analysed from a Lutheran point of view.

R. Bendixen and Christoph Ernst Luthardt published a condensed version of 4 volume work Examen Concilii Tridentini, condensed to a single volume of 287 pages in 1884.

Examination of the Council of Trent has been translated into English by Fred Kramer and published by Concordia Publishing House, 1971–86.

Diogo de Payva de Andrada, a delegate at the Council of Trent, replied to Chemnitz's Examen with what is regarded as his best work: A Defence of the Faith of Trent, published in 1578. The doctrinal dispute between Andrada and Chemnitz had gone back and forth since Chemnitz had first published Theologiae Jesuitarum praecipua capita, in 1562.
