= Martin Chemnitz =

German Lutheran theologian and reformer

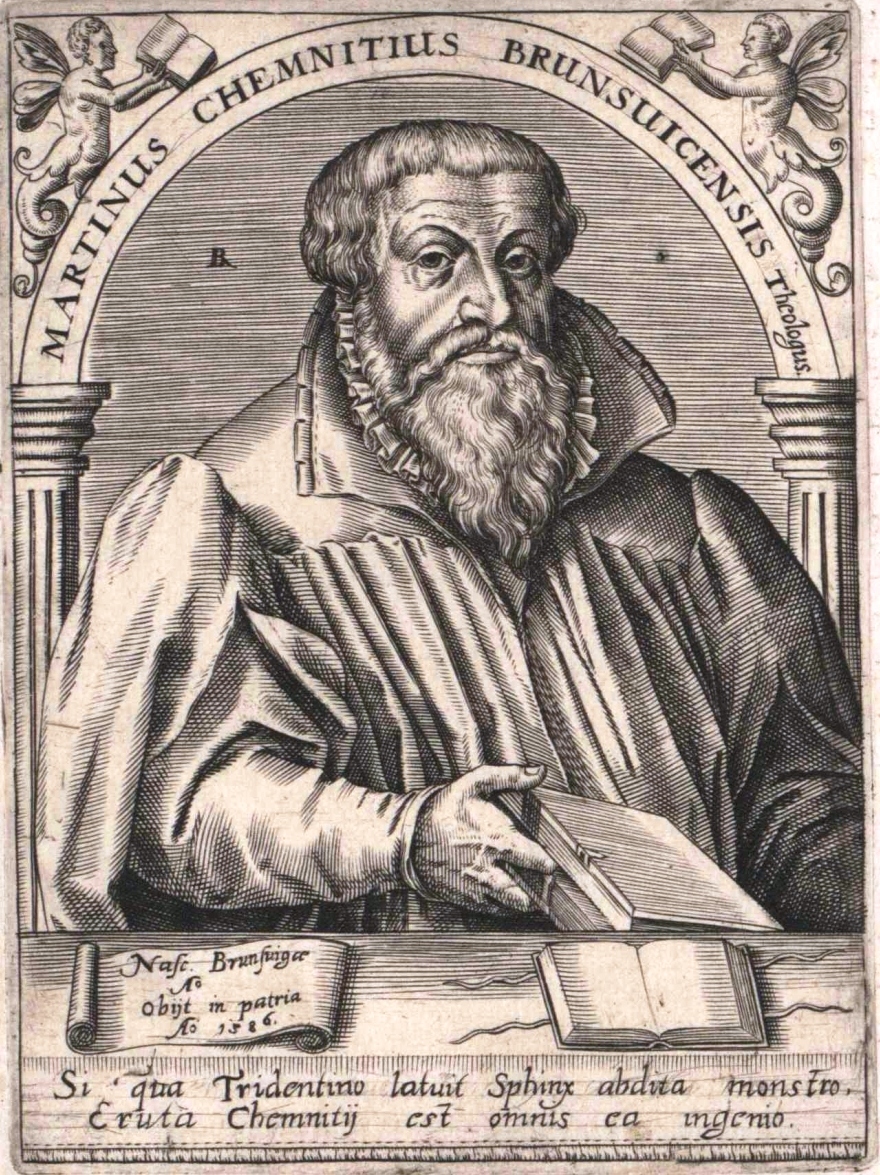
- Portrait by Robert Boissard, c. 1600
- Born: 9 November 1522; Treuenbrietzen, Margraviate of Brandenburg in the Holy Roman Empire
- Died: 8 April 1586 (aged 63); Braunschweig, Duchy of Brunswick-Lüneburg in the Holy Roman Empire
- Era: Reformation
- Notable work: Formula of Concord (with Jakob Andreae), Book of Concord (1580), (with Jakob Andreae)

Martin Chemnitz (9 November 1522 – 8 April 1586) was a second-generation German, Evangelical Lutheran, Christian theologian, and a Protestant reformer, churchman, and confessor. In the Evangelical Lutheran tradition he is known as Alter Martinus, the "Second Martin": Si Martinus non fuisset, Martinus vix stetisset ("If Martin [Chemnitz] had not come along, Martin [Luther] would hardly have survived") goes a common saying concerning him. He is listed and remembered in the Calendar of Saints and Commemorations in the Liturgical Church Year as a pastor and confessor by both the Evangelical Lutheran Church in America and Lutheran Church – Missouri Synod.

== Early life and education ==
Chemnitz, born in Treuenbrietzen in Brandenburg to Paul and Euphemia Chemnitz, was the last of three children. His older siblings' names were Matthew and Ursula. His father was a successful merchant who died when Martin was eleven: thereafter, the family suffered from financial difficulties.

When he was old enough, Martin matriculated in Magdeburg. Upon completion of the course work, he became a weaver's apprentice. He helped his family with its clothing business for the next few years. When he was 20, he resumed his education at the University of Frankfurt (Oder). He remained in school until his finances were exhausted; he then took a teaching job in the town of Wriezen, supplementing his income by collecting the local sales tax on fish. His time at Frankfurt gave him the basic tools to continue his education on his own, researching areas in which he was interested and applying his naturally inquisitive mind to problems that others had worried over in the past.

In 1545 Chemnitz accompanied his cousin Georg Sabinus to school at the University of Wittenberg in Wittenberg, Germany (1545–1547), where he studied under Martin Luther (1483-1546) and Philip Melanchthon (1497-1560). From Melanchthon he learned to shape his theological education, beginning with the difference between "law" and "gospel". In Chemnitz's words, though he heard Luther lecture often, he "did not pay Luther the attention he should have." (cf. Autobiography) Because of Luther's death and political events, Chemnitz transferred to the University of Königsberg (1547–1548). Chemnitz graduated in the first class with a Master of Arts degree (1548). However, a plague soon infested the Baltic Sea Hanseatic German port town of Königsberg in East Prussia, (today renamed Kaliningrad since occupied by the Soviet Union in 1945 at the end of World War II, now annexed into the Russian Federation) so Chemnitz left quickly for Saalfeld. When he judged it safe, Chemnitz returned to Königsberg in 1550, now employed by Albert, Duke of Prussia, as the court librarian for the Konigsberg State and University Library. In return for caring for the library and teaching a few courses as a tutor, he had unrestricted access to what was then considered one of the finest libraries in Europe (and unfortunately later damaged and lost with its contents and elaborate building 400 years later during the battles swirling around the Prussian city on the Eastern Front of the Second World War in 1944–1945).

For the first time Chemnitz applied himself completely to theological study. During these years his interest shifted from astrology, which he had studied in Magdeburg, to theology. He began his own course of study by carefully working through the Bible in the original languages of Hebrew and Ancient Greek with the goal of answering questions that had previously puzzled him. When he felt ready to move on, he turned his attention to the early theologians of the Church, whose writings he read slowly and carefully. Then he turned to current theological concerns, again reading slowly while painstakingly making copious notes. This early method of Lutheran scholastic self-study had been suggested by Melanchthon in his Writings (cf. Autobiography).

== His vocation as reformer, churchman, and theologian ==
Chemnitz moved back to Wittenberg in 1553 as a guest of Melanchthon. In January 1554 he joined the Wittenberg University faculty. He lectured on Melanchthon's Loci Communes, from which lectures he compiled his own Loci Theologici, a system of theology. He was ordained to the ministry on 26 November 1554 by Johannes Bugenhagen (1485-1558). He served in Braunschweig from 1554 to 1567. He also became co-adjutor of Joachim Mörlin (1514-1571), who was ecclesiastical superintendent for the Duchy of Brunswick-Wolfenbüttel. When Mörlin resigned in 1567, Chemnitz became his successor; he held the post for the rest of his life.

Through his leadership, Brunswick-Wolfenbüttel was brought firmly into Evangelical Lutheranism. There he helped his prince, Duke Julius of Brunswick-Wolfenbüttel, establish the University of Helmstedt (1575–76). With Jakob Andreae, David Chytraeus, Nicholas Selnecker, Andrew Musculus and others, Chemnitz took part in a centrist movement that brought agreement among German Lutherans in the writing and publication of the Formula of Concord (1577), of which Chemnitz was one of the primary authors. He was instrumental in the publication of the definitive Book of Concord: Confessions of the Evangelical Lutheran Church presented in 1580, containing a series of important earlier confessional theological documents, treatises, commentaries, catechisms as the compilation of the doctrinal standard of the Evangelical Lutheran Church. Other major works are Examen Concilii Tridentini (Examination of the Council of Trent) and De Duabis Naturis in Christo (On the Two Natures in Christ). These works demonstrate Martin Chemnitz's abilities as a biblical, doctrinal and historical theologian in the orthodox Lutheran tradition. He died in Braunschweig.

== Family ==
Chemnitz married Anna Jaeger in 1555 and they had ten children.

== Works ==
=== Autobiography ===
- Martin Chemnitii einhändige Lebens-Beschreibung. Nebst denen ihm zu Braunschweig gesetzen Epitaphiis [Martin Chemnitz's Submitted Life-Description {Autobiography}. Together with the Epitaphs Erected to Him in Braunschweig]. 1719. Translated into English as An Autobiography of Martin Chemnitz. A.L. Graebner, trans. Theological Quarterly, vol. 3, no. 4 (1899).

=== Church government and oversight ===
- Brevis et Simplex Forma Examinis de Praecipuis Doctrinae Caelestis Capitibus [Brief and Simple Form of Examination concerning the Principal Chapters of Celestial Doctrine]. 1571.
- Kirchen-Ordnung, wie es mit Lehr und Ceremonien des Fürstenthums-Braunschweig [Church Order, As to Doctrine and Ceremonies, of the Duchy of Braunschweig]. 1569.
- Ministry, Word, and Sacraments: An Enchiridion. Luther Poellot, trans. St. Louis: Concordia Publishing House, 1981. (Originally published in 1593 [German] and 1603 [Latin] as Enchiridion D. Martini Chemnitii.)
- Ein Schone vnnd richtige Form zu beichten [A Good and Proper Form for Confess{ing} {One's Sins}]. 1603.

=== Confessions of faith and documents relating to the Formula of Concord ===
- Acta formulae concordiae in Bergensi coenobio prope Magdeburgum [Records of the Formula of Concord in Bergen Abbey near Magdeburg]. 1707 with Nicholas Selnecker. (The deliberations of the writers of the Formula of Concord to finalize that document).
- Apologia, oder Verantwortung deẞ Christlichen ConcordienBuchs, which appeared in Latin translation as Apologia libri Christianae concordiae [literally: Apology of the Christian Book of Concord]. with Timothy Kirchner and Nicolaus Selneccer, 1583. (known as The Apology of the Formula of Concord)
- Christliches Bedenken auf Doct. Majors Repetitio und endliche Erklärung belangend den Streit [Christian Reflections on Dr. Major's {work}, "Repetitio," and Finally {an} Explanation As Far As the Controversy Is Concerned]. 1568.
- Confessio ministeri Saxoni Konfession und Erklärung [Confession of the Ministers of Saxony: Confession and Explanation]. 1571. (Text in German).
- Corpus doctrinae Prutenicum [The Prussian Body of Doctrine]. 1568. (An Anthology of Lutheran Statements of Faith for the German domain of Prussia)
- Corpus doctrinae Julium [The {Duke} Julius Body of Doctrine]. 1576. (An Anthology of Lutheran Statements of Faith for Duke Julius's Duchy of Brunswick-Wolfenbüttel).
- Formulae Recte Sentiendi de Praecipuis Horum Temporum Controversiis [Forms of Thinking Correctly concerning the Chief Controversies of These Times]. 1576 (Found in the Corpus Doctrinae Wilhelminum and the Corpus Doctrinae Iulium).
- Judicium de Controversiis qvibusdam circa qvosdam A.C. articulos. 1594. Also known as: De Controversiis quibusdam, quae superiori tempore circa quosdam Augustanae Confessionis articulos motae agitatae sunt, Iudicium d. Martini Chemnitii, Polycarp Leyser, ed. Wittenberg, 1594 [Judgment on Certain Controversies concerning Certain Articles of the Augsburg Confession Which Have Recently Arisen and Caused Controversy].
- Solida ac vera Confessionis Augustanae historie ... [History of the Solid and True Augsburg Confession] with Timothy Kirchner and Nicholas Selnecker, 1585.
- Wiederholte Christi gemeine Confession der Sächischen Kirchen [Reiterated Christian General Confession of the Saxon Church].

=== Homiletical and devotional writings ===
- Andächtige Gebete wider die Teuffel in den armen besessen Leuten [Devout Prayers against the Devil in the Poor Possessed People]. 1596.
- Eine andere Predigt von auffrichtung Christlicher Schulen [Another Sermon on the Erecting of Christian Schools]. 1573.
- Consilium ... de lectione patrum [Counsel ... On the Reading of the {church} Fathers]. 1616.
- Echt evangelische aulegung de Sonn- und Festtags-evangelien des kirchenjahrs [Genuinely Evangelical Interpretation of the Sunday and Feastday Gospels of the Church Year]. 1872–1878.
  - Erster Band
  - Zweiter Band
  - Dritter Band
  - Vierter Band
  - Fünfter Band
  - Sechster Band
  - Siebenter Band
- Harmoniae Evangelicae [Harmony of the Gospels]. 1593.
- Historia der Passion Christi [History of the Passion of Christ]. 1590.
- Leich-Pred., Herrn Victor Beseken, gewessen Bürgemeisters in Bremen [Funeral Sermon for Lord Victor Beseken, Former Mayor of Bremen] 1612.
- Leich-Predigt, in funere Christoph von Blanckenburg, anno 1573 gethan [Funeral Sermon, at the Burial of Christoph von Blanckenburg, given in the Year 1573]. 1578.
- Oratio de Lectione Patrum, habita [Oration Concerning the Reading of the Fathers, Delivered ...]. 1554.
- Oratio habita in Introductione Universitatis Juliae [{An} Oration Delivered at the Introduction of the University of {Duke} Julius]. 1576
- Oratio panegyrica, das ist, Trost- und Ehren-Predigt bey des weyland ... M. Chemnitii ... Leichbestätigung [Panegyrical Oration, that is, Comforting and Honoring Sermon of M. Chemnitz at the formerly ... Burial]. 1627.
- Postilla: oder Auslegung der Euangelien welche auff die Sontage, auch die fürnembste Fest und Apostel Tage in der Gemeine Gottes abgelesen und erkläret werden [Postils: Or Interpretation of the Gospels, which on the Sundays, also the Foremost Feast and Apostle Days, in the Congregation of God Are Read and Explained]. 1593.
- Postille, oder Erklärung der ordentlichen Sonn- und Fest-Tags Evangelien [Postil, or Explanation of the Proper Sun- and Feastdays' Gospels]. 1594.
- Predigt am Sonntag Septuagesima [Sermon for Septuagesima Sunday]. 1866.
- Eine Predigt bey der Einführung der Julius-Universität zu Helmstedt [A Sermon at the Introduction of the {Duke} Julius-University at Helmstedt]. [German text of Oratio habita in Introductione Universitatis Juliae] 1576.
- Eine Predigt über das Evangelion Matthew 22 [A Sermon on Matthew 22]. 1573.
- Ein Predigt ... über John 3:1-15 (über Luke 18:9-14) [A Sermon ... on John 3:1-15 (on Luke 18:9-14)]. 1856–1886.

=== Letters ===
- Epistola de coena Domini in tertiam Apologiam Bezae [Letter Concerning the Lord's Supper in the Third Apology of Beza].
- Epistolae Martini Chemnitii ad Matthiam Ritterum [Letters of Martin Chemnitz to Matthias Ritter].

=== Preface to a work by Heinrich Bünting ===
- Prefatio Doctoris M. Chemnitij [to] Heinrich Bünting's Itineranium et Chronicon ecclesiasticum totius Sacrae Scriptureae [Preface of Doctor M{artin} Chemnitz to Heinrich Bünting's Itinerary and Ecclesiastical Chronicle of All the Holy Scriptures]. 1581.

=== Reports and task force studies (Gutachten) ===
- Bedencken: An justum sit, fures punire suspendie [Reflection: Whether It Be Just, to Punish Thieves By Hanging].
- Bedencken der Theologen zu Braunschwiegk/von dem newen Wittenbergischen Catchismo gestallet/der gantzen Christenheit zur Warnung ausgengen [Reflection of the Theologians of Braunschweig on the New Placed Wittenberg Catechism to All Christendom Sent Out As a Warning]. 1571. (This document helped Elector August of Saxony uncover a plot to undermine the Lutheran faith of his duchy on the part of Crypto-Calvinist ministers and teachers.)
- Bedencken: Ob die Worte der Einsetzung notwendig müssen recitiret werden? [Reflection: Whether the Words of Institution {of the Lord's Supper} Must Necessarily Be Recited].
- Bedencken von Beruff und Enterlaubung der Predigter [Reflection on the Call and Authorization of Preachers].
- Bericht vom newen Baptischen Gregoriano Calendario, an den Landgraffen zu Hessen [Report on the New Papal Gregorian calendar, to the Landgrave of Hesse]. 1584. (Chemnitz had been trained as an astrologer, and he was consulted on the advisability of adopting the new 1582 Gregorian calendar in place of the old Julian calendar.)
- Bericht von Gelegenheit und Unterschiedt der Herzogstümer Schleswig und Holtzstein [Report on {the} Location and Division of the Duchies of Schleswig and Holtstein]. 1629.
- Consilium de vitandis Calvinianis [Counsel On Avoiding Calvinists]. 1623.
- De coelibatu judicium [Judgment Concerning Celibacy ]. 1623.
- Judicium de Calendario Gregoriano [Judgment concerning the Gregorian calendar ].
- Judicium von der Nohtwehre [Judgment concerning Self-Defense]. 1623.
- Monita Chemnitiana oder heilsame Erinnerungen ehmals von D. Martino Chemnitio bey solenner Einführung der Julius-Universität [Chemnitian {Chemnitz} Admonitions or Salutary Reminders Formerly by Dr. Martin Chemnitz at the Solemn Introduction of the {Duke} Julius University]. 1716.

=== Scholastic disputation ===
- Disputatio Theologica de Beneficiis Filii Dei, Domini, & Redemptoris nostri JESU CHRISTI, pro summis in Theologia honoribus consequendis habita [Theological Disputation Concerning the Blessings of the Son of God, Our Lord and Redeemer Jesus Christ, Held for the Highest Suitable Honors in Theology]. 1568 (A theological disputation qualifying someone for a doctorate in theology).

=== Theological treatises ===
- Anatome Propositionum Alberti Hardenbergii de Coena Domini [Anatomy/Dissection of the Propositions of Albert Hardenberg on the Lord's Supper]. 1561.
- Bekäntnitz von der ubiquität [Confession on Ubiquity]. 1623. (A document that presents Chemnitz's position on the doctrine of the omnipresence of Christ's human nature)
- De incarnatione filii Dei item de officio et maiestate Christi tractus [Treatise on the Incarnation of the Son of God, Also on the Office and Majesty of Christ]. 1865.
- De origine Jeswitarum, et quo concilio secta illa recens instituta sit [On the Origin of the Jesuits, and Counsel Concerning Which That Sect Is Recently Instituted]. 1611.
- Examination of the Council of Trent. Fred Kramer, trans. 4 vols. St. Louis: Concordia Publishing House, 1971-86 (Originally published in 1565-73 as Examen Concilii Tridentini.)
- Loci Theologici. J. A. O. Preus, trans. St. Louis: Concordia Publishing House, 1989; Justification: The Chief Article of Christian Doctrine as Expoiunded in Loci Theologici. J.A.O Preus, trans. St. Louis: Concordia Publishing House, 1985 (Originally published in 1591 as Loci Theologici.)
  - Chapter on Almsgiving from Loci Theologici, translated into English in .pdf format
- The Lord's Prayer. Georg Williams, trans. St. Louis: Concordia Publishing House, 1999 (Originally published in English translation as A Svbstantial and godly exposition of the praier commonly called the Lords prayer. Cambridge, 1598; the original Latin text, never published, has been lost).
- The Lord's Supper. J. A. O. Preus, trans. St. Louis: Concordia Publishing House, 1979. (Originally published in 1561 as Repititio sanae doctrinae de vera praesentia corporis et sangvinis Domini in Coena.)
- Martini Kemnitinii Von der Jesuwiten ankunfft unnd ursprung [Martin Chemnitz on the Arrival and Origin of the Jesuits]. 1586.
- Ob ein Prediger am Ältare sich selbst communiciren möge [Whether a Preacher at the Altar Might Commune Himself]. 1623.
- Richtige und inn H. Schrifft wolgegründte Erklarung / entlicher hochwichtiger und nötiger Artickel unser Christlichen Religion / in sonderliche Tractat und Predigten gefasset [An Explanation, Correct and Well-Grounded in Holy Scripture, of Quite a Few Highly Important and Necessary Articles of Our Christian Religion Contained in Special Treatises and Sermons]. 1592.
- Theologiæ Jesuitarum Brevis ac Nervosa Descriptio et Delineatio: Ex Præcipuis Capitibus Censuræ ipsorum, quæ Anno MDLX. Coloniæ edita est [A Brief and Bold Description and Delineation of the Theology of the Jesuits: From the Principal Chapters of Their Own Opinions, the Year of Which {is} 1560]. 1560.
- Theses quaedam de unione duarum naturarum in Christo hypostatica: item de officiis et maiestate Christi Mediatoris [Some Theses Concerning the Hypostatic Union of the Two Natures in Christ: That Is, Concerning the Offices and Majesty of Christ the Mediator]. 1558.
- Tract. de Imagine DEI in homine [Treatise on the Image of God in Man]. 1570.
- The Two Natures of Christ. J. A. O. Preus, trans. St. Louis: Concordia Publishing House, 1971. (Originally published in 1578 as De Duabus Naturis in Christo: De hypostatica earum unione: De communicatione idiomaticum; a shorter edition was published in 1570.)
- Veritas religionis Lutheranae defensa [Defense of the Truth of the Lutheran Religion]. (Text in German).
- Von der ewigen gnadenwahl [On the Eternal Election of Grace]. 1892.

== Biographies and research on Chemnitz ==
- Antiqvitates Ecclestiaticae inclytae urbis Braunsvigae, oder: Der Beruhmten Stadt Braunschweig Kirchenhistorie. by Philippo Julio Rehtmeyer. Braunschweig: Gedruckt Verlagt von Christoph Friedrich Zilligers, 1710.
- The Doctrine of Man in Classical Lutheran Theology edited by Herman A. Preus and Edmund Smits. Minneapolis: Augsburg Publishing House, 1962.
- Formulators of the Formula of Concord. by Theodore R. Jungkuntz. St. Louis: Concordia Publishing House, 1977.
- Grundlinien der Theolgie des Martin Chemnitz by G. Noth, 1930.
- Loci Theologici; De Coena Domini; De Duabus Naturis in Christo; Theologiae Jesuitarum. Chelsea, Michigan: Sheridan Books, 2000. [Facsimile reprint of a 1653 anthology of these four treatises of Chemnitz in Latin by the Lutheran Heritage Foundation].
- Martin Chemnitz nach seinem Leben und Wirken by H. Hachfeld, 1867.
- "Martin Chemnitz' Views on Trent: The Genesis and the Genius of the Examen Concilii Tridentini" by Arthur C. Piepkorn, Concordia Theological Monthly XXXVII [37](January 1966):5–37.
- Die Polemik des Martin Chemnitz gegen das Konzil von Trent by R. Mumm, Leipzig, 1905.
- The Second Martin: The Life and Theology of Martin Chemnitz. by J. A. O. Preus. St. Louis: Concordia Publishing House, 1994.
- "The Works of Martin Chemnitz," by D. Georg Williams. Concordia Theological Quarterly. Vol. 42, 1978.
- Der Zweite Martin der Lutherischen Kirche, Festschrift zum 400. Todestag von Martin Chemnitz {The Second Martin of the Lutheran Church, Jubilee Writing for the 400th [anniversary of the day of the death] of Martin Chemnitz} edited by W.A. Jünke, Braunschweig, 1986.
- Studium Excitare: Biography of Martin Chemnitz by Joshua M. Zarling.
