= Mörlin =

Mörlin is a surname. Notable people with the surname include:

- Joachim Mörlin (1514-1571), German Lutheran theologian and Reformer
- Jodok Mörlin (1490-1550), German Lutheran theologian
- Maximilian Mörlin (1516-1584), German Lutherantheologian, court preacher, Superintendent in Coburg, and Reformer

== See also ==
- Morling (surname)
