= Landesbibliothek Coburg =

Library in Saxe-Coburg

Coordinates: 50°15′29″N 10°58′2″E

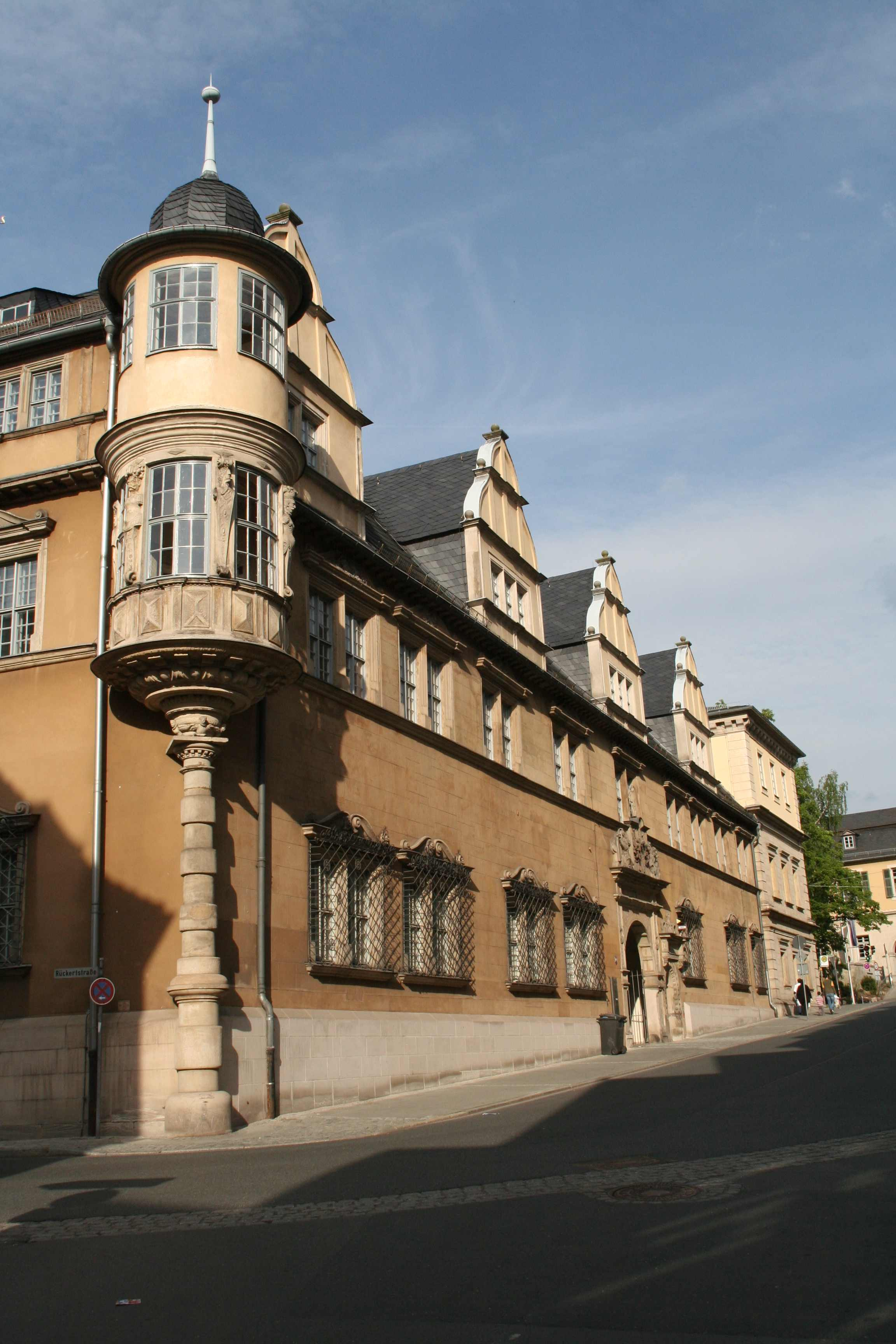
Landesbibliothek Coburg in Schloss Ehrenburg

The Landesbibliothek Coburg is a regional state (scientific) library under the administration of the Free State of Bavaria. It has its seat in the Ehrenburg Palace in Coburg and brings together the historical book collections of the dukes reigning in Coburg and their relatives.

== Library ==
The library has a stock of about 450,000 volumes of current and historical literature as well as 400 manuscripts, 151 incunables and about 6,500 autographs. The core collections include the former Court and State Library Saxe-Coburg with approximately 55,000 volumes, mainly from the 17th to 19th centuries, and the Ducal Private Library with 14,500 titles. But also the historical library of the Casimirianum Coburg with 15,000 titles in 7,500 volumes, mainly from the 16th to 18th century, and the Scheres library, built up by the former Coburg chancellor Johann Conrad von Scheres, called Zieritz (1641-1704), with legal literature of the 17th century, is to be included. The Luther Library and the Niederfüllbach Castle Library are also important. The Luther Collection was set up by Albert, Prince Consort in memory of Martin Luther's stay at Veste Coburg in 1530. It contains 850 volumes, mainly contemporary Luther prints and older secondary literature. The Niederfüllbach Castle Library was created by Leopold I of Belgium from the House of Saxe-Coburg-Saalfeld before his election as King of the Belgians in 1831. With just over 500 volumes, it is representative of the agriculture and forestry and modern estate management of the time.

== Situation ==
Large parts of Ehrenburg Palace are left to the library for use. The lending and reading rooms with an area of approximately 270 m² are located on the first floor in rooms of art-historical value, while exhibitions are held in the so-called Silver Hall. The storage rooms occupy several wings on different floors of the Palace. From 1968 to 1981, extensive renovation measures were carried out, including new reinforced concrete ceilings, at a cost of DM 4.5 million. With the move of the Coburg State Archives from the castle to the Zeughaus in 1990, the space problems in terms of storage capacity were temporarily solved.

== History ==
The Ehrenburg Palace, which was built by Duke Johann Ernst from 1542/43 onwards, has been home to books from the very beginning. In the course of the early modern period, parts of Ernestine book collections repeatedly reached Coburg in the course of various Ernestine inheritance divisions. Perhaps the most significant expansion took place between 1764 and 1799 during the reigns of the Dukes Ernst Friedrich and Franz Friedrich. The latter is also the founder of the Kupferstichkabinett der Kunstsammlungen der Veste Coburg.

Coburg was not affected by the secularisation at the beginning of the 19th century and the structure of the academic library system in Bavaria established at that time, as a State which was re-established in 1807 (like all Thuringian principalities) and remained sovereign until 1920. From 1801 to 1826, Friedrich Karl Forberg worked as a librarian in ducal services. From the early 19th century onwards, the former Ducal Court Library in Ehrenburg Palace was open to a limited public as a court and state library partly maintained from State funds. After the end of the monarchy and the establishment of the Free State of Coburg, the Coburger Landesstiftung took over the administration of the institution, which was first called Landesbücherei, then Landesbibliothek Coburg. The Coburg Landesstiftung had been founded in 1919 for the purpose of preserving the cultural assets of the lost state in legal independence. While maintaining its historical-traditional ties to Coburg, the library was transferred to the administration of the Free State of Bavaria from 1 January 1973. The partially unresolved ownership of the holdings of the Coburg State Library remained unaffected. In 1999, the former Directorate General of the Bavarian State Libraries was merged with the Bayerische Staatsbibliothek. Since then, the Landesbibliothek Coburg, like all regional state libraries in Bavaria, has been subordinated to it in the administrative structure.
