= Lukas Spielhausen =

Painting by Lucas Cranach the Elder

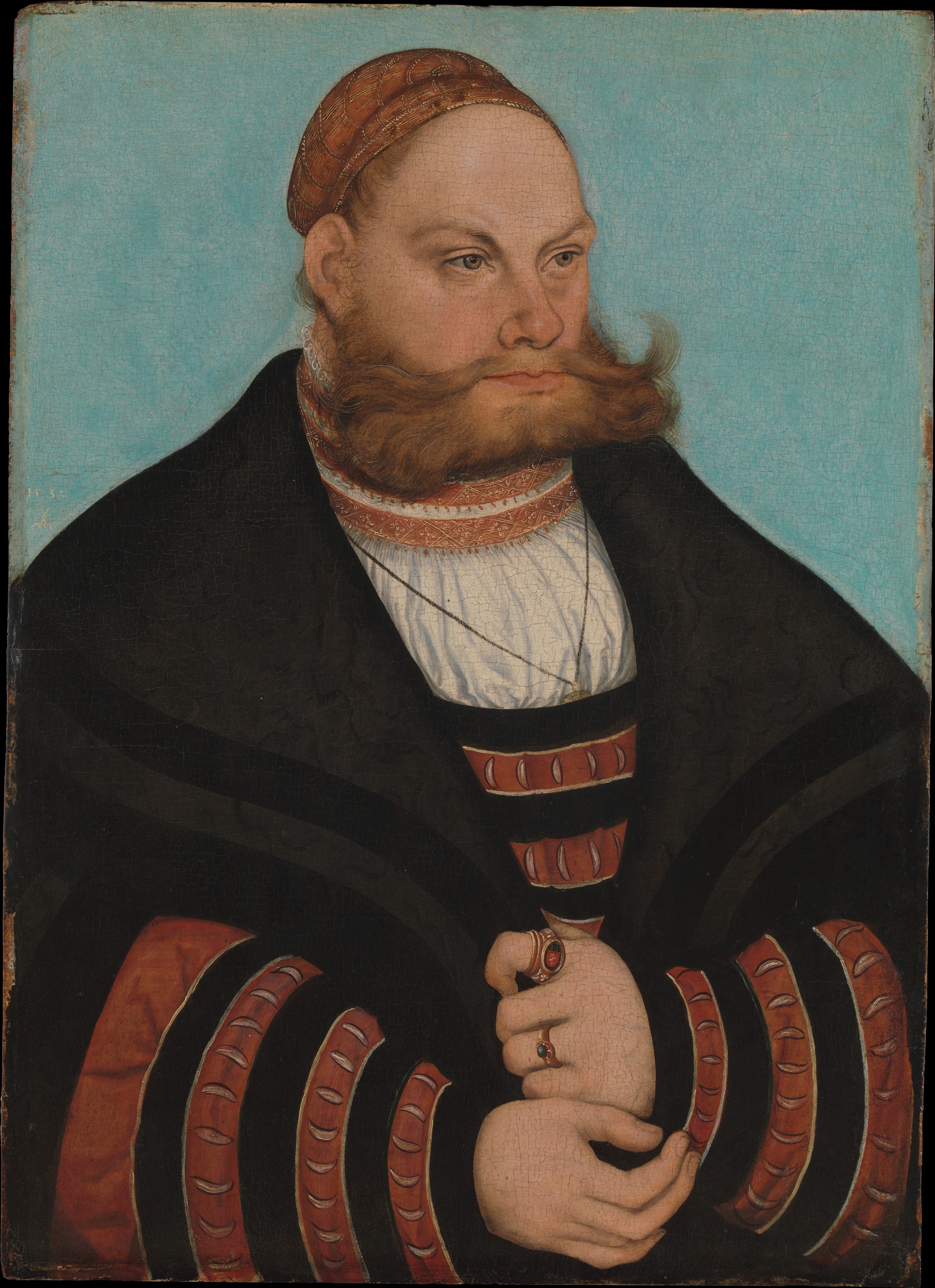
- Artist: Lucas Cranach the Elder
- Year: 1532
- Medium: Oil and gold on beech
- Subject: Lukas Spielhausen
- Dimensions: 50.8 cm × 36.5 cm (20.0 in × 14.4 in)
- Location: Metropolitan Museum of Art; New York
- Accession: 1981.57.1

Lukas Spielhausen is a 16th-century portrait by German artist Lucas Cranach the Elder. Done in oil and gold on beechwood, the painting is in the collection of the Metropolitan Museum of Art in New York.

The subject can be identified as Lukas Spielhausen from the black-and-yellow striped dress of a member of the electoral court of Saxony and the initials JS on his signet ring. Spielhausen was by 1531 a lawyer in the state judicial curia under Johann the Constant and was approximately thirty-nine years old when the sitting took place.

The work is on view in the Metropolitan Museum's Gallery 643.
