= Portrait of a Saxon Noblewoman =

Painting by Lucas Cranach the Elder

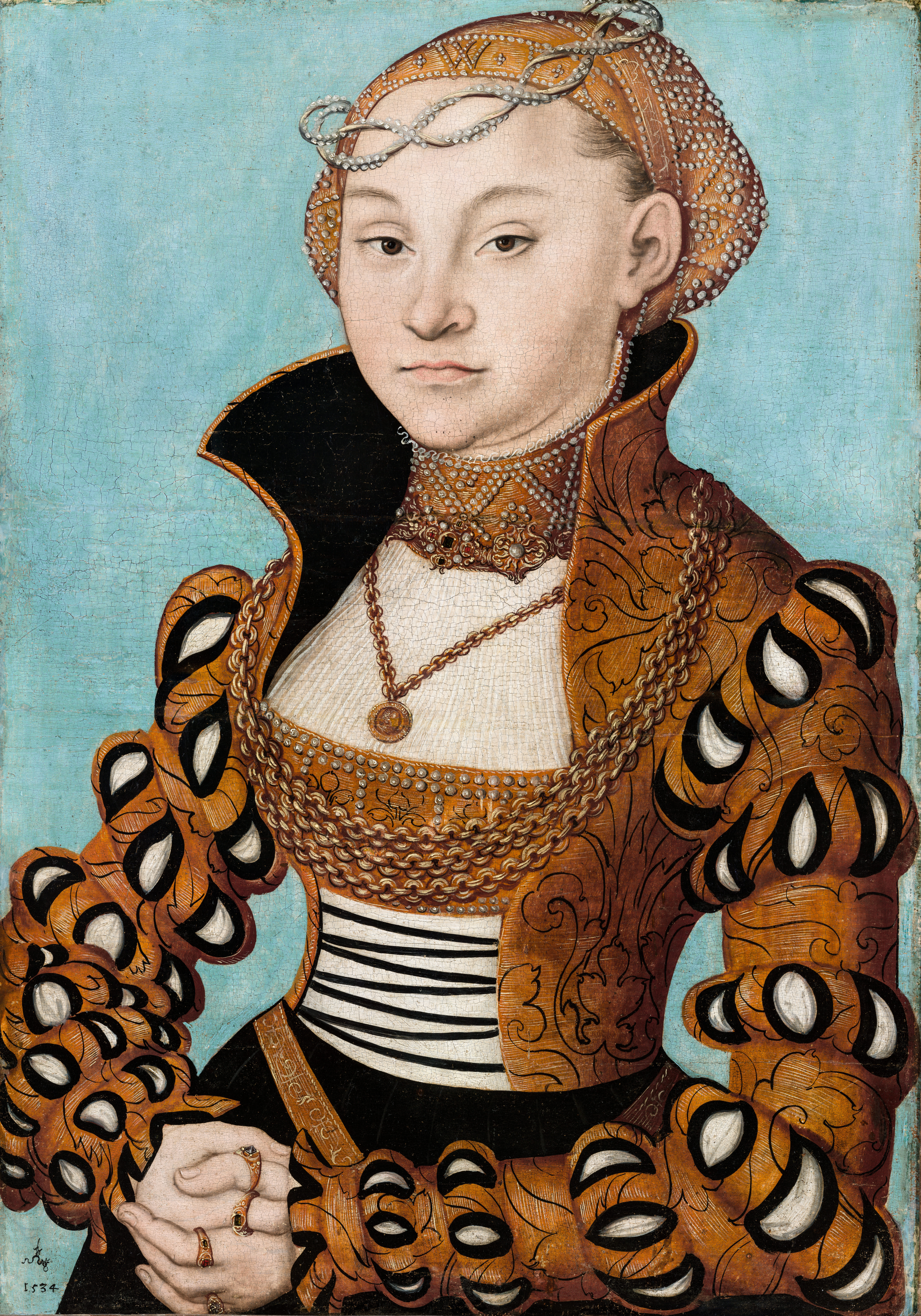
Portrait of a Saxon Noblewoman (1534) by Lucas Cranach the Elder

Portrait of a Saxon Noblewoman is an oil on canvas painting by Lucas Cranach the Elder. It has been in the Musée des Beaux-Arts de Lyon since 1892.

== Description ==
The painting shows a richly dressed woman posing to the painter; her precise identity remains unknown, although the abundance of jewelry seems to indicate that she is a married woman of high society. There is an enigmatic W in her hairstyle and the portrait of John Frederick I, Elector of Saxony is on her pendant. Particular care was given to the woman's clothing, which is particularly sophisticated. Her hair is covered, while she gazes in the direction of the viewer, hands clasped at her hips, and her bust is slightly tilted to the left. Like is often the case in Cranach's paintings, the chromatic scale is reduced, mainly summing up to black and orange, which offer color contrasts.
