= Morling =

Morling is a surname. Notable people with the surname include:

- George Morling (1891–1974), Australian Baptist minister
- Malena Mörling (born 1965), Swedish poet
- Edgar A. Morling (1864–1932), Justice of the Iowa Supreme Court

== See also ==
- Morling College, in Australia
- Mörlin (surname)
