= Jodok Mörlin =

Jodok Mörlin, also known in Latin as Jodocus Morlinus or Maurus (Note: The surname was also spelled in German before and during the Reformation as Morle, Mohr, Mörtle, Mörlein and Morlin. They all mean the same thing in German, “Little Moor”, in honor of St. Maurice the Moor. The coat-of-arms of Joachim Mörlin shows a Moor’s head.) ( ca 1490, Feldkirch, Archduchy of Austria, Holy Roman Empire — 15 September 1550, Westhausen bei Hildburghausen, Electorate of Saxony ), was a Professor of Philosophy at the University of Wittenberg, the Lutheran pastor of Westhausen bei Hildburghausen, and a Reformer. He is famed as one of the first witnesses, allies and participants of the Reformation and as the father of two Lutheran theologians, Joachim Mörlin and Maximilian Mörlin.

== Life ==
=== Before the Reformation ===
Jodok Mörlin was born in or around 1490 in Feldkirch in the Vorarlberg, (Note: Although he was with the Reformation from the beginning, Mörlin was not the first Reformer to have come out of Feldkirch. When he came to Wittenberg in 1510, there was already a group of Feldkirchers studying and teaching there. They were led by Bartholomäus Bernhardi ( 1487 – 1551 ). He had made the trip to Wittenberg in 1504 with fellow Feldkirchers, Johannes Dölsch and Christoph Metzler, the future Bishop of Constance.) the westernmost part of the Archduchy of Austria. He was the son of Hugo Mörlin ( 1446 – 1518 ) and his wife, Lucia Ebenko ( d. 1513 ), the grandson of Johann Mörlin, and the great-grandson of another Hugo Mörlin. The name, Jodok, was not Germanic; it was Breton. Jodok might have gotten his rare name if he was baptized on 13 December, the feast day of St. Judoc, a 7th Century noble from Brittany. (Note: See Günther Drosdowski, Duden Lexikon der Vornamen [ Duden Dictionary of Forenames ] ( Mannheim, Vienna and Zürich : Dudenverlag, 1974 ), page 123, for more details. The Saint had been venerated in Germany since the 19th Century. According to Duden Lexikon der Vornamen, his name is a Celtic word for “warrior”.)

Nothing is known about his early years. But in 1508 he was studying at the University of Freiburg im Breisgau, with Johann Eck as one of his teachers, and then, on a scholarship, at the University of Leipzig in 1509 and the University of Wittenberg in 1510. Here in Wittenberg his career was made. He graduated with a Bachelor's degree after only a few months in 1510 and a Magister's degree in 1512 and became the Professor of Metaphysics in 1514 and then the Dean of the Faculty of Arts in 1516, all at the University of Wittenberg. In 1517 and 1518, he taught an introductionary course about "the three principal languages, Latin, Hebrew and Greek, and the 'Luther College' grammar [ der dreier vornehmsten sprach, der lateinischen, jüdischen und kriechischen, und der Kollege Luther grammatica ]."

=== During the Reformation ===
Three years after the beginning of the Reformation, in the spring of 1521, Mörlin was appointed as the pastor of Westhausen. His post had been left vacant in 1520 with the death of the last Catholic priest, Henningus Gode. (Note: Also known as Henningus of Havelberg, Father Gode, a native of Werben (Elbe) in the Electorate of Brandenburg, joined the University of Wittenberg in 1511 as a Professor of Law. He had been the Rector and a Professor at the University of Erfurt, from which he graduated in 1489 with a Doctorate in jurisprudence.) By then, Mörlin was a presbyter at the Diocese of Magdeburg and already the Conventor [ parish administrator ] of Westhausen. He was recommended to replace Father Gode by Martin Luther and presented by two brothers, Frederick the Wise, the Elector of Saxony, and John the Steadfast, the Duke of Saxony, to the Prince-Bishop of Würzburg, Konrad von Thüngen. Mörlin was accepted and installed on 9 April 1521.

By then, Mörlin already had a wife and at least five sons, including Joachim and Maximilian, so he was, as Luther had noted in March 1521, "impotent and very poor [ unvermögend und sehr arm ]", in need of a better income. (Note: In early 1521, Luther wrote three letters, all in Latin, to Georg Spalatin in an attempt to improve Mörlin’s career and financial prospects. They were dated 29 January, 17 February and 19 March.) The appointment did improve his financial prospects because Westhausen was one of the several parishes assigned to the University of Wittenberg so that the professors would have steady income from them. But, as both the pastor and a resident, Mörlin still had to deliver his parish's annual fees to the University. He himself was not able to obtain his own exemption until 1528. So his financial problems continued, forcing his sons to learn their trades. Joachim was apprenticed as a potter, and Maximilian, as a tailor. Nevertheless, their father proved to be popular as a preacher. Residents came from all over the Heldburger Land to Westhausen to hear his sermons for years before they even got their own Lutheran pastors. This was precisely what the Elector and the Duke wanted, to limit the Catholic influence of the Prince-Bishops of Würzburg over the Heldburger Land.

In 1528, the Electorate of Saxony had its first Visitation of the East Country [ Ostland ] of Franconia. When the Visitors came to Westhausen, the parishioners told them that "he was doing all the hard work in the preaching of the Divine Word, and they had no lack of it, but they complained that he would be overcome with drink and pick fights [ er In predigung gotlichs worts allen vleis thue und hetten an Ime kein Mangel, allein wes er sich den trunk überwindten und betryegen Iyeß ]". Mörlin, threatened with dismissal, promised to improve. In the following Visitations, he kept his word, and he was allowed to keep his offices. But he still had to keep a chaplain and pay him an annual salary of 40 guilders.

=== After the Reformation ===
Mörlin died in Westhausen on 15 September 1550 after 29 years as the town's pastor.

== Family ==
Jodocus was married twice. His first wife was Margarete, the daughter of the administrator of the Elector of Saxony's vineyards, and she died in either 1514 or 1515. Mörlin then married Anna Hausknecht, perhaps a native of Wittenberg, in 1515 and they had 12 children, including two of their eight sons, Joachim and Maximilian.

== Bibliography ==
- (in German) Reinhold Albert, "Magister Jodocus Mörlin und die Reformation im Heldburger Land [ Magister Jodocus Morlin and the Reformation in the Heldburger Land ]", Heimatkalender für Franken und Thüringen, Band 2002 [ Local Almanac of Franconia and Thuringia, Volume 2002 ] ( Coburg : Verlag Fränkischer Heimatkalender [ Franconian Almanac Publications ], 2001 ), pages 68 – 70
- (in German) Anonymous, "Feldkircher Reformatoren [ Feldkirch Reformers ]", posted 10 July 2011, Vorarlberg Reader, accessed 25 January 2015
- (in German) Otto Clemen, "Briefe von Jodokus Mörlin, Pfarrer zu Westhausen [ Letters of Jodocus Mörlin, Pastor of Westhausen ]", in : Coburger Monatsblätter, Beiträge zur Geschichte, Kultur und Wirtschaft zwischen Rennsteig und Main [ Coburger Monthly : Contributions to the History, Culture and Economy Between Rennsteig and Main ], April 1954, pages 220 – 224
- (in German) Wilhelm Fox, Drei Vorarlberger Professoren zu Wittenberg : mit einem Anhang [ Three Vorarlberger Professors at Wittenberg : with an Appendix ], Veröffentlichungen des Vereines für Christliche Kunst und Wissenschaft in Vorarlberg und im Westallgäu, Band 4 [ Publications of the Society for Christian Arts and Sciences in Vorarlberg and the Western Allgäu, Volume 4 ] ( Feldkirch, Austria : Verein für Christliche Kunst und Wissenschaft für Vorarlberg und das Westallgäu, 1911 )
- (in German) Andreas Gruner, "Meine Mörlin-Vorfahren [ My Mörlin Ancestors ]", Erfolg und Glück - es gibt viel mehr für uns, als etwas weniger Elend! [ Success and Happiness — There's a Lot More for Us, and Little Less Misery! ], accessed 25 January 2015
- (in German) Ingo Krauß, "Die Mörlin : Ein familiengeschichtlicher Beitrag [ The Mörlins : A Genealogical Post ]", Familiengeschichtlichen Blättern [ Genealogical Scrolls ], Volume 26, Number 6 ( 1928 ), page 158
