= Ehrenburg Palace =

- Schloss Ehrenburg
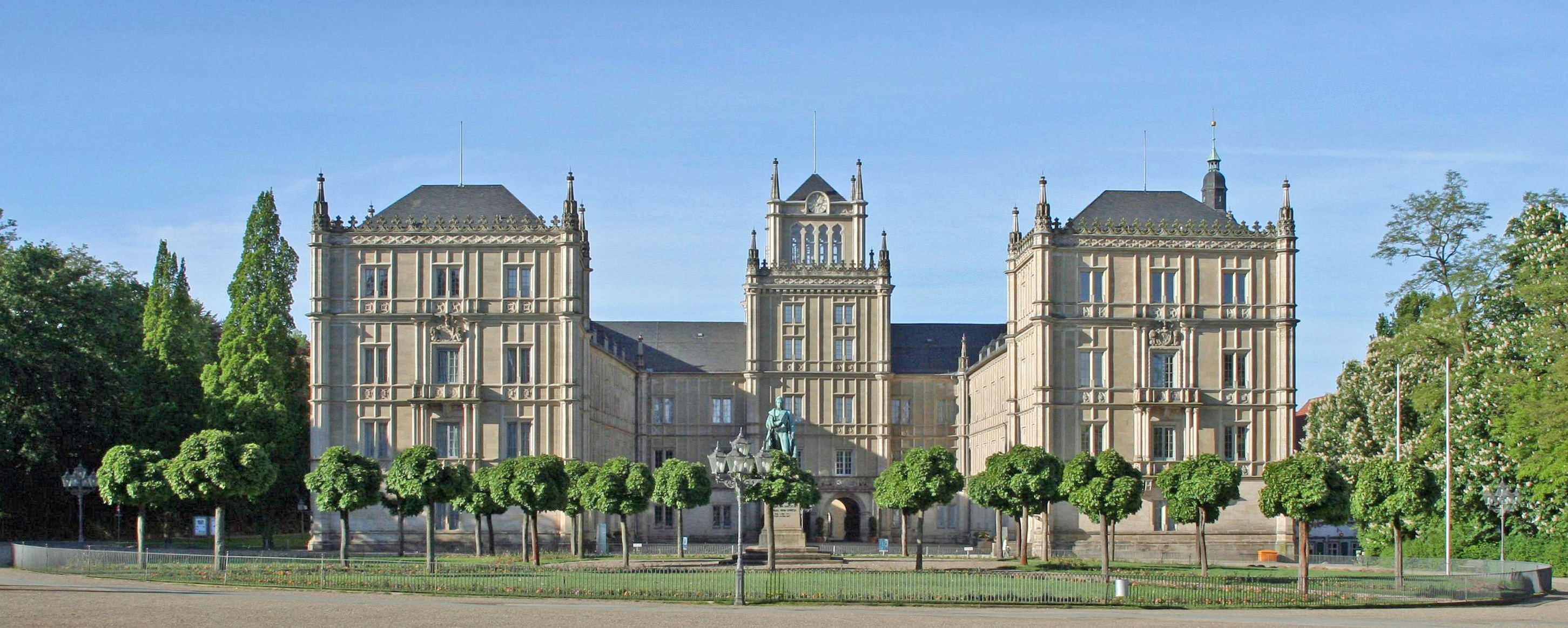
- Ehrenburg Palace

- Location within Bavaria Location within Germany

General information
- Type: Palace
- Architectural style: Gothic Revival style
- Location: Coburg, Germany
- Coordinates: 50.258056°N 10.967222°E
- Construction started: 1543
- Completed: 1547
- Renovated: 1699, 19th century
- Client: Johann Ernst, Herzog von Sachsen-Coburg
- Owner: Bayerische Verwaltung der staatlichen Schlösser, Gärten und Seen

Design and construction
- Architect: Karl Friedrich Schinkel (19th century redesign)

Ehrenburg Palace (German: Schloss Ehrenburg) is a palace in Coburg, Franconia, Germany. It served as the main Coburg residence for the ruling princes from the 1540s until 1918. The palace's exterior today mostly reflects Gothic Revival style.

== History ==
The palace was built by Johann Ernst, Duke of Saxe-Coburg, in 1543–7. It replaced the Veste Coburg as the dukes' town Residenz. The new town palace was built around a Franciscan monastery dissolved during Reformation. According to tradition, the palace was named Ehrenburg ("Palace of Honour") by Emperor Charles V for having been constructed without the use of forced labour.

Under Duke Johann Casimir the first major rebuilding took place. Around 1590 the (still extant) south wing was constructed by the Renaissance architect Michael Frey.

In 1690, a fire destroyed the northern part of the palace. This was an opportunity for Albert V, Duke of Saxe-Coburg, who had a new Baroque style palace built in 1699. The construction of a new chapel in the west wing, the east wing and the central part of the building gave the Ehrenburg the basic structure it retains today.

In the 19th century, Ernst I had the palace redesigned by Karl Friedrich Schinkel in English Gothic Revival style, beginning in 1810. Most of the work took place between 1816 and 1840, with the palace façade clothed in sandstone.

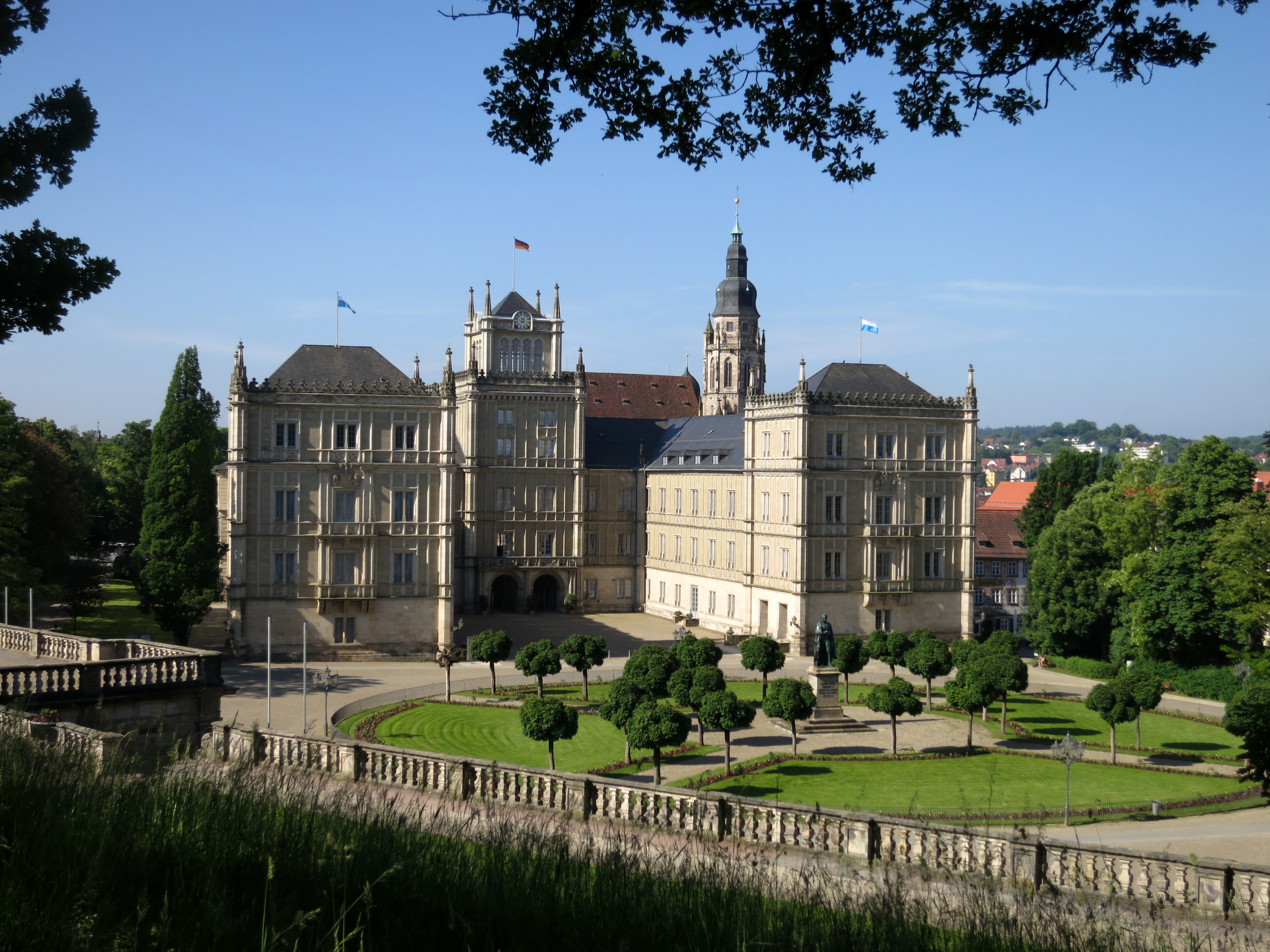
Ehrenburg Palace, 2013

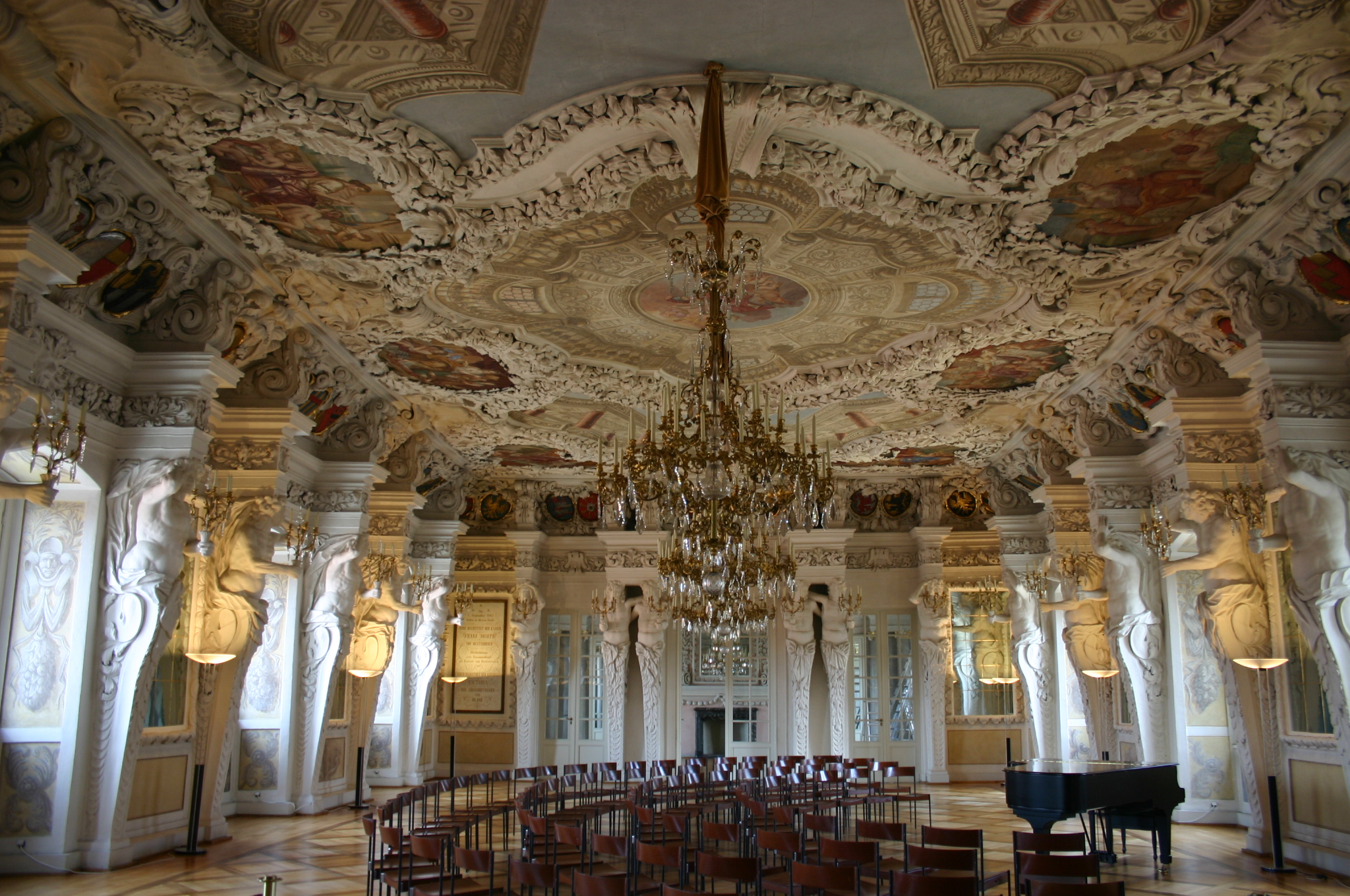
Hall of Giants

Also between 1816 and 1840 the state apartments were redesigned in the French Empire style.

Because the palace was the home of the ducal House of Saxe-Coburg and Gotha (previously Saxe-Coburg-Saalfeld), many royal occasions happened here.

In 1863, Queen Victoria (whose mother, Princess Victoria, and husband, Prince Albert, grew up here) met Austrian Emperor Franz Josef for the first time in the Hall of Giants (a sign marks the occasion).

In 1894, the wedding of Ernest Louis, Grand Duke of Hesse and Princess Victoria Melita of Saxe-Coburg and Gotha brought together, at the palace, Queen Victoria, her son the future King Edward VII, her grandson the future King George V, her daughter German Empress Victoria, her other grandson Kaiser Wilhelm II, her son's nephew the future Tsar Nicholas II of Russia (with her granddaughter, future Tsarina Alexandra), and many other royalty from England, Greece, Belgium, Romania, Portugal, Brazil and elsewhere.

== Today ==
The palace is used as a museum today. Among other exhibits, it features art galleries with works by Lucas Cranach the Elder, Dutch and Flemish artists of the 16th and 17th centuries as well as Romantic landscape paintings.
