= Hans Buser =

Freiherr of Liestal (1536–1544)

Hans von Buus

Freiherr of Liestal
- Reign: 1536 – 1544
- Predecessor: Hans Buser
- Successor: Hans Buser III "Der Canis"
- Born: 23 September 1513; Läufelfingen, Prince-Bishopric of Basel, Holy Roman Empire
- Died: 19 August 1544 (aged 31); Liestal, Prince-Bishopric of Basel, Holy Roman Empire
- Burial: Buus, Switzerland
- Spouse: Margarete von Sachsen (1518–1545).
- Issue: Hans Buser "Der Canis"
- Religion: Catholicism

Hans Buser (23 September 1513 – 19 August 1544), also known as Hans von Buus, was Freiherr of the Amt of Liestal from 1536 until his death in 1544.

== Biography ==
Born in Läufelfingen, he was the first born son to Lord Hans Buser I. He had at least one brother, Oswald, and an unknown number of sisters. He was just 23 years old when his father died and he inherited his lands.

His humble ancestors hailing from the small, local village of Buus in the Amt of Liestal, the young and ambitious Lord Buser sought to increase his family's wealth and influence in both the Prince-Bishopric of Basel and the Holy Roman Empire as a whole. Using his political pull with the Prince-Bishop, he arranged a marriage to the last daughter of Johann von Sachsen, Margaret. By this connection to the royal family of the Empire, the marriage significantly increased his family's authority in the region and greater respect among the noble houses.

He died at the age of 31 after falling ill to a fever. He had at least one son, Hans Buser III (1538–1584), who came to be known as "der Canis" for his bravery and death in the Cologne War in 1584. In addition, he had two other sons, named Mathis and Martin Buser. The Buser family was eventually displaced from Liestal during the Thirty Years' War, and Hans' great-grandson, Georg, moved the family to his maternal homeland in Saxony under the name of Bausser. Most of the family remained there, while others emigrated to Philadelphia in the early 1700s under Matthias Bowser. The town of Addison in Somerset County was mostly home to the Bausser family (which eventually was changed to Bowser), while others moved to Accident, Maryland.
