= Margaret of Anhalt-Köthen =

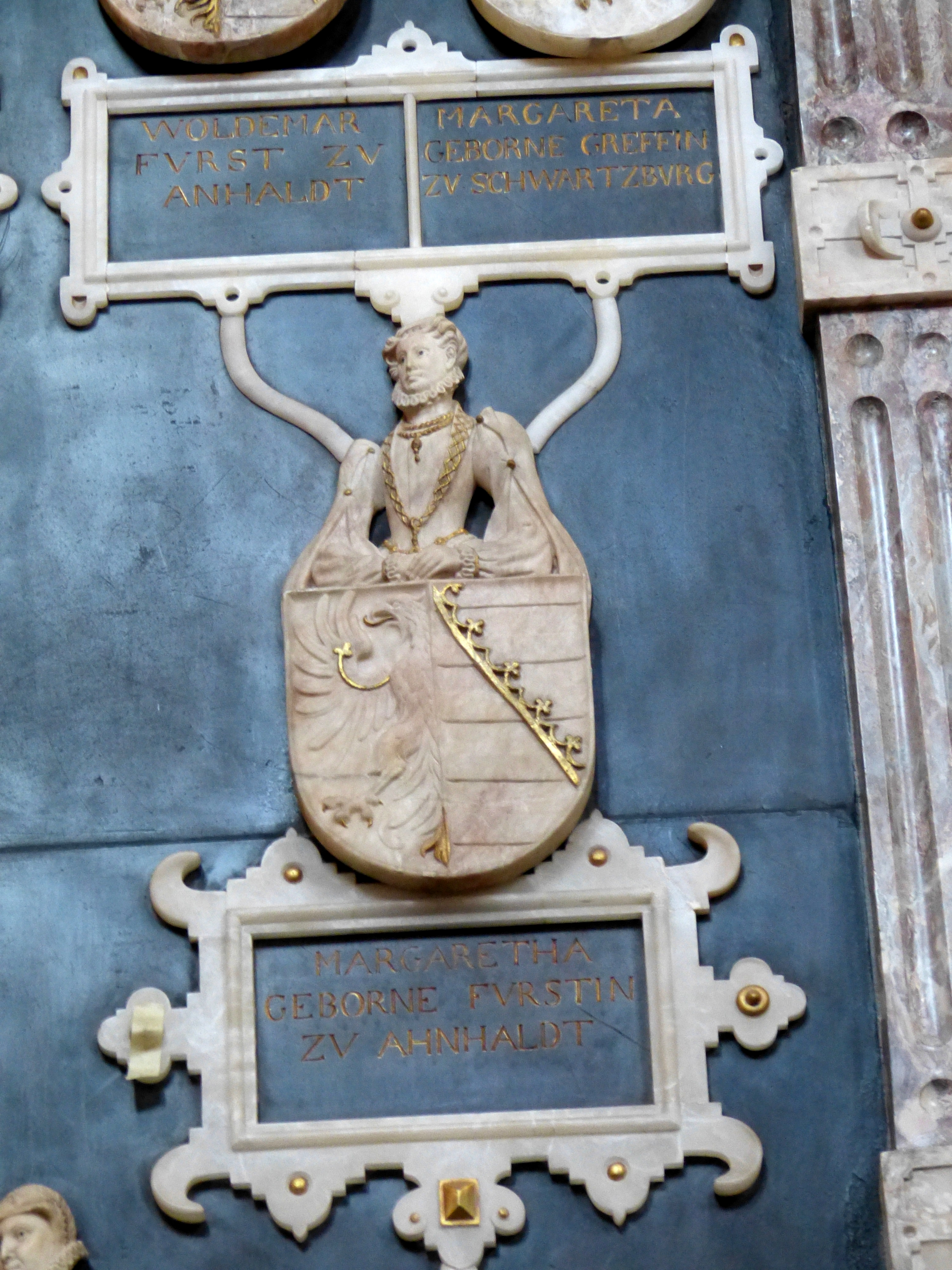
- Born: 12 November 1494; Köthen
- Died: 7 October 1521 (aged 26); Weimar
- Noble family: House of Ascania
- Spouse: John, Elector of Saxony
- Issue Detail: Maria of Saxony, Duchess of Pomerania; John Ernest, Duke of Saxe-Coburg
- Father: Waldemar VI, Prince of Anhalt-Köthen
- Mother: Margaret of Schwarzburg-Blankenburg

Margaret of Anhalt (12 November 1494, Köthen – 7 October 1521, Weimar) was a member of the House of Ascania and was a princess of Anhalt by birth and by marriage Duchess of Saxony.

== Life ==
Margaret was a daughter of Prince Waldemar VI from his marriage to Countess Margaret of Schwarzburg-Blankenburg (1464–1539), a daughter of Count Günther XXXVI of Schwarzburg-Blankenburg.

On 13 November 1513 she married the later Elector John the Steadfast of Saxony (1468–1532) in Torgau. She was his second wife. His brother Frederick III was unhappy about John marrying Margaret, because she was from a relatively minor princely family. For Frederick, this was his reason to their joint rule and divide the country. Margaret's brother, Wolfgang, was the second prince in the Empire, after Frederick III, who converted to Lutheranism. The poet Philip Engelbrecht dedicated an epithalamium to John and Margaret in 1514. John was devoted his wife and loved her dearly.

Margaret died in 1521 in her residence in Weimar, four years before her husband became Elector of Saxony. She was buried in the City Church of St. Peter und Paul in Weimar.

== Issue ==
From her marriage, Margaret and John had the following children:

1. Maria (b. Weimar, 15 December 1515 – d. Wolgast, 7 January 1583), married on 27 February 1536 to Duke Philip I of Pomerania-Wolgast.
2. Margaret (b. Zwickau, 25 April 1518 – d. Liestal 10 March 1545).
3. John (b. and d. Weimar, 26 September 1519).
4. John Ernest, Duke of Saxe-Coburg (b. Coburg, 10 May 1521 – d. Coburg, 8 February 1553).
