= Maximilian Mörlin =

German theologian (1516–1584)

Maximilian Mörlin ( 14 October 1516, Wittenberg, Electorate of Saxony — 20 April 1584, Coburg, Duchy of Saxe-Coburg-Eisenach ) was a Lutheran theologian, court preacher, Superintendent in Coburg, and Reformer.

== Life ==
Maximilian grew up with his older brother, Joachim Mörlin, as the sons of Jodok Mörlin ( Jodocus Morlinus, ca. 1490 – 1550 ), the Professor of Philosophy at the University of Wittenberg. After a harsh upbringing, when he learned the trade of a tailor, he switched to the profession of a scholar. Like his brother, he studied at Wittenberg in 1533 and came under the influence of Martin Luther and especially Philipp Melanchthon. From 1539, he was the pastor in Pegau and Zeitz and, after 1543, in Schalkau. On the recommendation of his teacher, he came to Coburg in 1544 as a court preacher ( Hofprediger ) and visited the city’s churches and schools on the behalf of the Duke of Saxony.

After Maximilian graduated in 1546 under Caspar Cruciger the Elder at Wittenberg to the rank of Doctor, he was appointed as a Superintendent. In the theological debates of the times, he was at first on the side of Matthias Flacius. He pursued the condemnation of Justus Menius, participated in the Colloquy of Worms in 1557 and wrote with and Johann Stössel the Weimarer Konfutationsbuch [ the Weimarer Book of Refutations ], which was mandatory for the Lutheran churches throughout Thuringia. The Duke of Saxony, John Frederick the Middle, also took him to Heidelberg to prevent his father-in-law, Frederick III the Pious, the Elector Palatinate of the Rhine, from going over to the Reformed side. The Heidelberger Abendmahlsgespräch [ Heidelberger Discussion of the Lord’s Supper ], with which Mörlin was involved on 3 and 4 July 1560, remained unsuccessful.

However, from the side of the Radicals, Flacius struck, distancing Mörlin from the Philippists. He fought against Andreas Osiander and helped in 1556 to enforce the Reformation to the Margraviate of Baden-Durlach on the behalf of its ruler, Charles II. As the Spiritual Assessor for the Consistory of Weimar, he pleaded in 1561 for peace with the terms of the mediating theologian Melanchthon. In Jena, he served in 1564 as the Pro-Chancellor and Vice-Dean in the first program for theological doctorates and upgraded Stössel’s academic degree from Magister to Doctor.

The next Duke of Saxony, John William, himself the supporter of Flacius, expelled Mörlin from the Duchy in 1569. A year later, Mörlin was appointed to Dillenburg and later Siegen, where he represented his side against the Reformed tendencies of the ruler, the Count of Nassau-Dillenburg, John VI, but without success. In 1573, he returned from Siegen to Coburg, where he was restored to his old offices. He dismissed the Gnesio-Lutherans and used his influence to add to the Formula Concordiae [ Formula of Concord ] and to contend with its effects.

Mörlin gained importance as a preacher and the representative of church administrators.

In 1581, he married for the second time. He was survived by twelve sons.

== Literature ==
- (in English) John McClintock and James Strong, “Mörlin, Maximilian”, in : Cyclopædia of Biblical, Theological, and Ecclesiastical Literature, Volume VI. – ME – NEV. ( New York City : Harper & Brothers, 1894 ), pages 617 and 618
- (in English) Samuel Macauley Jackson, editor, “Moerlin, Maximilian”, in : The New Schaff-Herzog Encyclopedia of Religious Knowledge, Volume VII : Liutfrand – Moralities ( New York City and London : Funk and Wagnalls Company, 1910 ), page 434.
- (in German) Julius August Wagenmann, “Mörlin, Maximilian”, in : Allgemeine Deutsche Biographie ( ADB ) [ General German Biography ], Band 22 [ Volume 22 ] ( Leipzig : Duncker & Humblot, 1885 ), page 325.
- (in German) Friedrich [ Eduard ] Lezius ( as Karl Färber ) : “Mörlin, Maximilian”, in : Realencyklopädie für protestantische Theologie und Kirche ( RE ) [ Real Encyclopedia of Protestant Theology and Church ], 3. Auflage, Dreizehtner Band : Methodismus in Amerika bis Neuplatonismus [ 3rd Edition, Thirteenth Volume : Methodism in America to Neo-Platonism ] ( Leipzig : J. C. Hinrichs, 1903 ), pages 247 – 249.
- (in German) Wolfgang Hamm, editor, Wittenberger Gelehrtenstammbuch [ Pedigrees of the Wittenberger Scholars ], produced by the Deutsches Historisches Museum [ Museum of German History ] of Berlin in cooperation with the Mitteldeutschen Verlag ( Halle : Mitteldeutschen Verlag, 1999 ), ISBN 3-932776-76-3, page 327
- (in German) August Beck, Johann Friedrich der Mittlere von Sachsen [ John Friedrich the Middle of Saxony ], Volumes 1 and 2 ( Weimar : Hermann Böhlau, 1858 )
- (in German) Albert Greiner, “Das Leben und Wirken des Doktors der Theologie Maximilian Mörlin ( Superintendent zu Coburg ) [ The Life and Work of the Doctor of Theology Maxmilian Mörlin ( Superintendent of Coburg ) ]”, in : Aus der Heimat ( des Coburger Landes ) [ From the Homeland of the Coburger Land ], 1936
