= John Frederick I of Saxony =

Elector of Saxony from 1532 to 1547

John Frederick I
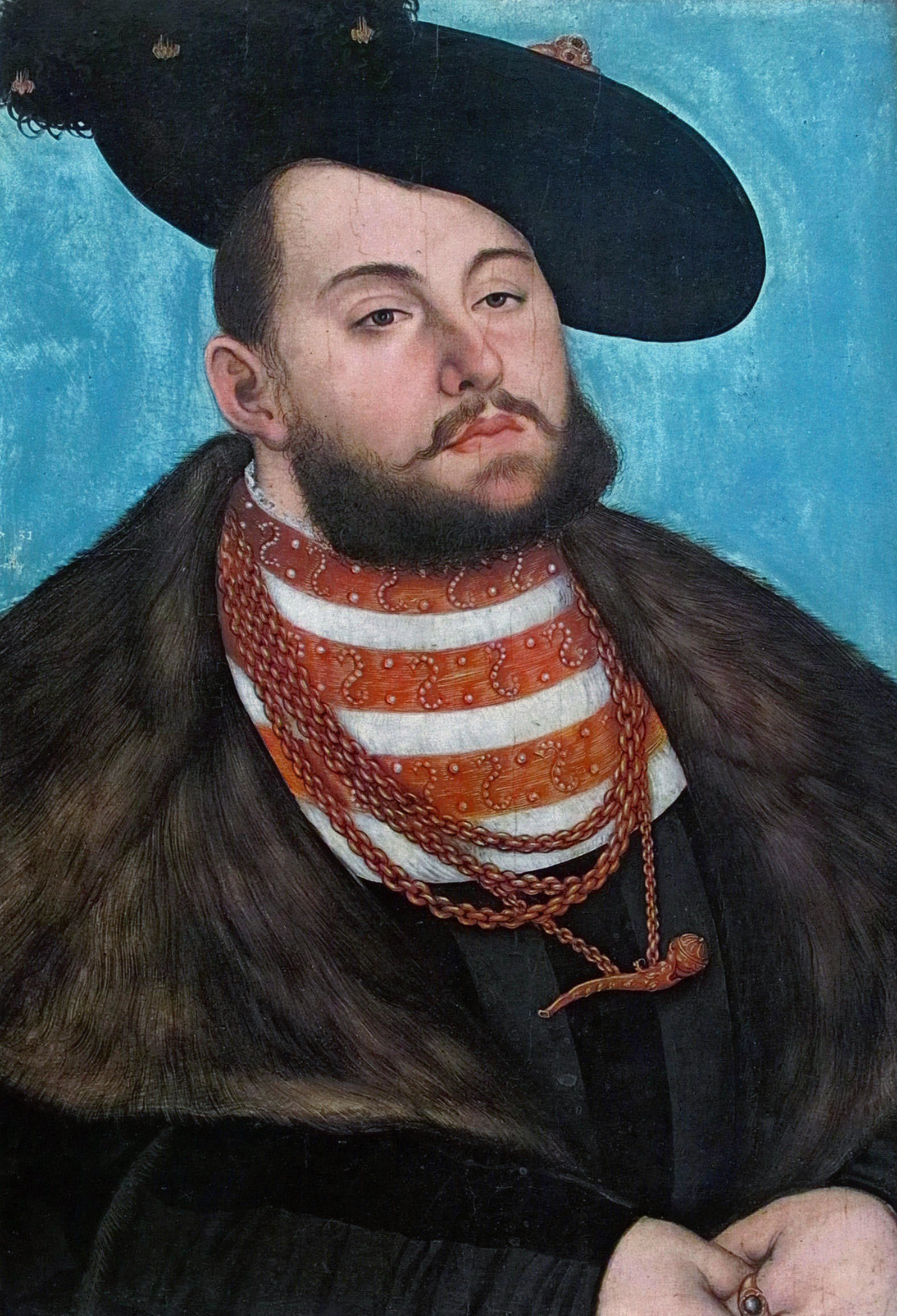
- Portrait by Lucas Cranach the Elder, 1531

Elector of Saxony
- Reign: 16 August 1532 – 24 April 1547
- Predecessor: John
- Successor: Maurice

Duke of Saxony
- Reign: 24 April 1547 – 3 March 1554
- Predecessor: Maurice
- Successor: John Frederick II

Landgrave of Thuringia
- Reign: 16 August 1532 – 24 April 1547
- Predecessor: John
- Successor: John Ernest
- Born: 30 June 1503; Torgau, Electorate of Saxony, Holy Roman Empire
- Died: 3 March 1554 (aged 50); Weimar, Electorate of Saxony, Holy Roman Empire
- Burial: St. Peter und Paul, Weimar
- Spouse: Sybille of Cleves
- Issue: John Frederick II, Duke of Saxony; John William, Duke of Saxe-Weimar; John Frederick III, Duke of Saxe-Gotha
- House: Wettin (Ernestine line)
- Father: John, Elector of Saxony
- Mother: Sophie of Mecklenburg-Schwerin
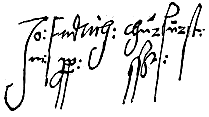
- Signature

John Frederick I (German: Johann Friedrich I. von Sachsen; called the Magnanimous der Großmütige; 30 June 1503 – 3 March 1554) was the Prince-Elector and Arch-Marshal of the Holy Roman Empire (1532–1547) from the Ernestine branch of the Saxon ruling House of Wettin, who initially governed over the Ernestine Electorate of Saxony, centred on Saxe-Wittenberg, until he was deprived of his electoral titles and most domains by the Capitulation of Wittenberg (1547). He was left with the Saxon ducal title, and Ernestine possessions in Thuringia. Previously, he was leading the Schmalkaldic League, a military alliance of Lutheran principalities.

== Early years ==
John Frederick was the eldest son of John, Elector of Saxony by his first wife, Sophie of Mecklenburg-Schwerin. His mother died fourteen days after his birth, on 12 July 1503.

John Frederick received his education from George Spalatin, whom he highly esteemed during his whole life. Spalatin was Martin Luther's friend and advisor and thus, through Spalatin's schooling, John Frederick developed a devotion to the teachings of Luther. His knowledge of history was comprehensive, and his library, which extended over all sciences, was one of the largest in Germany.

He cultivated a personal relationship with Luther, beginning to correspond with him in the days when the bull of excommunication was first issued against the Reformer, and showing himself a convinced adherent of Luther. He carefully observed the development of the reformatory movement. He read Luther's writings, urged the printing of the first complete (Wittenberg) edition of his works, and in the latter years of his life promoted the compilation of the Jena edition. At the Elector's Schloss Hartenfels at Torgau, he constructed a chapel specifically designed to be a Lutheran place of worship and invited Martin Luther to deliver the inaugural sermon. The influence of Lutheranism at John Frederick's court is also visible in the translation by Veit Warbeck of the French romance the Magelone, made in preparation of John Frederick's marriage in 1527; Catholic elements are suppressed.

His father introduced him into the political and diplomatic affairs of the time, and he conducted the first negotiations of a treaty with Hesse in Kreuzburg and Friedewald. He took an active part in the disturbances caused by the Pack affair (see John the Steadfast), and Luther was grateful to him for his exertions, in spite of his youth, for the maintenance of peace.

During the second diet of Speyer (1529) he temporarily assumed the reins of government in place of his father. The intrigues of Archduke Ferdinand induced him after the diet to draw up an imperial statute for the Evangelical estates, which shows that he was more decidedly convinced of the right and duty of defense than his father. He accompanied the latter to the Diet of Augsburg in 1530, signed with him the Augsburg Confession and was active in the proceedings. His attitude did not remain unnoticed, and won him the dislike of Emperor Charles V.

== Elector of Saxony ==
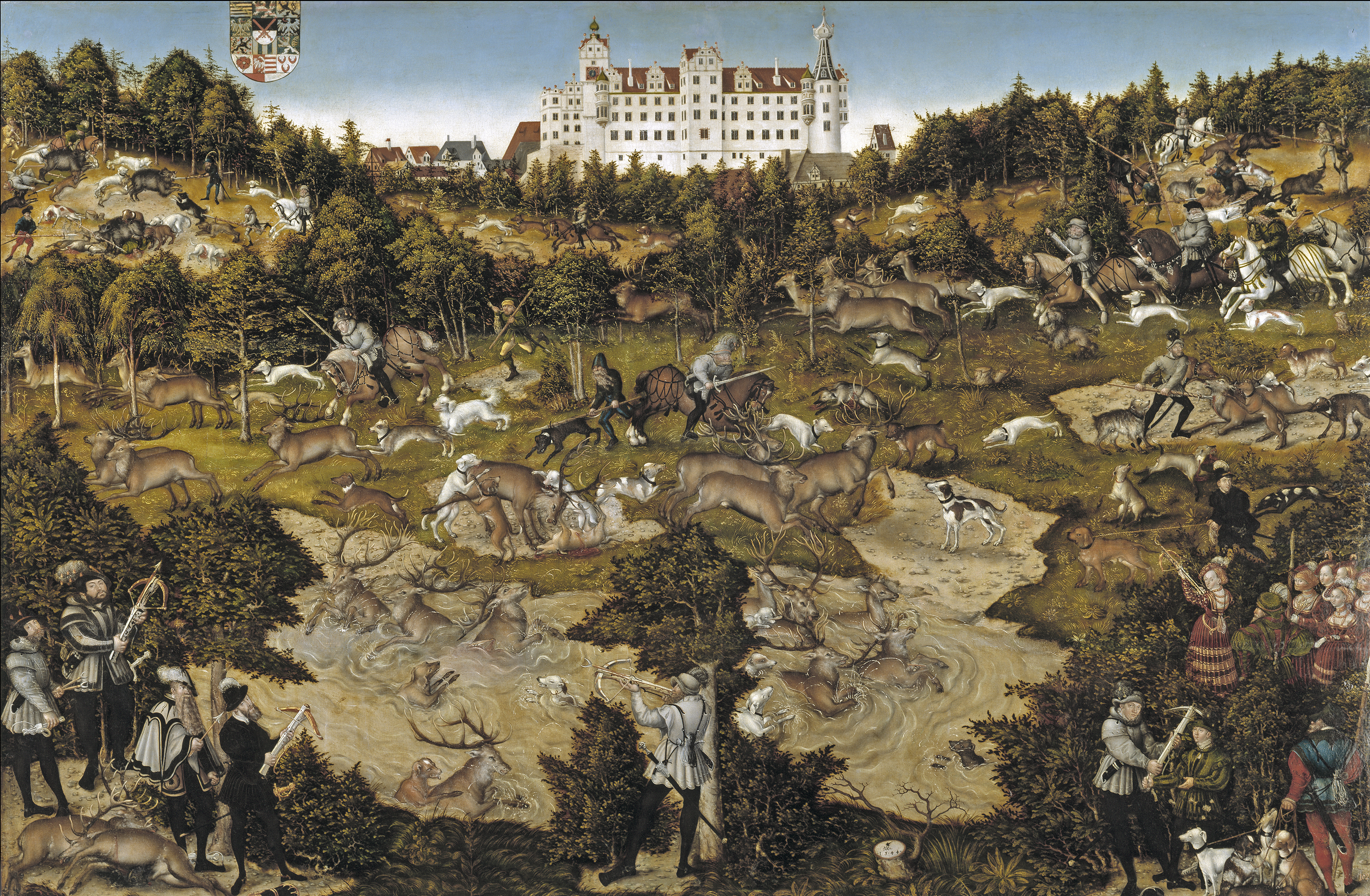
Hunt in Honour of Charles V at the Castle of Torgau, by Lucas Cranach the Younger, 1544

In 1532, John Frederick succeeded his father as elector. In the beginning he reigned with his half-brother, John Ernest, but in 1542 became sole ruler.

Chancellor Gregor Brück, who for years had guided the foreign relations of the country with ability and prudence, remained also his councilor, but his open and impulsive nature often led him to disregard the propositions of his more experienced adviser, so that the country was in frequent danger, especially as John Frederick was not a far-sighted politician.

He consolidated the Lutheran State Church by the institution of an electoral consistory (1542) and renewed the church visitation. He took a firmer and more decided stand than his father in favor of the Schmalkaldic League, but on account of his strictly Lutheran convictions was involved in difficulties with Philip I, Landgrave of Hesse, who favored a union with the Swiss and Strasburg Evangelicals. He was averse to all propositions of Popes Clement VII and Paul III to support calling a General Council, because he was convinced that it would only serve "for the preservation of the papal and anti-Christian rule"; but to be prepared for any event, he requested Luther to summarize all articles to which he would adhere before a council, and Luther wrote the Schmalkald Articles. At the Diet of Schmalkalden in 1537 the council was refused, and the elector treated the papal legate with open disregard and rejected the propositions of Matthias von Held, the imperial legate.

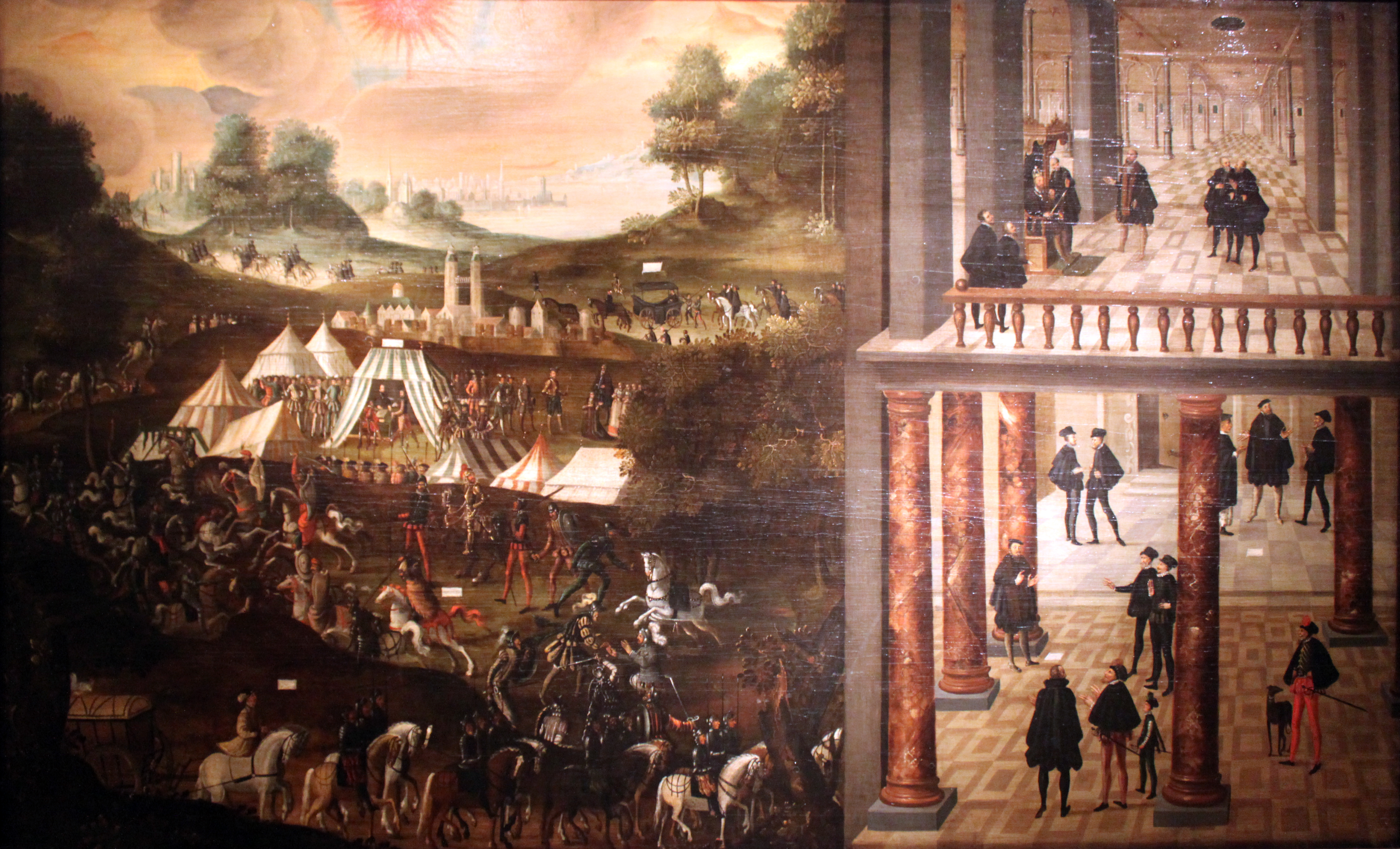
Battle of Mühlberg 1547 and imprisonment of Elector John Frederick I of Saxony. Painting from 1630, German Historical Museum, Berlin

He followed the efforts at agreement at the conference of Regensburg in 1541 with suspicion and refused to accept the article on justification which had been drawn up under the supervision of Gasparo Contarini to suit both parties, and Luther, his steady adviser, confirmed him in his aversion. The efforts at agreement failed, and the elector contributed not a little to broaden the gulf by his interference in the ecclesiastical affairs of Halle and by aiding the Reformation which had been introduced there by Justus Jonas. His attitude became more and more stubborn and regardless of consequences, not to the advantage of the Protestant cause.

In spite of the warnings of the emperor, of Brück, and of Luther, he arbitrarily set aside in 1541 the election of Julius von Pflug as the bishop of Naumburg, and instead instituted Nicolaus von Amsdorf as bishop, and introduced the Reformation. In 1542 he expelled Duke Henry V of Brunswick-Wolfenbüttel from his country to protect the Evangelical cities Goslar and Brunswick and introduced the Reformation there. Entanglement in other wars hindered Emperor Charles V from interfering and by apparently yielding he succeeded in concealing his true intentions. The elector appeared personally at the diet of Speyer in 1544. The harmony of the emperor with the Evangelicals appeared never greater than at that time. He permitted the Regensburg declaration of 1541 to be embodied in the new recess and acknowledged all innovations which the Evangelicals had made between 1532 and 1541 because he needed the aid of the Protestants against France. John Frederick actually thought that peace had come and continued the ecclesiastical reforms in his country. Even the growing discord among the allies did not disturb him.

When the Schmalkaldic War broke out in 1546, he marched to the south at the head of his troops, but the unexpected invasion of his country by his cousin Duke Maurice compelled him to return. He succeeded in reconquering the larger part of his possessions and repelling Maurice, but suddenly the emperor hastened north and surprised the elector. The Battle of Mühlberg, 24 April 1547, went against him and dispersed his army. He received a slashing wound to the left side of his face, leaving him with a disfiguring scar from his lower eye socket down his cheek. He was taken prisoner by Charles V and sent into exile in Worms.

== Prisoner ==
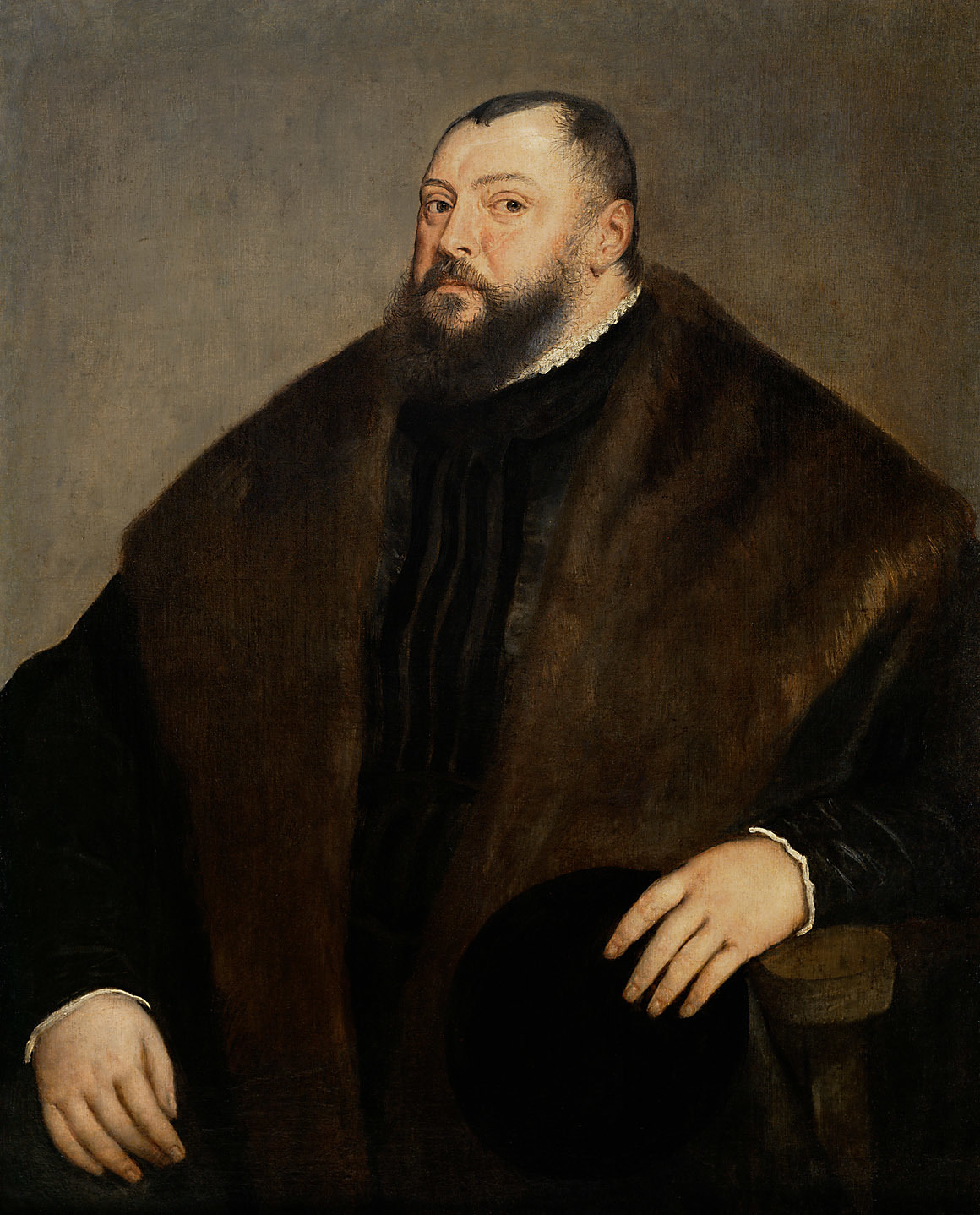
John Frederick in captivity, painted by Titian c. 1550–51. Note the scar on the left of his face, received at Mühlberg.

Emperor Charles V condemned John Frederick to death as a convicted rebel; but, not to lose time in the siege of Wittenberg, which was defended by John Frederick's wife, Sybille, he did not execute the sentence and entered into negotiations, focused on the electoral titles and domains. Since the Treaty of Leipzig (1485), the House of Wettin was divided in two dynastic branches, the senior Ernestines who held the princely electoral dignity, and the junior Albertines who ruled as dukes. To save his life, protect his wife and sons, and avert further hostilities, John Frederick conceded the Capitulation of Wittenberg, and, after having been compelled to resign the electoral titles and domains (Duchy of Saxe-Wittenberg) in favor of Maurice, his condemnation was commuted to life imprisonment.

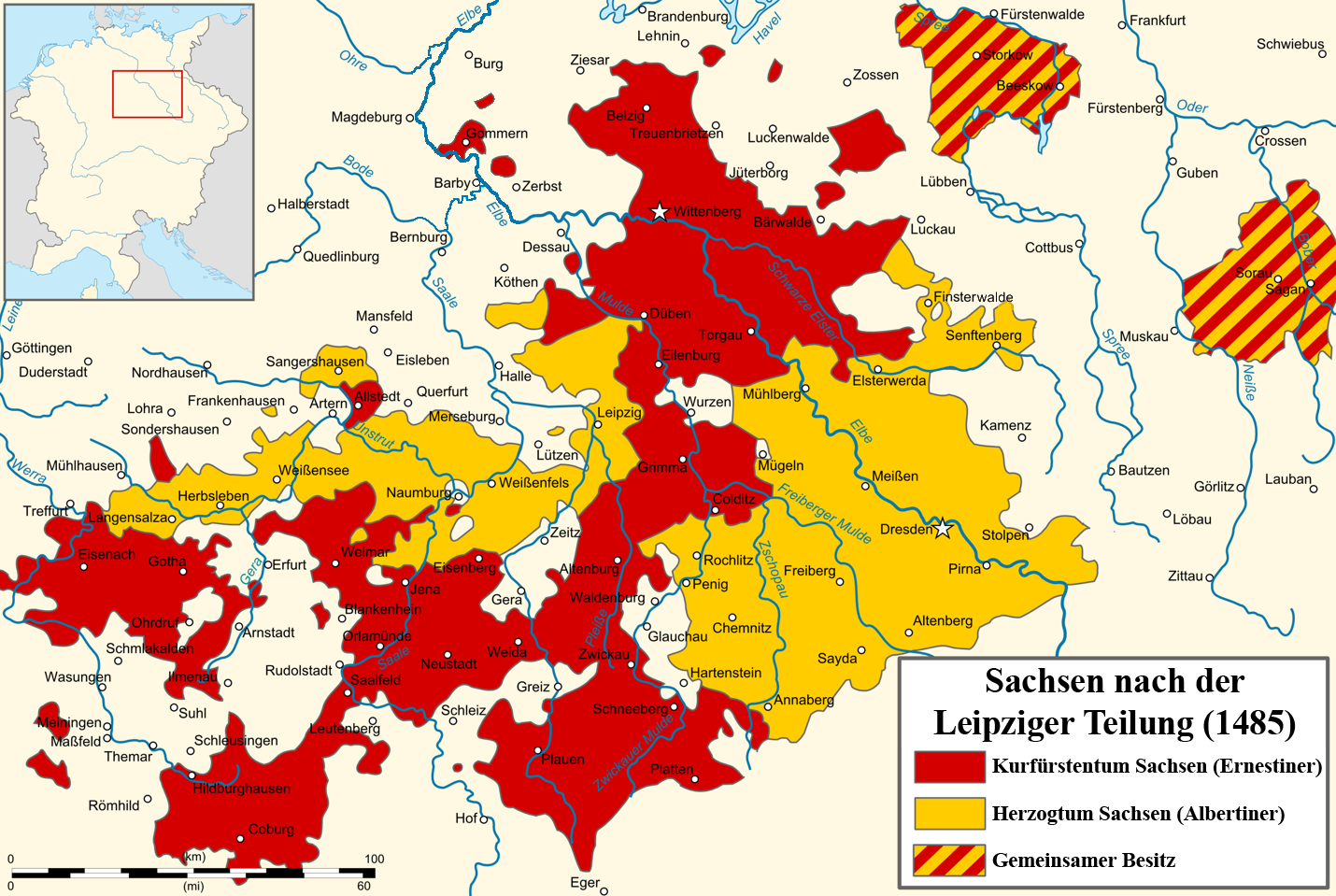
Ernestine domains (red) upon the Treaty of Leipzig (1485)

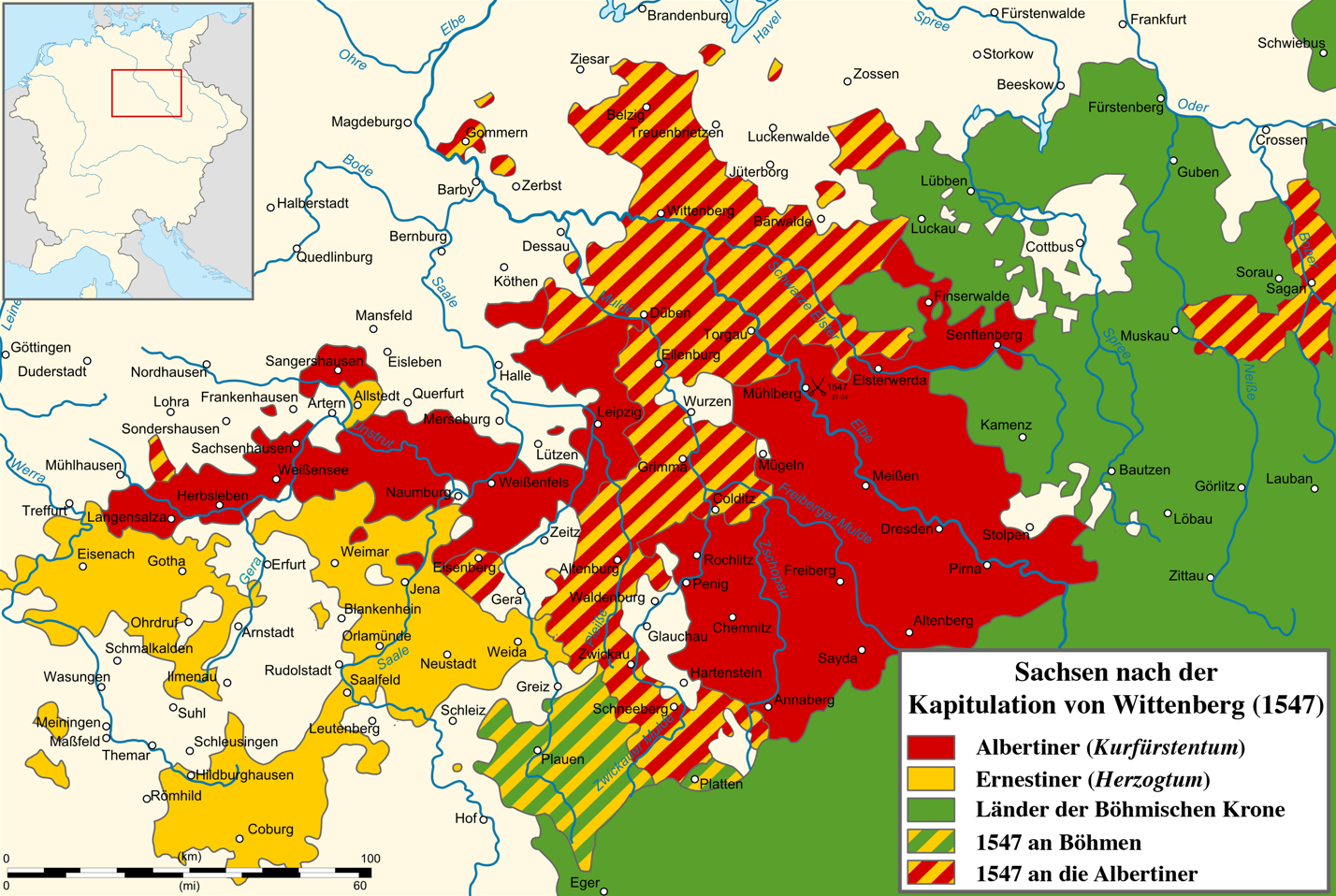
Ernestine domains (yellow) upon the Capitulation of Wittenberg (1547)

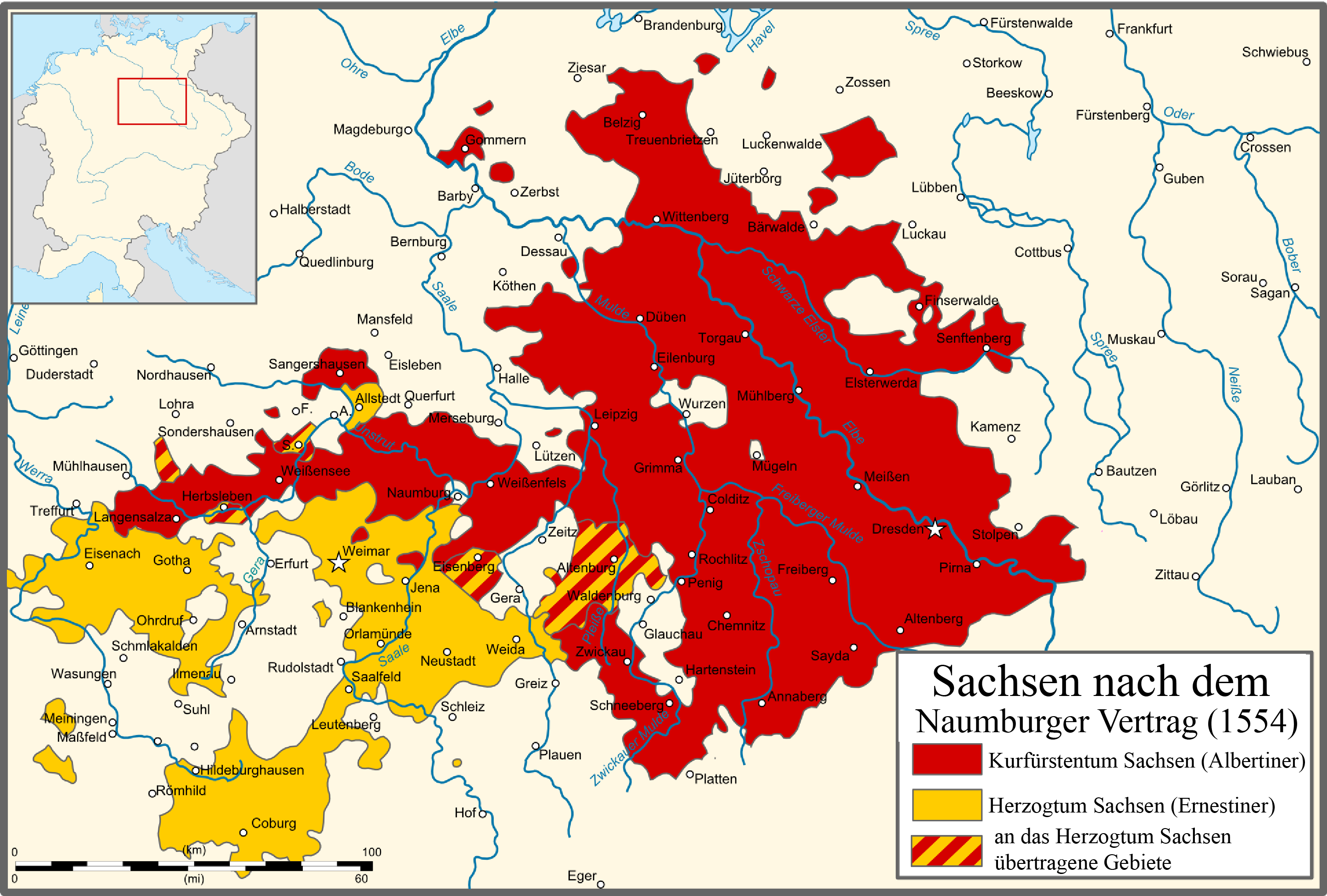
Ernestine domains (yellow) upon the Treaty of Naumburg (1554)

== Final days ==
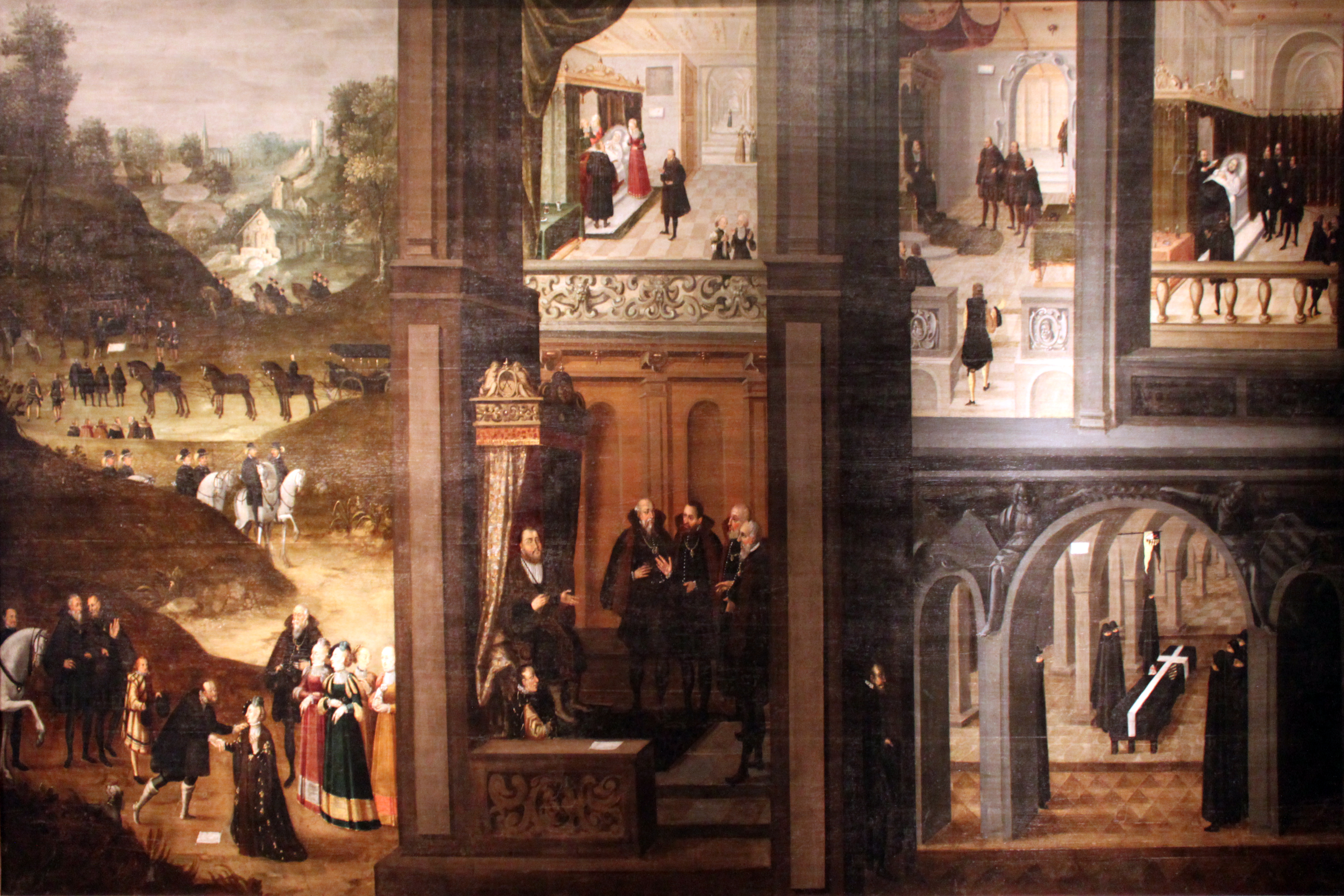
Life of John Frederick of Saxony:The return 1552 and his last years, painting 1630, Deutsches Historisches Museum Berlin

The sudden attack upon the emperor by Elector Maurice made an end of John Frederick's imprisonment, and he was released on 1 September 1552. He firmly refused to bind himself to comply in matters of religion with the decisions of a future council or diet, declaring that he was resolved to adhere until his grave to the doctrine contained in the Augsburg Confession.

His homeward journey was a triumphal march. He met his family after an absence of five years at Wolfersdorf Castle which he had built as a hunting lodge earlier, and he renamed it Schloss Froehliche Wiederkunft ("Palace of Happy Returning").

He moved the seat of government to Weimar and reformed the conditions of his country, but died within two years. A special object of his care was the University of Jena, which he planned in place of Wittenberg, which he had lost (1547). He died in Weimar.

== Marriage and family ==
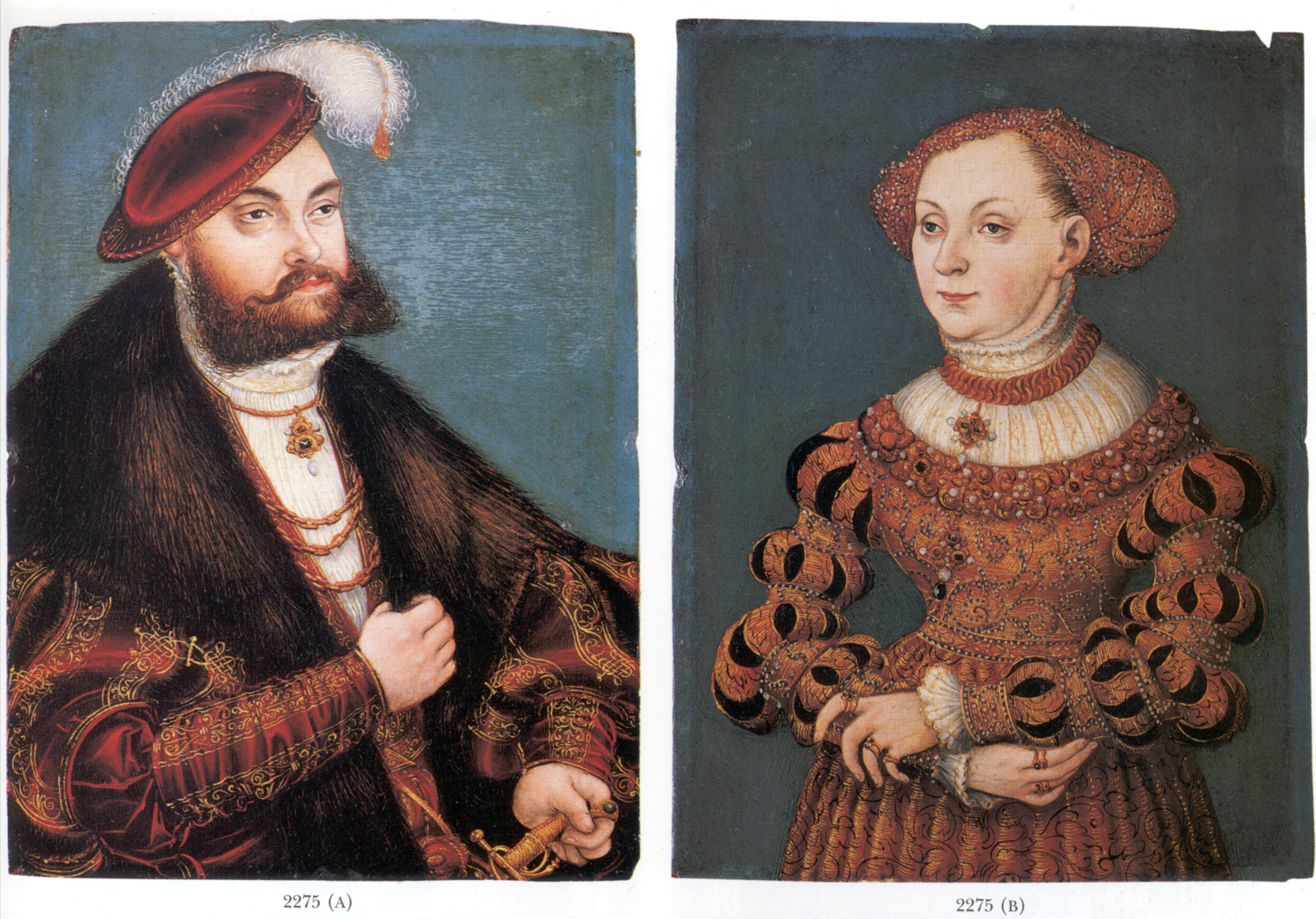
Double portrait of John Frederick and Sibylle of Cleves

In Torgau on 9 February 1527 John Frederick married Sibylle of Cleves, daughter of John III, Duke of Cleves and sister to Anne of Cleves, who was briefly Queen of England as the fourth wife of King Henry VIII. They had four sons:

1. John Frederick II, Duke of Saxony (b. Torgau, 8 January 1529 – d. as imperial prisoner at Schloss Steyer, Upper Austria, 19 May 1595).
2. John William, Duke of Saxe-Weimar (b. Torgau, 11 March 1530 – d. Weimar, 2 March 1573).
3. John Ernest (b. Weimar, 5 January 1535 – d. Weimar, 11 January 1535) died in infancy.
4. John Frederick III, Duke of Saxe-Gotha (1554–1565) (b. Torgau, 16 January 1538 – d. Jena, 31 October 1565).

== See also ==
- History of Saxony
- Treaty of Naumburg (1554)
- Portrait of John Frederick I, Elector of Saxony

== Sources ==
- Blaschke, Karlheinz (2002). "Die Leipziger Teilung der wettinischen Länder von 1485". Beiträge zur Verfassungs- und Verwaltungsgeschichte Sachsens: Ausgewählte Aufsätze von Karlheinz Blaschke. Leipzig: Leipziger Universitätsverlag. pp. 323–335.
- Groß, Reiner (2007). Die Wettiner. Stuttgart: Kohlhammer Verlag.
- Tebruck, Stefan (2005). "Zwischen Integration und Selbstbehauptung: Thüringen im wettinischen Herrschaftsbereich". Fragen der politischen Integration im mittelalterlichen Europa. Ostfildern: Jan Thorbecke Verlag. pp. 375–412, 589–591.
- Wilson, Peter H. (2016). Heart of Europe: A History of the Holy Roman Empire. Cambridge: Harvard University Press.
- Chisholm, Hugh, ed. (1911). "John Frederick I." . Encyclopædia Britannica. Vol. 15 (11th ed.). Cambridge University Press. p. 458.

John Frederick I of Saxony House of Wettin Born: 30 June 1503 Died: 3 March 1554
Regnal titles
Preceded by John	Elector of Saxony; 1532–1547	Succeeded by Maurice
Preceded by Maurice	Duke of Saxony; 1547–1554	Succeeded by John Frederick II
