= John Ernest, Duke of Saxe-Coburg =

John Ernest
- Duke of Saxe-Coburg; Landgrave of Thuringia
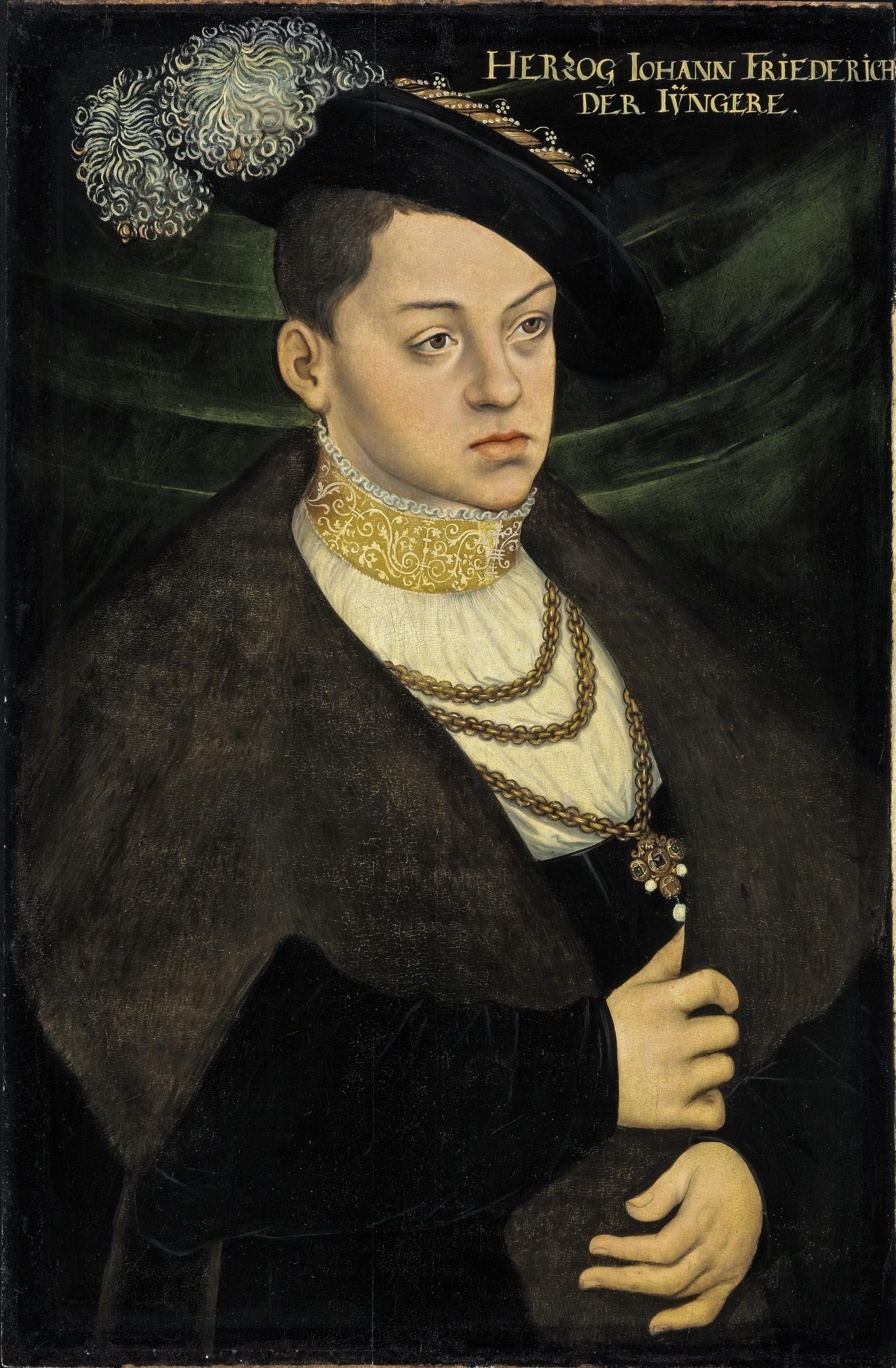
- Portrait by Lucas Cranach the Elder
- Reign: 1542–1553
- Predecessor: John Frederick I
- Successor: John Frederick II
- Born: 10 May 1521; Coburg
- Died: 8 February 1553 (aged 31); Coburg
- Spouse: Catherine, daughter of Philip I, Duke of Brunswick-Grubenhagen
Names
- Johann Ernst
- House: House of Wettin; Ernestine Line
- Father: John, Elector of Saxony
- Mother: Margaret of Anhalt-Köthen
- Religion: Lutheran

John Ernest (German: Johann Ernst) (10 May 1521 – 8 February 1553) was a Duke of Saxe-Coburg and a member of the House of Wettin.

== Early life ==
John Ernest was born in Coburg as the third (but second surviving and the youngest) son of John, Elector of Saxony, by his second wife, Princess Margaret of Anhalt-Köthen.

== Biography ==
After the death of his father (1532), his half-brother, John Frederick I, became Elector of Saxony. For the first ten years, John Frederick shared the rule (but not the Electoral dignity) with John Ernest. In 1542 John Frederick I decided to rule alone, and ceded the Franconian areas of the Wettin family lands (Coburg and Eisfeld) to John Ernest. However, it was not until Battle of Mühlberg in 1547, in which the elder brother was captured by Emperor Charles V, that John Ernest could govern undisturbed in Coburg.

== Personal life ==
John Ernest married Catherine of Brunswick-Grubenhagen, daughter of Philip I, Duke of Brunswick-Grubenhagen, but the marriage was childless. After his death in Coburg, the city fell for a few months to John Frederick — released from the imperial detention — before his death, and then, to his three sons, which governed the Ernestine lands together from 1554 for some years. His widow later married Philip II, Count of Schwarzburg-Leutenberg.
