= John, Elector of Saxony =

Elector of Saxony from 1525 to 1532

John
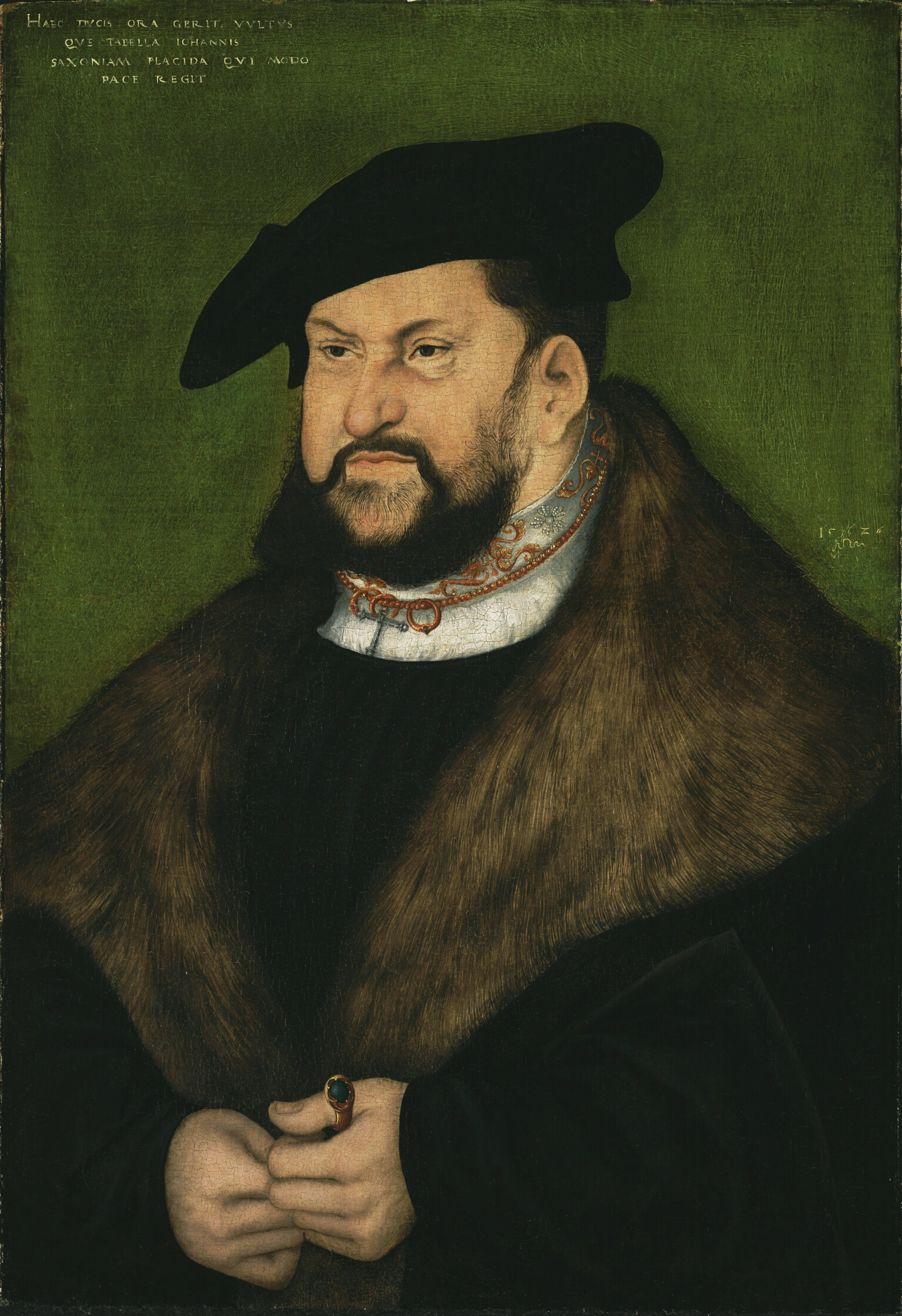
- Portrait by Lucas Cranach the Elder, 1526

Elector of Saxony
- Reign: 5 May 1525 – 16 August 1532
- Predecessor: Frederick III
- Successor: Johann Frederick I
- Born: 30 June 1468; Meissen, Electorate of Saxony, Holy Roman Empire
- Died: 16 August 1532 (aged 64); Schweinitz, Electorate of Saxony, Holy Roman Empire
- Burial: Schlosskirche, Wittenberg
- Spouse: Sophie of Mecklenburg-Schwerin (m. 1500; died 1503) Margaret of Anhalt-Köthen (m. 1513; died 1521)
- Issue Detail: Johann Frederick I, Elector of Saxony; Maria, Duchess of Pomerania; John Ernest, Duke of Saxe-Coburg
- House: Wettin (Ernestine line)
- Father: Ernest, Elector of Saxony
- Mother: Elisabeth of Bavaria

John (30 June 1468 – 16 August 1532), known as John the Steadfast or John the Constant (German: Johann der Beständige), was Elector of Saxony from 1525 until 1532. He belonged to the House of Wettin.

John was notable for organising the Lutheran Church in Saxony at both governmental and administrative levels. He was assisted by Martin Luther, whose "Saxon model" for a Lutheran church was soon adopted in other territories of the Holy Roman Empire. Following the break with Rome, Luther relied on John for secular authority and financial support on behalf of a church deprived of much of its previous income.

He also played a role in the Protestation at Speyer.

== Biography ==
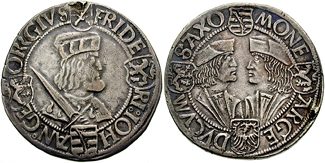
Guldengroschen of Saxony, c. 1508–1525. The obverse shows Johann's older brother, Frederick, while on the reverse, Johann is portrayed face to face with George, Duke of Saxony.

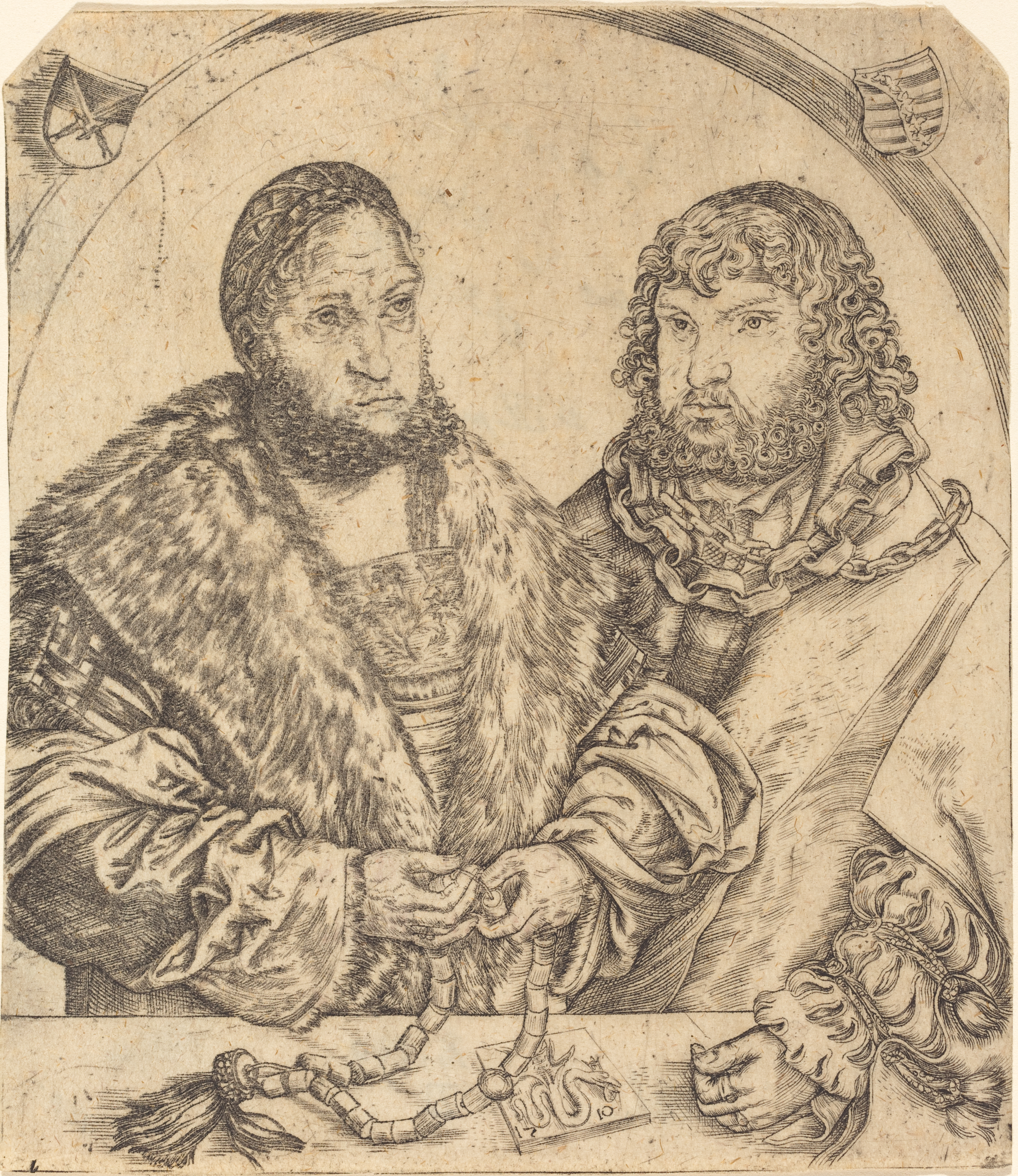
Lucas Cranach the Elder, Frederick the Wise and John the Constant of Saxony, 1509, National Gallery of Art

Born in Meissen, John was the fifth of the seven children of Ernest, Elector of Saxony and Elisabeth of Bavaria. From 1486 onward he was the heir presumptive of his childless brother Frederick the Wise. John received a part of the paternal inheritance and afterwards assisted his kinsman, Maximilian I, Holy Roman Emperor, in several campaigns. On his brother's death in 1525 John inherited the title of elector and as an early adherent of Luther was soon prominent among Protestant reformers. As his nickname "The Steadfast" indicates, he resolutely continued the policies of his brother toward protecting the progress of the Protestant Reformation.

Having assisted in suppressing an uprising during the German Peasants' War in 1525, John helped Philip I, Landgrave of Hesse, found the League of Gotha, formed in 1526 for the protection of the Reformers. He was active at the Diet of Speyer in 1526, and signed a protest against the recess of the diet. That gave him an opportunity to reform the church in Saxony, where a plan for divine service was drawn up by Luther. Thus in 1527 the Lutheran Church was established as the state church in Ernestine Saxony, with the Elector as Chief Bishop. John, who had already been a zealous Lutheran for some time, now exercised full authority over the Church, introduced the Lutheran Confession, ordered the deposition of all priests who continued in the Catholic faith, and directed the use of a vernacular liturgy drawn up by Luther. He was a leader of the Schmalkaldic League of Protestant states formed in 1530 to defend the Reformation, and assented to the Nuremberg religious peace in 1532.

As his nickname betrays, he had the same positive attitude to the Reformation as his older brother. His steadfastness and his courage to maintain his confessional position probably brought him the most fame with his contemporaries. Christian beliefs were the basis of his political decisions, which were regarded as very just. In political matters, he was often very hesitant. In his collaboration with Philip I, with whom he was closely connected by virtue of his common religious beliefs, Philip was the driving force for and outspoken advocate of a more for an aggressive foreign policy while John, on the other hand, was particularly concerned with the question of whether to defend himself as a Protestant against the Emperor.

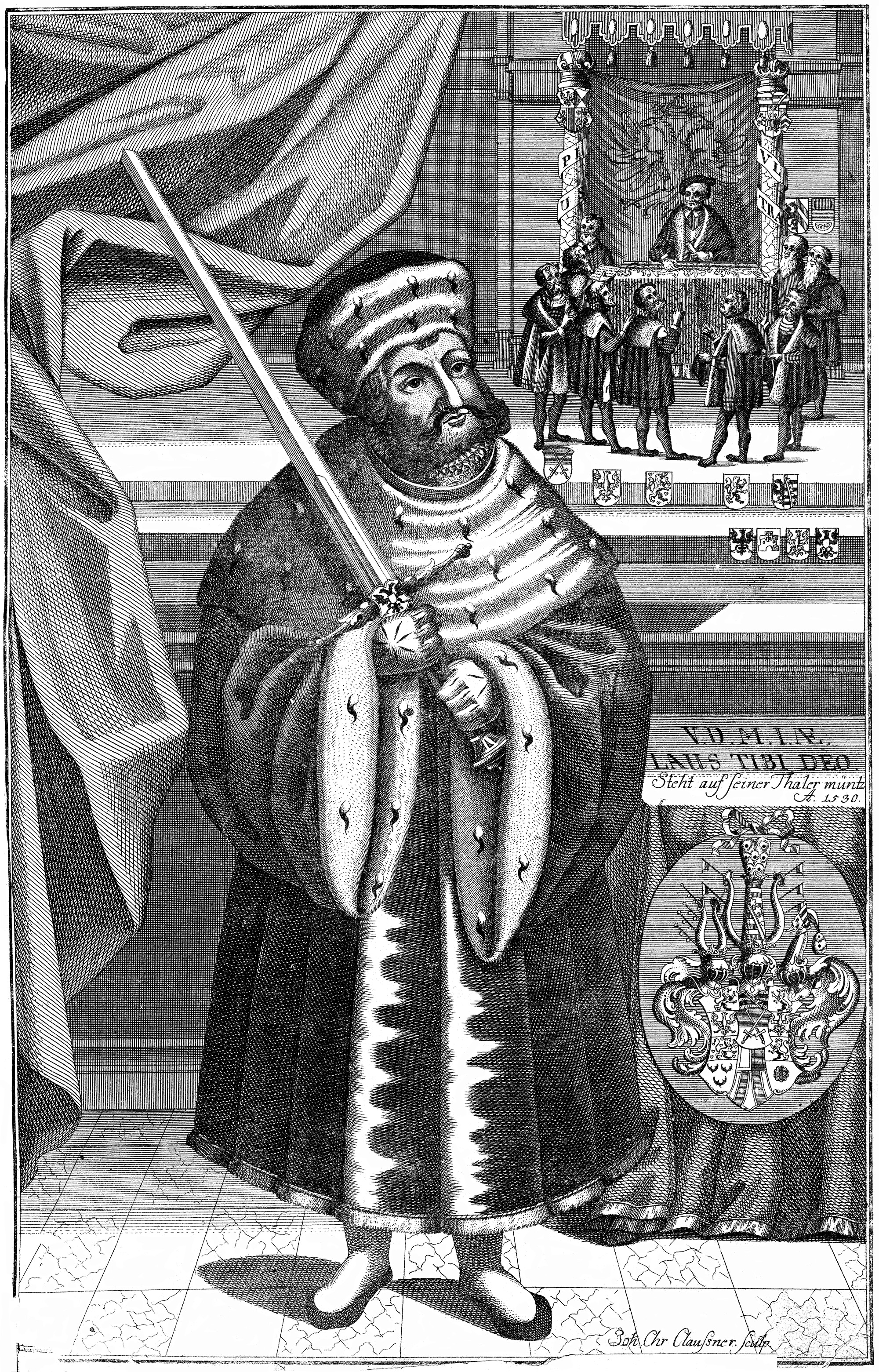
Portrait of Johann of Saxony (17th Century)

As the patron of Martin Luther, John maintained a very close, almost friendly relationship with the leading theologian of the Protestants. Luther often expressed a positive opinion about John, especially for his behavior at the Diet of Augsburg in 1530, and praised him thus: "I am sure that the Elector Johann of Saxony had the Holy Spirit. In Augsburg he proved this admirably by his confession. John said, 'Tell my scholars that they are doing what is right, praise and honor God, and take no regard for me or my country.'" By his insistence on the Protestant profession of faith, John even went so far as to dismiss those Protestant theologians who were too compliant to the Emperor. In 1529, John belonged to the princely representatives of the Protestant minority (protestation) at the Reichstag in Speyer.

In the almost 40 years that John governed as a duke over the Electorate of Saxony, he was often overshadowed by the person of his brother Frederick, who, as the eldest of the House of Wettin and the incumbent Elector, decisively determined the policy of Saxony. John is sometimes wrongly portrayed in the history and politics of the Electorate of Saxony as a background figure at the beginning of the Reformation, in contrast to his brother Frederick and his son and successor John Frederick.

The Evangelical Church in Germany honors John's significance during the Reformation, with a memorial day in the Evangelische Namenkalender on 16 August.

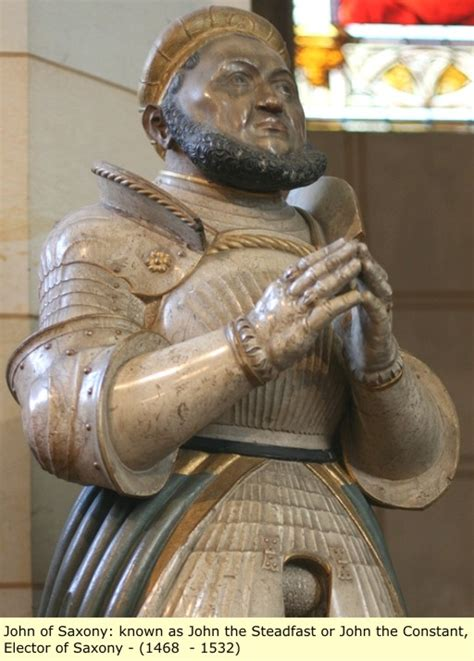
John the Steadfast inside the Schlosskirche, castle church

He died in Schweinitz. After his death he was, like his brother Frederick, buried in the famous Castle Church in Wittenberg with a grave by Hans Vischer. He was succeeded by his eldest son Johann Frederick.

== Marriage and children ==
In Torgau on 1 March 1500 Johann married firstly Sophie of Mecklenburg-Schwerin, daughter of Magnus II, Duke of Mecklenburg. They had one son:

1. Johann Frederick I, Elector of Saxony (30 June 1503, Torgau – 3 March 1554, Weimar).

On 13 November 1513 Johann married secondly Margaret of Anhalt-Köthen in Torgau. They had four children:

1. Maria (15 December 1515, Weimar – 7 January 1583, Wolgast), married on 27 February 1536 Duke Philip I of Pomerania-Wolgast
2. Margaret (25 April 1518, Zwickau – 10 March 1545), married Hans Buser
3. John (born and died 26 September 1519, Weimar) died at birth.
4. John Ernest, Duke of Saxe-Coburg (10 May 1521, Coburg – 8 February 1553, Coburg).
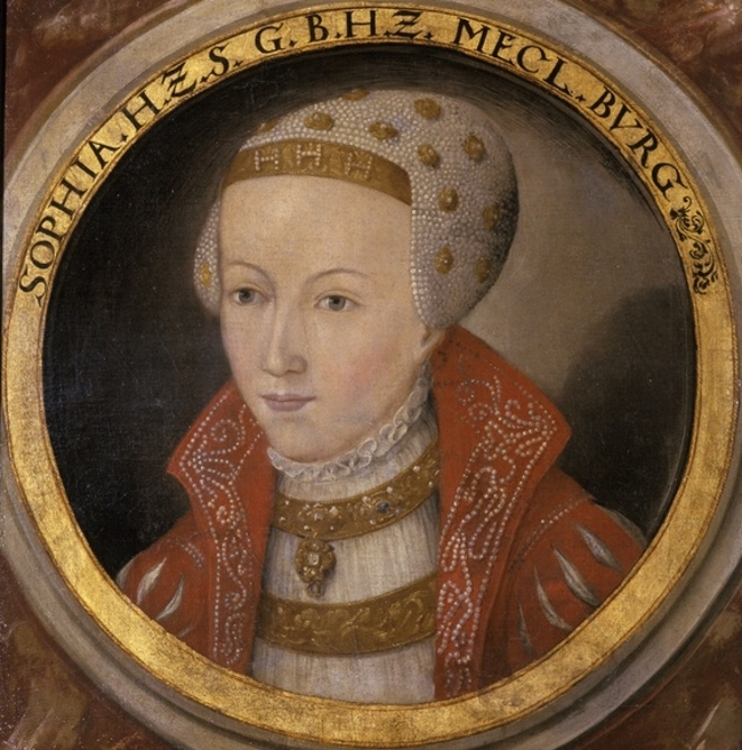
Sophie of Mecklenburg (1481–1503)

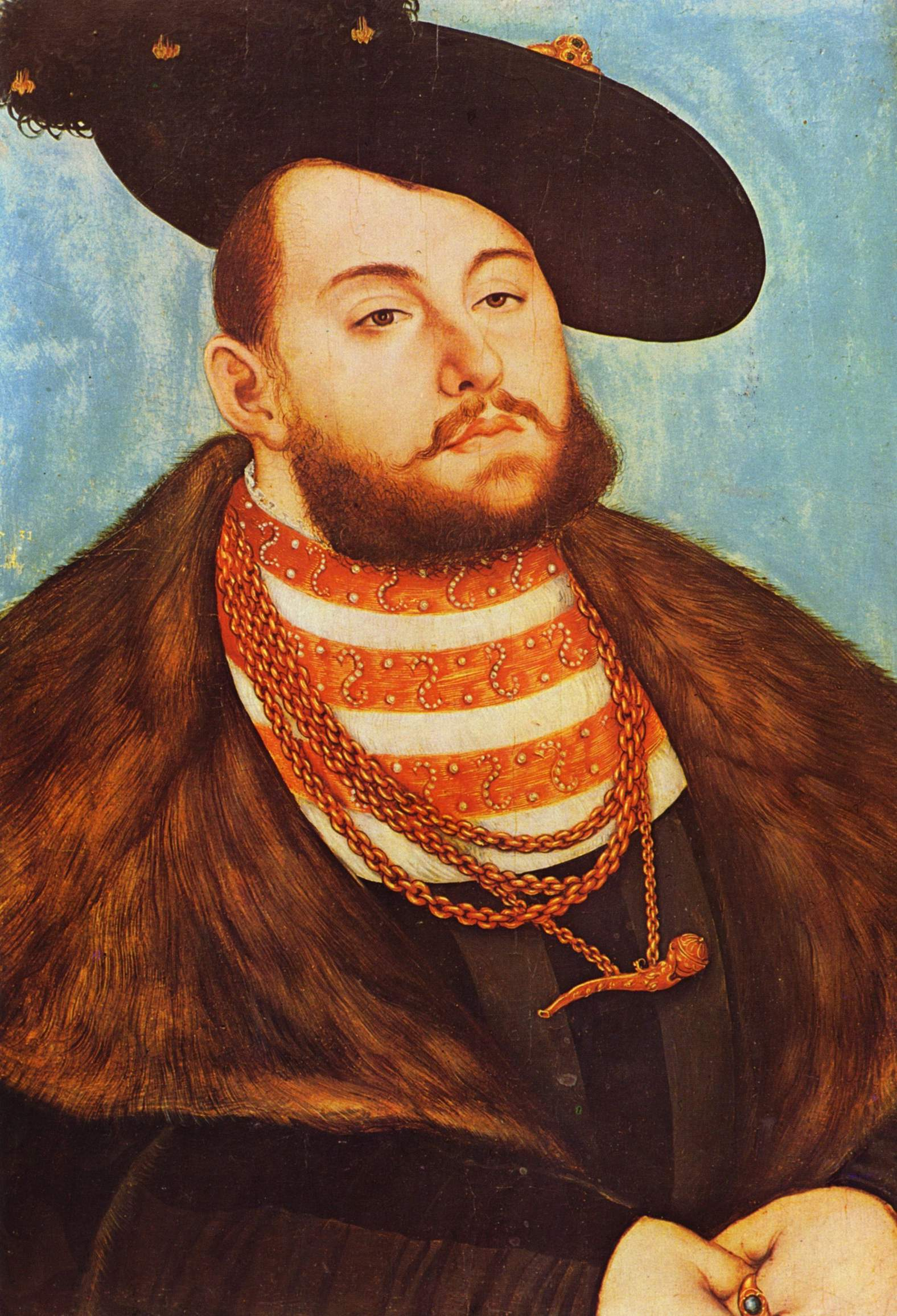
Johann Frederick I

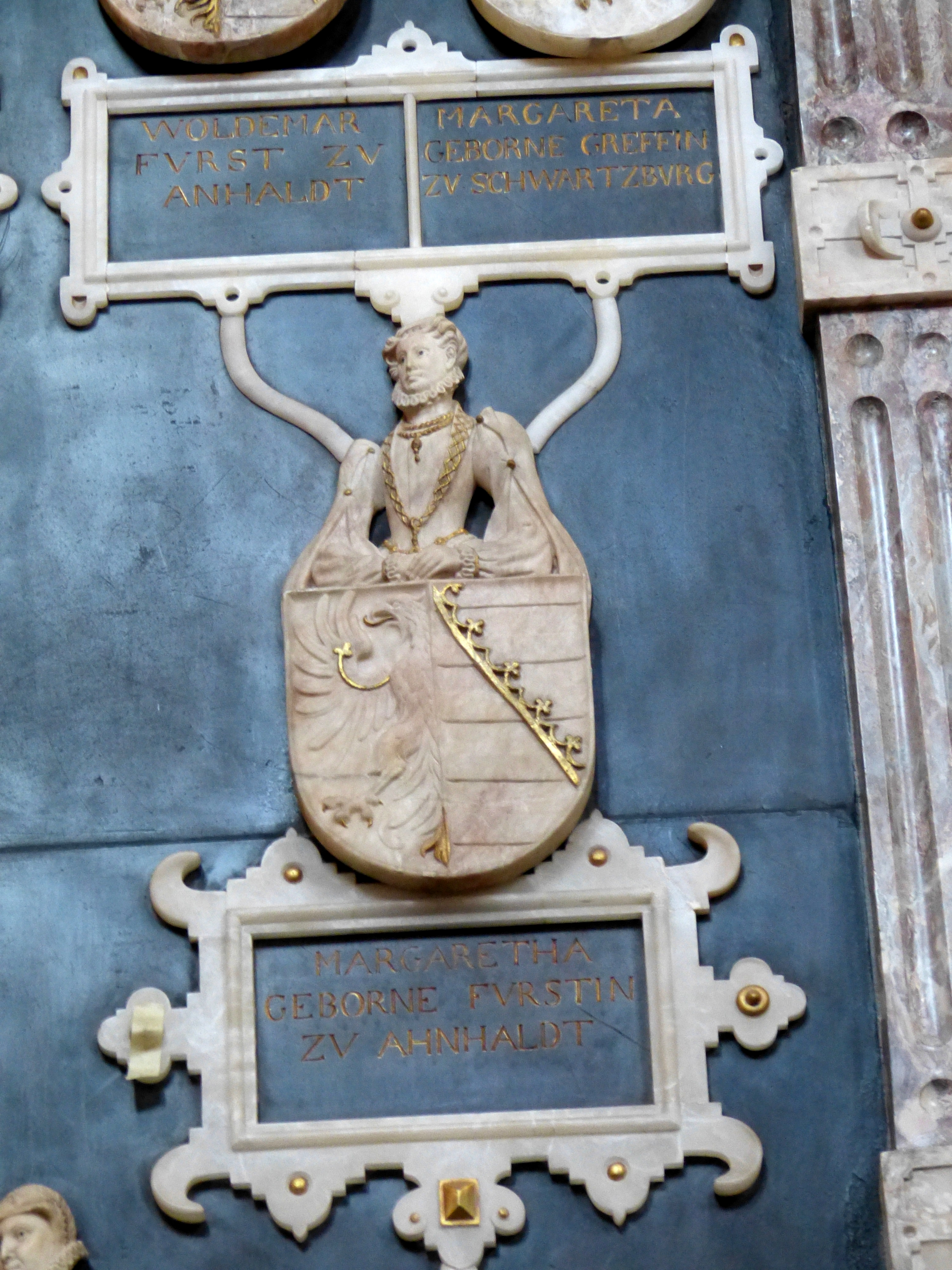
Margaret of Anhalt-Köthen

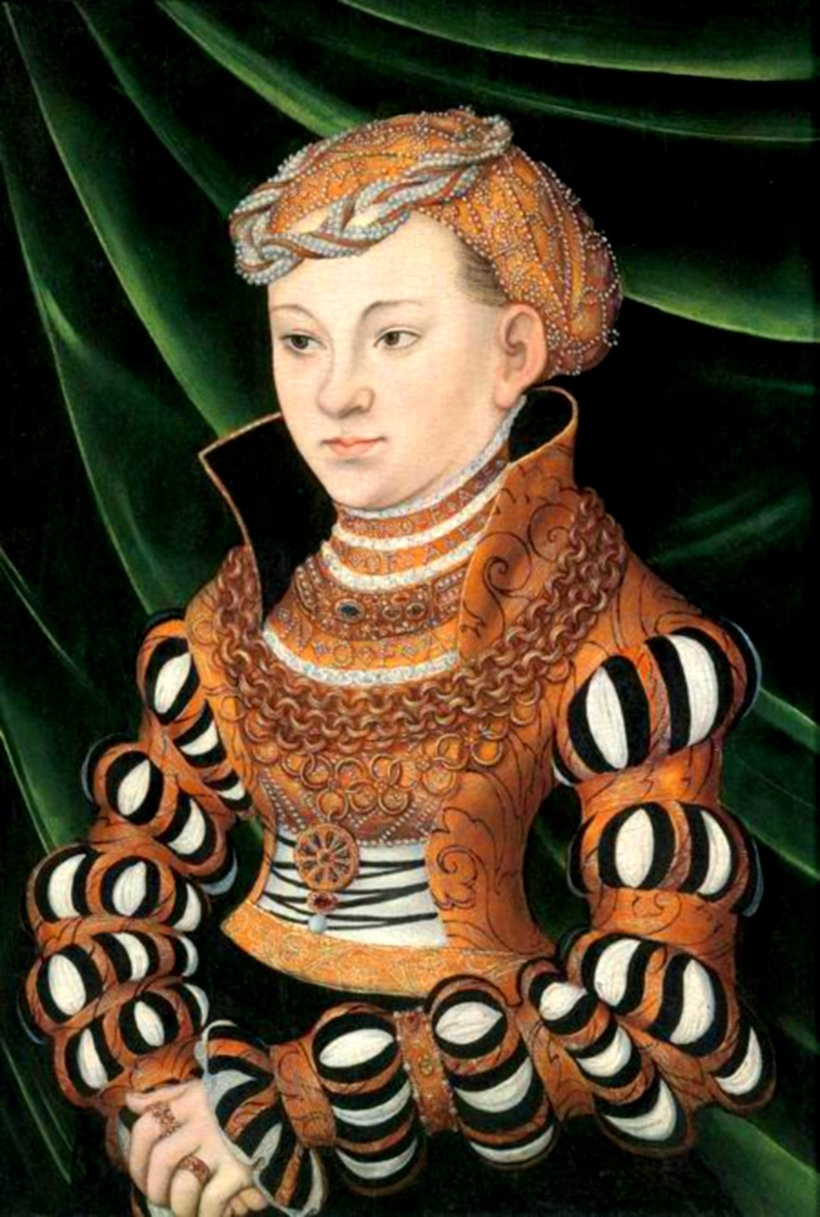
Maria of Saxony (1515–1589), by Lucas Cranach the Elder

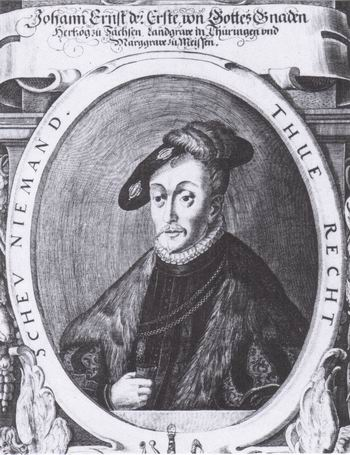
John Ernest, Duke of Saxe-Coburg 1521–1553

== Ancestry ==
Ancestors of John, Elector of Saxony

16. Frederick III, Landgrave of Thuringia
8. Frederick I, Elector of Saxony
17. Catherine of Henneberg-Schleusingen
4. Frederick II, Elector of Saxony
18. Henry the Mild, Duke of Brunswick-Lüneburg
9. Catherine of Brunswick
19. Sofie of Pomerania-Wolgast
2. Ernest, Elector of Saxony
20. Leopold III, Duke of Austria
10. Ernest, Duke of Austria
21. Viridis Visconti
5. Margaret of Austria
22. Siemowit IV, Duke of Masovia
11. Cymburgis of Masovia
23. Alexandra of Lithuania
1. Johann, Elector of Saxony
24. John II, Duke of Bavaria
12. Ernest, Duke of Bavaria
25. Catherine of Gorizia
6. Albert III, Duke of Bavaria
26. Bernabò Visconti
13. Elisabetta Visconti
27. Beatrice della Scala
3. Elisabeth of Bavaria
28. Albert I, Duke of Brunswick-Grubenhagen
14. Eric I, Duke of Brunswick-Grubenhagen
29. Agnes of Brunswick
7. Anna of Brunswick-Grubenhagen-Einbeck
30. Otto I, Duke of Brunswick-Göttingen
15. Elisabeth of Brunswick-Göttingen
31. either his 1st wife, Miroslawa of Holstein-Plön, or his 2nd wife, Margaret of Jülich

John, Elector of Saxony House of Wettin Born: 30 June 1468 Died: 16 August 1532
Regnal titles
Preceded by Frederick III	Elector of Saxony; 1525–1532	Succeeded by John Frederick
