= The Fourteen of Consolation =

Writing by Martin Luther

The Fourteen of Consolation (1519) (Latin: Tessaradecas consolaloria pro laborantibus et oneratis) is an early consolatory writing in Latin by the religious reformer Martin Luther. Prompted by the request of German humanist George Spalatin, Luther wrote this piece to provide comfort to Prince-elector Frederick the Wise in a period of severe illness when many feared for his life.

== Structure ==
The Fourteen of Consolation for those who are weary and burdened, to give the full title, is based on the contemporary reredos or altar screen, and possesses two main parts with seven chapters each. Luther envisions a reredos with two panels, one corresponding to evils and one corresponding to blessings. Specifically, each part's respective chapters address the evils or blessings (1) within, (2) before, (3) behind, (4) on the left, (5) on the right, (6) beneath, and (7) above us. Luther chose this metaphorical structure to not only provide comfort to Frederick as he faced death, but also to encourage him to turn away from invoking the popular regional cult of saints, called the Fourteen Holy Helpers. Luther in his dedicatory epistle wrote that "superstition has invented" them and that he felt motivated, from a Christian calling, to assist the sick.

== Influence ==
Past scholarship has claimed that Luther was inspired in the above format by a panel painting of the Fourteen Holy Helpers at St. Mary's Church at Frederick the Wise's residence in Torgau. Called The Fourteen Helpers in Need, some even go so far as to claim that Luther "must have had it in mind" when writing. It is uncertain if Luther would have had knowledge of the panel painting by the time of the composition of The Fourteen of Consolation; it is clear, however, that Frederick the Wise did have familiarity with the piece and therefore would have picked up on a reference to it if one were being made.

== Publication ==
As Frederick the Wise was unable to read Latin, the language in which Luther wrote The Fourteen of Consolation, Spalatin translated the work into German for the Elector. Upon Frederick's recovery, both he and Spalatin encouraged Luther to publish the work; however, in a letter of December 7, 1519 to the court chaplain, Luther expressed hesitation and that it would be attacked "for its teaching of Christ." By early 1520 Frederick the Wise and Spalatin prevailed and The Fourteen of Consolation was distributed in both Latin and German.
