= Dresden Altarpiece =

Triptych by Albrecht Dürer, 1496 to 1497

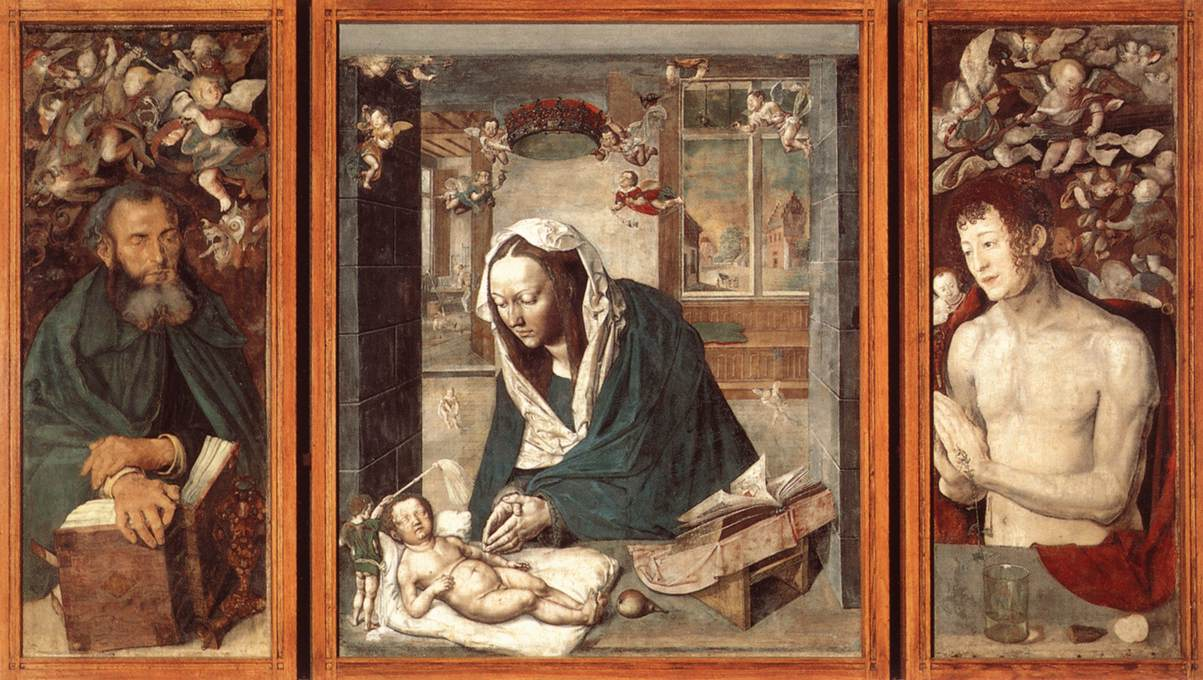
- Artist: Albrecht Dürer
- Year: 1496-1497 and perhaps 1503-1504
- Medium: Tempera on canvas
- Location: Gemäldegalerie Alte Meister; Dresden

The Dresden Altarpiece is a triptych by the German Renaissance artist Albrecht Dürer, executed between 1496 and 1497, and perhaps continued in 1503–1504. It is housed in the Gemäldegalerie Alte Meister of Dresden, Germany.

== History ==
The painting was one of the first commissions received from Frederick III, Elector of Saxony, together with the Seven Sorrows Polyptych and the Portrait of Frederick III of Saxony. Dürer knew the elector during the latter's short stay in Nuremberg in April 1496.

The work was destined to the chapel in the Wittenberg Castle and, initially, should include only the central panel with a Virgin and Child. The use of tempera (in an area where oil painting was already common) was perhaps connected to the need of a quick completion

In 1503–1504, perhaps in the wake of a plague, two side shutters were added: these were painted with St. Sebastian, patron of the infected, and St. Anthony the Abbot, the protector against ergotism. The dating and the attribution of the side panels is disputed.

== Description ==
Differently from most contemporary triptychs, the side shutters could not be closed due to the use of a canvas. The central scene depicts the Madonna Adoring the Child, who sleeps on a cushion over a wide parapet. A book (symbolizing the Holy Texts) lies next to him, together with a pear, an allegory of the original sin. Mary's appearance resembles that in Dieric Bouts' works, as well as those by Squarcione and Mantegna. It is likely that she is a portrait of Dürer's wife, Agnes Frey.

The room behind Mary is rendered in wide angle perspective. It opens on another room, with St. Joseph's workshop, while a city landscape appears from a window. The upper part of the scene is populated by angels: some hold Mary's floating crown, while other are spreading incense from thuribles. The side panels also contain numerous puttoes in the background. Their style difference could indicate the intervention of assistants.

== See also ==
- List of paintings by Albrecht Dürer

== Sources ==
- Costantino Porcu, ed. (2004). Dürer. Milan: Rizzoli.
