= Caspar Cruciger =

Caspar Cruciger is name of two Lutheran theologians of the Protestant Reformation:

- Caspar Creuziger or Caspar Cruciger the Elder (1504–1548), German humanist, professor of theology and preacher
- Caspar Cruciger the Younger (1525–1597), German theologian, son of the above
