= Zwilling =

Zwilling may refer to:

== People ==
- David Zwilling (born 1949), Austrian alpine skier
- Dutch Zwilling (Edward Harrison Zwilling) (1888-1978), American professional baseball player
- Gabriel Zwilling (c. 1487-1558), German Lutheran and Protestant Reformer
- Iris Zwilling (born 2001), Dutch cricketer
- Martin Zwilling (born 1945), American business executive
- Mikkie Zwilling (born 1999), Dutch cricketer

== Military equipment ==
- 12.8 cm FlaK 40, a German-made World War II anti-aircraft gun with a 'twin' variant
- Heinkel He 111Z "Zwilling", 'twin' variant of a German World War II airplane
- Bf 109Z "Zwilling", an experimental German aircraft from World War II
- MG 81 machine gun, a German-made World War II machine gun with a 'twin' variant
- Z/FlAK 85, a modern Austrian anti-aircraft gun with twin barrels
- Flakpanzer IV mit 3.7 cm FlaK Zwilling, a German-made World War II mobile anti-aircraft gun with two barrels

== Other ==
- Zwilling J. A. Henckels, a knife manufacturer based in Solingen
- Professors Zwillinge, a series of books from the 1920s by German writer Else Ury
- Zwilling, the second album by Eric Fish
- Zwillinge (Locomotives), a class of small narrow gauge paired locomotives built in Germany in the late 19th and early 20th century
