= Portrait of Frederick III of Saxony =

1496 painting by Albrecht Dürer

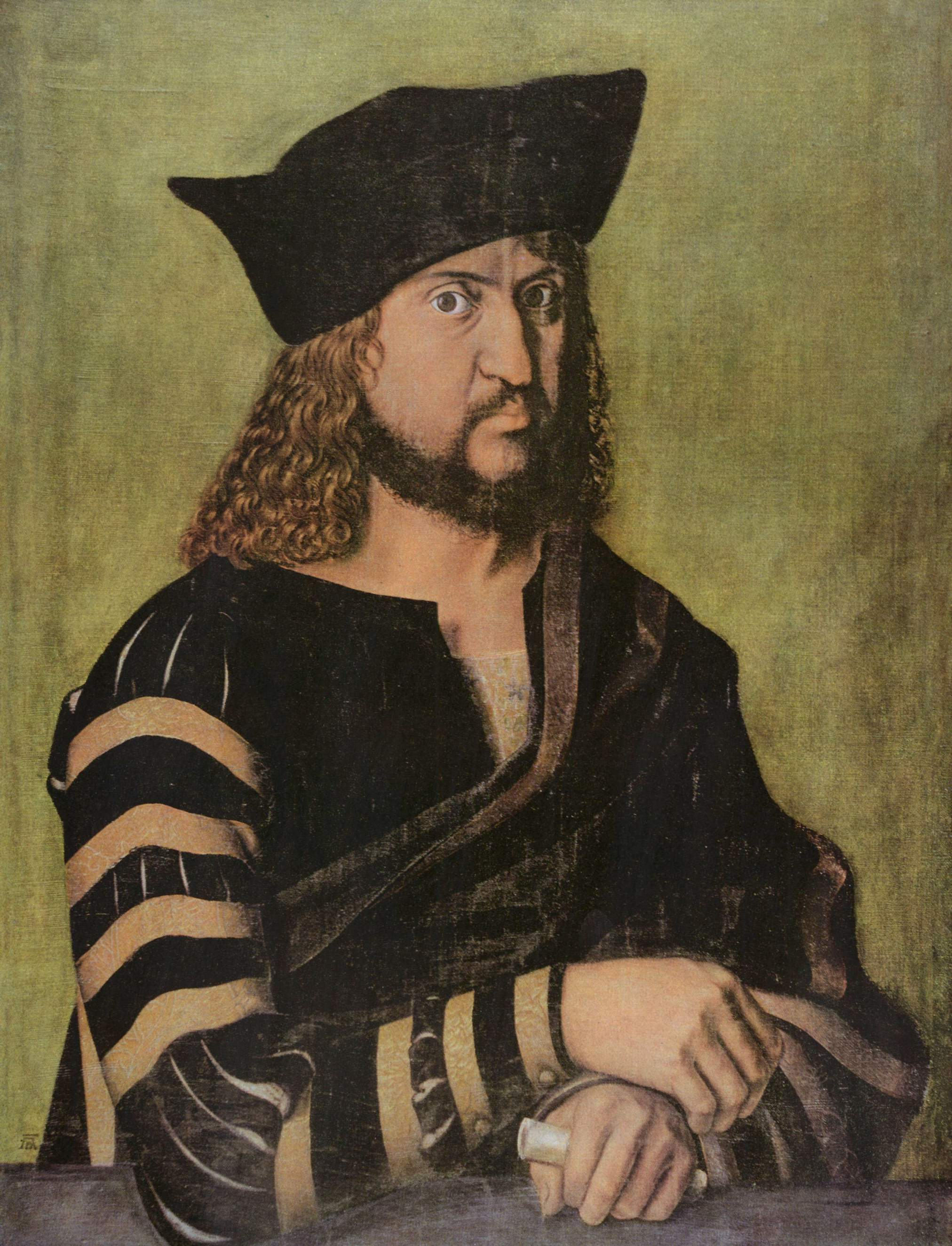
- Artist: Albrecht Dürer
- Year: 1496
- Medium: Tempera on canvas
- Dimensions: 76 cm × 57 cm (30 in × 22 in)
- Location: Gemäldegalerie; Berlin

The Portrait of Frederick III of Saxony is a tempera-on-canvas painting by German Renaissance artist Albrecht Dürer, executed in 1496. It is housed in the Gemäldegalerie of Berlin, Germany.

== History ==
The painting was one of the first commissions received from Frederick III, Elector of Saxony, together with the Seven Sorrows Polyptych and the central panel of the Dresden Altarpiece. Dürer knew the elector during the latter's short stay in Nuremberg in April 1496.

Dürer portrayed the elector again in an engraving in 1524.

== Description ==
Dürer portrayed Frederick's bust from three-quarters, looking right, above a dark green background. Elements such as the parapet on which his arms lie, or the hands holding a roll, were typical of Flemish art of the period.

Frederick's imperious personality, as well as his status, are emphasized by the large beret and by his determined glance

== See also ==
- List of paintings by Albrecht Dürer
