= George Spalatin =

German humanist and theologian

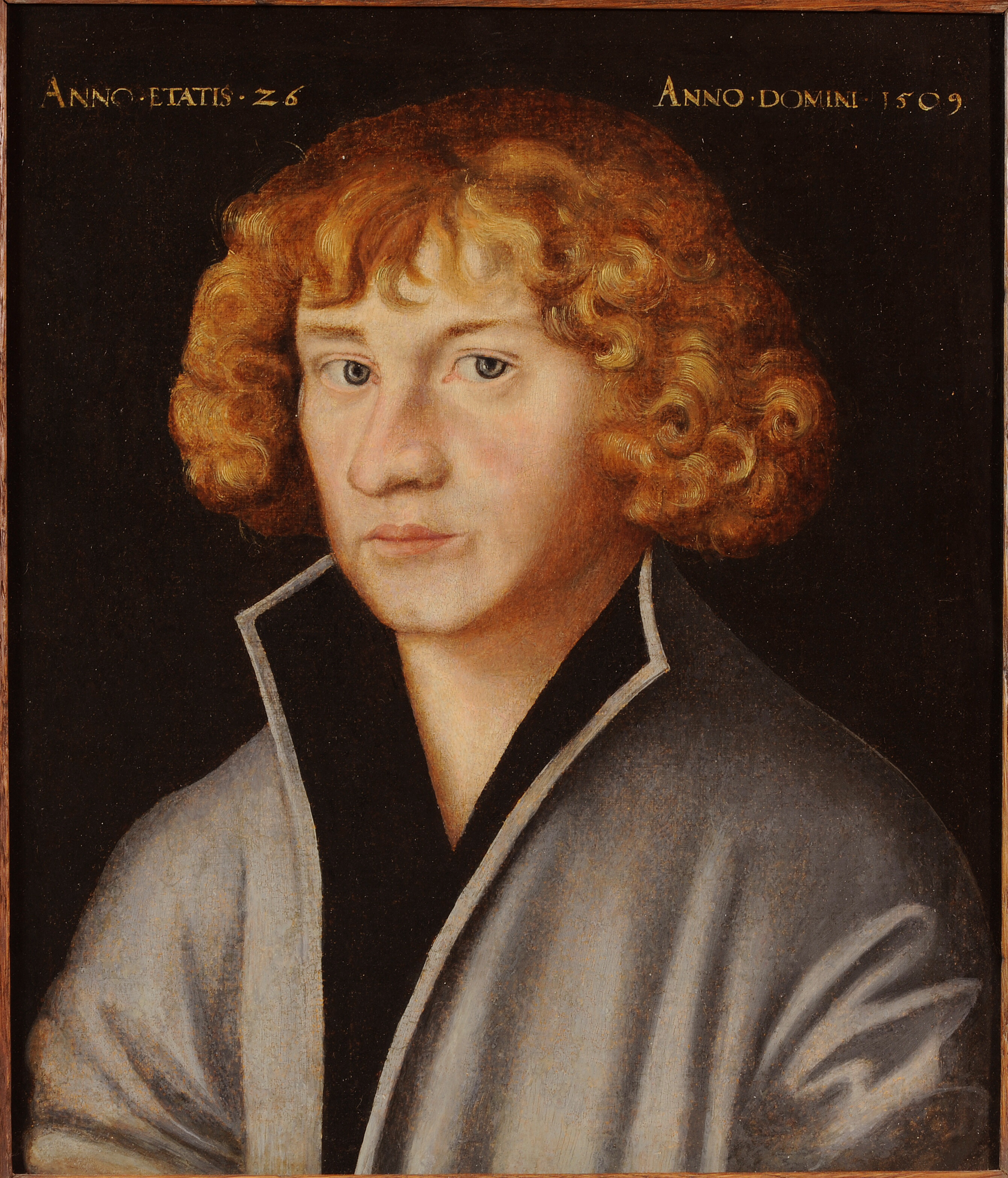
Portrait by Lucas Cranach the Elder

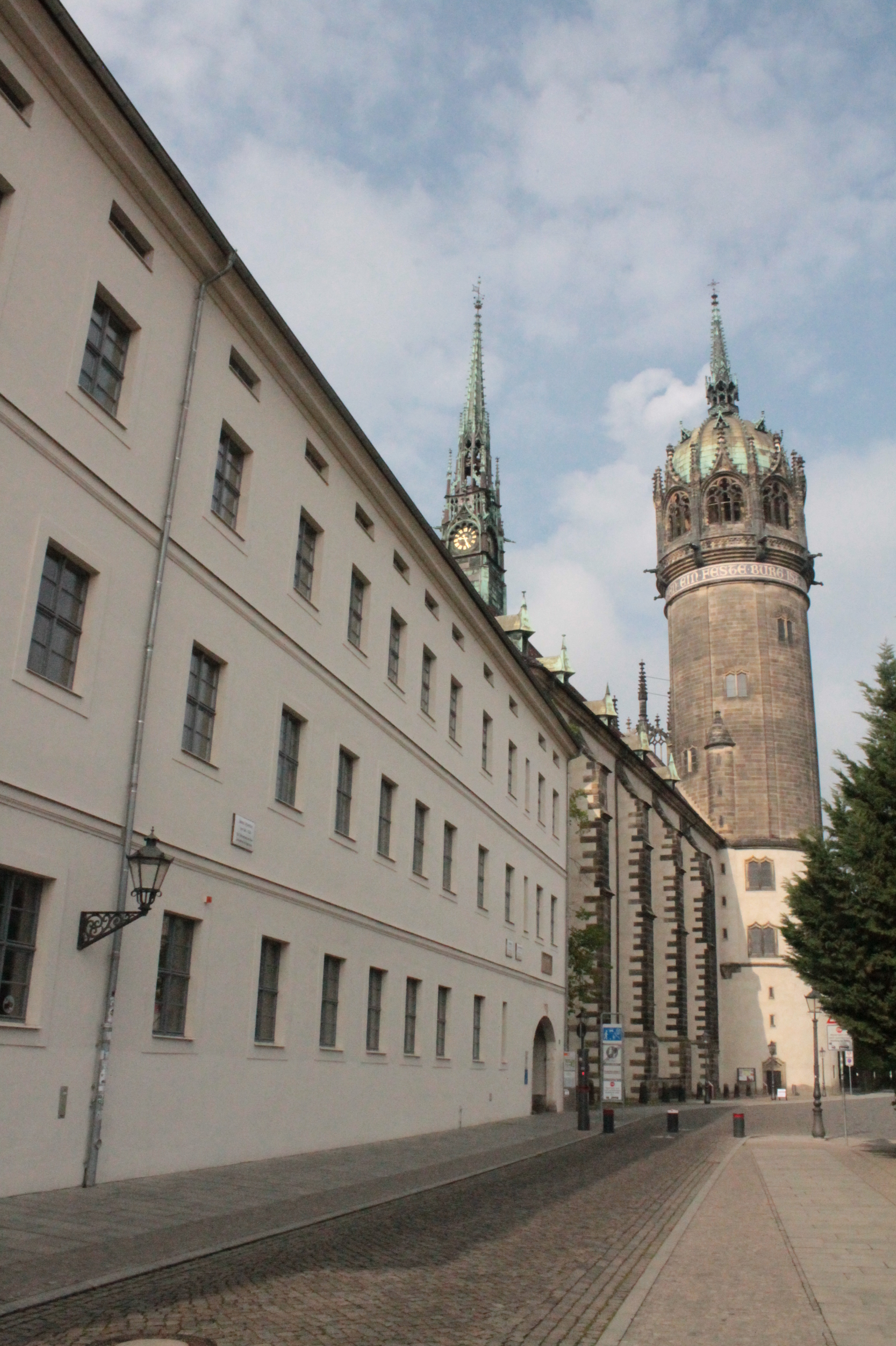
Schlossplatz, Wittenberg

Georg(e) Spalatin (German: [ˈʃpaːlatiːn]) was the pseudonym taken by Georg Burkhardt (German: [ˈɡeːɔʁk ˈbʊʁkhaʁt]; 17 January 1484 – 16 January 1545), a German humanist, theologian, reformer, secretary of the Saxon Elector Frederick the Wise, as well as an important figure in the history of the Reformation.

== Biography ==
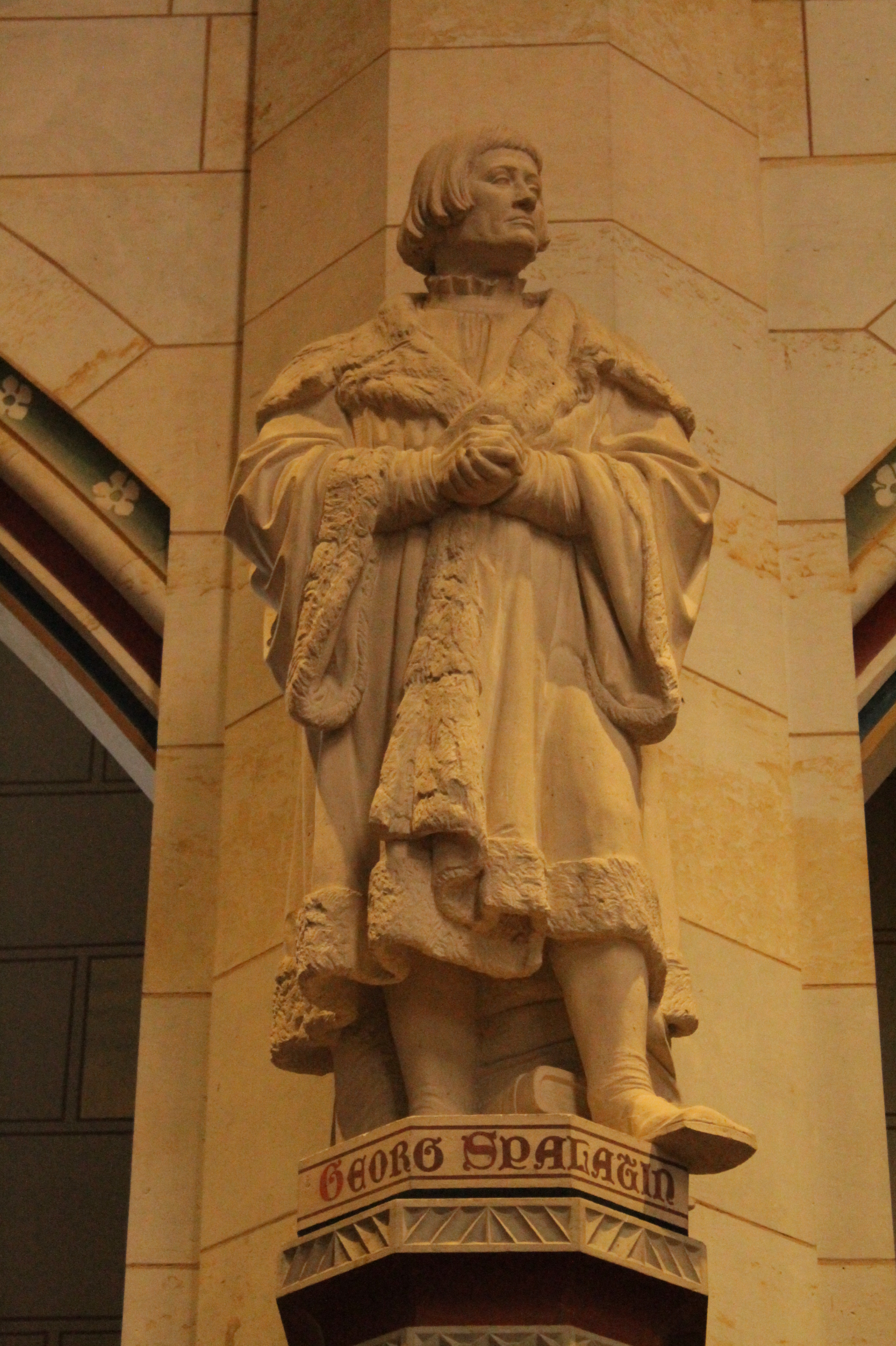
Statue of Georg Spalatin, Schlosskirche, Wittenberg

Burkhardt was born at Spalt (from which he took the Latinized name "Spalatinus"), near Nuremberg, where his father was a tanner. He went to Nuremberg for his education when he was thirteen years of age, and soon afterward to the University of Erfurt, he received his bachelor's degree in 1499. There he attracted the notice of Nikolaus Marschalk, the university's most influential professor, who made Spalatin his amanuensis and took him to the new University of Wittenberg in 1502. There he lived in quarters on the Schlossplatz just east of Schlosskirche, Wittenberg.

In 1505 Spalatin returned to Erfurt to study jurisprudence. He was recommended to Conrad Mutianus and was welcomed by the German humanists of whom Mutianus was chief. His friend acquired a post for him as a teacher of novices in the monastery at Georgenthal, and in 1508 he was ordained priest by Bishop Johann von Laasphe, who had ordained Martin Luther. In 1509 Mutianus recommended him to Frederick III the Wise, the Elector of Saxony, who sent him back to Wittenberg in 1511 to act as tutor to his nephews, including the future elector John Frederick.

Spalatin speedily gained Frederick's confidence and was rewarded with a canon's stall in Altenburg. In 1512 the elector made him his librarian. He was also promoted to be court chaplain and secretary and took charge of all the elector's private and public correspondence. His solid scholarship, and especially his unusual mastery of Greek, made him indispensable to the Saxon court.

Spalatin had never cared for theology, and, although a priest and a preacher, had been a humanist. How he first became acquainted with Luther is unknown — probably at Wittenberg — but the reformer became his chief counselor in all moral and religious matters. His letters to Luther have been lost, but the answers remain. He read Luther's writings to the elector and translated for his benefit those in Latin into German.

Spalatin accompanied Frederick to the Diet of Augsburg in 1518, and shared in the negotiations with the papal legates, Thomas Cajetan and Karl von Miltitz. He was with the elector when Charles V was chosen emperor and crowned and at the Diet of Worms, through all the troubled diplomacy of the earlier years of the Reformation. Spalatin dissuaded Luther repeatedly from publishing books or engaging in overt acts against the papacy, but was ready to translate the books or justify the acts when they were done.

On the death of Frederick in 1525, Spalatin left the Saxon court but continued to attend the imperial diets and became an advisor to John and John Frederick. He went into the residence as a canon at Altenburg and incited the chapter to institute reforms, somewhat unsuccessfully. He married in the same year.

During the later portion of his life, from 1526 onwards, Spalatin was chiefly engaged in the visitation of churches and schools in the Electorate of Saxony, reporting on the confiscation and application of ecclesiastical revenues, and he was asked to undertake the same work for Albertine Saxony. He was also a permanent visitor of Wittenberg University. Shortly before his death, he fell into a state of profound melancholy and died at Altenburg. He was buried in the vault of the St. Bartholomew church.

== Works ==
A list of Spalatin's works, published and unpublished, may be found in Adolf Seelheim's Georg Spalatin als sächsischer Historiograph (1876). They include:

- Annales Reformationis oder Jahrbücher von der Reformation Lutheri, edited by E. S. Cyprian (Leipzig, 1718)
- "Das Leben and die Zeitgeschichte Friedrichs des Weisen," published in Georg Spalatins Historischer Nachlass and Briefe, edited by Christian Gotthold Neudecker and Ludwig Preller (Jena, 1851)
- The Spalatin Chronik, or The Chronicle of Saxony and Thuringia, was produced in about 1510 for Frederick III, and includes more than 1000 miniature paintings from the workshop of Lucas Cranach
