= All Saints' Church, Wittenberg =

Coordinates: 51°51′59″N 12°38′16″E

All Saints' Church
- Schlosskirche (German)
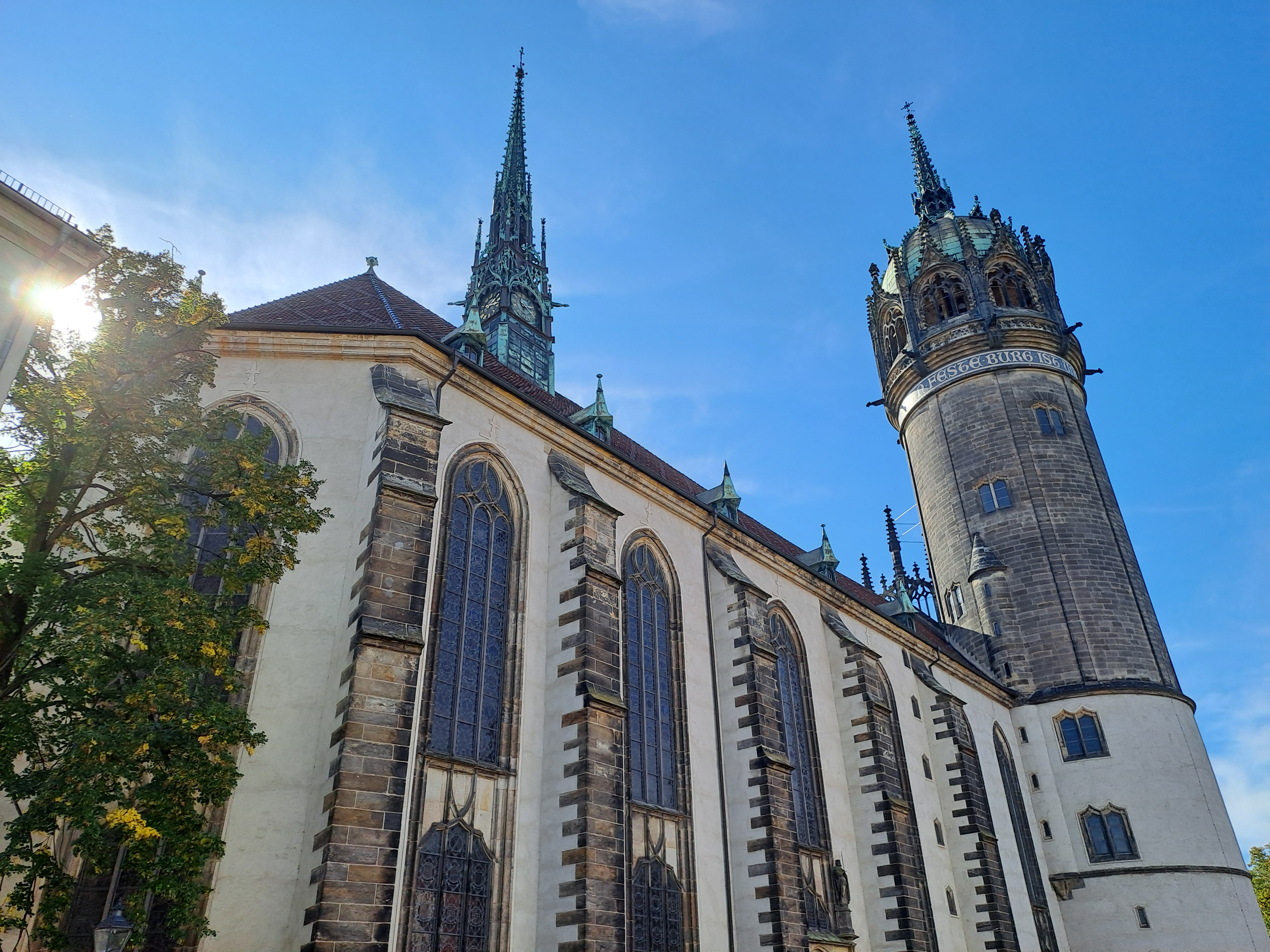
- A north view of the Schlosskirche
- All Saints' Church
- Location: Wittenberg, Saxony-Anhalt
- Country: Germany
- Denomination: Lutheran
- Previous denomination: Roman Catholic
- Website: schlosskirche-wittenberg.de/

History
- Founder: Frederick III, Elector of Saxony
- Dedication: All Saints
- Consecrated: 17 January 1503

Architecture
- Architect: Conrad Pflüger
- Style: Late Gothic
- Groundbreaking: 1490
- Completed: 1511; 515 years ago
- Location within Saxony-Anhalt Location within Germany

UNESCO World Heritage Site
- Part of: Luther Memorials in Eisleben and Wittenberg
- Criteria: Cultural: (iv)(vi)
- Reference: 783-001
- Inscription: 1996 (20th Session)
- Area: 0.16 ha (17,000 sq ft)
- Buffer zone: 4.58 ha (493,000 sq ft)

All Saints' Church, commonly referred to as Schlosskirche (Castle Church) to distinguish it from the Stadtkirche (Town Church) of St. Mary's, sometimes known as the Reformation Memorial Church, is a Lutheran church in Wittenberg, Saxony-Anhalt, Germany. It is the site where, according to Philip Melanchthon, the Ninety-five Theses were posted by Martin Luther in 1517, launching the beginning of the Protestant Reformation.

Beginning in 1883, the church was restored as a memorial site and re-inaugurated on 31 October 1892, 375 years after Luther's posting. Because of its religious significance and testimony to the lasting global effects of the Reformation, the church was inscribed on the UNESCO World Heritage List in 1996 along with other sites in Wittenberg and Eisleben associated with Martin Luther and Philip Melanchthon.

== History ==
A first chapel dedicated to All Saints was erected at the new residence of the Ascanian duke Rudolf I of Saxe-Wittenberg in about 1340. Consecrated on 6 May 1346, Rudolf subordinated his foundation to the immediate jurisdiction of the Holy See. With further donations made by his successor Duke Rudolf II, it was determined the Wittenberg main church by Pope Boniface IX in 1400.

=== Foundation ===
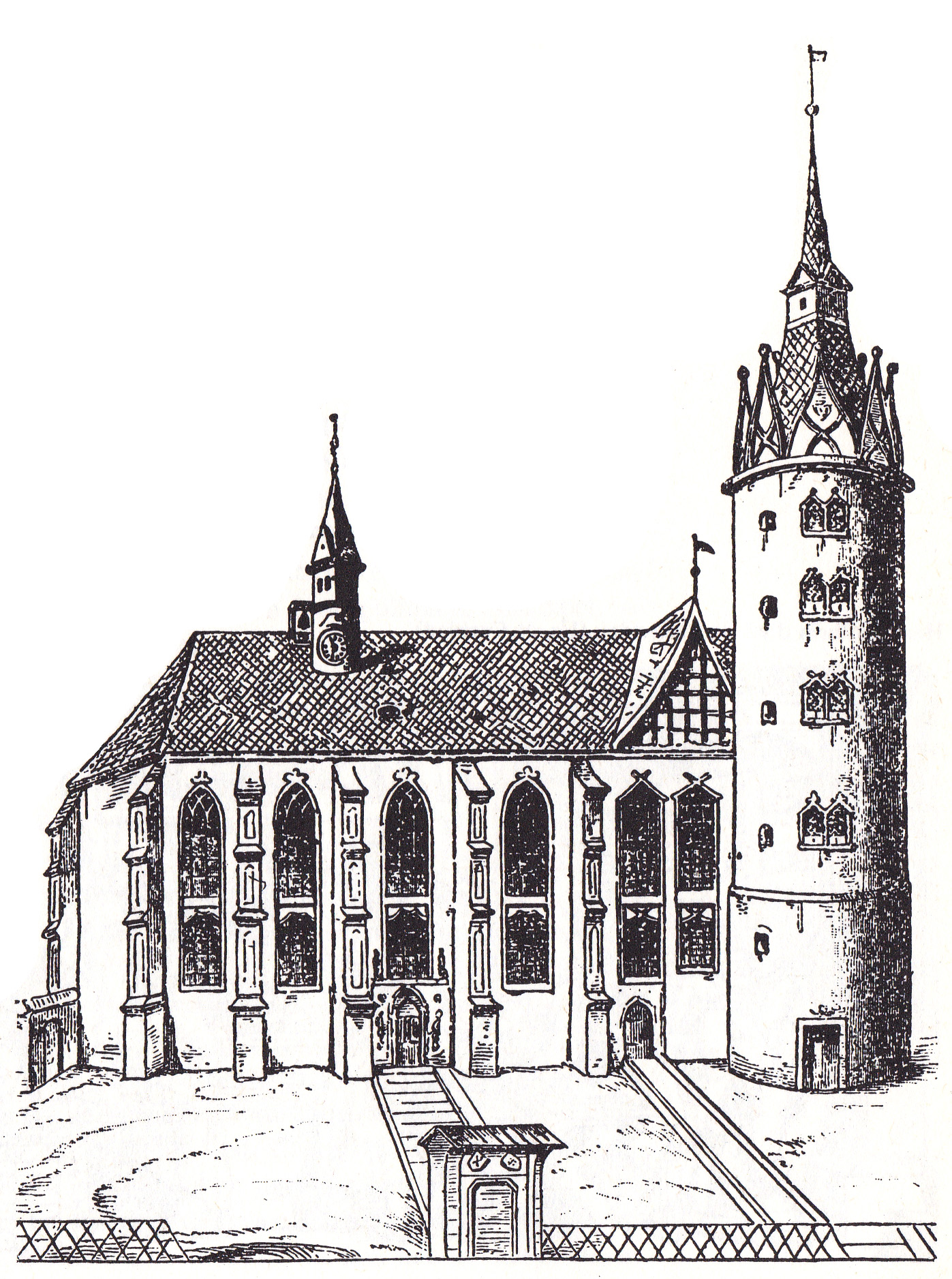
Illustration of Wittenberg Castle Church by Lucas Cranach the Elder in 1509

When in the late 15th century the Wettin prince Frederick III the Wise, elector of Saxony from 1486, had the former Ascanian fortress rebuilt, a new All Saints' Church was designed by the architect Conrad Pflüger (c. 1450 – 1506/07) and erected between 1490 and 1511 in the Late Gothic style. Consecrated on 17 January 1503, it became part of Frederick's electoral castle or Residenzschloss, also called Schloss Wittenberg. Extensive furnishings by Tilman Riemenschneider, Jacopo de' Barbari, and Albrecht Dürer contributed to the construction of the castle complex and then the church.

After, in 1502, Elector Frederick III founded the University of Wittenberg (Leucorea) and received confirmation by the papal legate Raymond Peraudi 1507, All Saints' was incorporated to serve as a chapel to the university and it quickly evolved into an important academic and worship center. Students were awarded their doctorates there, and the reformer Philipp Melanchthon made his famous inaugural speech at the church. A tradition of burying academic dignitaries of the university at the church developed. Several notable epitaphs are preserved up to today.

=== Theses Doors ===
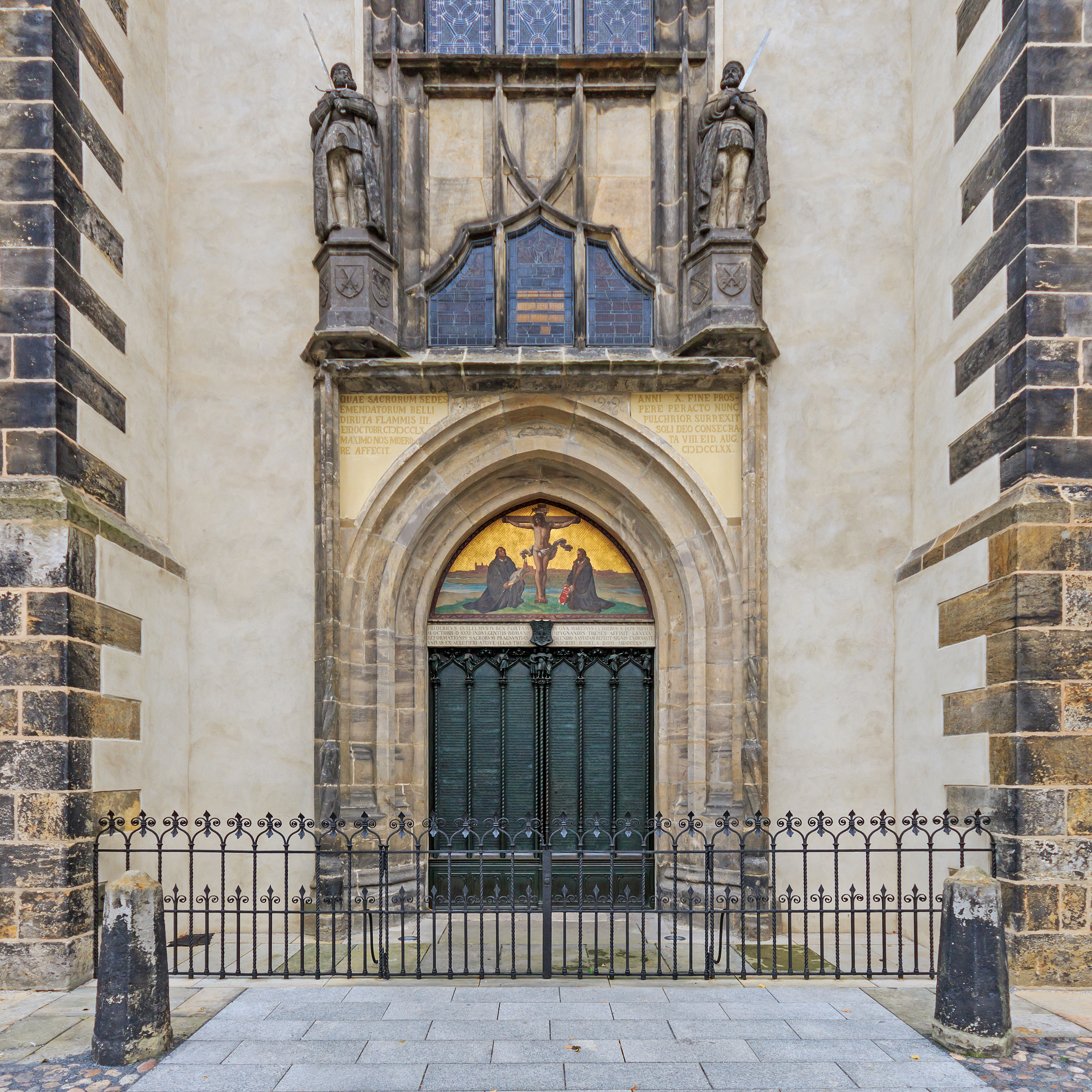
"Theses Doors", commemorating Luther's Ninety-five Theses, were installed on Luther's 375th birthday in 1858.

The main portal was often used by the university staff to pin up messages and notices; it is generally believed that on 31 October 1517, the eve of All Saints' Day, Martin Luther posted his Ninety-five Theses on the doors of All Saints' Church. This act, meant to promote a disputation on the sale of indulgences, is commonly viewed to be a catalyst for the Protestant Reformation. Whether the event actually took place or not, however, cannot be conclusively established. Nevertheless, Luther sent his objections in a letter to Archbishop Albert of Mainz on the same day.

Frederick the Wise died in 1525 and was buried in the Castle Church. In the same year, the Lutheran rite was implemented. The church became the burial site of Martin Luther himself in 1546, and of Philipp Melanchthon in 1560.

When during the Seven Years' War the Wittenberg fortress was occupied by the Prussian Army and shelled by Imperial forces in 1760, the Castle Church was destroyed by a fire resulting from the bombardment. The blaze left only half of the foundation standing, and none of the wooden portals survived. All Saints' was soon rebuilt, albeit without many priceless works of art that were lost forever.

After Wittenberg was incorporated into the Prussian Province of Saxony, King Frederick William IV, in 1858, ordered commemorative bronze doors to be mounted onto the jambs where the original wooden ones had been located. On the doors the Theses are inscribed in their original Latin form. The doors themselves weigh 2,200 pounds (1,000 kg), with ornaments modelled by Friedrich Drake. On 10 November 1858, 375 years after Martin Luther's birth, the new doors were commemorated at a formal ceremony. Above the doors is a tympanum crucifixion painting that portrays Luther on the left with his German Bible translation, and Philipp Melanchthon on the right, with the 1530 Augsburg Confession, the main confession of faith in the Lutheran Church which was formed by Luther and Melanchthon. These doors are among the most photographed in Europe.

=== Renovation ===
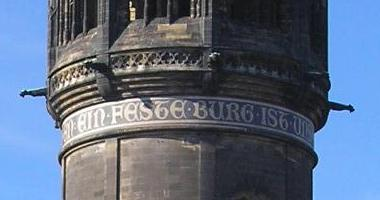
"Ein feste Burg ist unser Gott", the inscription on the church tower

On the occasion of the fourth centenary of Luther's birth in 1883, an extensive restoration of All Saints' in a Neo-Gothic style was begun under the supervision of the Prussian architect Friedrich Adler by his disciple Paul Ferdinand Groth (1859–1955). The interior redesign included the present rib vault ceiling and pilasters, as well as matronea and the apse. Also, the 88-metre (289 ft)-tall steeple was rebuilt, from which one can obtain a good view of the city of Wittenberg and the surrounding countryside. A quote, "Ein feste Burg ist unser Gott" ("A Mighty Fortress Is Our God"), from one of Luther's hymns, encircles the tower.

On 31 October 1892, 375 years after Luther posted his 95 Theses on the doors of the church, All Saints' was re-inaugurated.

== All Saints' today ==
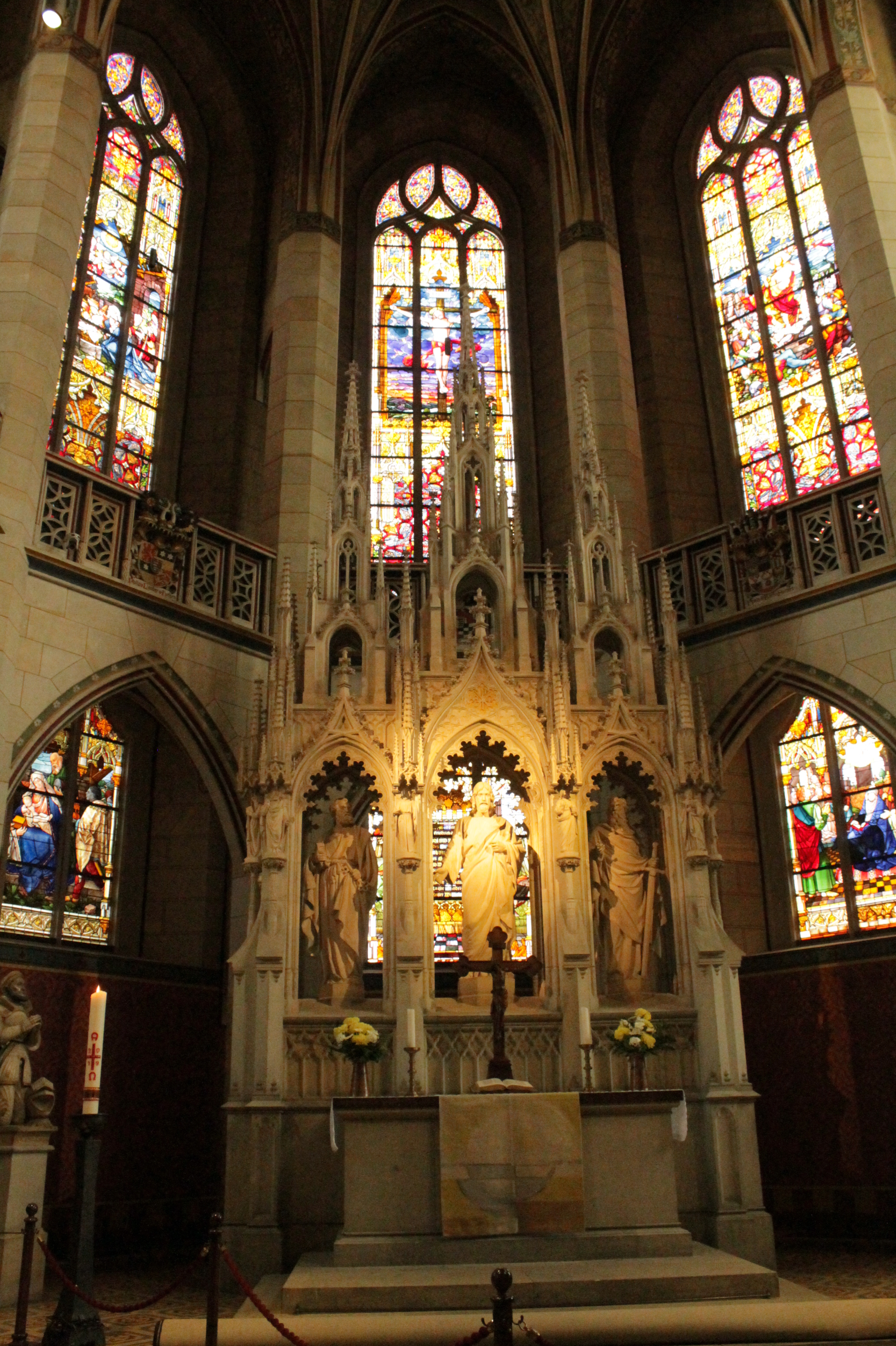
Altarpiece and east windows at All Saints' Church in Wittenberg

A Lutheran Castle Church parish was established in 1949. It later evolved to a centre of the East German peace movement (swords into ploughshares), when Friedrich Schorlemmer served here as a preacher from 1978 onwards. In 1983, 500 years after the birth of Luther, 12 new stained glass windows were installed in All Saints'. These honored the most important Reformation students of Luther, and were created by Renate Brömme in a "timeless" style at the order of the Lutheran World Federation. A new glazed brick roof was added in 1999–2000.

Today, All Saints' Church serves not only as a place of worship, but it also houses the town's historical archives, is home to the Riemer-Museum, and a youth hostel. In view of the five-hundredth anniversary of Luther's Theses, the building has again undergone extensive renovation. The church was festively reopened on 2 October 2016 in the presence of President Joachim Gauck and Margrethe II of Denmark, who dedicated an altar frontal designed by herself.

== Tombs and artwork ==
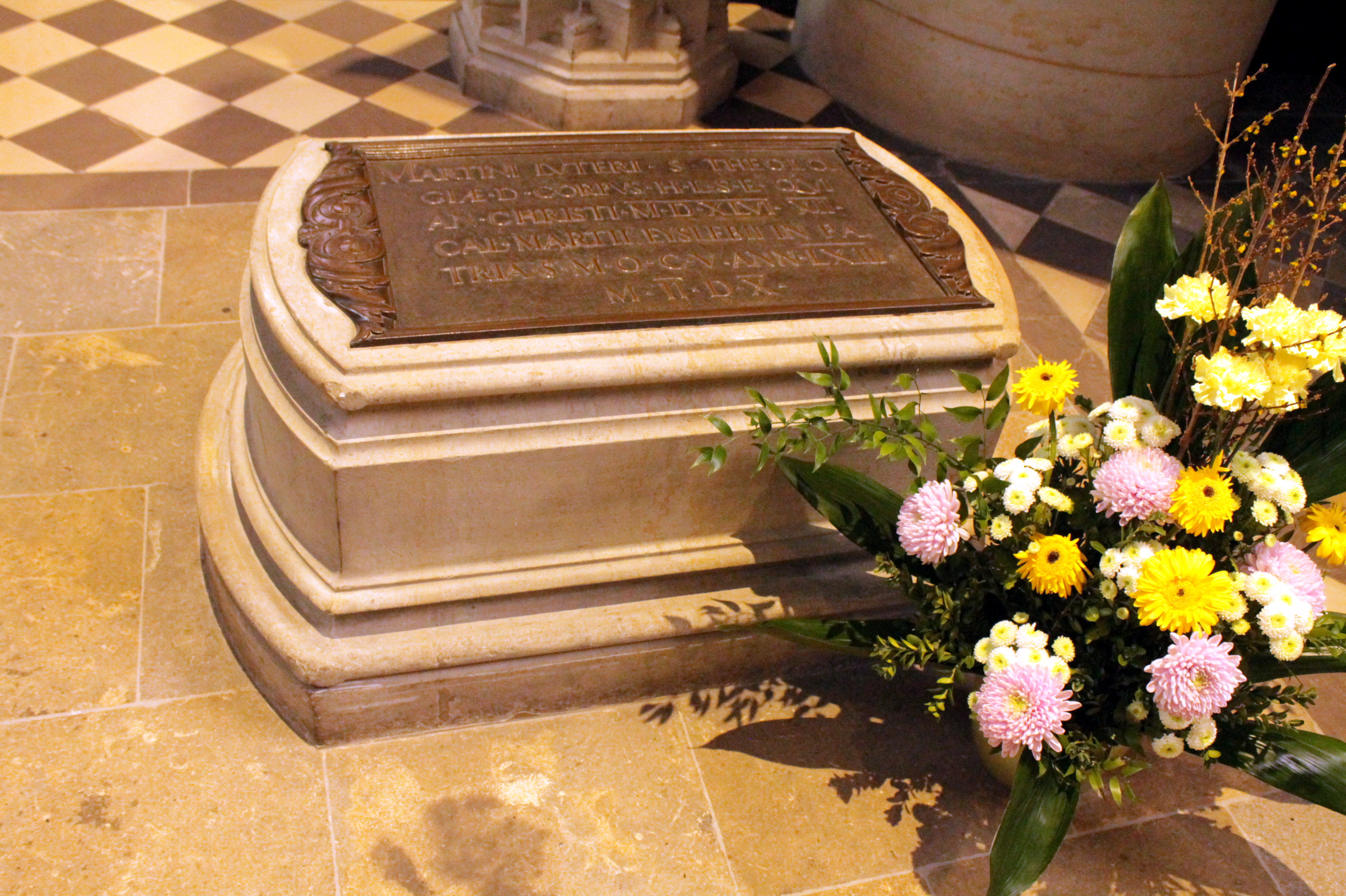
Martin Luther's grave at All Saints' Church in Wittenberg

The tombs of Martin Luther and Philip Melanchthon are located in All Saints' Church. On Luther's tomb, located beneath the pulpit, is inscribed "Here is buried the body of the Doctor of Sacred Theology, Martin Luther, who died in the year of Christ 1546, on February 18th, in his hometown Eisleben, after having lived for 63 years, 2 months, and 10 days." Melanchthon preached at Luther's burial. Luther's casket is buried near the pulpit, some 2.4 metres below the floor of the nave. Other notable burials include Caspar Ziegler, a Rektor of the university.

The church holds life-sized statues made from alabaster of Frederick III and his brother Elector John of Saxony, and several bronze sculptures, also of Frederick III and of John which are done by Peter Vischer the Younger and Hans Vischer. The church has many paintings done by both Lucas Cranach the Younger and Lucas Cranach the Elder.

Full-sized statues which flank the nave include the many main figures of the Reformation: Nicolaus von Amsdorf, Caspar Cruciger, Johann Brenz, Urbanus Rhegius, Justus Jonas, Georg Spalatin, Johannes Bugenhagen, Philip Melanchthon and Martin Luther.

== Gallery ==
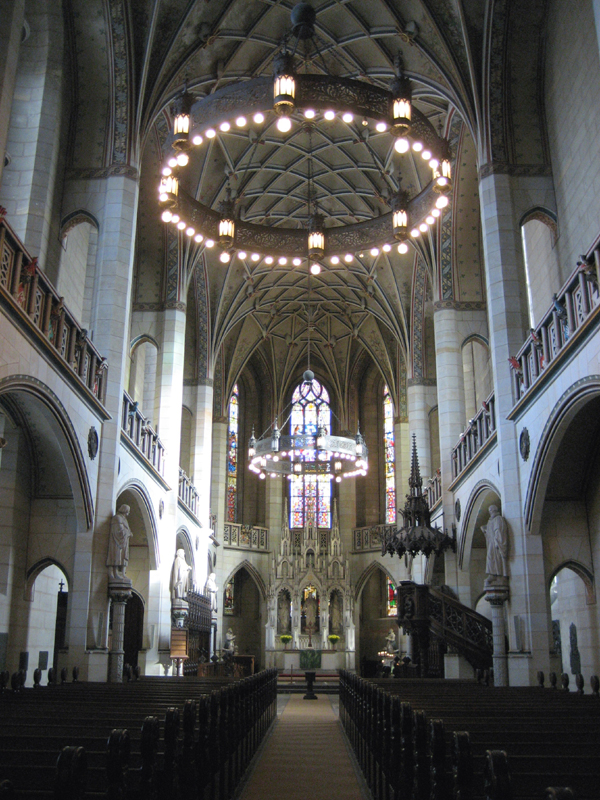
Interior: view down the nave towards the altar

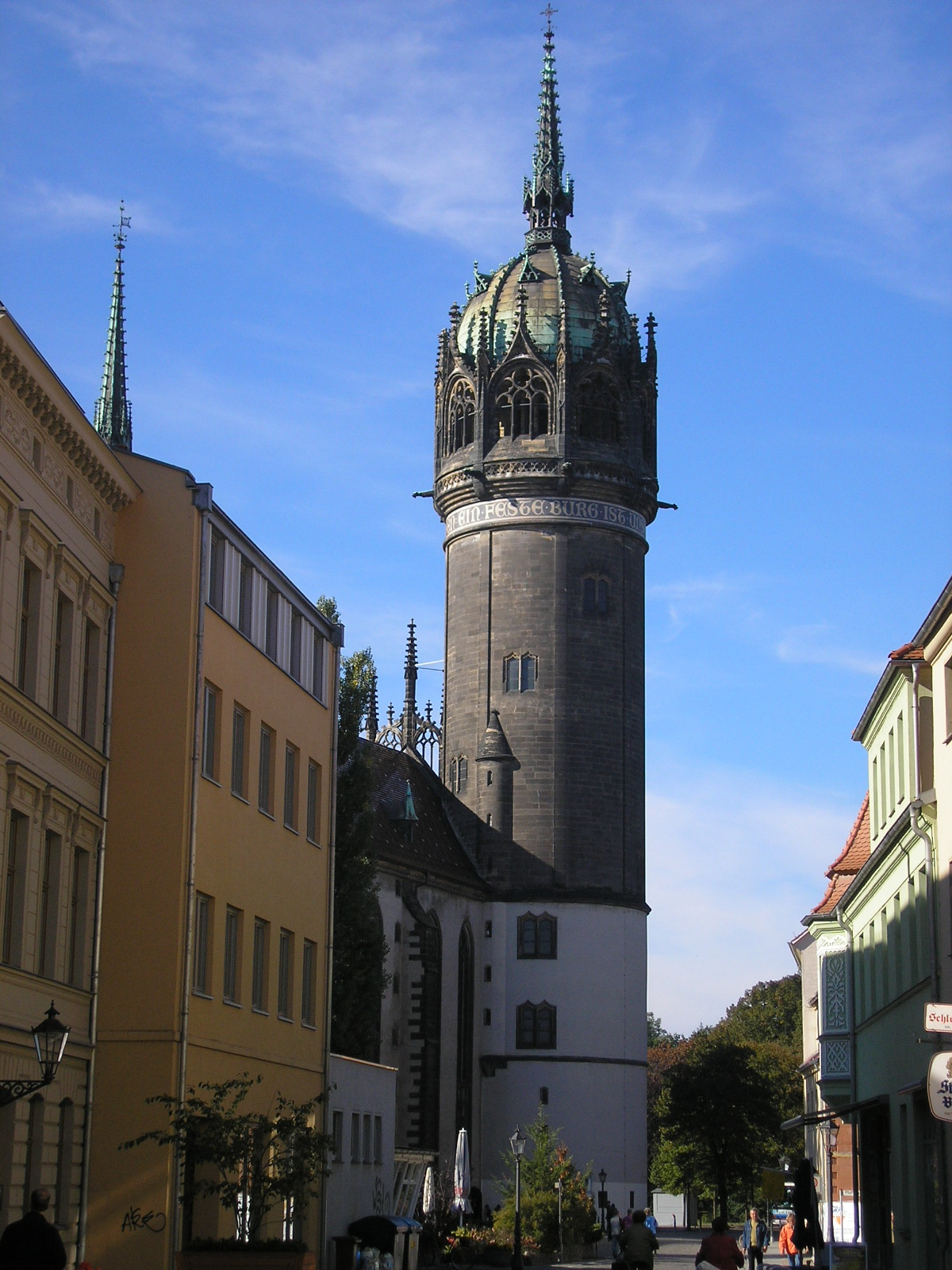
The steeple of All Saints' Church. The inscription Ein' feste Burg ist unser Gott runs just below its base.

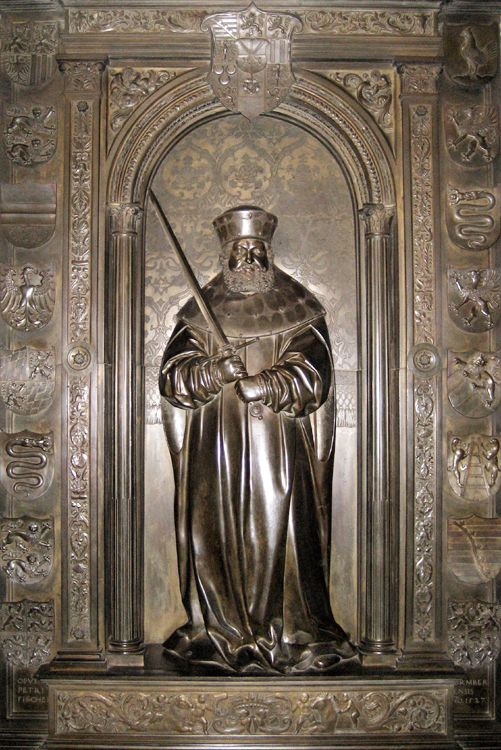
Statue of Frederick III, "the Wise", elector of Saxony

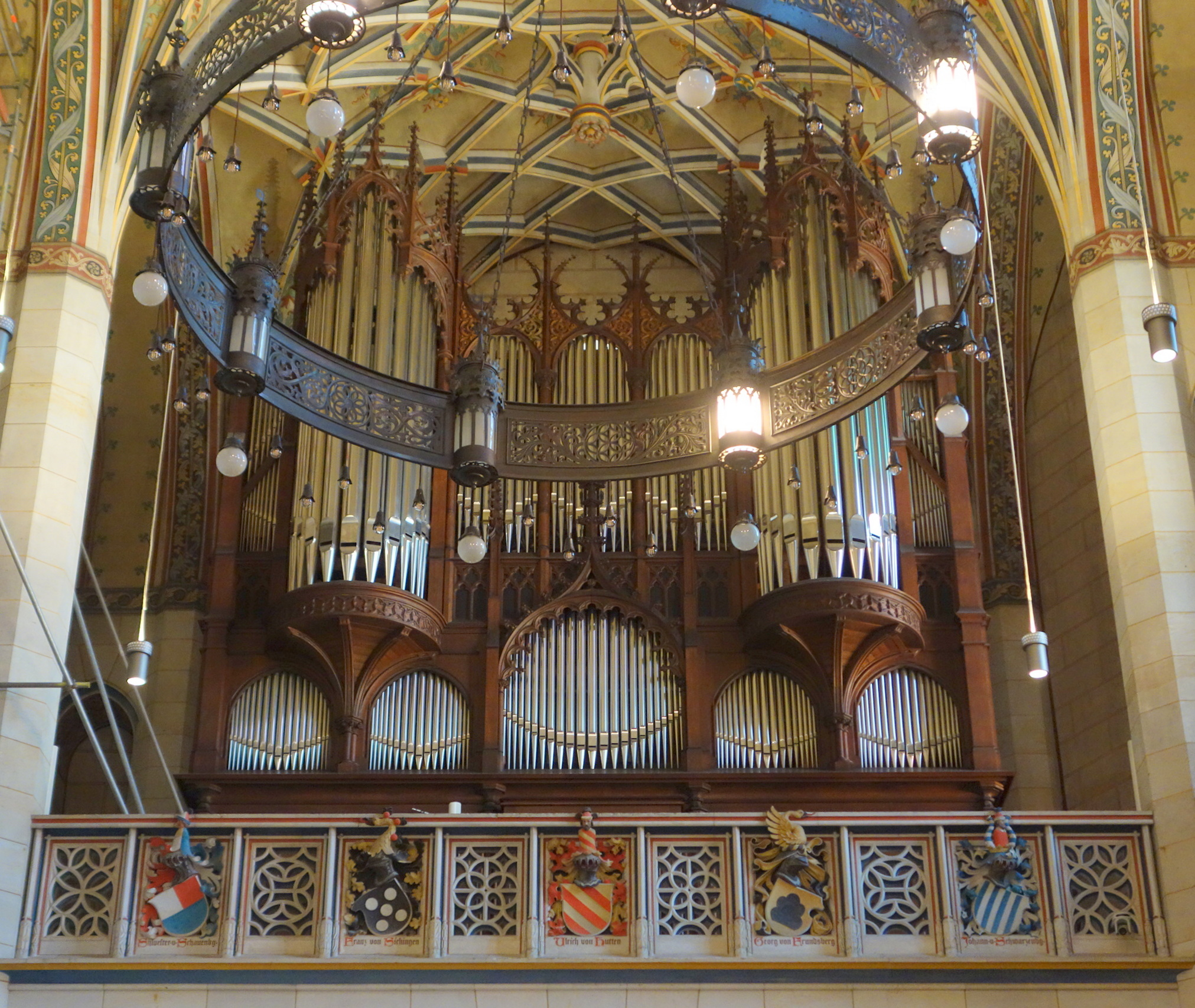
Organ

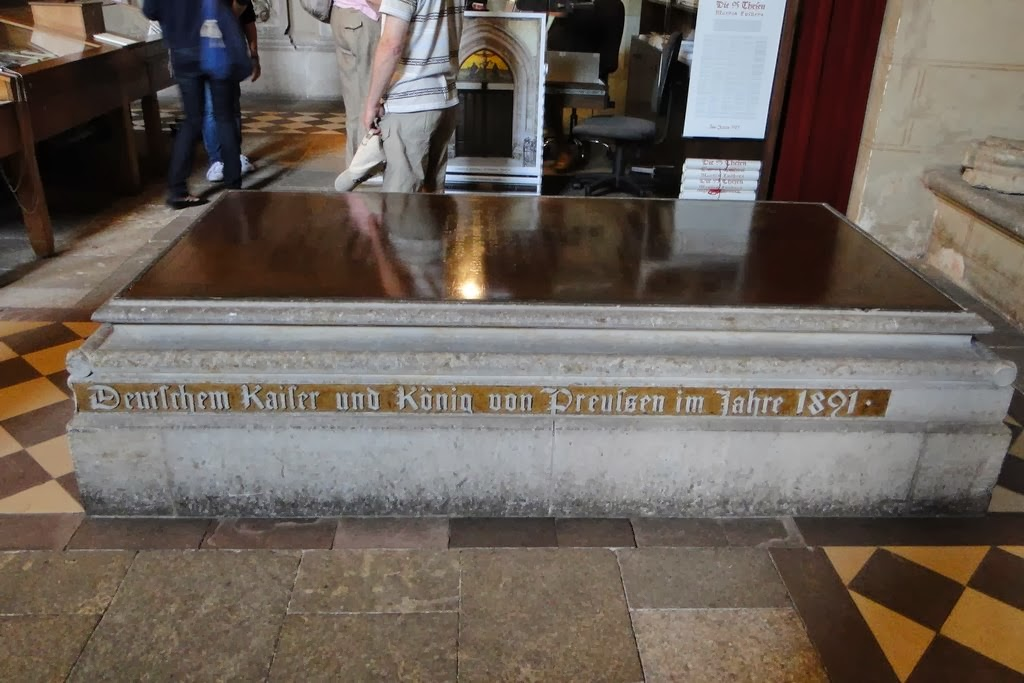
Memorial to Prussian princes

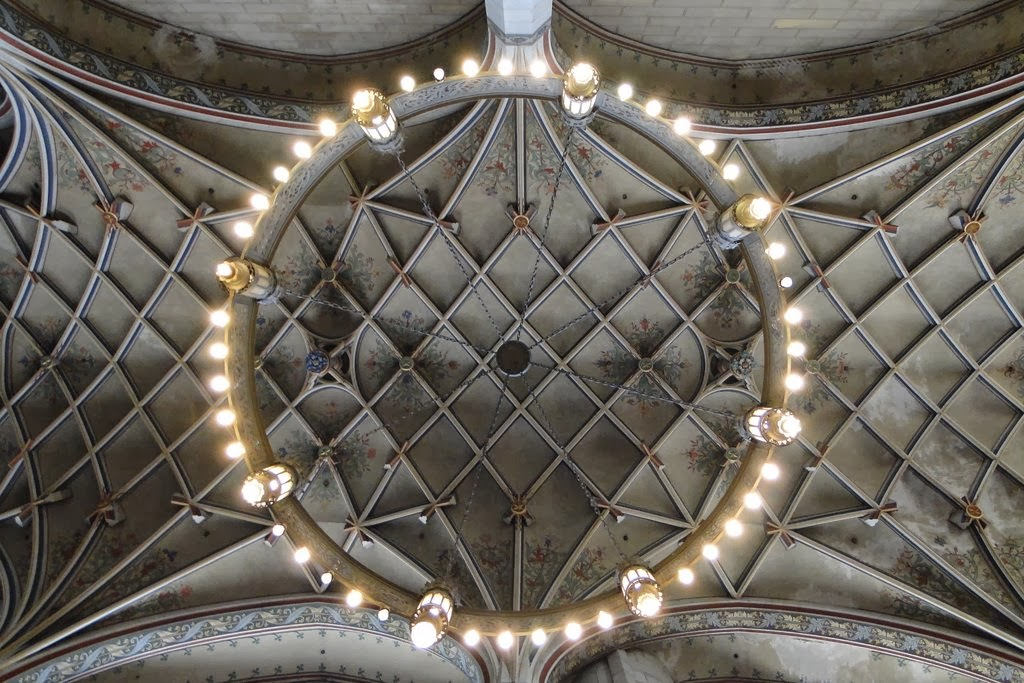
Chandelier
