= Caspar Cruciger the Younger =

German theologian

Caspar Cruciger the Younger (19 March 1525 – 16 April 1597) was a German theologian and Protestant reformer.

Born in Wittenberg, he was the son of Caspar Cruciger the Elder and his wife, the hymnwriter and former nun Elisabeth von Meseritz. He was Melanchthon's successor at the University of Wittenberg. In the discussions after 1570 he was one of the leaders of the Philippists, and was engulfed in their catastrophe in 1574. He was imprisoned and was banished from Saxony in 1576.

After a short residence with the count of Nassau at Dillenburg he went to Hesse, and died as pastor and president of the consistory at Kassel.
