= Gabriel Zwilling =

German Protestant Reformer (c. 1487 – 1558)

- Born: 1487
- Died: 1 May 1558 (aged 70–71); Torgau
- Other names: Gabriel Didymus
- Occupations: Lutheran and Protestant Reformer

Gabriel Zwilling, also known as Gabriel Didymus (c. 1487 – 1 May 1558), was a German Lutheran and Protestant Reformer born near Annaberg, Electorate of Saxony.

== Education and work ==
Zwilling was educated in Wittenberg and Erfurt. He, like Martin Luther, was a member of the Augustinian order, which he left in 1521.

Zwilling became prominent in the Wittenberg Movement in mid-1521, when Luther was secured in the Wartburg after the Diet of Worms. Along with Andreas Karlstadt, Zwilling guided the Wittenberg movement in a more radical direction. In following the teachings of Luther and Karlstadt, he stopped holding private masses, and ordered other Augustinian monks to do the same. In January 1522 Zwilling participated in iconoclasm in Wittenberg. He led monks of the Augustinian order in a mass exodus from the monastery, removing and destroying any pictures and statues as they left. He taught that it was wrong to withhold the full eucharist from the common people and that they did not have to go to confession to participate in mass.

When Luther returned to Wittenberg and regained control in March 1522, Zwilling publicly admitted his errors, and gave his support to Luther's more conservative vision of reform. He became a prediger (“preacher”) in Altenburg in 1522, and moved to Torgau in 1523 where he became successively prediger, pastor (1525), and superintendent (1529).

== Personal life ==
Zwilling married the widow of the former councilor and chancellor of Frederick III, Hieronymus Rudelauf (about 1450–1523) from Frankenberg. The couple had a son, Paul Zwilling (1547–81). He was removed from his final office because he opposed the Leipzig Interim of 1549. Zwilling died in Torgau.
