= Caspar Creuziger =

German humanist Protestant (1504–1548)

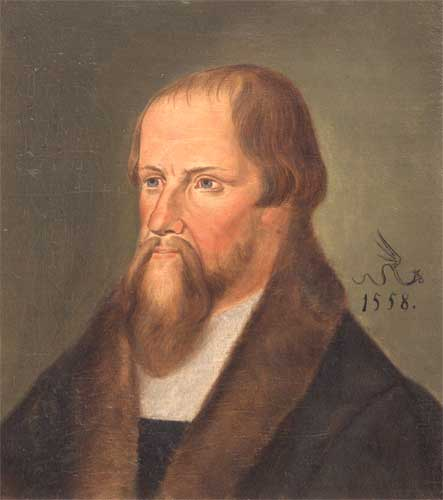
Caspar Creuziger, portrayed by Lucas Cranach the Younger.

Caspar Creuziger, also known as Caspar Cruciger the Elder (1 January 1504 – 16 November 1548), was a German Renaissance humanist and Protestant reformer. He was professor of Theology at the University of Wittenberg, preacher at the Castle Church (Wittenberg, Germany), secretary to and worked with Martin Luther to revise Luther's German Bible translation.

== Life ==
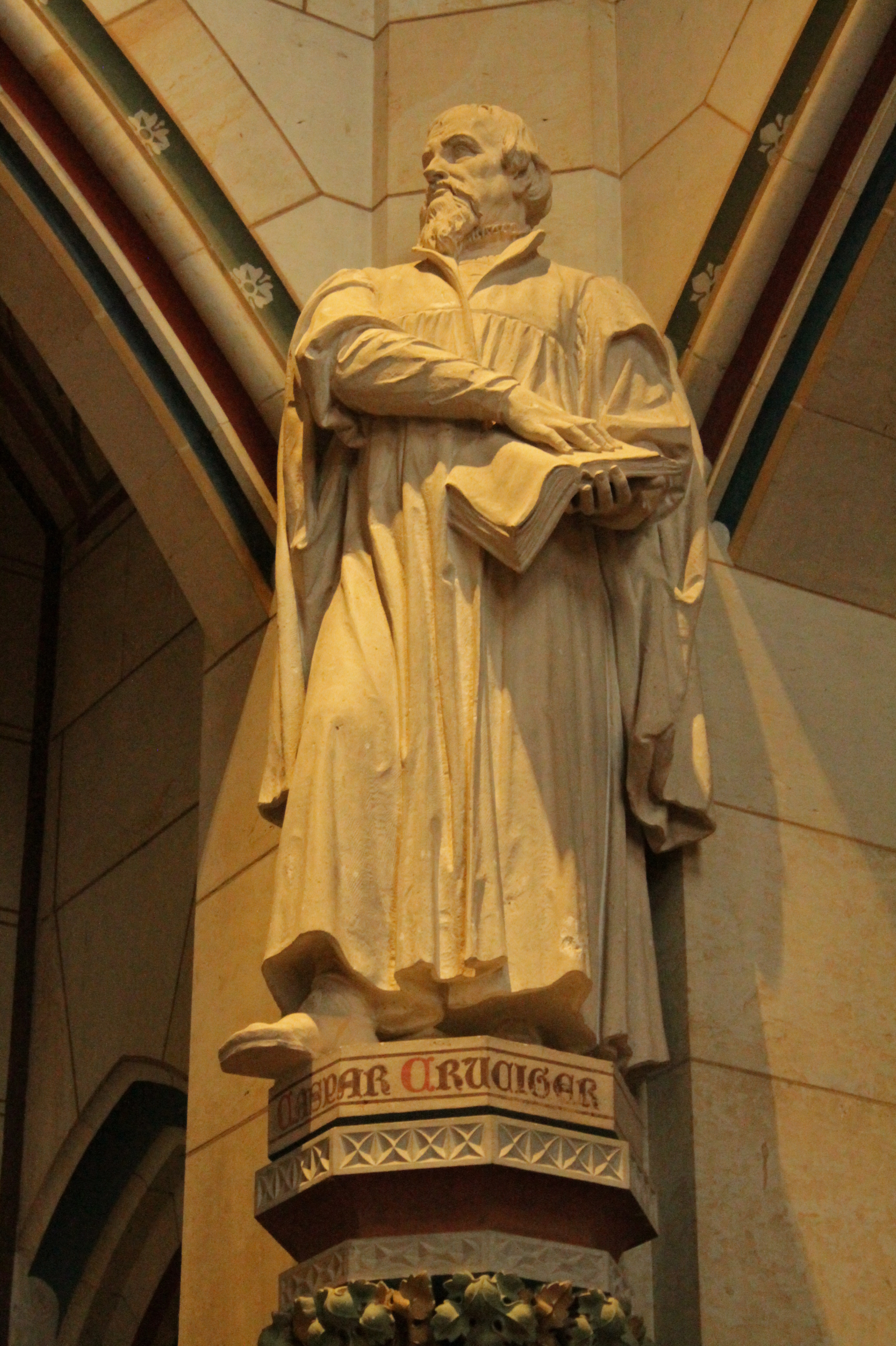
Statue of Caspar Cruciger, Schlosskirche, Wittenberg

Born in Leipzig, Creuziger entered the University of Leipzig at age 12, where he studied under Peter Mosellanus. The outbreak of the plague drove him to Wittenberg in 1521, where he completed his studies in the Hebrew language.

In 1525, he became Rector at Magdeburg's Johannisschule. He was called to the faculties of Philosophy and Theology at Wittenberg in 1528, where he lectured in both disciplines, preached at the Castle Church and wrote faculty opinions. He received his doctorate from Wittenberg in 1533. He continued to teach exegesis, dogmatics and edited instructional materials. During these years, Martin Luther included him in the reformer's circle of translators, who assisted him in revising the German Bible version.

In 1539, Creuziger assisted Leipzig in introducing reforms. He served as a delegate to theological convocations at Hagenau, Worms and Regensburg. When other theologians fled the Schmalkald War, he remained at his post.

Creuziger also edited the Wittenberg edition of Luther's Works and helped to draft the Leipzig Interim.

He died at Wittenberg in 1548.

== Family ==
In 1524 he married the former nun Elisabeth von Meseritz - they had one daughter (Elisabeth, who married rector Kegel and then, on his death, Luther's son Hans in Eisleben) and one son (Caspar Cruciger the Younger).

== Bibliography ==
- In epistolam Pauli ad Timotheum priorem Commentarius
- Enarratio Psalmi 116–118
- Der XX. Psalm für christliche Herrschaft zu beten
- In Evangelium Johannis Apostoli Enarratio
- Enarratio Psalmi: Dixit Dominus [110] et aliquot sequentium
- Comment. in Matthaeum
- In Epistolam Pauli ad Romanos Commentarius
- De iudiciis piarum Synodorum sententia
- Enarrationis Symboli Nicaeni articuli duo, de Synodis et tribus personis Divinitatis.
