= Martin Zwilling =

American business executive and author (born 1945)

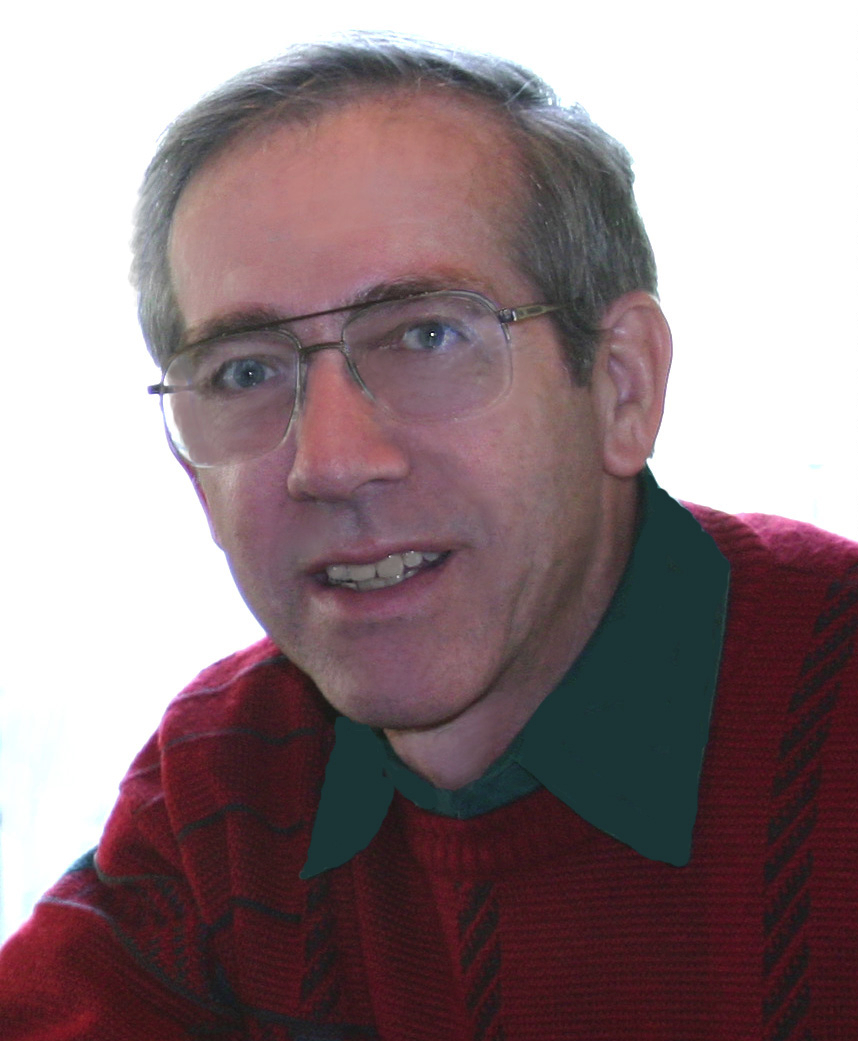
- Born: November 19, 1945 (age 80); Olney, Illinois, U.S.
- Education: University of Illinois
- Occupations: Software Developer, former IBM Executive,
- Years active: 1968–present
- Spouse: Libby Zwilling
- Children: 2
- Website: Martin Zwilling

Martin "Marty" C. Zwilling (born November 19, 1945) is an American business executive, entrepreneur, and author.

== Background ==
Born and raised on his family's farm near Olney, Illinois, Martin Zwilling graduated from the University of Illinois (Champaign/Urbana) in 1967 with a degree in accounting and a minor in computer science.

== Career at IBM ==
From 1967 to 1981, he worked for IBM in various locations, doing field sales and marketing, systems engineering, technical support for mainframe computers and applications design.

From Kansas City, he moved in 1981 to Boca Raton, Florida to join the development team for the IBM Personal Computer division, where he worked directly with Philip Don Estridge. He led the IBM PC DOS development group and managed the relationship with Microsoft during the early 1980s.

Later he moved to the IBM Silicon Valley Lab to manage software development for a series of compiler and testing products. He finished his IBM career in 1997 as Director of a team developing reusable software components with IBM Global Services, Research Triangle Park, Raleigh, North Carolina.

== Angel investing and board membership ==
Zwilling has been a member of two angel investment groups: Arizona Angels and the Arizona Technology Investor Forum (ATIF). He is a board member at Callaman Ventures, an advisor to the Arizona State University Venture Catalyst Program, Executive in Residence at the Thunderbird School of Global Management, and member of the advisory boards for several start-up companies in the area.

== Bibliography ==
He has published over 500 articles on Forbes, The Huffington Post, Young Entrepreneur, Harvard Business Review, his blog, and other online publications

He has published two books, Do You Have What It Takes To Be An Entrepreneur? and Attracting an Angel: How to Get Money From Business Angels and Why Most Entrepreneurs Don't.
