= Seven Sorrows Polyptych =

c. 1500 paintings by Albrecht Dürer

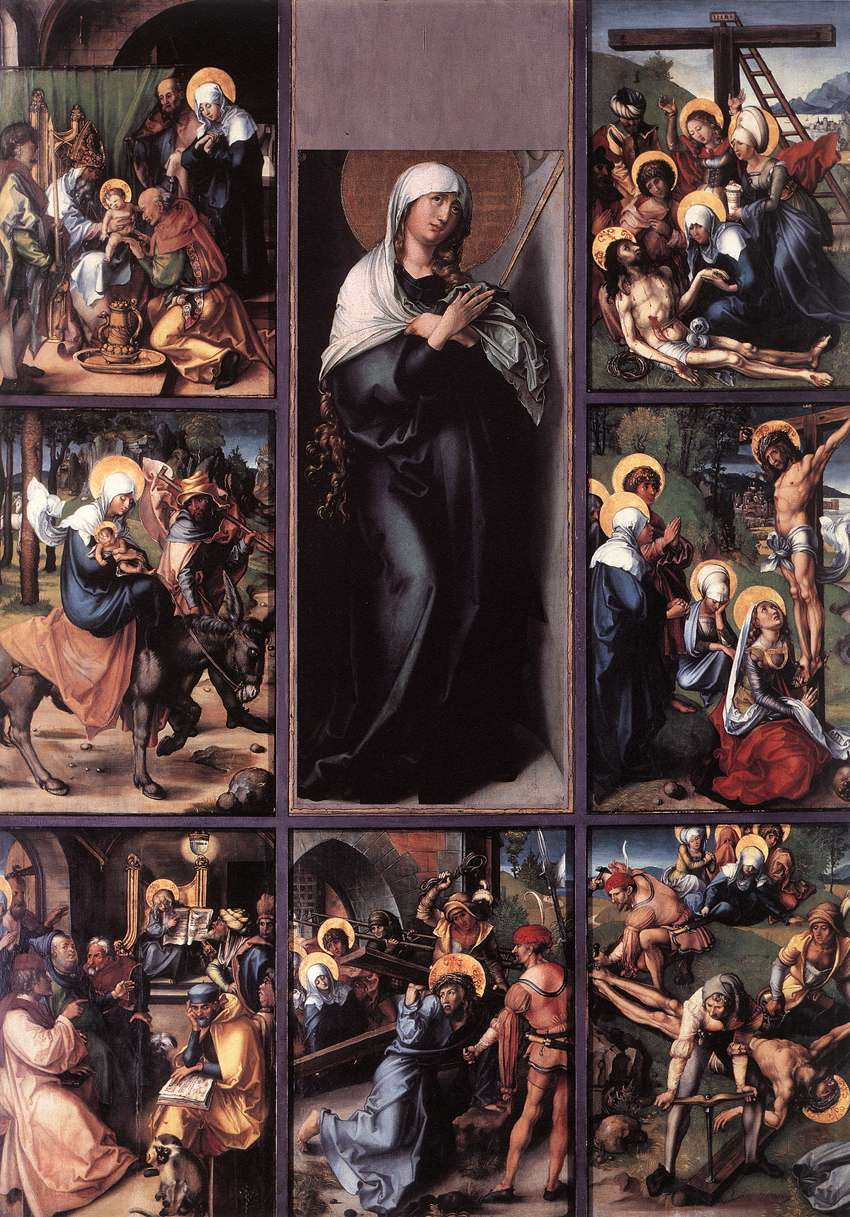
- The original installation is unrecorded; the image is based on the Dresden re-assembly of the seven "sorrows" panels around a space large enough for the central panel, which does not fit exactly
- Artist: Albrecht Dürer
- Year: c. 1500
- Medium: Oil on panel
- Dimensions: 189 cm × 138 cm (74 in × 54 in)
- Location: Alte Pinakothek, Munich, and Gemäldegalerie Alte Meister, Dresden.

The Seven Sorrows Polyptych is a former altarpiece featuring an oil on panel painting measuring 108 x 46 cm by Albrecht Dürer, now in the Alte Pinakothek in Munich. This painting of the Virgin was once the central picture of a polyptych illustrating the Seven Sorrows of the Virgin, but is now in the Alte Pinakothek in Munich. The seven surrounding panels (measuring some 60 x 46 cm) are not firmly attributed to Durer and are exhibited at the Gemäldegalerie Alte Meister of Dresden.

== Description ==
The work was commissioned by Frederick III, Elector of Saxony, not a long time after his meeting with Dürer at Nuremberg in April 1496. Stylistic considerations suggest that the artist started to work on the painting only from around 1500.

Modern scholars tend to attribute to Dürer only the central panel, the others having been executed by his pupils based on his drawings. The central panel, portraying the Sorrowing Mother, arrived in the Bavarian museum from the Benediktbeuren convent of Munich in the early 19th century. It was restored in the 1930s: once the overpaintings and additions were removed, the shell-shaped niche (a motif typical of Italian art), the halo and the sword (a symbol of Mary of the Seven Sorrows) on the right were rediscovered, clarifying the subject of the work.

The other panels were at Wittenberg, seat of Frederick's castle. In 1640 they were moved to the Kunstkammer of the Prince of Saxony. In the mid-20th century they were restored: their conditions improved, but the attribution was not cleared.

#	Image	Subject	#	Image	Subject
1		Circumcision of Jesus	5		Christ is Nailed to the Cross
2		Flight to Egypt	6		Crucifixion of Jesus
3		Christ among the Doctors	7		Deposition of Jesus
4		Via Crucis			

== See also ==
- List of paintings by Albrecht Dürer
- Polyptych
