= Frederick III of Saxony =

Elector of Saxony from 1486 to 1525

Frederick III
- Landgrave of Thuringia
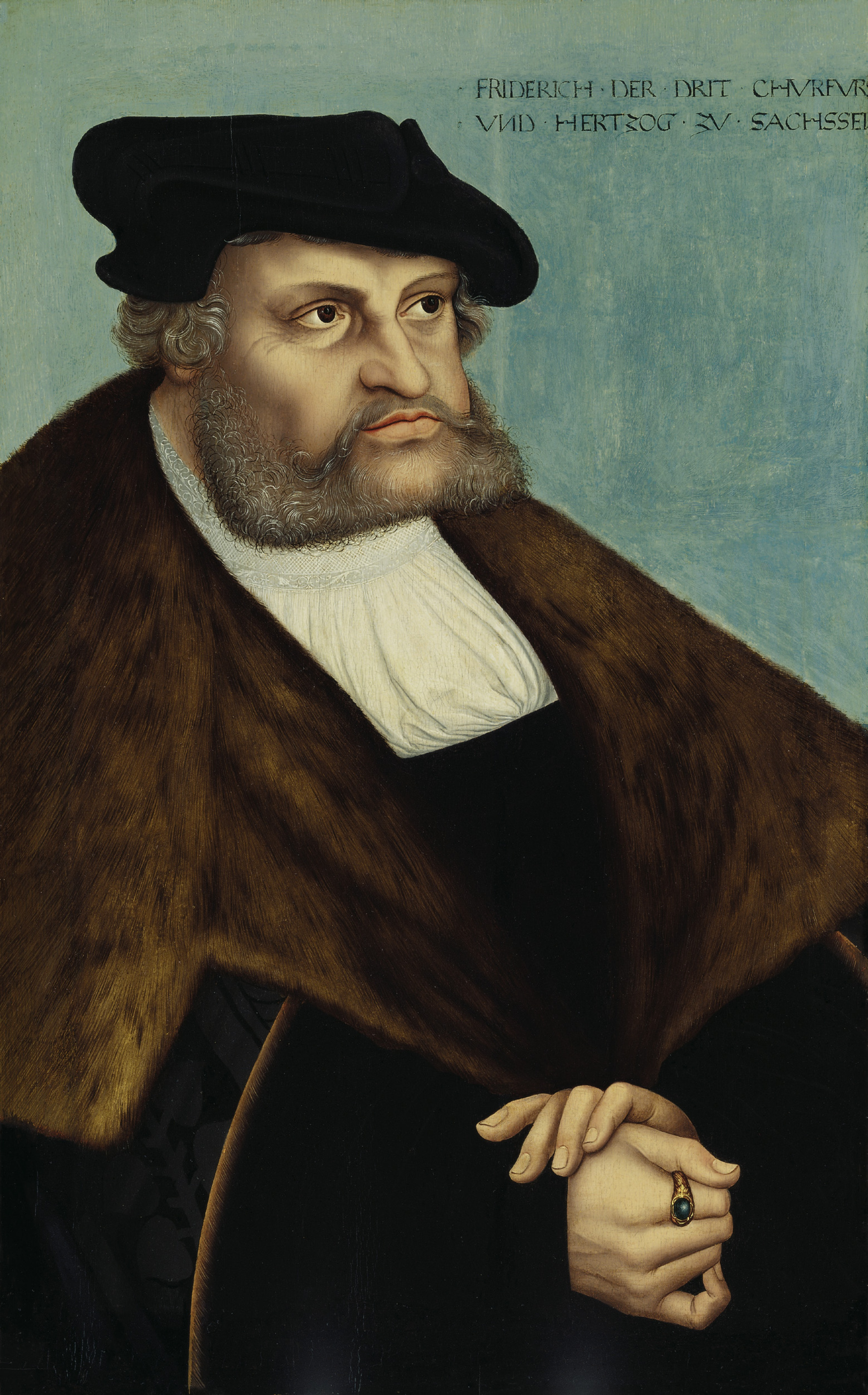
- Portrait by Lucas Cranach the Elder

Elector of Saxony
- Reign: 26 August 1486 – 5 May 1525
- Predecessor: Ernest
- Successor: John
- Born: 17 January 1463; Torgau, Electorate of Saxony, Holy Roman Empire
- Died: 5 May 1525 (aged 62); Castle Lochau near Annaburg, Electorate of Saxony, Holy Roman Empire
- Burial: Schlosskirche, Wittenberg
- House: Wettin (Ernestine line)
- Father: Ernest, Elector of Saxony
- Mother: Elisabeth of Bavaria
- Religion: Roman Catholic (1463–1525); Unclear (1525)
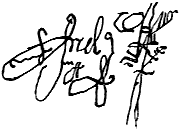
- Signature

Frederick III (17 January 1463 – 5 May 1525), also known as Frederick the Wise (German: Friedrich der Weise), was Prince-elector of Saxony from 1486 to 1525, who is mostly remembered for the protection given to his subject Martin Luther, the seminal figure of the Protestant Reformation. He was the son of Ernest, Elector of Saxony, and Elisabeth, daughter of Albert III, Duke of Bavaria.

He was one of the most powerful early defenders of Martin Luther, as the elector successfully protected him from the Holy Roman Emperor, the Pope and others. He was ostensibly led, not by religious conviction about the possible truth of Luther's propositions, but rather by personal belief in a fair trial for any of his subjects (a privilege guaranteed by the imperial statutory law) and the rule of law.

The prince-elector is considered to have remained a Roman Catholic all his life, yet gradually inclining toward doctrines of the Reformation and supposedly converting on his deathbed.

== Biography ==
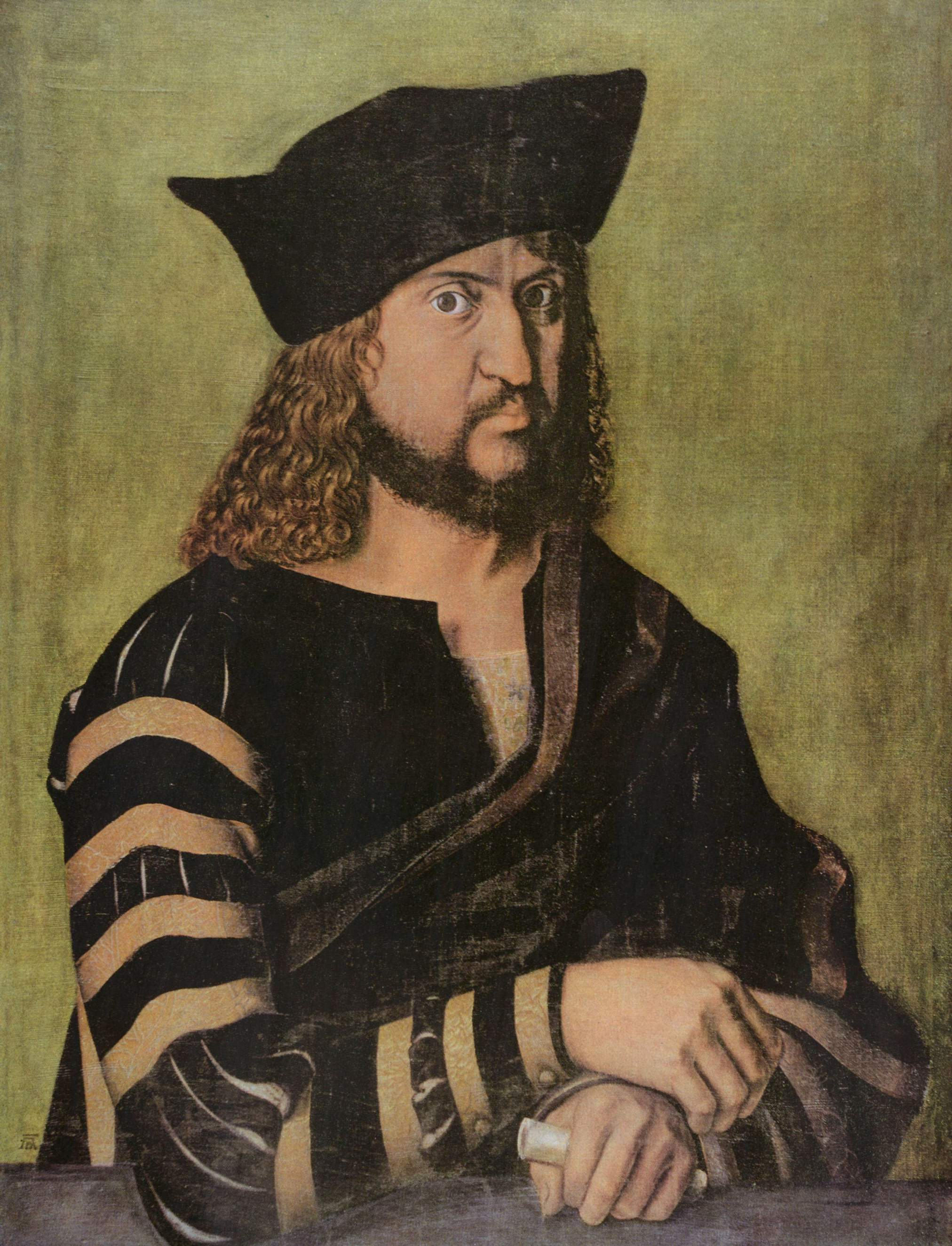
Portrait of Frederick III of Saxony at his thirties, made by Albrecht Dürer in 1496.

His court painter from 1504 on was the Renaissance master Lucas Cranach the Elder (1472–1553).

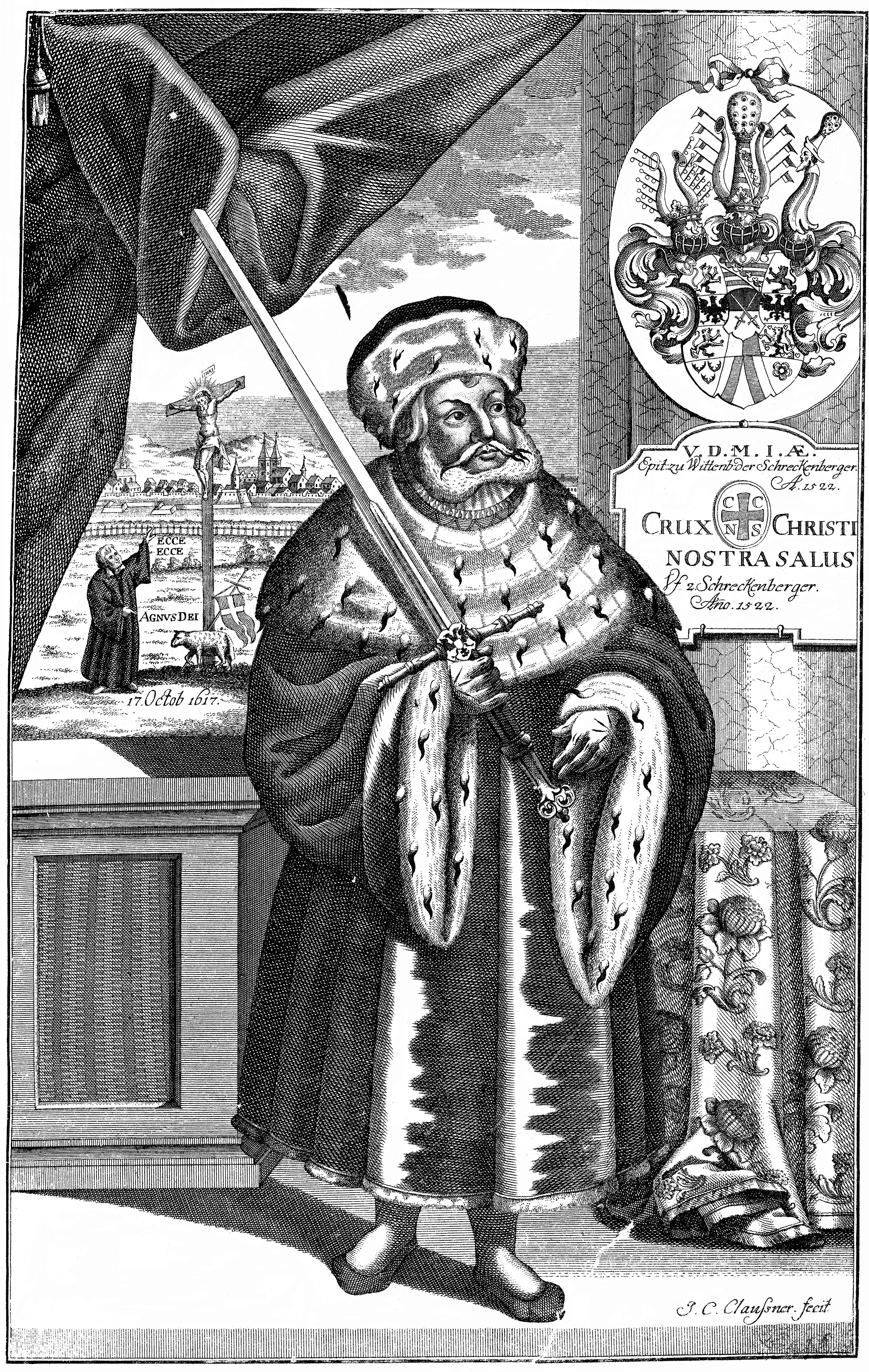
Portrait of Frederick III of Saxony (17th century)

Born in Torgau, he succeeded his father as elector in 1486; in 1502, he founded the University of Wittenberg with his childhood friend Johann von Staupitz, where theologians Martin Luther and Philip Melanchthon would teach a while later.

Frederick was among the German princes who pressed the need of reform upon Maximilian I, Holy Roman Emperor, and in 1500, he became president of the newly formed council of regency (Reichsregiment).

Frederick was Pope Leo X's candidate for Holy Roman Emperor at the 1519 imperial election; thus the Pope had awarded him the Golden Rose of virtue on 3 September 1518 in an effort to persuade him to accept the throne. However, Frederick helped secure the election of Charles V by agreeing to support Charles and to convince his fellow electors to do the same if Charles repaid an outstanding debt to the Saxons dating back to 1497.

Frederick collected many relics in his Castle Church; his inventory of 1518 listed 17,443 items, including a thumb from St. Anne, a twig from Moses' burning bush, hay of the holy manger, and milk from the Virgin Mary. Money was paid in order to venerate these relics and thus escape years in purgatory, according to the current belief in indulgence at that context. Thus, according to some calculations, a diligent and pious person who rendered appropriate devotion to each of these relics at that time would be able to merit 1,902,202 years worth of penance (an earthly equivalent of time otherwise spent in purgatory, removed by indulgences). Two years later, the collection exceeded 19,000 pieces.

== The elector's dream ==
A manuscript from 1591 purports to record a dream of Frederick on about October 30, 1517 which foreshadowed Luther and the work of the Reformation. It was later widely circulated, e.g. by Adventist prophet Ellen White, as a prophetic sign of divine support for Luther and the Reformation, and to explain why Frederick III, a Catholic, protected Luther.

== Protection of Martin Luther ==
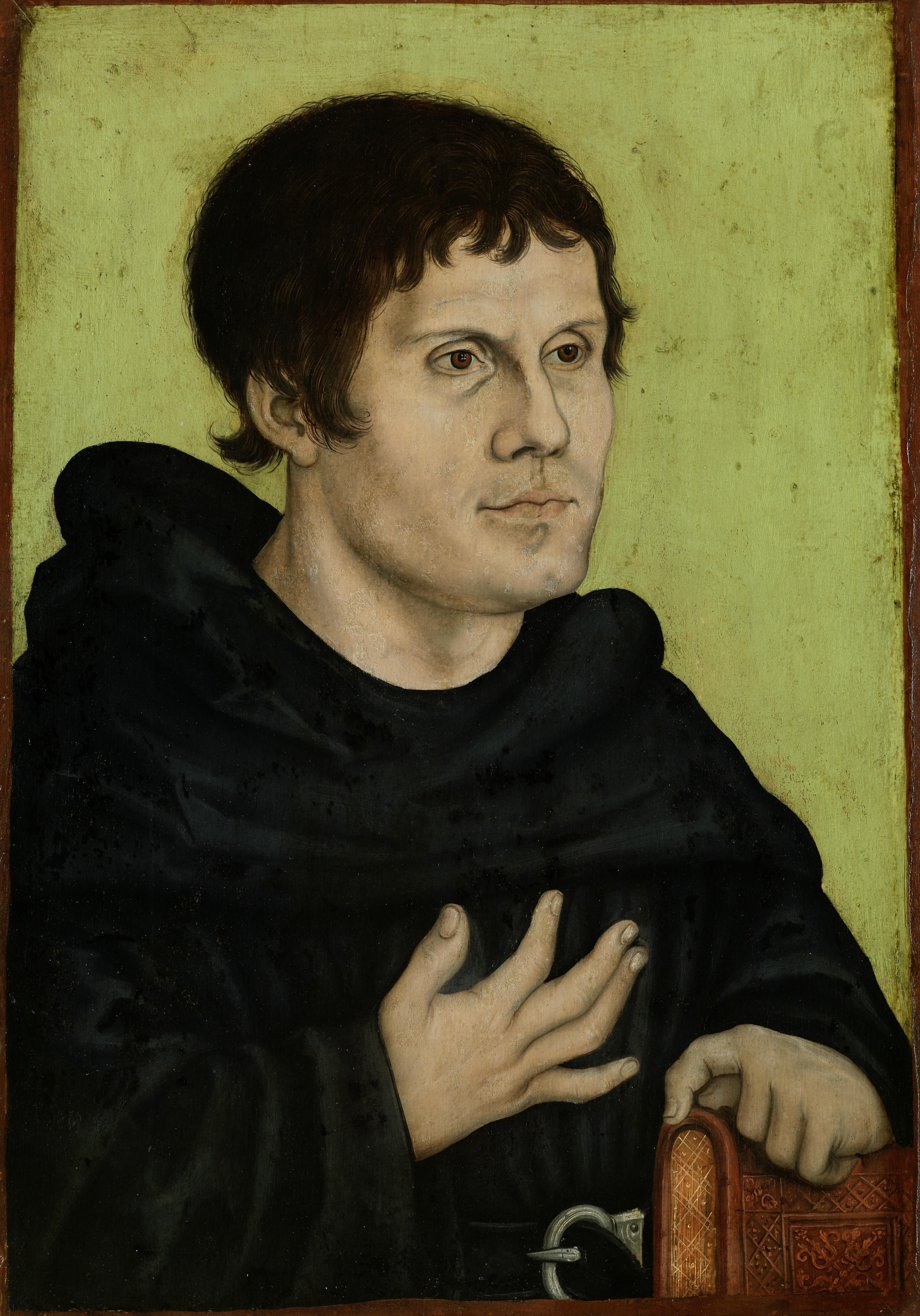
A posthumous portrait of Luther as an Augustinian friar

Martin Luther, an Augustinian friar whose spiritual director was Johann von Staupitz, was ordained to the priesthood in 1507, and on the following year, in 1508, he began teaching theology at the University of Wittenberg, which was located in the Electorate of Saxony, i.e., inside the territory ruled by Prince-elector Frederick III. Therefore, Luther was a subject of the elector, by living at his domains.

Luther received two bachelor's degrees, one in biblical studies on 9 March 1508, and another in the Sentences by Peter Lombard in 1509. On 19 October 1512, he was awarded his Doctor of Theology. On 21 October 1512, Luther was received into the senate of the theological faculty of the University of Wittenberg, succeeding von Staupitz as chair of theology. He spent the rest of his career in this position at the University of Wittenberg. In 1515, he was made provincial vicar of Saxony and Thuringia, which required him to visit and oversee eleven monasteries in his province.

From 1510 to 1520, Luther lectured on the Psalms, and on the books of Hebrews, Romans, and Galatians. As he studied these portions of the Bible, he came to view the use of terms such as penance and righteousness by the Catholic Church in new ways. He became convinced that the church was corrupt in its ways and had lost sight of what he saw as several of the central truths of Christianity. The most important for Luther was the doctrine of justification—God's act of declaring a sinner righteous—by faith alone through God's grace. He began to teach that salvation or redemption is a gift of God's grace, attainable only through faith in Jesus as the Messiah. "This one and firm rock, which we call the doctrine of justification", he writes, "is the chief article of the whole Christian doctrine, which comprehends the understanding of all godliness."

After a while, Luther came to reject several teachings and practices of the Roman Catholic Church; in particular, he disputed the view on indulgences. Luther attempted to resolve these differences amicably, first proposing an academic discussion of its practice and efficacy.

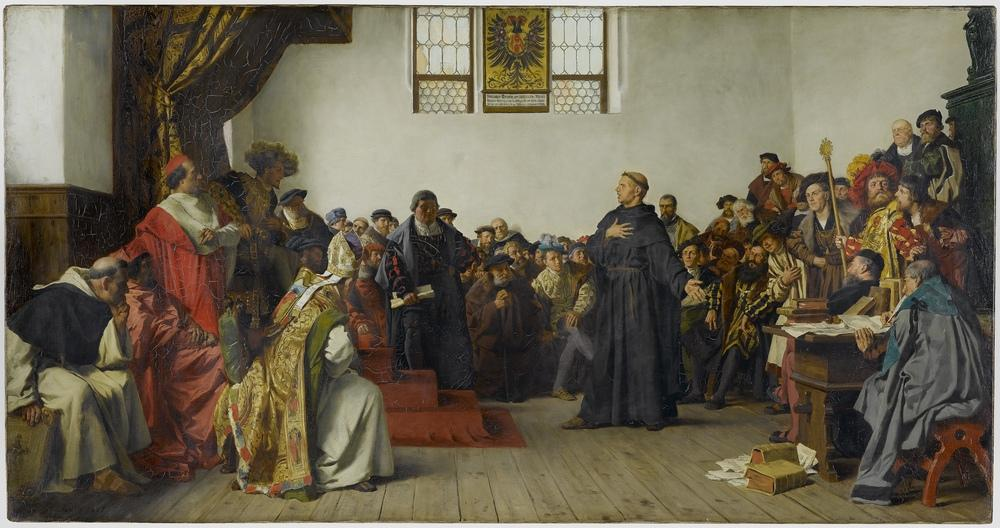
Luther Before the Diet of Worms, where Frederick III attempted in vain to create for Luther the chance of a fair trial and the possible support of other German nobles. Painting by Anton von Werner, 1877.

In 1516, Johann Tetzel, a Dominican friar, was sent to Germany by the Roman Catholic Church to sell indulgences to raise money in order to rebuild St. Peter's Basilica in Rome.

Then, on 31 October 1517, Luther wrote to his bishop, Albrecht von Brandenburg, protesting against the sale of indulgences. He enclosed in his letter a copy of his "Disputation on the Power and Efficacy of Indulgences", (Note: Latin: "Disputatio pro declaratione virtutis indulgentiarum" – The first printings of the Theses use an incipit rather than a title which summarizes the content. Luther usually called them "meine Propositiones" (my propositions).) which came to be known as the Ninety-five Theses.

In 1520, Pope Leo X demanded that Luther renounce all of his writings, and when Luther refused to do so, excommunicated him in January 1521.

Then, to give him the right to a fair trial, Elector Frederick ensured that Martin Luther would be heard before the Diet of Worms in 1521; after Holy Roman Emperor Charles V condemned Luther as an outlaw at the Diet, the elector also secured an exemption from the Edict of Worms for Saxony.

The Elector then protected Luther from the Pope's enforcement of the edict by faking a highway attack on Luther's way back to Wittenberg, abducting and then hiding him for several years at Wartburg Castle after the Diet of Worms.

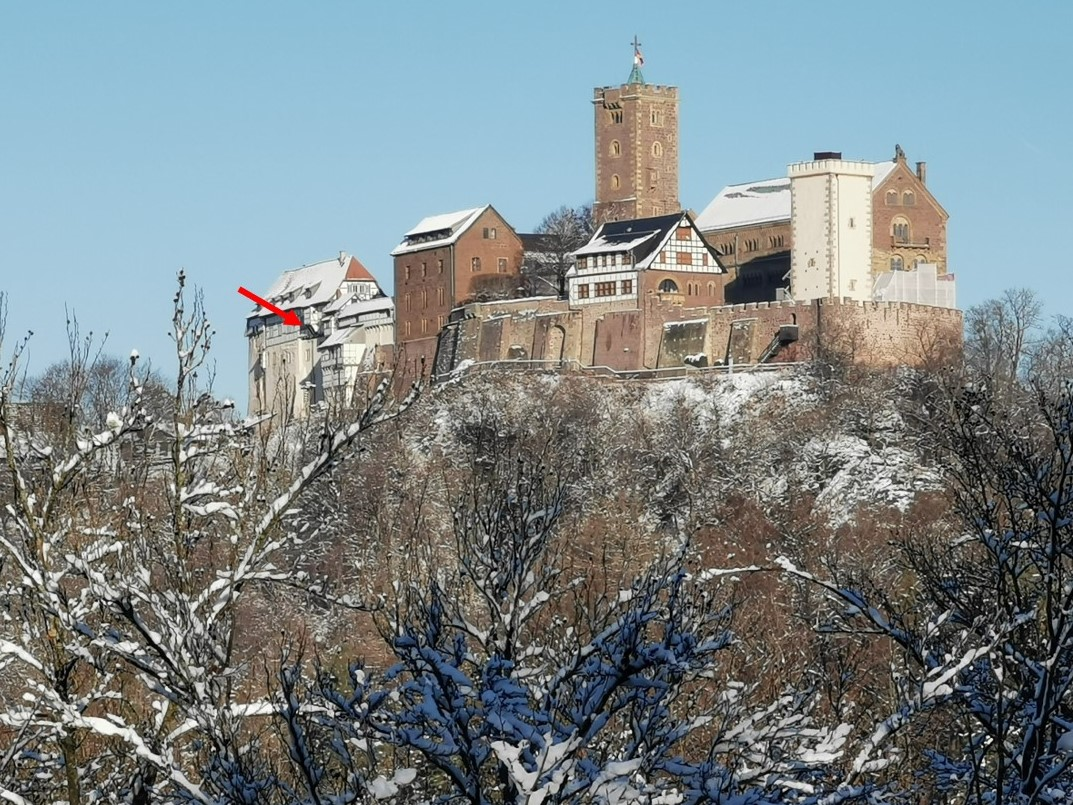
Wartburg Castle, where Frederick III ordered Martin Luther to be taken and hidden for his own protection after the Diet of Worms, and where the reformer wrote several of his works.

Luther's disappearance during his return to Wittenberg was planned by Frederick III, who had him intercepted on his way home in the forest near Wittenberg by masked horsemen impersonating highway robbers. They escorted Luther to the security of the Wartburg Castle at Eisenach, where he remained disguised as "Junker Jörg".

Frederick protected Luther to safeguard the reputation of Saxony's University and to protect Saxony from external interference; since Saxony was a electorate for the imperial throne, neither the Popes nor the Habsburg emperors were willing to affect the imperial election by pursuing the matter against Frederick.

During his stay at Wartburg, which he referred to as "my Patmos", Luther translated the New Testament from Greek into German and poured out doctrinal and polemical writings.

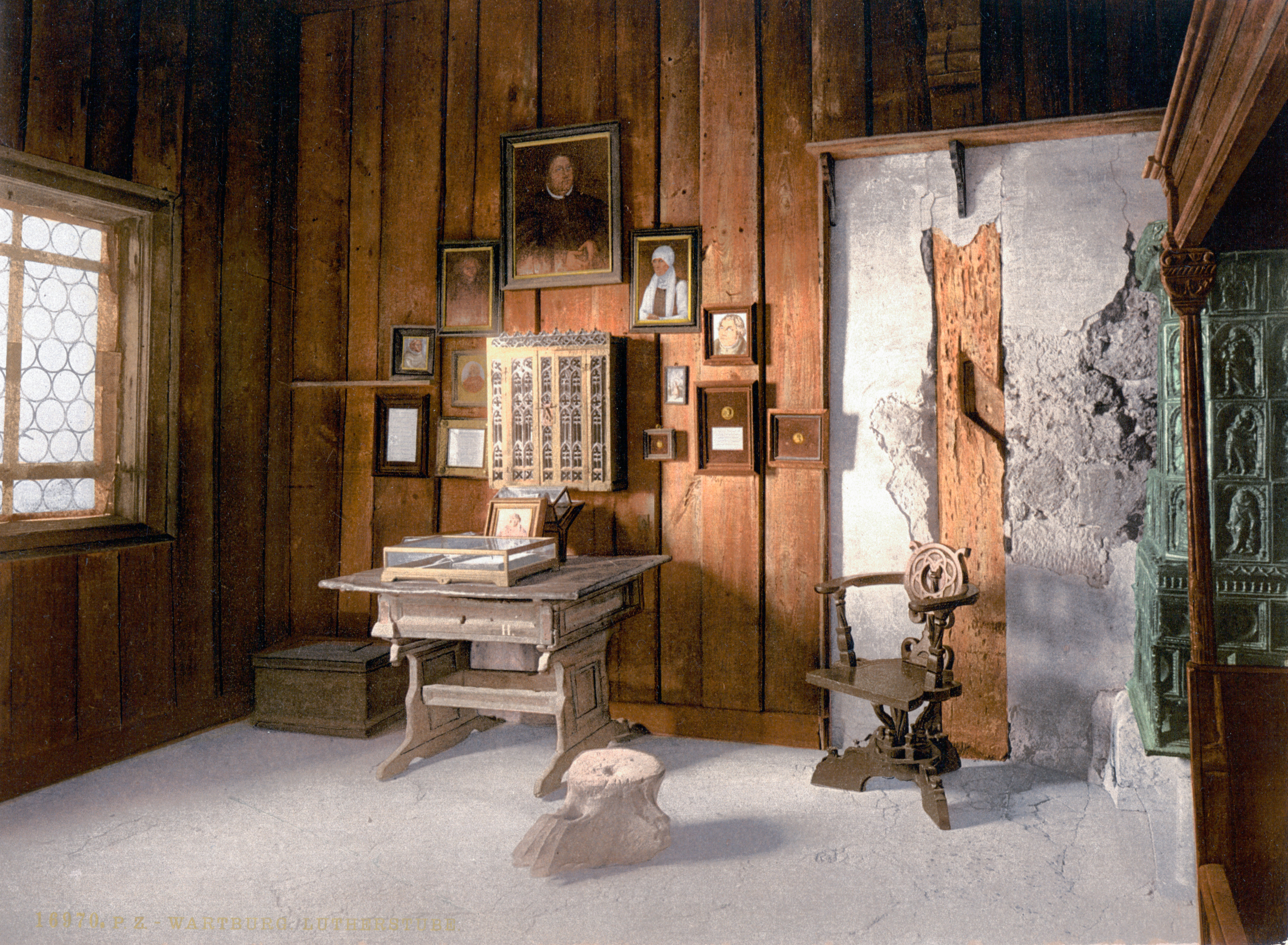
The Wartburg room where Luther translated the New Testament into German; an original first edition is kept in the case on the desk.

In the summer of 1521, Luther widened his target from individual pieties like indulgences and pilgrimages to doctrines at the heart of Church practice.

In On the Abrogation of the Private Mass, he condemned as idolatry the idea that the mass is a sacrifice, asserting instead that it is a gift, to be received with thanksgiving by the whole congregation. His essay On Confession, Whether the Pope has the Power to Require It rejected compulsory confession and encouraged private confession and absolution, since "every Christian is a confessor." In November, Luther wrote The Judgement of Martin Luther on Monastic Vows. He assured monks and nuns that they could break their vows without sin, because vows were an illegitimate and vain attempt to win salvation.

== Last years and Wittenberg happenings ==
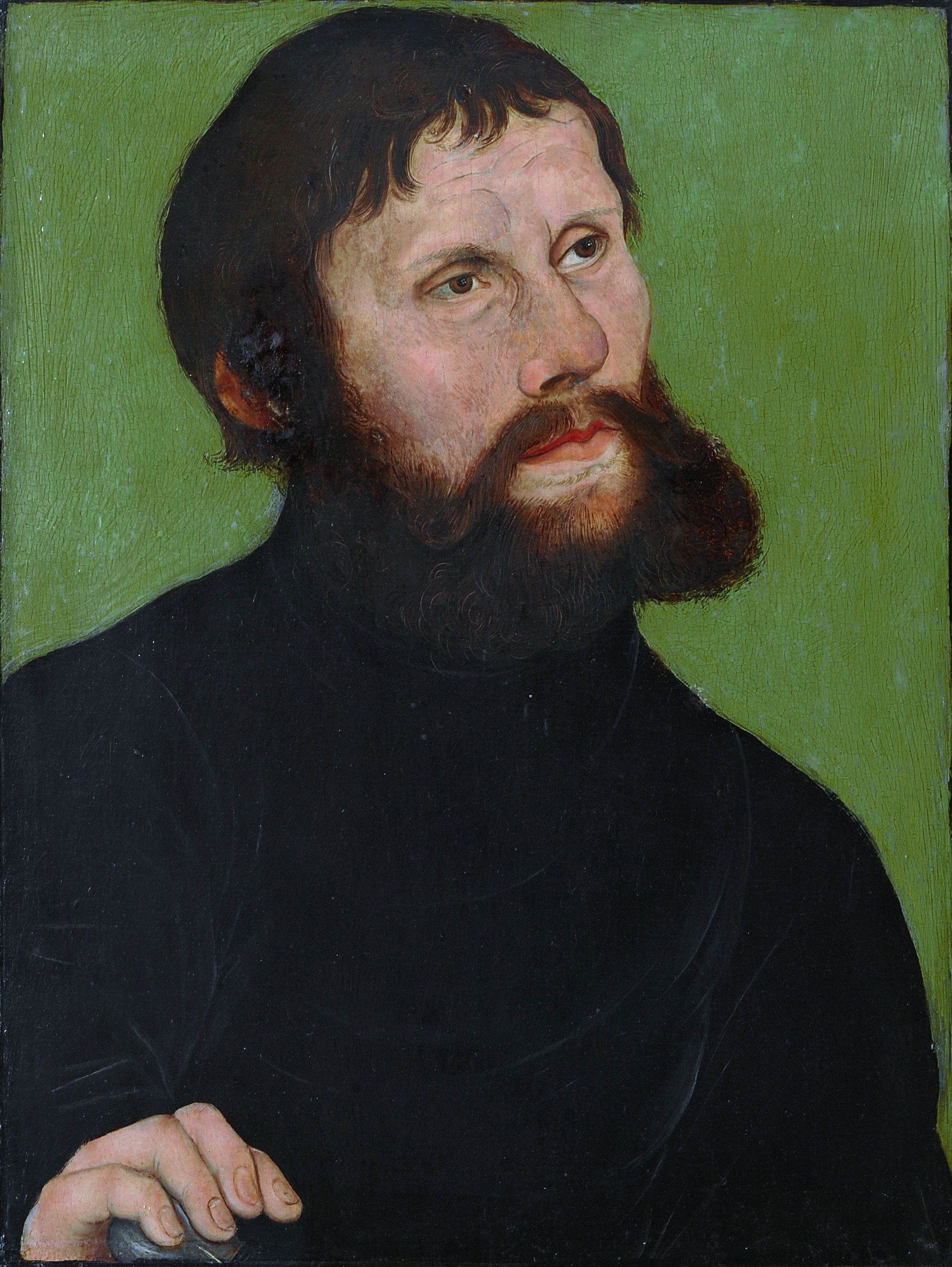
Luther disguised as "Junker Jörg" at Wartburg Castle in 1521

Despite actively protecting Luther from the hostile menaces against him, the elector had little personal contact with the reformer himself, but Frederick's treasurer Degenhart Pfaffinger spoke on his behalf to Luther, as Pfaffinger had supported the elector since their pilgrimage to the Holy Land together.

The pronouncements by Luther from Wartburg Castle were made the context of rapid developments at Wittenberg, of which he was kept fully informed while residing at the fortress. Andreas Karlstadt, supported by the ex-Augustinian Gabriel Zwilling, embarked on a radical programme of reform there in June 1521, exceeding anything envisaged by Luther. The reforms provoked disturbances, including a revolt by the Augustinian friars against their prior, the smashing of statues and images in churches, and denunciations of the magistracy.

After secretly visiting Wittenberg in early December 1521, Luther wrote A Sincere Admonition by Martin Luther to All Christians to Guard Against Insurrection and Rebellion.

Wittenberg became even more volatile after Christmas when a band of visionary zealots, the so-called Zwickau prophets, arrived, preaching revolutionary doctrines such as the absolute equality of man, adult baptism, and Christ's imminent return. When the town council asked Luther to return, he decided it was his duty to act.

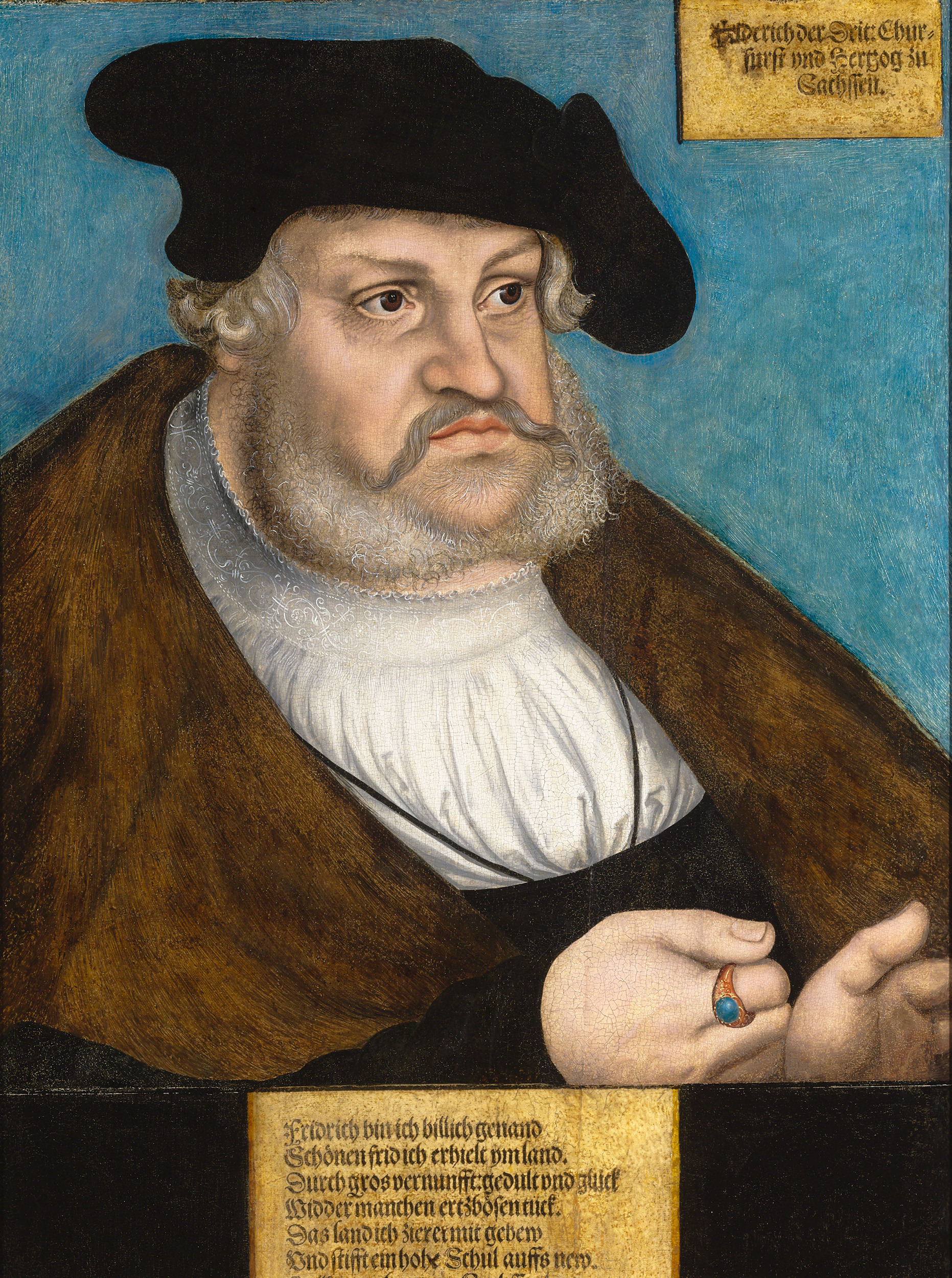
Posthumous portrait of Frederick the Wise by Lucas Cranach the Elder, c. 1530–1535

Luther secretly returned to Wittenberg on 6 March 1522. He wrote to the elector: "During my absence, Satan has entered my sheepfold, and committed ravages which I cannot repair by writing, but only by my personal presence and living word." For eight days in Lent, beginning on Invocavit Sunday, 9 March, Luther preached eight sermons, which became known as the "Invocavit Sermons". In these sermons, he hammered home the primacy of core Christian values such as love, patience, charity, and freedom, and reminded the citizens to trust God's word rather than violence to bring about necessary change.

The effect of Luther's intervention was immediate at the city. After the sixth sermon, the Wittenberg jurist Jerome Schurf wrote to the elector: "Oh, what joy has Dr. Martin's return spread among us! His words, through divine mercy, are bringing back every day misguided people into the way of the truth."

Illustration of the tomb of Frederick the Wise, sculpted by Peter Vischer the Younger (1486–1517)

Luther next set about reversing or modifying the new church practices. By working alongside the authorities to restore public order, he signaled his reinvention as a conservative force within the Reformation.

Despite his victory in Wittenberg, after banishing the Zwickau prophets, Luther would still have to fight elsewhere against both the established Catholic Church and also the radical reformers who threatened the new order by fomenting social unrest and violence.

== Personal faith and issue of conversion ==
Frederick III was a lifelong Roman Catholic, but he might have converted to Lutheranism on his deathbed in 1525 depending on how his receiving of a Protestant communion is viewed.

The elector leaned heavily towards Lutheranism throughout his later years, guaranteeing safety for his subject and Protestant reformer Martin Luther, so that he would not receive the same fate as of Jan Huss and other pre-reformers, after he was tried for heresy and excommunicated by the Pope.

== Contribution to development of classical art of riding ==
Frederick the Wise was one of the first German prince-electors to import horses based on the Median Nisaean breed to Germany, referring to them as “Turks.” They were bred at his stud farms in Bleesern and Torgau, making Bleesern the oldest surviving tame stud farm in Central Europe.

Frederick maintained contact with the House of Gonzaga, who bred similar horses in Mantua (the building is now known as the Palazzo Té). These horses laid the foundation for the development of equestrian art in Germany, which replaced the knightly style of riding with a stiff leg (known as à la brida or Ghisa).

Equestrian art flourished after Bleesern came under the control of the Albertine line and with the arrival of the Neapolitan riding master Carlo Theti in Dresden, during the reigns of Augustus of Saxony and Christian I.

== Death and succession ==
Silver Saxony coin of Frederick III, known as a Groschen, minted ca. 1507–25. Both the obverse and the reverse bear a version of the Saxony Electorate's coat of arms.

Frederick died unmarried in 1525, aged 62 years old, at Lochau, a hunting castle near Annaburg (30 km southeast of Wittenberg), and was buried in the Castle Church at Wittenberg, with a grave tomb sculpted by Peter Vischer the Younger.

As he was unmarried and had no offspring, he was succeeded as prince-elector of Saxony by his brother John the Steadfast, as former duke and heir presumptive of his older brother. John had been Lutheran even before succeeding Frederick as elector, and continued with his policies of supporting the Reformation, having made the Lutheran church the official state church in Saxony in 1527.

== Ancestry ==
Ancestors of Frederick III of Saxony

8. Frederick I, Elector of Saxony
4. Frederick II, Elector of Saxony
9. Catherine of Brunswick
2. Ernest, Elector of Saxony
10. Ernest, Duke of Austria
5. Margaret of Austria
11. Cymburgis of Masovia
1. Frederick III, Elector of Saxony
12. Ernest, Duke of Bavaria
6. Albert III, Duke of Bavaria
13. Elisabetta Visconti
3. Elisabeth of Bavaria
14. Eric I, Duke of Brunswick-Grubenhagen
7. Anna of Brunswick-Grubenhagen-Einbeck
15. Elisabeth of Brunswick-Göttingen

== See also ==
- Portrait of Frederick III of Saxony
- Luther (2003 film)

== Sources ==
- Cummings, Brian (2002). The Literary Culture of the Reformation: Grammar and Grace. Oxford: Oxford University Press. doi:10.1093/acprof:oso/9780198187356.001.0001. ISBN 978-0-19-818735-6 – via Oxford Scholarship Online.

Frederick III of Saxony House of Wettin Born: 16 January 1463 Died: 5 May 1525
Regnal titles
Preceded by Ernest	Elector of Saxony; 1486–1525	Succeeded by John the Constant
