= Reformation =

16th-century movement in Western Christianity

The Reformation, also known as the Protestant Reformation or the European Reformation, was a major theological movement in Western Christianity in 16th-century Europe that posed a religious and political challenge to the papacy and the authority of the Catholic Church hierarchy. Towards the end of the Renaissance, the Reformation marked the beginning of Protestantism. It is considered one of the events that signified the end of the Middle Ages and the beginning of the early modern period in Europe.

The Reformation is usually dated from Martin Luther's publication of the Ninety-five Theses in 1517, which gave birth to Lutheranism. Prior to Martin Luther and other Protestant Reformers, there were earlier reform movements within Western Christianity. The end of the Reformation era is disputed among modern scholars.

In general, the Reformers argued that justification was based on faith in Jesus Christ alone and not both faith and arising charitable acts, as in the Catholic view. In the Lutheran, Anglican and Reformed view, good works were seen as fruits of living faith and part of the process of sanctification which was distinct from justification. Protestantism also introduced new ecclesiology. The general points of theological agreement by the different Protestant groups have been more recently summarized as the three solae, though various Protestant denominations disagree on doctrines such as the nature of the real presence of Christ in the Eucharist, with Lutherans accepting a corporeal presence and the Reformed accepting a spiritual presence.

The spread of Gutenberg's printing press provided the means for the rapid dissemination of religious materials in the local vernacular. The initial movement in Saxony, Germany, diversified, and nearby other reformers such as the Swiss Huldrych Zwingli and the French John Calvin developed the Continental Reformed tradition. Within a Reformed framework, Thomas Cranmer and John Knox led the Reformation in England and the Reformation in Scotland, respectively, giving rise to Anglicanism and Presbyterianism. The period also saw the rise of non-Catholic denominations with quite different theologies and politics to the Magisterial Reformers (Lutherans, Reformed, and Anglicans): so-called Radical Reformers such as the various Anabaptists, who sought to return to the practices of early Christianity. The Counter-Reformation comprised the Catholic response to the Reformation, with the Council of Trent clarifying ambiguous or disputed Catholic positions and abuses that had been subject to critique by reformers. The consequent European wars of religion saw the deaths of between seven and seventeen million people.

== Terminology ==
In the 16th-century context, the term mainly covers four major movements: Lutheranism, Calvinism, the Radical Reformation, and the Catholic Reformation or Counter-Reformation. Since the late 20th century, historians often use the plural of the term to emphasize that the Reformation was not a uniform and coherent historical phenomenon but the result of parallel movements.

Anglican theologian Alister McGrath explains the term "Reformation" as "an interpretative category—a way of mapping out a slice of history in which certain ideas, attitudes, and values were developed, explored, and applied". Historian John Bossy criticized the term Reformation for "wrongly implying that bad religion was giving way to good," but also because it has "little application to actual social behaviour and little or no sensitivity to thought, feeling or culture." A French scholar has noted "no Reformation term is indisputable" and that "Reformation studies has revealed that 'Protestants' and 'Catholics' were not as homogenous as once thought."

Specific terminology includes:

- "Protestant Reformation" excludes the Renaissance and early modern Catholic reform movements.
- "Magisterial Reformation" has a narrower sense, as it refers only to mainstream Protestantism, primarily Lutheranism, Anglicanism and Calvinism, contrasting it with more radical ideas such as the Anabaptists'.
- "Catholic Reformation" is distinguished by the historian Massimo Firpo from Counter-Reformation. In his view, Catholic Reformation was "centered on the care of souls ..., episcopal residence, the renewal of the clergy, together with the charitable and educational roles of the new religious orders", whereas Counter-Reformation was "founded upon the defence of orthodoxy, the repression of dissent, the reassertion of ecclesiastical authority".
- Some historians have also suggested a persisting "Erasmian Reformation." (Note: Historian Hendrik Enno van Gelder suggested that the Reformations of Luther and Calvin were minor affairs compared to the Reformation of Erasmus and the humanists, "which propelled Christianity further than (the others) could do, away from medieval Catholicism and towards the modern world." Historians Edward Gibbon and Hugh Trevor-Roper also wrote of a "third church".)

Several aspects of the Reformation, such as changes in the arts, music, rituals, and communities are frequently presented in specialised studies.

The historian Peter Marshall emphasizes that the "call for 'reform' within Christianity is about as old as the religion itself, and in every age there have been urgent attempts to bring it about". Charlemagne employed a "rhetoric of reform". (Note: "This 'rhetoric of reform' crops up in a variety of sources all of which originated in the royal court of Charlemagne and his successors. Subsequently, words such as corrigere, emendare, renovare, reformare and their synonyms, readily became the instruments for achieving unity, and unity gave the Christian empire of Charlemagne pax, caritas and concordia.") Medieval examples include the Cluniac Reform in the 10th–11th centuries, and the 11th-century Gregorian Reform, both striving against lay influence over church affairs. When demanding a church reform, medieval authors mainly adopted a conservative and utopian approach, expressing their admiration for a previous "golden age" or "apostolic age" when the Church had allegedly been perfect and free of abuses.

When considered as a historical time period, both the starting and ending date of the Reformation have always been debated. The most commonly used starting date is 31 October 1517—the day when the German theologian Martin Luther (d. 1546) allegedly nailed up a copy of his disputation paper on indulgences and papal power known as the Ninety-five Theses to the door of the castle church in Wittenberg in Electoral Saxony. (Note: As Wittenberg academics regularly published their disputation papers by posting it to the door of the castle church, the story is quite probable even if it was first mentioned years after the events.) Calvinist historians often propose that the Reformation started when the Swiss priest Huldrych Zwingli (d. 1531) first preached against abuses in the Church in 1516. The end date of the Reformation is even more disputed: considered as political/martial strife, 25 September 1555 (when the Peace of Augsburg was accepted), 23 May 1618 and 24 October 1648 (when the Thirty Years' War began and ended, respectively) are the most commonly mentioned terminuses. The Reformation has always been presented as one of the most crucial episodes of the early modern period, or even regarded as the event separating the modern era from the Middle Ages.

The term Protestant, though initially purely political in nature, later acquired a broader sense, referring to a member of any Western church that subscribed to the main Reformation (or anti-Catholic) principles. Six princes of the Holy Roman Empire and rulers of fourteen Imperial Free Cities, who issued a protest (or dissent) against the edict of the Diet of Speyer (1529), were the first individuals to be called Protestants. The edict reversed concessions made to the Lutherans with the approval of Holy Roman Emperor Charles V three years earlier.

== Background ==
=== Calamities ===
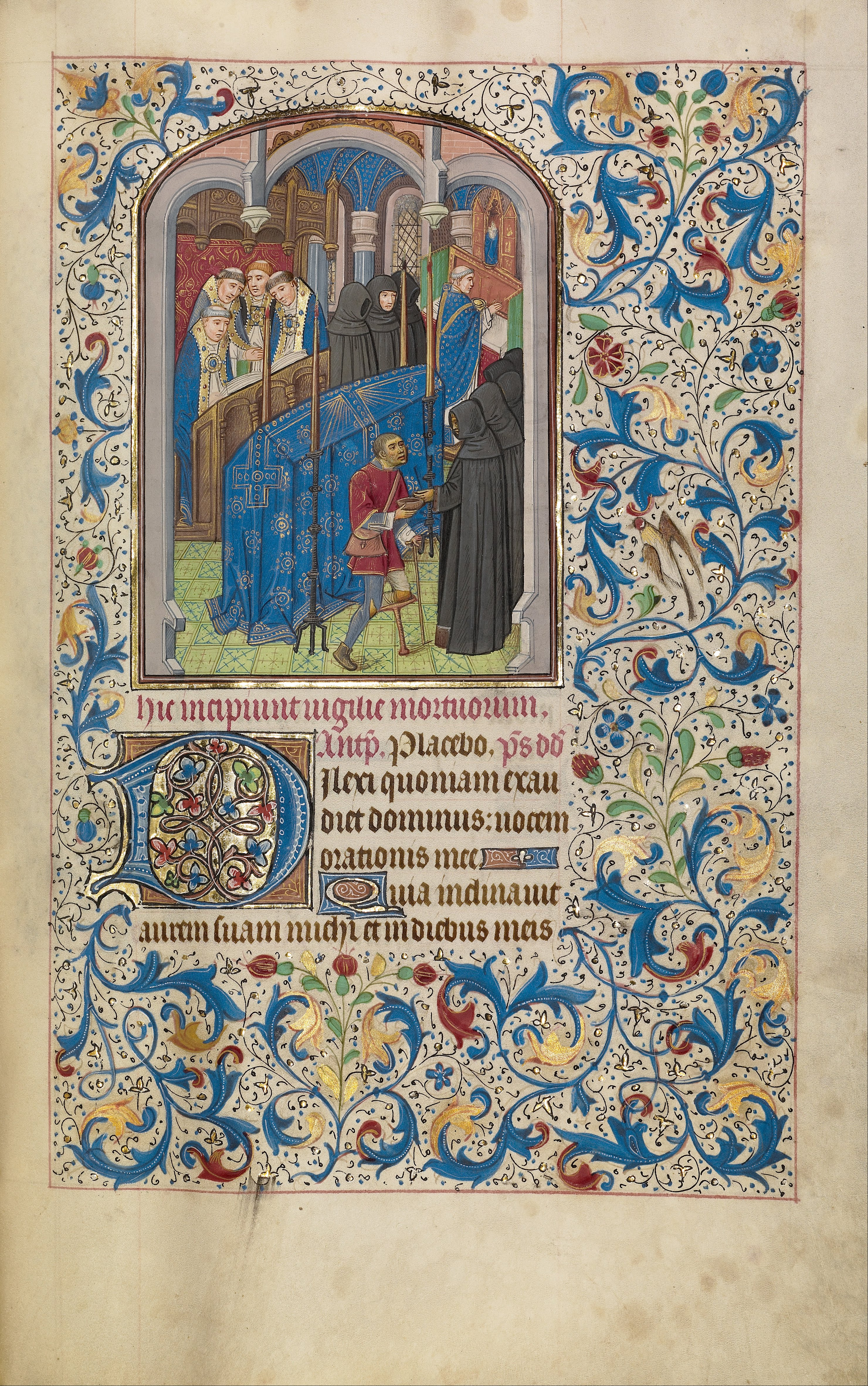
Funeral Mass with priest, choristers, bearers or mourners, and a beggar receiving alms (c. 1460–1480)

Europe experienced a period of dreadful calamities from the early 14th century. These culminated in a devastating pandemic known as the Black Death, which killed about one-third of Europe's population. Around 1500, the population of Europe was about 60–85 million people—no more than 75 percent of the mid-14th-century demographic maximum. Due to a shortage of workforce, the landlords began to restrict the rights of their tenants which led to rural revolts that often ended with a compromise.

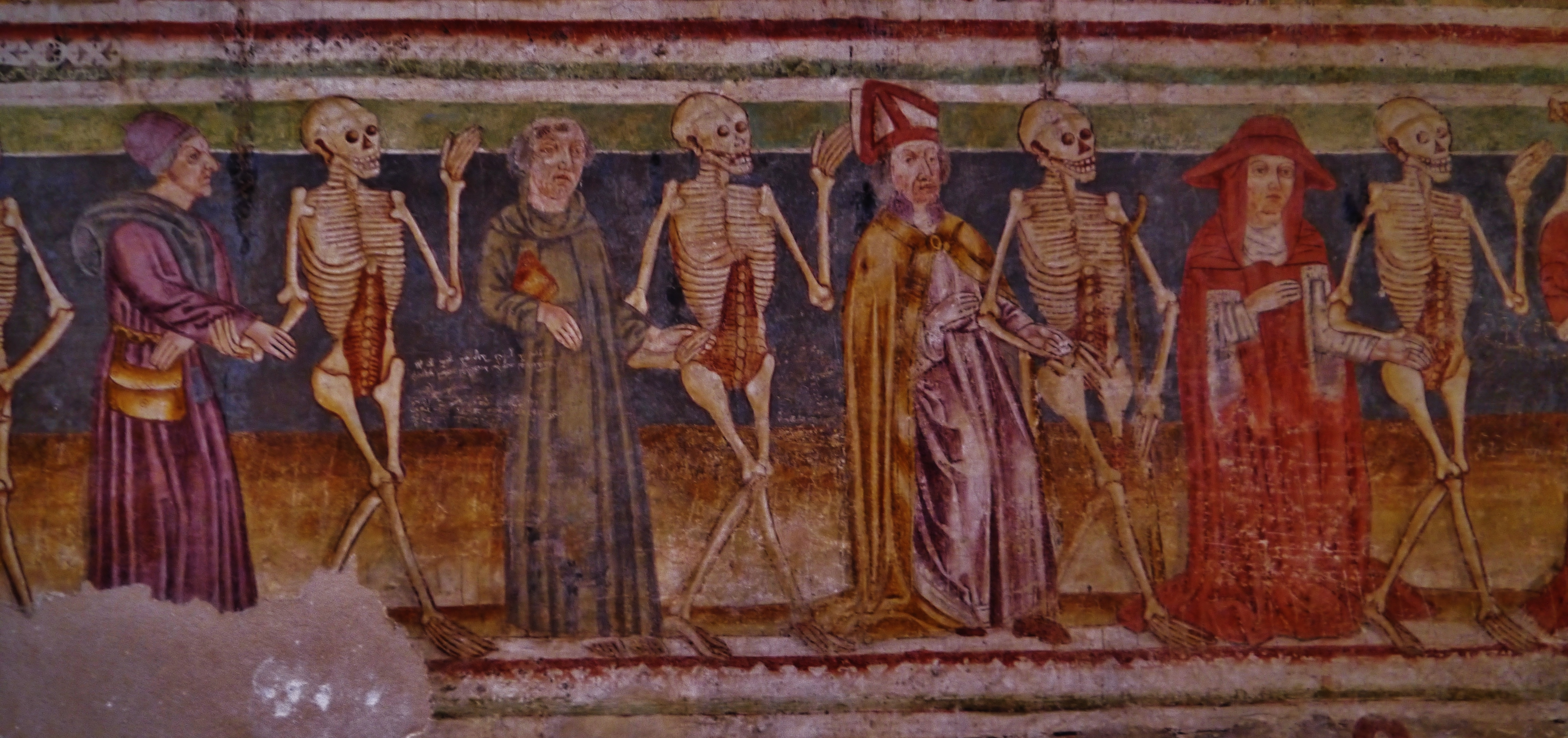
Detail of the danse macabre (1490) by John of Kastav in the Holy Trinity Church, Hrastovlje, Slovenia

The constant fear of unexpected death was mirrored by popular artistic motifs, such as the allegory of danse macabre ('dance of death'). The fear also contributed to the growing popularity of Masses for the dead. Already detectable among early Christians, these ceremonies indicated a widespread belief in purgatory—a transitory state for souls that needed purification before entering heaven. Fear of malevolent magical practice was also growing, and witch hunts intensified.

At the end of the 15th century, the sexually transmitted infection known as syphilis spread throughout Europe for the first time. Syphilis destroyed its victims' looks with ulcers and scabs before killing them. Along with the French invasion of Italy, syphilis contributed to the success of the charismatic preacher Girolamo Savonarola (d. 1498) who called for a moral renewal in Florence. He was arrested and executed for heresy, but his meditations remained a popular reading.

=== Late Medieval Christianity ===
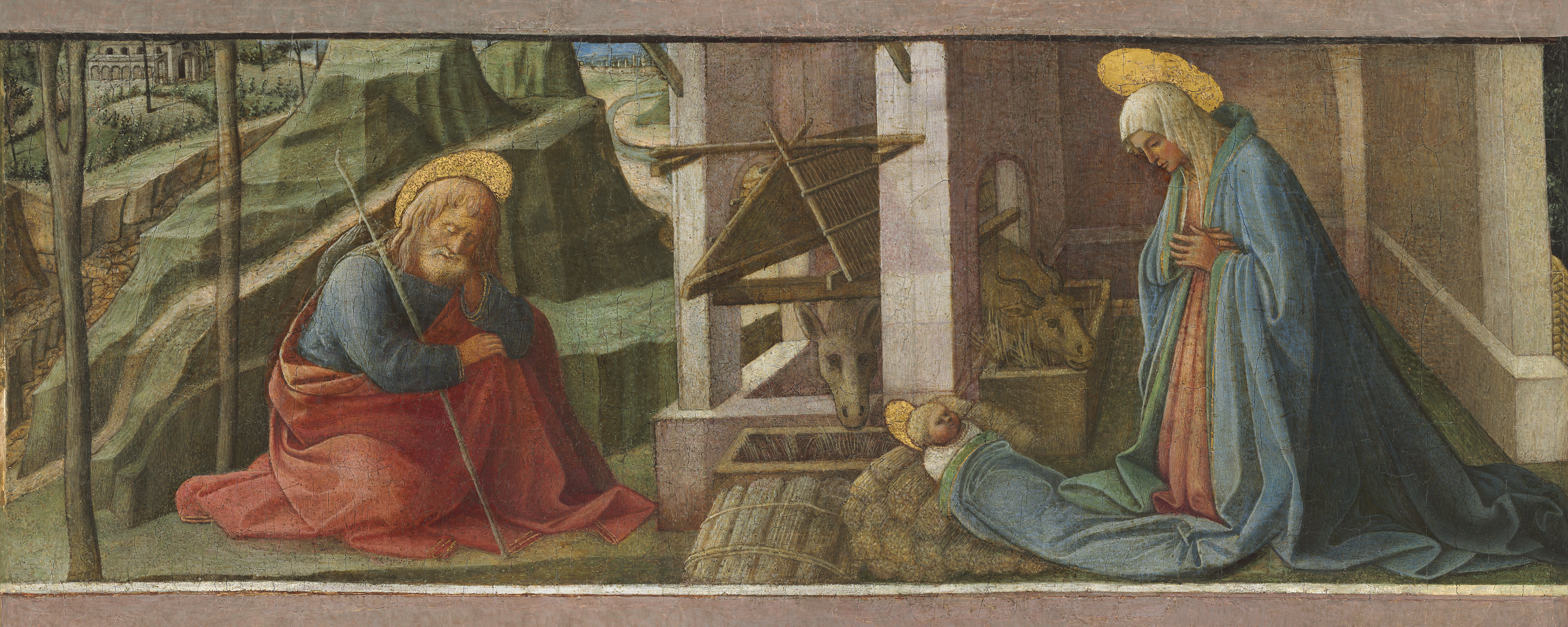
The Nativity (1445) by Filippo Lippi. When painting Nativity scenes, Renaissance artists mainly portrayed maternal love instead of depicting an abstract interpretation of the Incarnation as Romanesque and Gothic artists had done.

==== Lay community ====
Historian John Bossy (as summarized by Eamon Duffy) emphasized that "medieval Christianity had been fundamentally concerned with the creation and maintenance of peace in a violent world. 'Christianity' in medieval Europe denoted neither an ideology nor an institution, but a community of believers whose religious ideal—constantly aspired to if seldom attained—was peace and mutual love." (Note: Bossy's economic argument was that feudalism was largely a zero-sum economy where the advantage of one people or class could only be obtained by disadvantaging some other people or class, frequently using or resulting in violence, in contrast to later mercantile and capitalist economies.)

The Catholic Church taught that entry into heaven required dying in a state of grace. Based on Christ's parable on the Last Judgement, the church emphasized the performance of charitable acts by the baptized faithful, such as feeding the hungry and visiting the sick, as an important co-condition of salvation.

Villagers and urban laypeople were frequently members of confraternities (such as the Archconfraternity of the Gonfalone), (Note: According to historian Konrad Eisenbichler, "After the State and the Church, the most well-organised membership system of medieval and early modern Europe was the confraternity—an association of lay persons who gathered regularly to pray and carry out a charitable activity. In cities, towns, and villages it would have been difficult for someone not to be a member of a confraternity, a benefactor of a confraternity's charitable work, or, at the very least, not to be aware of a confraternity's presence in the community." Another historian notes that confraternities were "the most sweeping and ubiquitous movement of the central and later Middle Ages".) mutual-support religious guilds associated with a saint, or religious fraternities (such as the Third Order of Saint Francis). The faithful made pilgrimages to saints' shrines, but the proliferation in the saints' number undermined their reputation. (Note: Saints were often supposed to assist those who faithfully supplicated and venerated them. There were occurrences where disappointed farmers who thought that an agricultural saint had unjustly failed to assist the weather or harvest dragged down his or her statue or spattered it with mud.) There was a strong non-theological Biblical awareness, (Note: Historian Frans van Liere asserts that "One cannot understand the medieval world without appreciating the scope of medieval people's engagement with biblical stories, characters, and images.[...]It is a common misconception, especially in Protestant circles, that people (or, at least, the "common" people) in the Middle Ages did not read the Bible." Even in the early Middle Ages, "many people, clergy and laity alike, may have been able to read but not write, and even those who could not were not entirely cut off from the written word, because they could have others read it to them.[...]There was both more illiteracy among the clergy, and more literacy among the laity, than is often supposed.[...]Most medieval Christians came to know the Bible not by reading, but by hearing it." Historian Eyal Poleg "rejects the Reformers' image of a medieval laity denied access to the Bible. Mediation provided all groups in society, lay and clerical both, with an approach to the Bible, though the understanding of what the Bible was differed for different groups." For historian Andrew Gow, "the circulation of vernacular Bibles in late medieval Germany was abundant and ample and thanks to a well-organised manuscript production and the early success of printed press highly accessible to lay people, in particular those living in an urban environment.") especially of the Gospels and Psalms.

New religious movements promoted the deeper involvement of laity in religious practices. The communal fraternities of the Brethren of the Common Life did not encourage lay brothers to become priests and often placed their houses under the protection of urban authorities. They were closely associated with the devotio moderna, a new method of Catholic spirituality with a special emphasis on the education of laypeople. A leader of the movement the Dutch Wessel Gansfort (d. 1489) attacked abuses of indulgences.

Church buildings were richly decorated with paintings, sculptures, and stained glass windows. While Romanesque and Gothic art made a clear distinction between the supernatural and the human, Renaissance artists depicted God and the saints in a more human way. Historian Caroline Walker Bynum has written of 'a sort of religious materialism' in the period: 'a frenzied conviction that the divine tended to erupt into matter'.

==== Sources of authority ====
The sources of religious authority included the Bible and its authoritative commentaries, apostolic tradition, decisions by ecumenical councils, scholastic theology, and papal authority. Catholics regarded the Vulgate as the Bible's authentic Latin translation. Commentators applied several methods of interpretations to resolve contradictions within the Bible. (Note: For instance, Catholic commentators read the Law of Moses in a symbolic or mystical sense thinking that the Jewish ceremonies and laws were irrelevant for Christians.) Apostolic tradition verified religious practices with unclear Biblical foundations or which required deduction, such as infant baptism. The ecumenical councils' decisions were binding to all Catholics. The crucial elements of mainstream Christianity had been first summarised in the Nicene Creed in 325. Its western text contained a unilateral addition which contributed to the schism between Catholicism and Eastern Orthodoxy. The Creed contained the dogma of Trinity about one God uniting three equal persons: Father, Son, and Holy Spirit. Church authorities acknowledged that an individual might exceptionally receive direct revelations from God but maintained that a genuine revelation could not challenge traditional religious principles. (Note: A notable example was the Dominican nun Catherine of Siena (d. 1380) whose revelations convinced Pope Gregory XI to return his seat from Avignon to Rome.) Preaching was an important part of bishops' and priests' responsibilities. (Note: There are over 140,000 sermons, given or transcribed into Latin, still extant just from 1150 to 1350.)

==== Clergy ====
Western Christianity displayed a remarkable unity. This was the outcome of the Gregorian Reform that established papal supremacy over the Catholic Church, and achieved the legal separation of the Catholic clergy from laity. (Note: The medieval Church operated its own legal system and Roman-law-derived laws and procedures in parallel with the local secular state's legal system: bishops had courts, officers, guards, prisons, etc. These ecclesiastical courts protected priests and religious in various ways from the reach of the distrusted local secular courts and laws, or dealt with laity on issues relating to sacraments, notably marriage and divorce. As well, the Church claimed, but was not always allowed, jurisdiction "over any dispute that arose because one person allegedly wronged another, jurisdiction to protect the poor and unbefriended, and jurisdiction to compensate for the failure of the civil authorities to do justice,[...]and over hard and doubtful cases." On many issues, appeals could be made to the Pope. In England, a parallel parliament for the clergy even arose, largely to keep their taxes independent, but distinct from the citizens' Parliament: the Convocations of Canterbury and York.) Clerical celibacy was reinforced through the prohibition of clerical marriage; ecclesiastical courts were granted exclusive jurisdiction over clerics, and also over matrimonial causes. Priests were ordained by bishops in accordance with the principle of apostolic succession—a claim to the uninterrupted transmission of their consecrating power from Christ's Apostles through generations of bishops. Bishops, abbots, abbesses, and other prelates might possess remarkable wealth. Some of the ecclesiastic leaders also functioned as local secular princes, such as the prince-bishops in Kingdom of Germany and the English County Palatine of Durham, and the Grand Masters of the Teutonic Knights in their Baltic Ordensstaat. Other prelates might be regents or the power behind the throne. (Note: Examples of exceptionally influential prelates include the Spanish cardinal Francisco Jiménez de Cisneros (d. 1517), and the German archbishop Matthäus Lang (d. 1540).) Believers were expected to pay the tithe (one tenth of their income) to the church. Pluralism—the practice of holding multiple church offices (or benefices)—was not unusual. This led to non-residence, and the absent priests' deputies were often poorly educated and underpaid.

The clergy consisted of two major groups, the regular clergy and the secular clergy. Regular clerics lived under a monastic rule within the framework of a religious order; secular clerics were responsible for pastoral care. The church was a hierarchical organisation. The pope was elected by high-ranking clergymen, the cardinals, and assisted by the professional staff of the Roman Curia. Secular clerics were organised into territorial units known as dioceses, each ruled by a bishop or archbishop. (Note: The archbishops were also the heads of ecclesiastical provinces that included several dioceses.) Each diocese was divided into parishes headed by parish priests who administered most sacraments to the faithful. These were sacred rites thought to transfer divine grace to humankind. The Council of Florence declared baptism, confirmation, marriage, extreme unction, penance, the Eucharist, and priestly ordination as the seven sacraments of the Catholic Church. Women were not ordained priests but could live as nuns in convents after taking the three monastic vows of poverty, chastity, and obedience.

==== Papacy ====
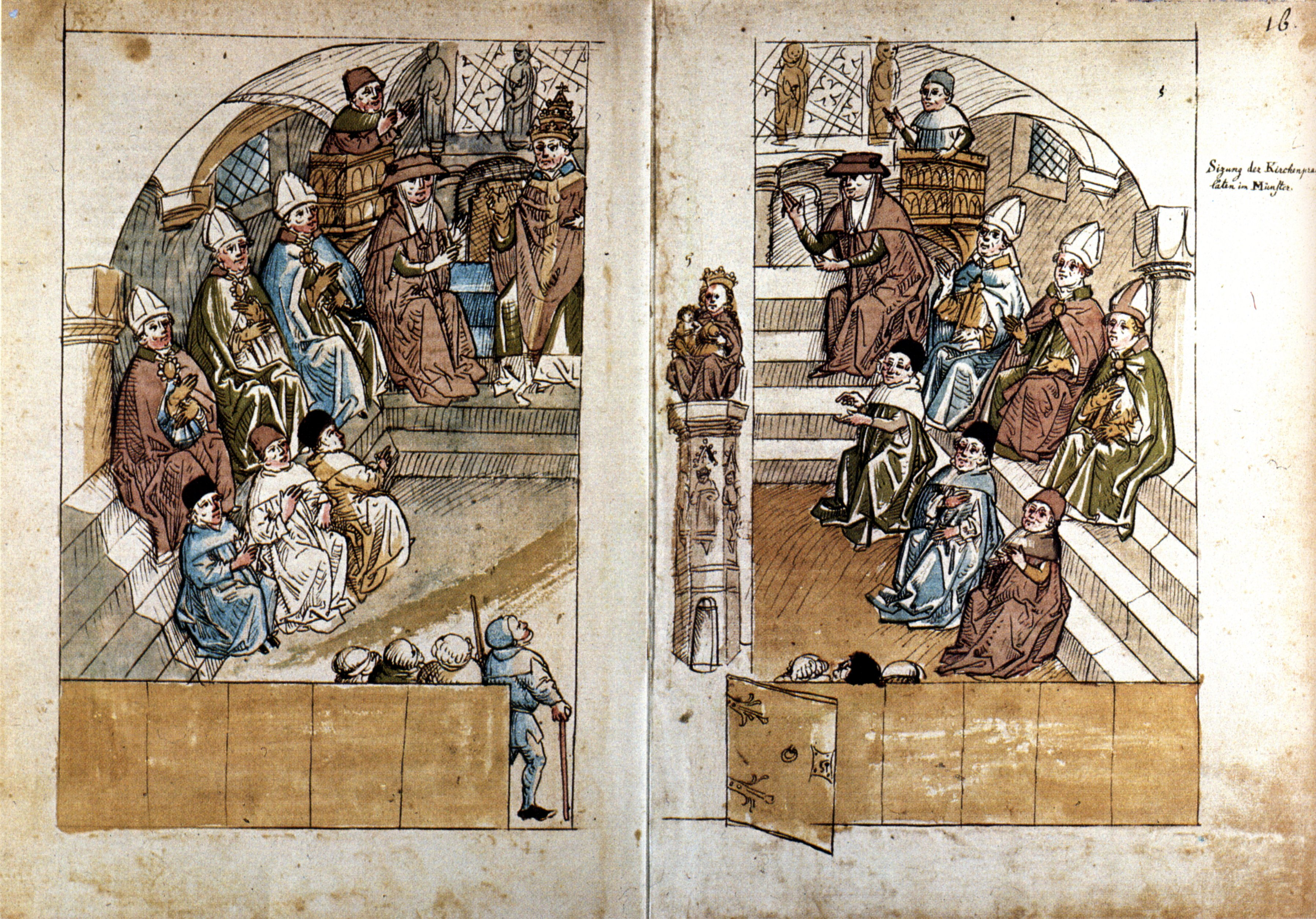
Meeting of cardinals, bishops and theologians with Antipope John XXIII (r. 1410–1415) at the Council of Constance (from the Chronicle of the Council of Constance by Ulrich of Richenthal)

The authority of the papacy was based on a well-organised system of communication and bureaucracy. The popes claimed the power of binding and loosing that Christ had reportedly granted to Peter the Apostle (d. c. 66), and offered indulgence—the reduction of the penalty in both this world (penance) and in Purgatory to contrite and pardoned sinners who e.g. gave alms or went on pilgrimages. The popes also granted dispensations to institutions or individuals, exempting them from certain provisions of canon law (or ecclesiastic law). (Note: For instance, religious orders were regularly exempted of the authority of the bishops, or elderly laypeople could be released of the obligation of fasting.)

From 1309 to 1417, the papacy was in turmoil: various election controversies resulted in the Western Schism (1378–1417) leading to, at the end, three rival claimant popes. At the Council of Constance, one of the three popes resigned, his two rivals were deposed, and the newly elected Martin V (r. 1417–1431) was acknowledged as the legitimate pope throughout Catholic Europe. The relative authority of popes and ecumenical councils was in contest.

The Renaissance popes were also secular rulers: as princes of the Papal States in Italy, the popes were deeply involved in the power struggles of the peninsula, and the Italian noble houses vied for election. These popes frequently caused scandal: Pope Alexander VI (r. 1492–1503) appointed his relatives, among them his own illegitimate sons to high offices; Pope Julius II (r. 1503–1513) took up arms to recover papal territories lost during his predecessors' reign, prompting the underground satire Julius Excluded from Heaven.

In the early Age of Exploration, a succession of popes (Nicholas V, Sixtus IV, Alexander VI) successfully arbitrated territorial disputes between Spain and Portugal outside Europe, notably with the papal bull Inter caetera (1493) drawing a line through South America to separate their trade and colonial regions. The Spanish and Portuguese conquests and developing trade networks contributed to the global expansion of Catholicism. (Note: The baptism of Nzinga a Nkuwu, King of Kongo (r. 1470–1509) in 1491 is the earliest example. By the end of the rule of his son Alfonso I (r. 1509–1543), about 2 million people received baptism in Kongo.)

The popes were generous patrons of art and architecture. Julius II ordered the demolition of the ruined 4th-century St. Peter's Basilica in preparation for the building of a new Renaissance basilica, creating a financial problem.

==== Partial and failed institutional reforms ====
The necessity of a church reform in capite et membris ('in head and limbs') was frequently discussed at the ecumenical councils from the late 13th century. However, many high stakeholders—popes, prelates, abbots and kings—preferred the status quo because they did not want to lose privileges or revenues. The system of papal dispensations proved a continual obstacle to the implementation of each revived reform attempt, as the Holy See had regularly granted privileges or immunities.

Within regular clergy, the so-called "congregations of strict observance" spread. These were monastic communities that returned to the strict interpretation of their order's rule. (Note: A good example is the Benedictine congregation that began with the reform of monastic life at the Abbey of Santa Giustina in Padua under the auspices of the Venetian nobleman Ludovico Barbo (d. 1443). By 1505, the congregation included nearly 50 abbeys, and had an effect on the reform of further monasteries, such as Fontevraud Abbey and Marmoutier Abbey in France.) Reformist bishops tried to discipline their clergy through regular canonical visitations but their attempts mainly failed due to the resistance of autonomous institutions such as cathedral chapters. Neither could they exercise authority over non-resident clerics who had received their benefice from the papacy. On the eve of the Reformation, the Fifth Council of the Lateran was the last occasion when efforts to introduce a far-reaching reform from above could have achieved but it was dissolved in 1517 without making decisions on the issues that would soon come to the fore.

=== Humanism ===
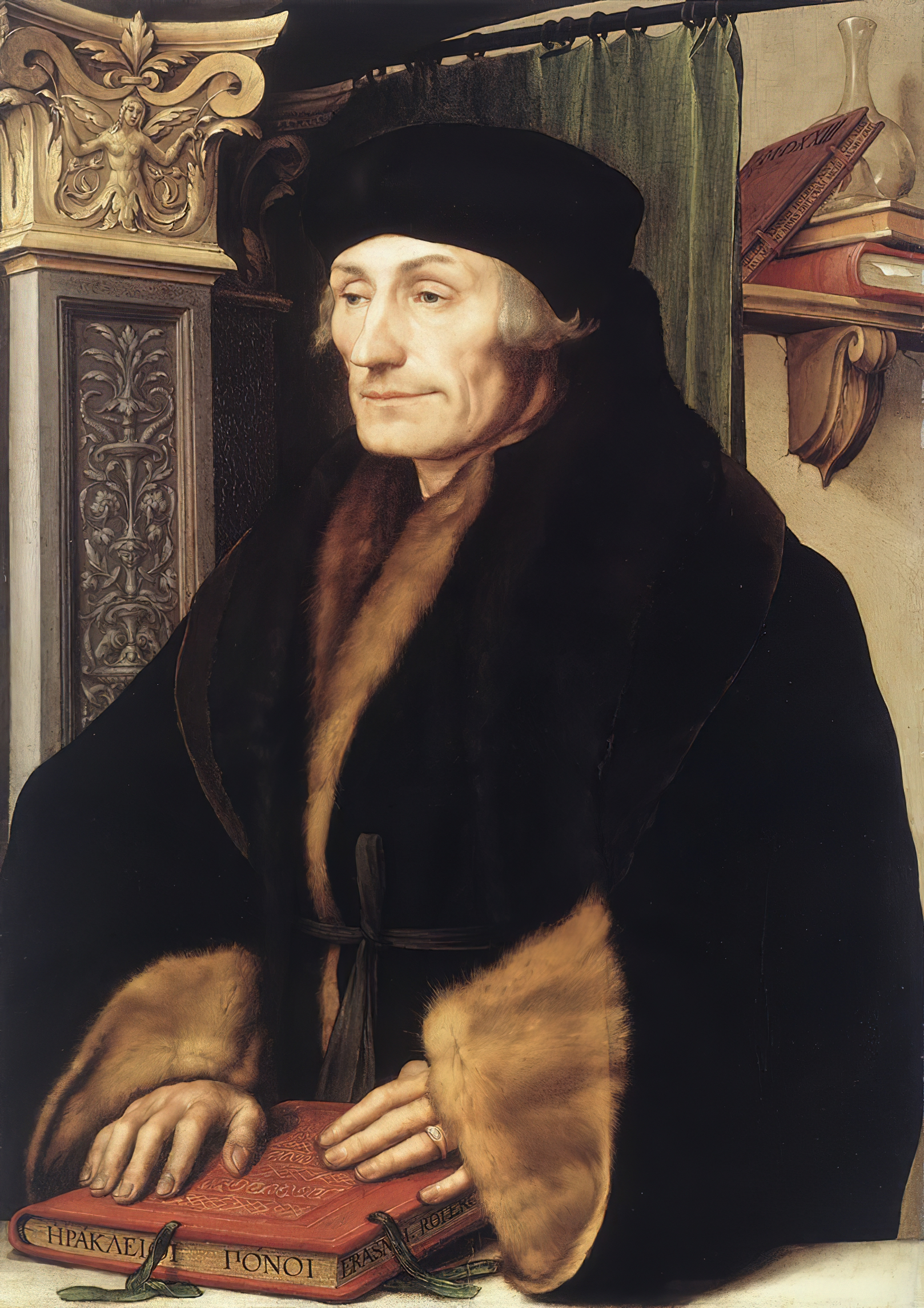
Portrait of Erasmus of Rotterdam by Hans Holbein the Younger (d. 1543)

A new intellectual movement known as Humanism emerged in the Late Middle Ages. The Humanists' slogan ad fontes! ('back to the sources!') demonstrated their enthusiasm for Classical texts and textual criticism. The rise of the Ottoman Empire led to the mass immigration of Byzantine scholars to Western Europe, and many of them brought manuscripts previously unknown to western scholarship. This led to the rediscovery of the Ancient Greek philosopher Plato (347/348 BC). Plato's ideas about an ultimate reality lying beyond visible reality posed a serious challenge to scholastic theologians' rigorous definitions. Textual criticism called into question the reliability of some of the fundamental texts of papal privilege: the humanist scholar, Lorenzo Valla (1407–1457) convincingly demonstrated that one of the basic documents of papal authority, the allegedly 4th-century Donation of Constantine, was a medieval forgery.

As the manufacturing of paper from rags and the printing machine with movable type were spreading in Europe, books could be bought at a reasonable price from the 15th century. (Note: The price of the books decreased by about 85 per cent after printing machines started to work.) Demand for religious literature was especially high. The German inventor Johannes Gutenberg (d. 1468) first published a two-volume printed version of the Vulgata in the early 1450s. High and Low German, Italian, Dutch, Spanish, Czech and Catalan translations of the Bible were published between 1466 and 1492; in France, the Bible's abridged French versions gained popularity. Laypeople who read the Bible could challenge their priests' sermons, as it happened already in 1515.

Completed by Jerome (d. 420), the Vulgate contained the Septuagint version of the Old Testament. The systematic study of Biblical manuscripts revealed that Jerome had sometimes misinterpreted his sources of translation. (Note: The Vulgate text of Exodus 34 is a well known case of Jerome's mistranslations: the Hebrew text writes of Moses's shining face when narrating the revelation of the Ten Commandments whereas Jerome describes Moses as wearing a pair of horns as he mistook a Hebrew function word.) A series of Latin-Greek editions of the New Testament was completed by the Dutch humanist Erasmus (d. 1536). These new Latin translations challenged some scriptural proof texts for some Catholic dogmas. (Note: For instance, Erasmus's translations did not support the traditional proof text for the concepts of infused grace and the treasury of merit, by choosing the adjective gratiosa ('gracious') instead of the traditional gratia plena ('full of grace') to address the Virgin Mary in the Latin text of the Hail Mary.)

=== Dissidents ===
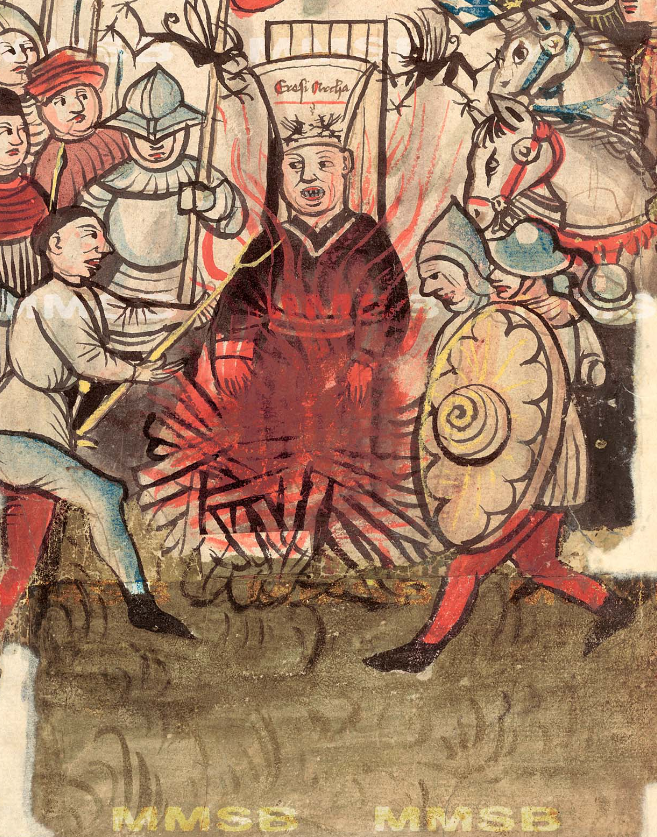
Burning of Jan Hus at Constance (from the Chronicle of the Council of Constance by Ulrich of Richenthal)

After Arianism—a Christological doctrine condemned as heresy at ecumenical councils—disappeared in the late 7th century, no major disputes menaced the theological unity of the Western Church. Religious enthusiasts could organise their followers into nonconformist groups but they disbanded after their founder died. (Note: One of the enthusiasts, Henry of Lausanne (d. c. 1148) persuaded French prostitutes to repent their sins, but opposed confessions, and attacked the wealth of the clergy. Although his calls for a church reform attracted many commoners, his movement quickly disintegrated when he died.) The Waldensians were a notable exception. Due to their efficient organisation, they survived not only the death of their founder Peter Waldo (d. c. 1205), but also a series of anti-heretic crusades. They rejected the clerics' monopoly of public ministry, and allowed all trained members of their community, men and women alike, to preach.

The Western Schism reinforced a general desire for church reform. The Oxford theologian John Wycliffe (d. 1384) was one of the most radical critics. He attacked pilgrimages, the veneration of saints, and the doctrine of transubstantiation. He regarded the Church as an exclusive community of those chosen by God to salvation, and argued that the state could seize the corrupt clerics' endowments. Known as Lollards, Wycliffe's followers rejected images, clerical celibacy and the purchase of indulgences by crusading lords. The Parliament of England passed a law against heretics, but Lollard communities survived the purges.

Wycliffe's theology had a marked impact on the Prague academic Jan Hus (d. 1415). He delivered popular sermons against the clerics' wealth and temporal powers, for which he was summoned to the Council of Constance. Although the German king Sigismund of Luxemburg (r. 1410–1437) had granted him safe conduct, Hus was sentenced to death for heresy and burned at the stake on 6 July 1415. His execution led to a nationwide religious movement in Bohemia, and the papacy called for a series of crusades against Hus's followers. The moderate Hussites, mainly Czech aristocrats and academics, were known as Utraquists for they taught that the Eucharist was to be administered sub utraque specie ('in both kinds') to the laity. The most radical Hussites, called Taborites after their new town of Tábor, held their property in common. Their millenarianism shocked the Utraquists who destroyed them in the Battle of Lipany in 1434. By this time, the remaining Catholic communities in Bohemia were almost exclusively German-speaking. The lack of a Hussite church hierarchy enabled the Czech aristocrats and urban magistrates to assume control of the Hussite clergy from the 1470s. The radical Hussites set up their own church known as the Union of Bohemian Brethren. They rejected the separation of clergy and laity, and condemned all forms of violence and oath taking.

Marshall writes that the Lollards, Hussites and conciliarist theologians "collectively give the lie to any suggestion that torpor and complacency were the hallmarks of religious life in the century before Martin Luther." Historians customarily refer to Wycliffe and Hus as "Forerunners of the Reformation". The two reformers' emphasis on the Bible is often regarded as an early example of one of the basic principles of the Reformation—the idea sola scriptura ('by the Scriptures alone'), although prominent scholastic theologians were also convinced that Scripture, interpreted reasonably and in accord with the Church and the Church Fathers, contained all knowledge necessary for salvation. (Note: For instance, Duns Scotus (d. 1308) stated that "theology does not concern anything except what is contained in Scripture, and what may be drawn from this," though this does not equate theology and Bibe study. Theologians associated with the Augustinian Order such as Gregory of Rimini rarely cited other sources of faith.)

== Beginnings ==
The Reformation in Germanic countries was instigated by Martin Luther, however historians note that many of his ideas were pre-dated by Wycliff, Huss, Erasmus, Zwingli and others, both heretic and orthodox. Historian Peter Marshall has noted "In recent decades, scholars have become increasingly acclimatized to the idea that the Reformation was in important respects a continuation and intensification of trends within later medieval Catholicism, rather than simply a wholesale rejection of it."

=== Luther and the Ninety-five Theses ===
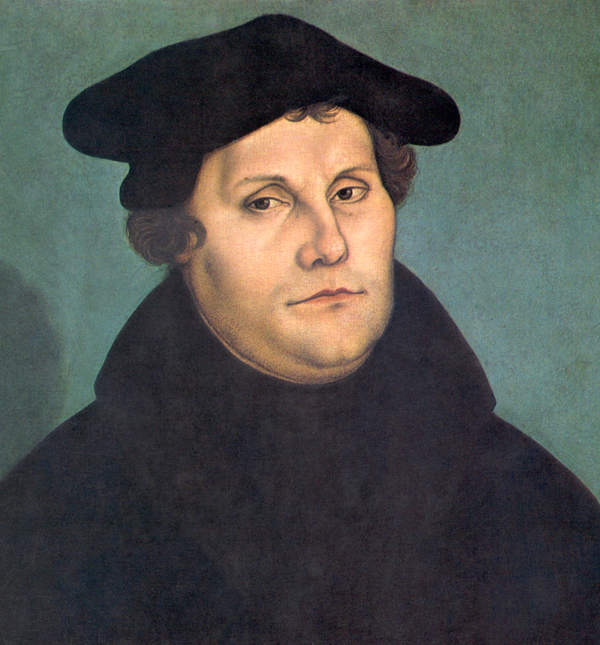
Portrait of Martin Luther (1529) by Lucas Cranach the Elder

Pope Leo X (r. 1513–1521) decided to complete the construction of the new St. Peter's Basilica in Rome, which had already started in 1506 under Pope Julius II. As the sale of certificates of indulgences had been a well-established method of papal fund raising, he announced a new plenary indulgence in the papal bull Sacrosanctis in 1515, intending to finance the construction. On the advice of the banker Jakob Fugger (d. 1525), he appointed the pluralist prelate Albert of Brandenburg (d. 1545) to supervise the sale campaign in Germany. (Note: A member of the Hohenzollern dynasty, Albert ruled the Archbishoprics of Mainz and Magdeburg and the Bishopric of Halberstadt simultaneously. He had borrowed money from Fugger to pay the fees to the Roman Curia for his appointment to the see of Mainz, and his share in the revenues from the sale of indulgences was expected to allow him to repay the loan.) The Dominican friar Johann Tetzel (d. 1519), the commissioner of indulgences in the dioceses of Magdeburg and Halberstadt since January 1517, applied unusually aggressive marketing methods. A slogan attributed to him famously claimed that "As soon as the coin into the box rings, a soul from purgatory to heaven springs". Frederick the Wise, Prince-elector of Saxony (r. 1486–1525) forbade the campaign because the Sacrosanctis suspended the sale of previous indulgences, depriving him of revenues that he had spent on his collection of relics. (Note: Frederick rebuilt the castle church at Wittenberg to store his collection of nearly 20,000 relics. This collection was thought to include a straw from the stable of the Nativity, the corpse of a holy innocent, and drops from the Virgin's breast milk.)

The campaign's vulgarity shocked many serious-minded believers, among them Martin Luther, a theology professor at the University of Wittenberg in Saxony. Born into a middle-class family, Luther entered an Augustinian monastery after a heavy thunderstorm dreadfully reminded him the risk of sudden death and eternal damnation, but his anxiety about his sinfulness did not abate. His studies on the works of the Late Roman theologian Augustine of Hippo (d. 430) convinced him that those whom God chose as his elect received a gift of faith independently of their acts. He first denounced the idea of justification through human efforts in his Disputatio contra scholasticam theologiam ('Disputation against Scholastic Theology') in September 1517.

On 31 October 1517, Luther addressed a letter to Albert of Brandenburg, stating that the clerics preaching the St. Peter's indulgences were deceiving the faithful, and attached his Ninety-five Theses to it. He questioned the efficacy of indulgences for the dead, although also stated "If ... indulgences were preached according to the spirit and intention of the pope, all ... doubts would be readily resolved". Archbishop Albert ordered the theologians at the University of Mainz to examine the document. Tetzel, and the theologians Konrad Wimpina (d. 1531) and Johann Eck (d. 1543) were the first to associate some of Luther's propositions with Hussitism. The case was soon forwarded to the Roman Curia for judgement. Pope Leo remained uninterested, and mentioned the case as "a quarrel among friars".

=== New theology ===
Luther on the Christian struggles toward God

Christians should be exhorted to seek earnestly to follow Christ, their Head, through penalties, deaths, hells. And let them thus be more confident of entering heaven through many tribulations rather than through a false assurance of peace.

— Martin Luther, Ninety-five Theses

As the historian Lyndal Roper notes, the "Reformation proceeded by a set of debates and arguments". Luther presented his views in public at the observant Augustinians' assembly in Heidelberg on 26 April 1518. Here he explained his "theology of the Cross" about a loving God who had become frail to save fallen humanity, contrasting it with what he saw as the scholastic "theology of glory" that in his view celebrated erudition and human acts. It is uncertain when Luther's concept of justification by faith alone—a central element of his theology—crystallised. He would later attribute it to his "tower experience" (Note: "Luther himself had said that he found his new insight "auff diser cloaca auff dem thurm" (on or over the toilet on the tower); however some historians dispute the account.) (1519), when he comprehended that God could freely declare even sinners righteous while he was thinking about the words of Paul the Apostle (d. 64 or 65)—"the just shall live by faith".

Urged by Luther's opponents, Pope Leo appointed the jurist Girolamo Ghinucci (d. 1541) and the theologian Sylvester Mazzolini (d. 1527) to inspect Luther's teaching. Mazzolini argued that Luther had questioned papal authority by attacking the indulgences, while Luther concluded that only a fundamental reform could put an end to the abuse of indulgences. Pope Leo did not excommunicate Luther because Leo did not want to alienate Luther's patron Frederick the Wise. (Note: Luther's friendship with Frederick's secretary George Spalatin (d. 1545) secured him Frederick's favour, and Leo X wanted to influence the forthcoming imperial election with Frederick's assistance.) Instead, he appointed Cardinal Thomas Cajetan (d. 1534) to convince Luther to withdraw some of his theses. Cajetan met with Luther at Augsburg in October 1518. The historian Berndt Hamm says that the meeting was the "historical point at which the opposition between the Reformation and Catholicism first emerged", (Note: Historian Volker Leppin writes "anti-Catholicism does not lie at the root of Reformation, even if later on it obviously became part of the whole Reformation framework," but notes "the anti-Catholic tendency of Luther research".) as Cajetan thought that believers accepting Luther's views of justification would no more obey clerical guidance.

Luther first expressed his sympathy for Jan Hus at a disputation in Leipzig in June 1519. His case was reopened at the Roman Curia. Cajetan, Eck and other papal officials drafted the papal bull Exsurge Domine ('Arise, O Lord') which was published on 15 June 1520. It condemned Luther's forty-one theses, and offered a sixty-day-long grace period to him to recant. Luther's theology quickly developed. In a Latin treatise On the Babylonian Captivity of the Church (October 1520), he stated that only baptism and the Eucharist could be regarded as sacraments, and priests were not members of a privileged class but servants of the community (hence they became called ministers from the Latin word for servant). His German manifesto To the Christian Nobility of the German Nation (August 1520) associated the papacy with the Antichrist, and described the Holy See as "the worst whorehouse of all whorehouses" in reference to the funds flowing to the Roman Curia. It also challenged the Biblical justification of clerical celibacy. Luther's study On the Freedom of a Christian (November 1520) consolidated his thoughts about the believers' inner freedom with their obligation to care for their neighbours although he rejected the traditional teaching about good works. The study is a characteristic example of Luther's enthusiasm for paradoxes. (Note: For instance, he stated that "A Christian is a perfectly free lord of all, subject to none. A Christian is a perfectly dutiful servant of all, subject to all.")

Ein' feste Burg ist unser Gott ('A Mighty Fortress Is Our God') sung in German
The German text of Luther's hymn Ein' feste Burg ist unser Gott sung to the isometric, more widely known arrangement of its traditional melody.

The papal nuncio Girolamo Aleandro (d. 1542) ordered the burning of Luther's books. In response, Luther and his followers burned the papal bull along with a copy of the Corpus Juris Canonici—the fundamental document of medieval ecclesiastic law—at Wittenberg. The papal bull excommunicating Luther was published on 3 January 1521. The newly elected Holy Roman Emperor Charles V (r. 1519–1556) wanted to outlaw Luther at the Diet of Worms, but could not make the decision alone. The Holy Roman Empire was a confederation of autonomous states, and authority rested with the Imperial Diets where the Imperial Estates assembled. Frederick the Wise vetoed the imperial ban against Luther, and Luther was summoned to Worms to defend his case at the Diet in April 1521. Here he refused to recant stating that only arguments from the Bible could convince him that his works contained errors.

After Luther and his supporters left the Diet, those who remained sanctioned the imperial ban, threatening Luther's supporters with imprisonment and confiscation of their property. To save Luther's life but also to hide his involvement, Frederick arranged Luther's abduction on 4 May. During his ten-month-long staged captivity at Frederick's castle of Wartburg, Luther translated the New Testament to High German. The historian Diarmaid MacCulloch describes the translation as an "extraordinary achievement that has shaped the German language ever since", adding that "Luther's gift was for seizing the emotion with sudden, urgent phrases". The translation would be published at the 1522 Leipzig Book Fair along with Luther's treatise On Monastic Vows that laid the theological foundations of the dissolution of monasteries. Luther also composed religious hymns in Wartburg. They would be first published in collections in 1524. During Luther's absence, his co-workers, primarily Philip Melanchthon (d. 1560) and Andreas Karlstadt (d. 1541) assumed the leadership of Reformation in Wittenberg. Melanchthon consolidated Luther's thoughts into a coherent theological work titled Loci communes ('Common Places').

=== Spread ===
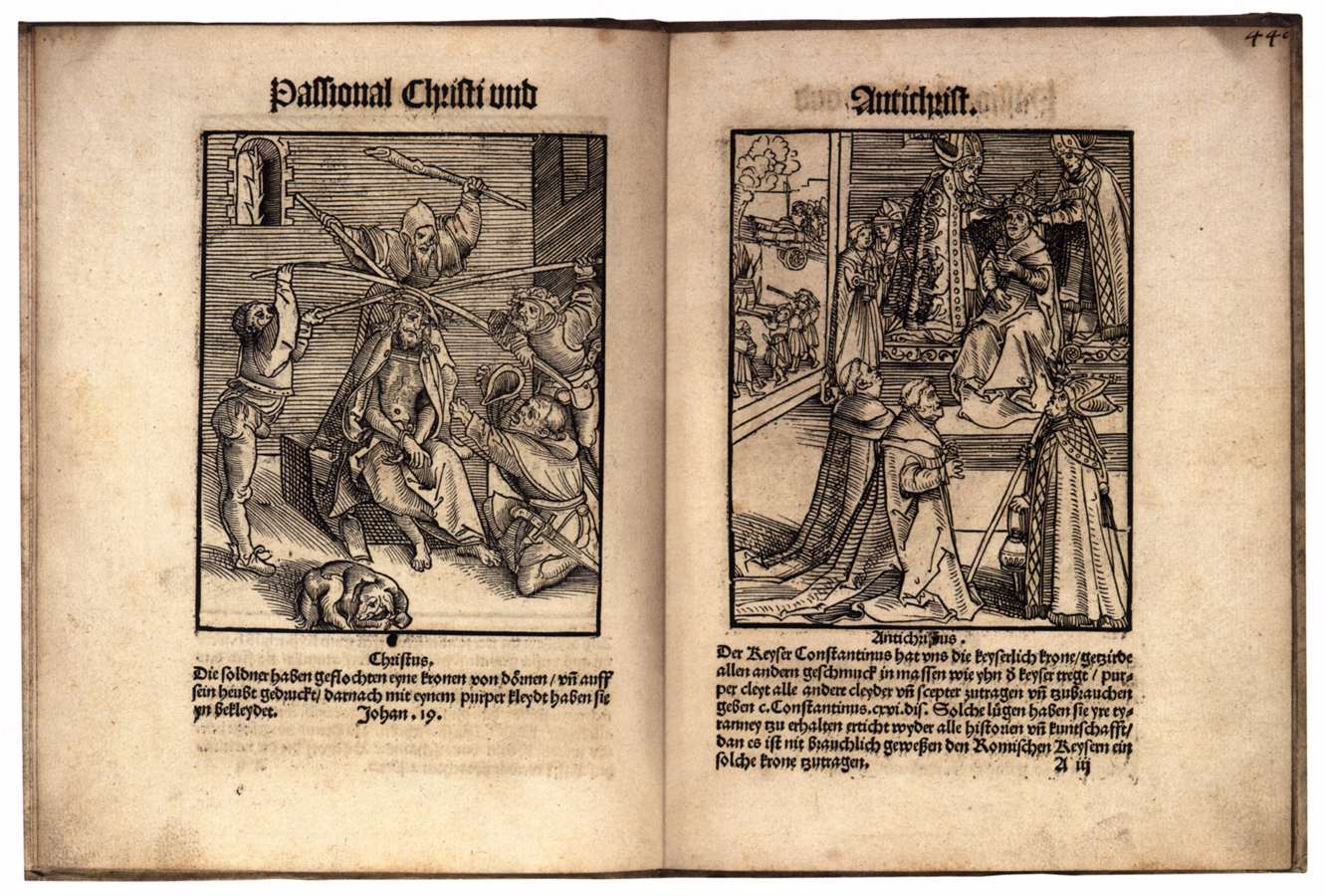
Woodcuts by Lucas Cranach the Elder from the Passional of Christ and Antichrist, contrasting Christ who wears the Crown of Thorns and is mocked (on the left), with the pope crowned with a tiara and adored by bishops and abbots (on the right)

==== Printing ====
Roper argues that "the most important reason why Luther did not meet with Hus's fate was technology: the new medium of print". Luther was publishing his views in short but pungent treatises that gained unexpected popularity: he was responsible for about one-fifth of all works printed in Germany in the first third of the 16th century. (Note: Between 1517 and 1520, Luther completed 30 treatises, and more than 300,000 of their copies were sold.) German printing presses were scattered in many urban centers which prevented their control by central authorities. Statistical analysis indicates a significant correlation between the presence of a printing press in a German city and the adoption of Reformation. (Note: According to an econometric analysis by the economist Jared Rubin, "the mere presence of a printing press prior to 1500 increased the probability that a city would become Protestant in 1530 by 52.1 percentage points, Protestant in 1560 by 43.6 percentage points, and Protestant in 1600 by 28.7 percentage points." Cities with a competitive printing market were even more likely to accept new theologies.)

Luther and many of his followers worked with the artist Lucas Cranach the Elder (d. 1553) who had a keen sense of visualising their message. He produced Luther's idealised portrait setting a template for further popular images printed on the covers of books. Cranach's woodcuts together with itinerant preachers' explanations helped the mainly illiterate people to understand Luther's teaching. The illustrated pamphlets were carried from place to place typically by peddlers and merchants. Laypeople started to discuss various aspects of religion in both private and public all over Germany.

==== Preachers ====
Reformation also spread through the activities of enthusiastic preachers such as Johannes Oecolampadius (d. 1531) and Konrad Kürsner (d. 1556) in Basel, Sebastian Hofmeister (d. 1533) in Schaffhausen, and Matthäus Zell (d. 1548) and Martin Bucer (d. 1551) in Strasbourg. They were called "Evangelicals" due to their insistence on teaching in accordance with the Gospels (or Evangelion). The Evangelical preachers emphasized that many well-established church practices had no precedent in the Bible, which they considered necessary. They offered the Eucharist to the laity in both kinds, and denied the clerics' monopolies, which resonated with popular anti-clericalism.

==== Cities ====
The self-governing free imperial cities were the first centers of the Reformation. In some cities such as Strasbourg and Ulm, the urban magistrates supported the Reformation; in the cities of the Hanseatic League the affluent middle classes enforced changes in church life. Cities located closer to the most important ideological centers of the Reformation—Wittenberg and Basel—adopted its ideas more likely than other towns. This indicates the significance either of student networks, or of neighbours who had rejected Catholicism.

==== Conflict and Control ====
The sociologist Steven Pfaff underlines that "ecclesiastical and liturgical reform was not simply a religious question ... since the sort of reforms demanded by Evangelicals could not be accommodated within existing institutions, prevailing customs, or established law". It was not unusual that their supporters attacked clerics and church buildings. Violent iconoclasm was common. (Note: "Sixteenth-century Protestants and Catholics knew that iconoclasm was not simply a byproduct of the Reformation, or a violent spasm, but its very essence.")

After their triumph, the reformers expelled their leading opponents, dissolved the monasteries and convents, secured the urban magistrates' control of the appointment of priests, and established new civic institutions. Evangelical town councils usually prohibited begging but established a common chest for poverty relief by expropriating the property of dissolved ecclesiastic institutions. The funds were used for the daily support of orphans, old people and the sick, but also for low-interest loans to the impoverished to start a business. Luther was convinced that only educated people could effectively serve both God and the community. Under his auspices, public schools and libraries were opened in many towns offering education to more children than the traditional monastic and cathedral schools.

=== Resistance and oppression ===
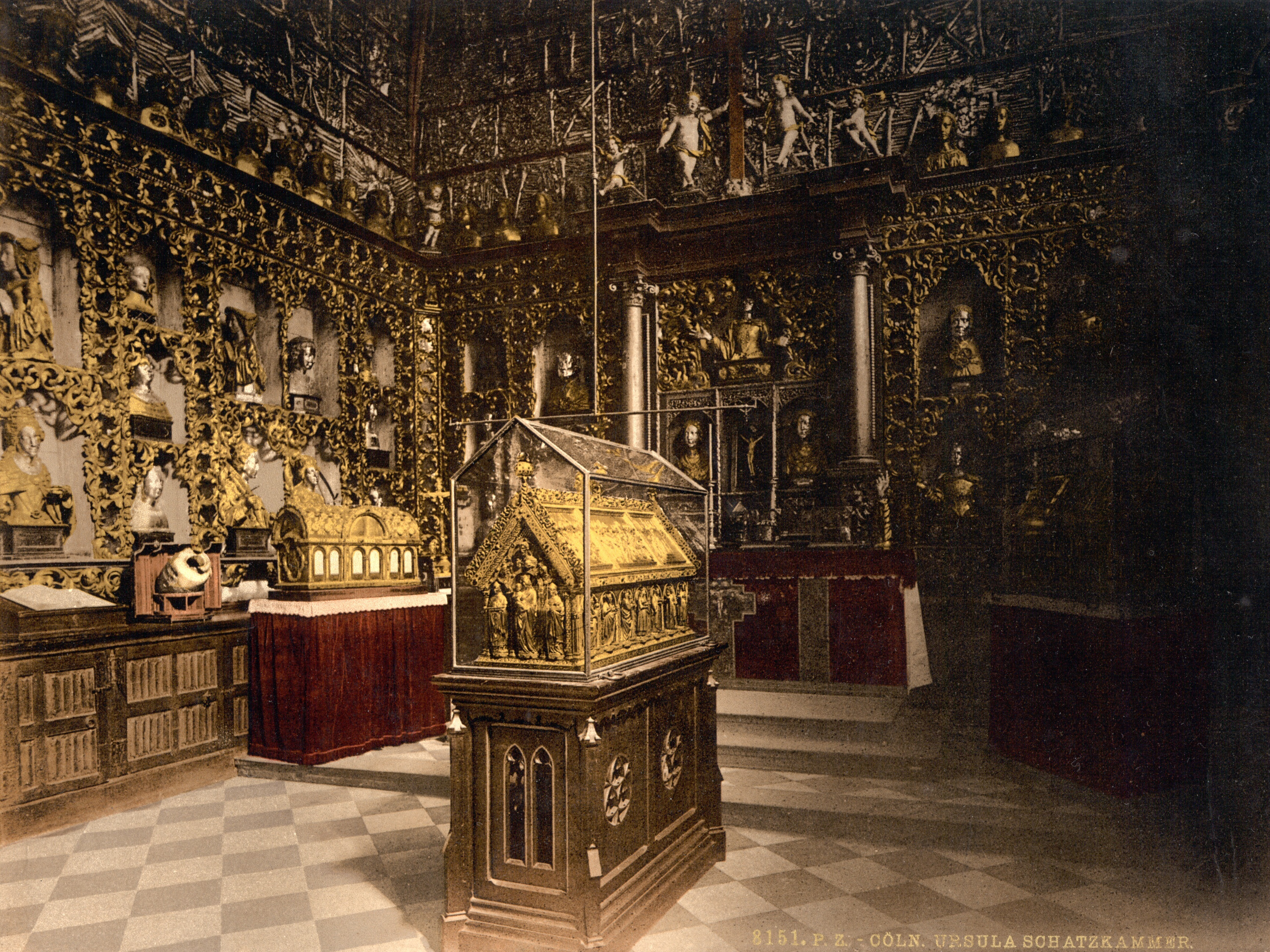
Treasury of Saint Ursula in the Basilica of St. Ursula, Cologne. Her popular cult contributed to the townspeople's resistance to Evangelical proselytism in Cologne.

Resistance to Evangelical preaching was significant in Flanders, the Rhineland, Bavaria and Austria. Here the veneration of local saints was strong, and statistical analysis indicates that cities where indigenous saints' shrines served as centers of vivid communal cults less likely adopted Reformation. (Note: Pfaff demonstrates in a study that the presence of a local saint's shrine in a city doubled the likelihood of resisting the Reformation.) Likewise, cities with an episcopal see or monasteries more likely resisted Evangelical proselytism.

Luther's ideas were rejected by most representatives of the previous generation of Humanists. Erasmus stated that Luther's "unrestrained enthusiasm carries him beyond what is right". Jacob van Hoogstraaten (d. 1527) compared Luther's theology of salvation "as if Christ takes to himself the most foul bride and is unconcerned about her cleanliness". Luther's works were burned in most European countries. Emperor Charles initiated the execution of the first Evangelical martyrs, the Augustinian monks Jan van Essen and Hendrik Vos. They were burned in Brussels on 1 July 1523. Charles was determined to protect the Catholic Church, but the Ottoman Turks' expansion towards Central Europe often thwarted him. The Spanish Inquisition prevented the spread of Evangelical literature in that country, and suppressed the spiritual movement of the Alumbrados ('Illuminists') who put a special emphasis on personal faith. Some Italian men of letters, such as the Venetian nobleman Gasparo Contarini (d. 1542) and the Augustinian canon Peter Martyr Vermigli (d. 1562) expressed ideas resembling Luther's theology of salvation but did not quickly break with Catholicism. (Note: Contarini, according to his own words, "changed from great fear and suffering to happpiness" when he concluded, after counsel from a saintly monk on Holy Saturday 1511, that reliance on asceticism or penances was insufficient, unnecessary and counter-productive however he did not hold Luther's position on, e.g., the sinfulness of good works.) They were part of a group known as Spirituali.

The English king Henry VIII (r. 1509–1547) commissioned a team of theologians to defend the Catholic dogmas against Luther's attacks. Their treatise titled The Assertion of the Seven Sacraments was published under Henry's name, and the grateful Pope awarded him with the title Defender of the Faith. In Scotland, the first Evangelical preacher Patrick Hamilton (d. 1528) was burned for heresy. In France, the theologians of the Sorbonne stated that Luther "vomited up a doctrine of pestilence". Guillaume Briçonnet (d. 1534), Bishop of Meaux, also condemned Luther but employed reform-minded clerics like Jacques Lefèvre d'Étaples (d. c. 1536) and William Farel (d. 1565) to renew religious life in his diocese. They enjoyed the protection of Marguerite of Angoulême (d. 1549), the well-educated sister of the French king Francis I (r. 1515–1547). The Parlement of Paris only took actions against them after Francis was captured in the Battle of Pavia in 1525, forcing many of them into exile.

Correspondence between Luke of Prague (d. 1528), leader of the Bohemian Brethren, and Luther made it clear that their theologies were incompatible even if their views about justification were similar. In Bohemia, Hungary, and Poland, Luther's theology spread in the local German communities. King Louis of Bohemia and Hungary (r. 1516–1526) ordered the persecution of Evangelical preachers although his wife Mary of Austria (d. 1558) favoured the reformers. Sigismund I the Old, King of Poland and Grand Duke of Lithuania (r. 1506–1548) banned the import of Evangelical literature. Christian II, who ruled the Kalmar Union of Denmark, Sweden, and Norway (r. 1513–1523), was sympathetic towards the Reformation but his despotic methods led to revolts. He was replaced by his uncle Frederick I in Denmark and Norway (r. 1523–1533), and by a local aristocrat Gustav I Vasa in Sweden (r. 1523–1560).

== Alternatives ==
=== Saxon radicals and rebellious knights ===
Andreas Karlstadt accelerated the implementation of Reformation in Wittenberg. On Christmas Day 1521, he administered the Eucharist in common garment; the next day he announced his engagement to a fifteen-year-old noble girl Anna von Mochau. He proclaimed that images were examples of "devilish deceit" which led to the mass destruction of religious art. Enthusiasts began swarming to Wittenberg. The Zwickau prophets, who had been incited by the radical preacher Thomas Müntzer (d. 1525), claimed that they had received revelations from God. They rejected transubstantiation and attacked infant baptism. Luther defended art as a proof of the beauty of the Creation, maintained that Christ's Body and Blood were physically present in the Eucharist, (Note: Luther compared the physical presence of the Body and Blood of Christ in the Eucharist to the heating of a piece of iron that changes its physical features.) and regarded infant baptism as a sign of membership in the Christian community. (Note: Luther likened infant baptism to the circumcision of Jewish male infants prescribed in the Book of Genesis. His radical opponents would emphasize that the command of circumcision could not justify the baptism of infant girls.) To put an end to the anarchy, Frederick the Wise released Luther in March 1522. Luther achieved the Zwickau prophets' removal from Wittenberg, calling them fanatics. Karlstadt voluntarily left Wittenberg for Orlamünde where the local congregation elected him its minister. Luther visited most parishes in the region to prevent radical reforms, but he was often received by verbal or physical abuses. When he wanted to dismiss Karlstadt, the parishioners referred to his own words about the congregations' right to freely elect their ministers, and Karlstadt called him a "perverter of the Scriptures". Karlstadt was expelled from Electoral Saxony without a trial on Luther's initiative.

Luther condemned violence but some of his followers took up arms. Franz von Sickingen (d. 1523), an imperial knight from the Rhineland, formed an alliance with his peers against Richard von Greiffenklau, Archbishop-elector of Trier (r. 1511–1531), allegedly to lead the Archbishop's subjects "to evangelical, light laws and Christian freedom". Sickingen had demanded the restitution of monastic property to the grantors' descendants, stating that the secularisation of church property would also improve the poor peasants' situation. Sickingen and his associates attacked the archbishopric but failed at the siege of Trier. Sickingen was mortally wounded while defending his Nanstein Castle against the Archbishop's troops. Luther denounced Sickingen's violent acts. According to his "theory of two kingdoms", true Christians had to submit themselves to princely authority.

=== Zwingli ===
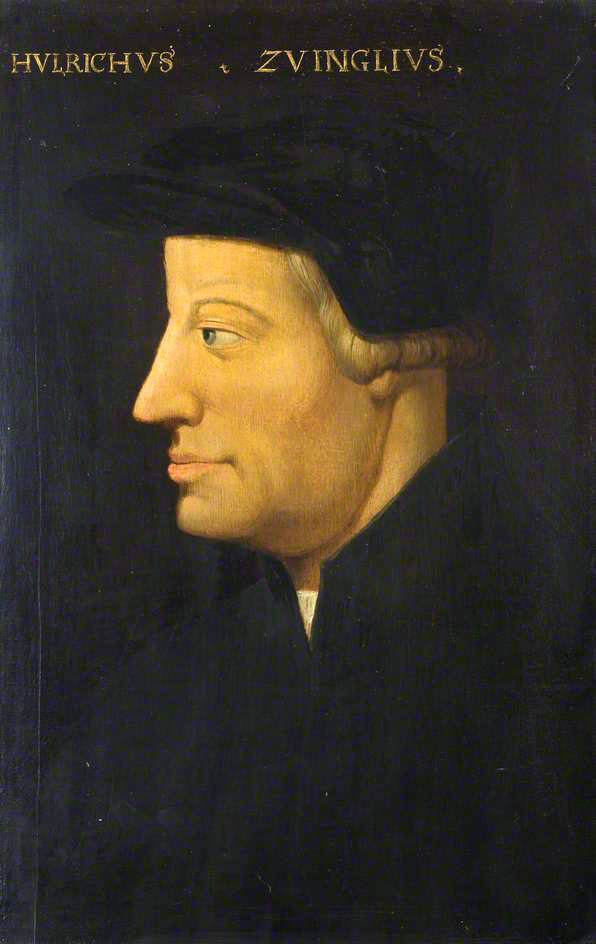
Huldrych Zwingli's 16th-century portrait by Hans Asper

The Swiss Humanist priest Huldrych Zwingli would claim that he "began to preach the Gospel of Christ in 1516 long before anyone in our region had ever heard of Luther". He came to prominence when he attended a meal of sausages in Zürich during Lent 1522, breaching the rules of fasting. He held disputations with the urban magistrates' authorization to discuss changes in church life, and always introduced them with the magistrates' support. In 1524, all images were removed from the churches, and fasting and clerical celibacy were abolished. Two years later, a German communion service replaced the Latin liturgy of the Mass, and the Eucharist (or Lord's Supper) was administered on a plain wooden table instead of an embellished altar. Two new institutions were organised in Zürich: the Prophezei (a public school for Biblical studies), and the Marriage and Morals Court (a legal court and moral police consisting of two laymen and two clerics). Both would be copied in other towns. Zwingli's interpretation of the Eucharist differed from both Catholic theology and Luther's teaching. He denied Christ's presence in the sacramental bread and wine, and regarded the Eucharist as a commemorative ceremony in honor of the crucified Jesus. The disagreement caused a bitter pamphlet war between Luther and Zwingli. They both rejected intermediary Eucharistic formulas coined by Bucer.

=== Swiss Brethren ===
Zwingli's cautious "Magisterial Reformation" outraged the more radical reformers, among them Conrad Grebel (d. 1526), a Zürich patrician's son who had fallen out with his family for marrying a low born girl. The radicals summarized their theology in a letter to Müntzer in 1524. They identified the Church as an exclusive community of the righteous, and demanded its liberation from the state. They deplored all religious practices that had no Biblical foundations, and endorsed believers' (or adult) baptism.

In January 1525, a former Catholic priest George Blaurock (d. 1529) asked Grebel to rebaptize him, and after his request was granted they rebaptized fifteen other people. For this practice, they were called Anabaptists ('rebaptizers'). As a featuring element of Donatism and other heretic movements, rebaptism had been a capital offence since the Late Roman period. After the magistrates had some radicals imprisoned, Blaurock called Zwingli the Antichrist. The town council enacted a law that threatened rebaptizers with capital punishment, and the Anabaptist Felix Manz (d. 1527) was condemned to death and drowned in the Limmat River. He was the first victim of religious persecution by reformist authorities. The purge convinced many Anabaptists that they were the true heirs to early Christians who had suffered martyrdom for their faith. The most radicals took inspiration from the Book of Daniel and the Book of Revelation for apocalyptic prophesies. Some of them burnt the Bible reciting St Paul's words, "the letter kills". In St. Gallen, Anabaptist women cut their hair short to avoid arousing sexual passion, while a housemaid Frena Bumenin proclaimed herself the New Messiah before announcing that she would give birth to the Antichrist.

According to Dr Kenneth R. Davis, "the Anabaptists can best be understood as, apart from their own creativity, a radicalization and Protestantization not of the Magisterial Reformation but of the lay-oriented, ascetic reformation of which Erasmus is the principle mediator."

=== Peasants' War ===
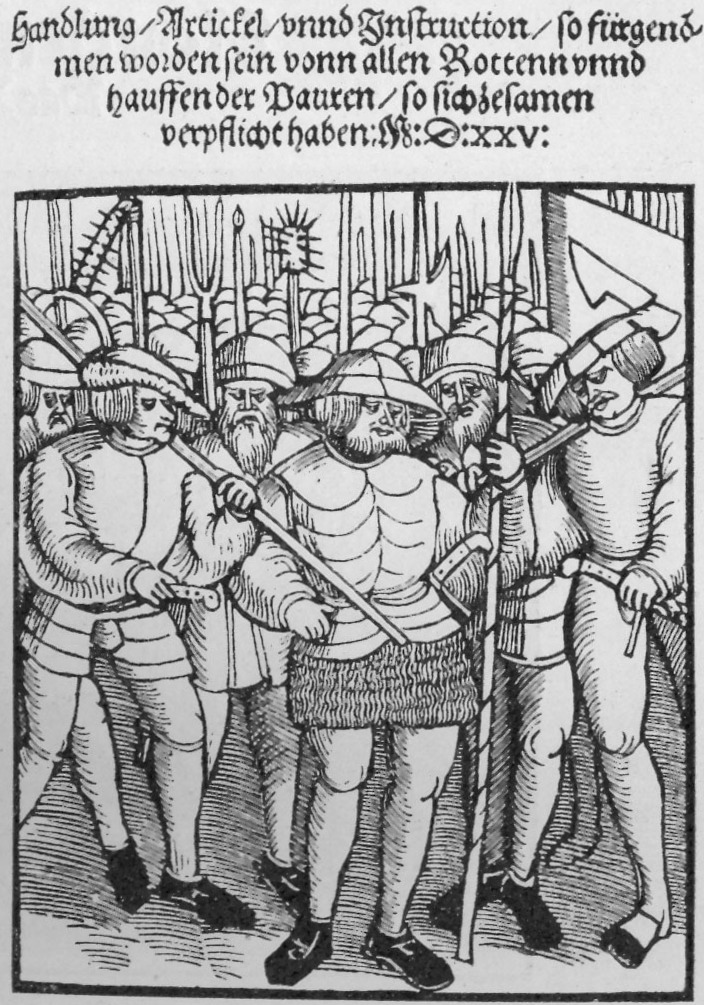
Title page of the Twelve Articles, a manifesto by Swabian peasants in March 1525

MacCulloch says that the Reformation "injected an extra element of instability" into the relationship between the peasants and their lords, as it raised "new excitement and bitterness against established authority". Public demonstrations in the Black Forest area indicated a general discontent among the southern German peasantry in May 1524. The Anabaptist preacher Balthasar Hubmaier (d. 1528) was one of the peasant leaders, but most participants never went beyond traditional anti-clericalism. In early 1525, the movement spread towards Upper Swabia. The radical preacher Cristopher Schappler and the pamphleteer Sebastian Lotzer summarized the Swabian peasants' demand in a manifesto known as Twelve Articles. The peasants wanted to control their ministers' election and to supervise the use of church revenues, but also demanded the abolition of the tithe on meat. They reserved the right to present further demands against non-Biblical seigneurial practices but promised to abandon any of their demands that contradicted the Bible, and appointed fourteen "arbitrators" to clarify divine law on the relationship between peasants and landlords. The arbitrators approached Luther, Zwingli, Melanchthon and other leaders of the Reformation for advice but none of them answered. Luther wrote a treatise, equally blaming the landlords for the oppression of the peasantry and the rebels for their arbitrary acts.

Georg Truchsess von Waldburg (d. 1531), commander of the army of the aristocratic Swabian League, achieved the dissolution of the peasant armies either by force or through negotiations. By this time the peasant movements reached Franconia and Thüringia. The Franconian peasants formed alliances with artisans and petty nobles such as Florian Geyer (d. 1525) against the patricians and the Prince-Bishopric of Würzburg but Truchsess forced them into submission. In Thüringia, Müntzer convinced 300 radicals that they were invincible but they were annihilated at Frankenhausen by Philip the Magnanimous, Landgrave of Hesse (r. 1509–1567) and George, Duke of Saxony (r. 1500–1539). Müntzer who had hidden in an attic before the battle was discovered and executed. News of atrocities by peasant bands and meetings with disrespectful peasants during a preaching tour outraged Luther while he was writing his treatise Against the Murderous, Thieving Hordes of Peasants. In it, he urged the German princes to "smite, slay, and slab" the rebels. Moderate observers felt aggrieved at his cruel words. They regarded as an especially tasteless act that Luther married Katharina von Bora (d. 1552), a former nun while the punitive actions against the peasantry were still in process. Further peasant movements began in other regions in Central Europe but they were pacified through concessions or suppressed by force before the end of 1525.

== Consolidation ==
=== Princely Reformation in Germany ===
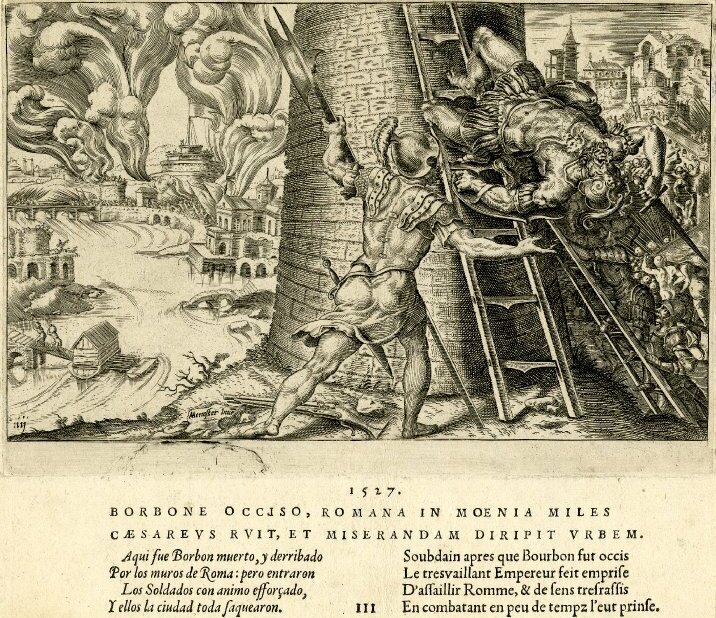
Sack of Rome in 1527 by Emperor Charles V's troops (1555) on a woodcut by Maarten van Heemskerck

The Grand Master of the Teutonic Knights Albert of Brandenburg-Ansbach (r. 1510–1525) was the first prince to formally abandon Catholicism. The Teutonic Order held Royal Prussia in fief of Poland. After defeats in a war against Poland and Lithuania demoralised the Knights, Albert transformed the region into the hereditary Duchy of Prussia in April 1525. As the secularisation of Prussia represented an open rebellion against Catholicism, it was followed by the establishment of the first Evangelical state church. In August, Albert's brothers, Casimir (r. 1515–1527) and George (r. 1536–1543) instructed the priests in Brandenburg-Kulmbach and Brandenburg-Ansbach to pray the doctrine of justification by faith alone. The Reformation was officially introduced in Electoral Saxony under John the Constant (r. 1525–1532) on Christmas Day 1525. Electoral Saxony's conversion facilitated the adoption of the Reformation in smaller German states, such as Mansfeld and Hessen. Philip of Hessen founded the first Evangelical university at his capital Marburg in 1527.

At the Diet of Speyer in 1526, the German princes agreed that they would "live, govern, and act in such a way as everyone trusted to justify before God and the Imperial Majesty". In practice, they sanctioned the principle cuius regio, eius religio ('whose realm, their religion'), acknowledging the princes' right to determine their subjects' religious affiliation. Fully occupied with the War of the League of Cognac against France and its Italian allies, Emperor Charles had appointed his brother Ferdinand I, Archduke of Austria (r. 1521–1564) to represent him in Germany. They both opposed the compromise, but Ferdinand was brought into succession struggles in Bohemia and Hungary after their brother-in-law King Louis died in the Battle of Mohács. In 1527, Charles's mutinous troops sacked Rome and took Pope Clement VII (r. 1523–1534) under custody. Luther stated that "Christ reigns in such a way that the emperor who persecutes Luther for the pope is forced to destroy the pope for Luther".

After his experiences with radical communities, Luther no more wrote of the congregations' right to elect their ministers (or pastors). Instead, he expected that princes acting as "emergency bishops" would prevent the disintegration of the church. Close cooperation between clerics and princely officials at church visitations paved the way for the establishment of the new church system. In Electoral Saxony, princely decrees enacted the Evangelical ideas. Liturgy was simplified, the church courts' jurisdiction over secular cases was abolished, and state authorities took control of church property. The Evangelical equivalent to bishop was created with the appointment of a former Catholic priest Johannes Bugenhagen (d. 1558) as superintendent in 1533. The church visitations convinced Luther that the villagers' knowledge of the Christian faith was imperfect. (Note: Many of the believers could not cite the Ten Commandments, the Apostles' Creed, or the Lord's Prayer.) To deal with the situation, he completed two cathecisms—the Large Catechism for the education of priests, and the Small Catechism for children. Records from Brandenburg-Ansbach indicates that Evangelical pastors often attacked traditional communal activities such as church fairs and spinning bees for debauchery.

Evangelical Imperial Estates on their protestation at the Diet of Speyer

"In matters concerning God's honor and our soul's salvation everyone must stand before God and answer by himself, nobody can excuse himself in that place by the actions of decisions of others whether they be a minority or majority."

— Five imperial princes and representatives of fourteen imperial cities, Protestation at Speyer (1529)

Taking advantage of Emperor Charles' victories in Italy, Ferdinand I achieved the reinforcement of the imperial ban against Luther at the Diet of Speyer in 1529. In response, five imperial princes and fourteen imperial cities (Note: The protestation was signed by John the Constant, Philip the Magnanimous, George of Brandenburg-Ansbach, Wolfgang, Prince of Anhalt-Köthen (r. 1508–1566), and Ernest I, Duke of Brunswick (r. 1527–1546), and the delegates of Strasbourg, Nuremberg, Ulm, Constance, Lindau, Memmingen, Kempten, Nördlingen, Heilbronn, Reutlingen, Isny im Allgäu, St. Gallen, Weissenburg (now Wissembourg, France), and Windesheim at Speyer.) presented a formal protestatio. They were mocked as "Protestants", and this appellation would be quickly applied to all followers of the new theologies. (Note: Although not unusual, the use of the appelation "Protestant" when describing events before 1529 is anachronistic.) To promote Protestant unity, Philip the Magnanimous organised a colloquy (or theological debate) between Luther, Melanchton, Zwingli and Oecolampadius at Marburg early in October 1529, but they could not coin a common formula on the Eucharist. During the discussion, Luther remarked that "Our spirit has nothing in common with your spirit", expressing the rift between the two mainstream versions of the Reformation. Zwingli's followers started to call themselves the "Reformed", as they regarded themselves as the true reformers.

=== Stalemate in Switzerland ===
In 1526, the villagers of the autonomous Graubünden region in Switzerland agreed that each village could freely choose between Protestantism and Catholicism, setting a precedent for the coexistence of the two denominations in the same jurisdiction. Religious affiliation in the Mandated Territories (lands jointly administered by the Swiss cantons) became the subject of much controversy between Protestant and Catholic cantons. The Protestant cantons concluded a military alliance early in 1529, the Catholic cantons in April. After a bloodless armed conflict, the Mandated communities were granted the right to choose between the two religions by a majority vote of the male citizens. Zwingli began an intensive proselityzing campaign which led to the conversion of most Mandated communities to Protestantism. He set up a council of clergymen and lay delegates for church administration, thus creating the forerunners of presbyteries. Zürich imposed an economic blockade on the Catholic cantons but the Catholics routed Zürich's army in 1531. The Catholics' victory stopped the Protestant expansion in Switzerland.

Zwingli was killed in the battlefield, and succeeded by a former monk Heinrich Bullinger (d. 1575) in Zürich. Bullinger developed Zwingli's Eucharistic formula in an attempt to reach a compromise with Luther, saying that the faithful made spiritual contact with God during the commemorative ceremony. (Note: Bullinger stated that "Believers ... bring Christ to the Supper in their hearts; they do not receive him in the Supper.")

=== Schleitheim Articles ===
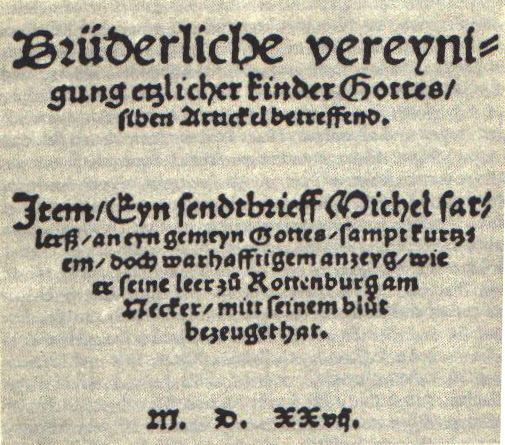
Title page of the Schleitheim Articles passed at the pacifist Anabaptists' assembly in 1527

The historian Carter Lindberg states that the "Peasants' War was a formative experience for many leaders of Anabaptism". Hans Hut (d. 1527) continued Müntzer's apocalypticism but others rejected all forms of violence.

The pacifist Michael Sattler (d. 1527) took the chair at an Anabaptist assembly at Schleitheim in February 1527. Here the participants adopted an anti-militarist program now known as the Schleitheim Articles. The document ordered the believers' separation from the evil world, and prohibited oath-taking, bearing of arms and holding of civic offices. Facing Ottoman expansionism, the Austrian authorities considered this pacifism as a direct threat to their country's defense. Sattler was quickly captured and executed. During his trial, he stated that "If the Turks should come, we ought not to resist them. For it is written: Thou shalt not kill."

Total segregation was alien to Hübmaier who tried to achieve a peaceful coexistence with non-Anabaptists. Expelled from Zürich, he settled in the Moravian domains of Count Leonhard von Liechtenstein at Nikolsburg (now Mikulov, Czech Republic). He baptised infants on the parents' request for which hard-line Anabaptists regarded him as an evil compromiser. He was sentenced to death and burned at the stake for heresy on Ferdinand I's orders. His execution inaugurated a period of intensive purge against rebaptisers. His followers relocated to Austerlitz (now Slavkov u Brna, Czech Republic) where refugees from Tyrol joined them. After the Tyrolian Jakob Hutter (d. 1536) assumed the leadership of the community, they began to held their goods in common. The Bohemian Brethren symphatised with the Hutterites which facilitated their survival in Moravia.

=== Confessions ===
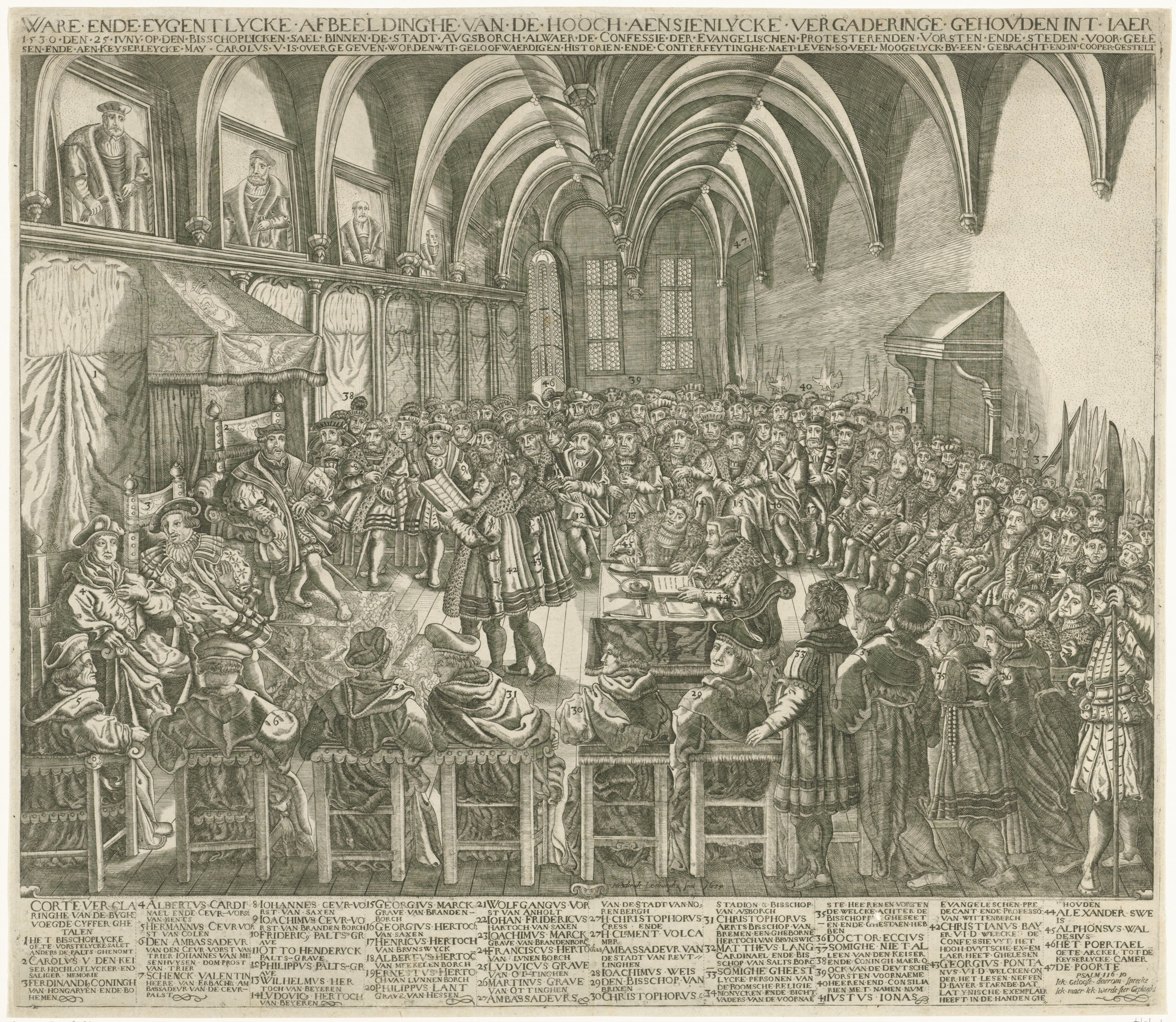
Charles V, Holy Roman Emperor receives the Augsburg Confession, 1530

Back in Germany in January 1530, Charles V asked the Protestants to summarize their theology at the following Diet in Augsburg. As the imperial ban prevented Luther from attending the Diet, Melanchthon completed the task. Melanchthon sharply condemned Anabaptist ideas and adopted a reconciliatory tone towards Catholicism but did not fail to emphasize the most featuring elements of Evangelical theology, such as justification by faith alone. The twenty-eight articles of the Augsburg Confession were presented at the Diet on 25 June. Four south German Protestant cities—Strasbourg, Constance, Lindau, and Memmingen—adopted a separate confessional document, the Tetrapolitan Confession because they were influenced by Zwingli's Eucharistic theology. On Charles's request, Eck and other Catholic theologians completed a response to the Augsburg Confession, called Confutatio ('refutation'). Charles ordered the Evangelical theologians to admit that their argumentation had been completely refuted. Instead, Melanchthon wrote a detailed explanation for the Evangelical articles of faith, known as the Apology of the Augsburg Confession.

Charles wanted to attack the Protestant princes and cities but the Catholic princes did not support him fearing that his victory would strengthen his power. The Diet passed a law prohibiting further religious innovations and ordering the Protestants to return to Catholicism until 15 April 1531. Luther had previously questioned the princes' right to resist imperial power, but by then he had concluded that a defensive war for religious purposes could be regarded as a just war. The Schmalkaldic League—the Protestant Imperial Estates' defensive alliance—was signed by five princes and fourteen cities on 27 February 1531. (Note: Electoral Saxony, Hesse, Brunswick-Lüneburg, Anhalt-Köthen, Mansfeld, Strasbourg, Ulm, Constance, Reutlingen, Memmingen, Lindau, Biberach an der Riß, Isny im Allgäu, Lübeck, Magdeburg, and Bremen were the founding members of the Schmalkaldic League.) As a new Ottoman invasion prevented the Habsburgs from waging war against the Protestants, a peace treaty was signed at Nuremberg in July 1532.

=== Royal Reformation in Scandinavia ===
The relationship between the papacy and the Scandinavian kingdoms was tense, as both Frederick I of Denmark and Norway, and Gustav I of Sweden appointed their own candidates to vacant episcopal sees. In 1526, the Danish Parliament prohibited the bishops to seek confirmation from the Holy See, and declared all fees payable for their confirmation as royal revenue. The former Hospitaller knight Hans Tausen (d. 1561) delivered Evangelical sermons in Viborg under royal protection from 1526. Four years later, the Parliament rejected the Catholic prelates' demand to condemn Evangelical preaching. After Frederick's death the bishops and conservative aristocrats prevented the election of his openly Protestant son Christian as his successor. Christopher, Count of Oldenburg (r. 1526–1566) took up arms on the deposed Christian II's behalf, but the war known as Count's Feud ended with the victory of Frederick's son who ordered the arrest of the Catholic bishops. Christian III (r. 1534–1559) was crowned king by Bugenhagen. Bugenhagen also ordained seven superintendents to lead the Church of Denmark. Christian declared the Augsburg Confession as the authoritative articles of faith in 1538, but pilgrimages to the most popular shrines continued, and the Eucharistic liturgy kept Catholic elements, such as kneeling.

In the Danish dependencies of Norway and Iceland, the Reformation required vigorous governmental interventions. The last Catholic Archbishop of Nidaros in Norway Olav Engelbrektsson (d. 1538) was a staunch opponent of the changes, but was succeeded by the Evangelical Gjeble Pederssøn (d. 1557) as superintendent. In Iceland, Jón Arason, Bishop of Hólar (d. 1550)—the last Nordic Catholic bishop—took up arms to prevent the Reformation, but he was captured and executed by representatives of royal authority. (Note: Bishop Jón was arrested along with two of his sons by a royalist wealthy peasant Daði Guðmundsson (d. 1563). Their guards executed them because they feared that Catholic Icelanders would come to their bishop's rescue.)

Gustav I of Sweden appointed the Evangelical preacher Laurentius Andreae (d. 1552) as his chancellor, and the Evangelical scholar Olaus Petri (d. 1552) as a minister at Stockholm. Petri translated the Gospels to Swedish. On his advice, Gustav dissolved a Catholic printing house that published popular anti-Protestant literature under the auspices of Hans Brask (d. 1538), Bishop of Linköping. Gustav also expelled the radical German pastor Melchior Hoffman (d. c. 1543) from Sweden for iconoclastic propaganda. The royal treasury needed extra funds to repay the loans borrowed from the Hanseatic League to finance the war against Christian II. Gustav persuaded the legislative assembly to secularise church property by threatening the delegates with his abdication. The peasantry remained very cautious about changes in church life. This together with heavy taxation led to uprisings. To appease the rebels, Gustav declared that he had not sanctioned the changes, and dismissed Andreae in 1531, Petri in 1533. He continued the transformation of church life in Sweden and Finland after the Reformation was fully introduced in Denmark. He was assisted by two Evangelical theologians Georg Norman (d. 1552/1553) and Mikael Agricola (d. 1557). In 1539, Norman was appointed as supertindent of the Church of Sweden, and Gustav took the title of "Supreme Defender of the Church".

== Catholic reform ==
=== Beginnings ===
The religious upheaval in Germany and the sack of Rome (1527) further convinced many Catholics that the church was in need of a profound reform. Pope Paul III (r. 1534–1549) appointed prominent representatives of the Catholic reform movement as cardinals, among them Contarini, Reginald Pole (d. 1558), and Giovanni Pietro Caraffa (d. 1559). They completed a report condemning the corruption of church administration and the waste of church revenues. (Note: Among others, the report suggested the dissolution of most monastic orders, allowing only the strictest orders to survive.) Contarini, Pole and other Spirituali were ready to make concessions to the Protestants but their liberalism shocked Caraffa and other conservative prelates.

Negotiations between moderate Catholic and Protestant theologians were not unusual. In 1541, Bucer and the Catholic theologian Johann Gropper (d. 1559) drafted a compromise formula on justification. (Note: The compromise included the statement that "the sinner is justified by a living and effectual faith".) The draft was discussed along with other issues at a colloquy during the Diet of Regensburg but no compromise was reached, not least due to opposition by both Luther and the Holy See. Contarini, who represented the papacy at the Diet, died in 1541; many Spirituali such as Vermigli fled from Italy to avoid persecution. Hermann of Wied, Archbishop-elector of Cologne (r. 1515–1546) completed a reform program with Bucer's assistance, criticising prayers to the saints and traditional Eucharistic theology, and proposing sermons about justification by faith. The canons of the Cologne Cathedral requested Gropper to write a critical response to it, and achieved Hermann's deposal by the Roman Curia.

=== New Orders ===
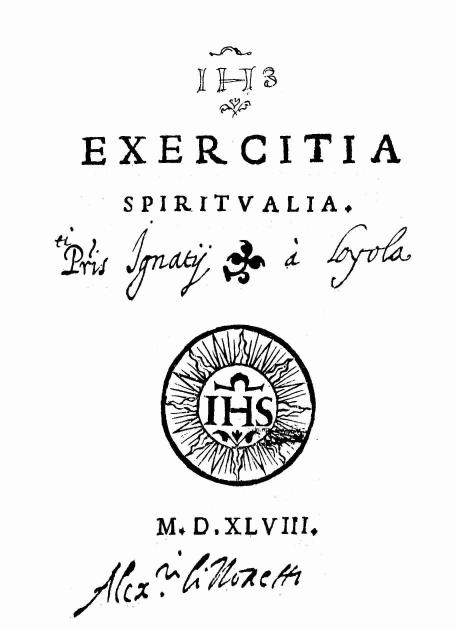
Title page of the first edition of the Spiritual Exercises by Ignatius of Loyola, published in 1548

The spread of new monastic orders was an important element of the Catholic reform movement. Most new orders placed great value on pastoral care. (Note: The Theatines offered pastoral care for the needy and the sick, especially for those who suffered from syphilis, the Capuchins were itinerant friars also preaching to the poor and the sick.) Among them, the Society of Jesus (or Jesuits) became the most influential. Its founder Ignatius of Loyola (d. 1556) was born to a Basque noble family. He chose a military career but abandoned it after being wounded during a siege. He started to write a devotional guide, the Spiritual Exercises, during his ascetic retreat at a cave. His mysticism aroused the Spanish Inquisition's suspicion but the Spirituali supported him. Paul III sanctioned the establishment of the Jesuits on Contarini's influence in 1540. The new order quickly developed: when Loyola died, the Society had about 1,000 members; in less than a decade, it numbered around 3,500. The maintenance of a well organised schooling system was the Jesuits' most prominent feature. Their Roman collegium prepared future priests to discuss and reject Protestant theologies primarily in Germany, Bohemia, Poland, and Hungary.

=== Council of Trent ===
Paul III decided to convoke the nineteenth ecumenical council to handle the crisis caused by the Reformation. The Council of Trent met in a series of sessions from December 1545 to 1548, 1551 to 1552, and 1562 to 1563. (Note: "It ran in two tracks: alongside the reformulation of Catholic doctrine in contrast to Protestant teaching stood the many general…reform decrees which would influence the life of Catholicism for centuries to come.Campi, Emidio (19 June 2013). "Was the Reformation a German Event?". The Myth of the Reformation: 9–31. doi:10.13109/9783666550331.9. ISBN 978-3-525-55033-5.) The topics dealt with included the Creed, the Sacraments including transubstantiation and ordination, justification, and improvement in the quality of priests by diocesan seminaries and annual canonical visitations. The council reaffirmed that apostolic tradition was as authentic a source of faith as the Bible, and emphasized the importance of good works in salvation, (Note: Sixth Session, Canon I "If any one saith, that man may be justified before God by his own works, whether done through the teaching of human nature, or that of the law, without the grace of God through Jesus Christ; let him be anathema." Canon XI "If any one saith, that men are justified, either by the sole imputation of the justice of Christ, or by the sole remission of sins, to the exclusion of the grace and the charity which is poured forth in their hearts by the Holy Ghost, and is inherent in them; or even that the grace, whereby we are justified, is only the favour of God; let him be anathema." Canon XXIV "If any one saith, that the justice received is not preserved and also increased before God through good works; but that the said works are merely the fruits and signs of Justification obtained, but not a cause of the increase thereof; let him be anathema.") rejecting two important elements of Luther's theology. Before being closed in December 1563, the Council mandated the papacy to revise liturgical books and complete a new catechism. Carlo Borromeo, Archbishop of Milan (d. 1582) adopted a more practical approach. He completed a handbook covering everyday details of church life, including the delivery of sermons, arrangement of church interiors, and hearing confessions. After the council, papal authority was reinforced through the establishment of central offices known as congregations. One of them became responsible for the list of forbidden literature. All church officials and university teachers were required to take a Tridentine confessional oath that included an oath of "true obedience" to the papacy.

Lindberg suggests that (following Trent) the "spirituality of Catholic reform was the ascetic, subjective, and personal piety", as expressed in public processions, the "perpetual" adoration of the Eucharist, and the reaffirmed veneration of Mary the Virgin and the saints.

== New waves ==
=== English reformation under Henry VIII ===
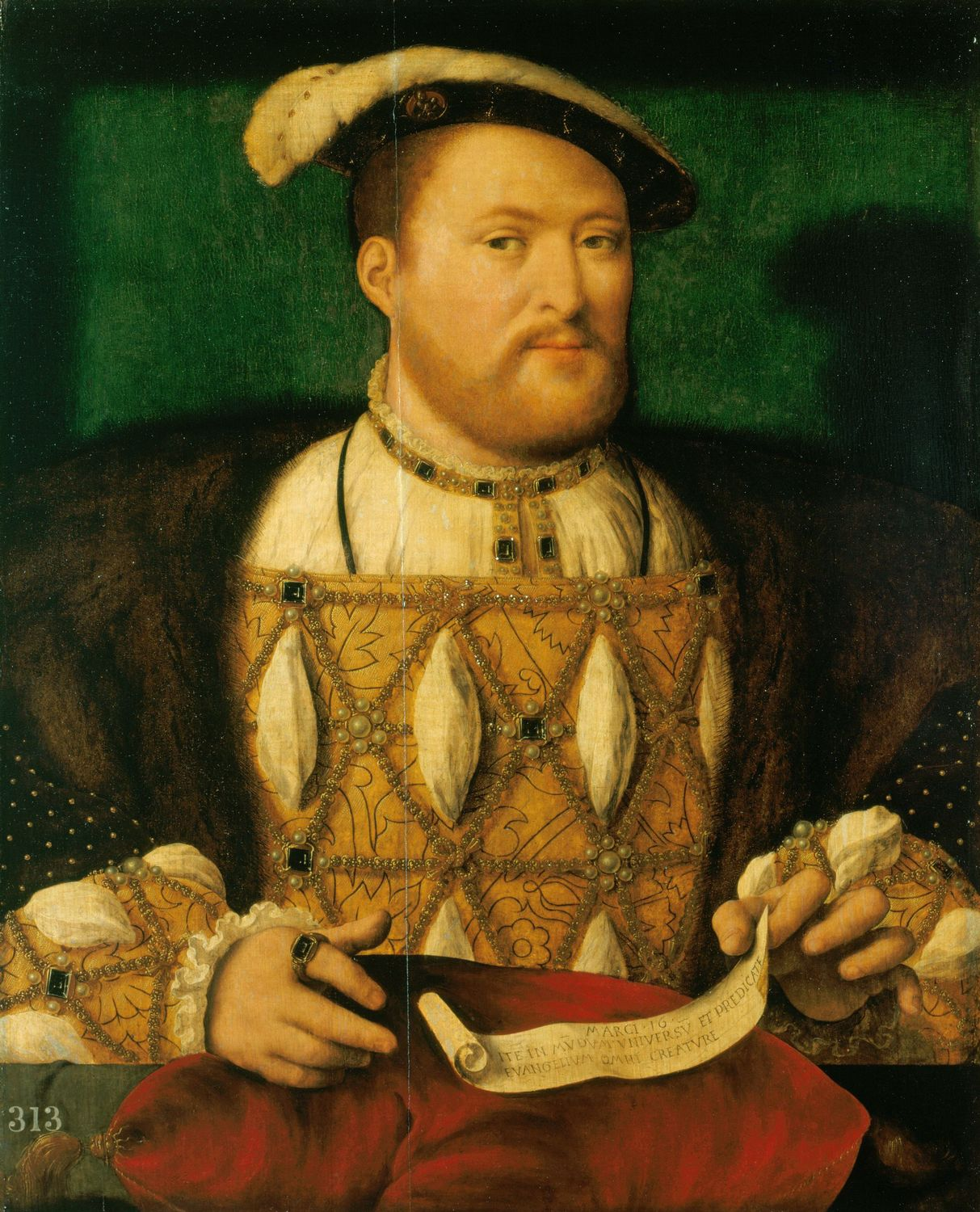
Portrait of King Henry VIII (early 1530s) by Joos van Cleve

In England, reformist clerics such as Thomas Bilney (d. 1531) and Robert Barnes (d. 1540) spread Luther's theology among Cambridge and Oxford scholars and students. The young priest William Tyndale (d. 1536) translated the New Testament to English using Erasmus's Latin-Greek edition. By around 1535, more than 15,000 copies of his translation had been distributed in secret. Tyndale's biographer David Daniell (d. 2016) writes that the translation "gave the English language a plain prose style of the very greatest importance", and his "influence has been greater than any other writer in English".

The Lord Chancellor Cardinal Thomas Wolsey (d. 1530) had strong links to the Roman Curia, but he was unable to achieve the annulment of the marriage of Henry VIII and the middle-aged Catherine of Aragon (d. 1536). (Note: Charles V was Catherine's nephew, and after the sack of Rome by imperial troops Pope Clement VII did not dare to offend Charles by annulling the marriage of his aunt.) They had needed a papal dispensation to marry because Catherine was the widow of Henry's brother Arthur, Prince of Wales (d. 1502). As she had not produced a male heir, Henry became convinced that their incestuous marriage drew the wrath of God.

Henry charged a group of scholars including Thomas Cranmer (d. 1556) with collecting arguments in favour of the annulment. They concluded that the English kings had always had authority over the clergy, and the Book of Leviticus forbade marriage between a man and his brother's widow in all circumstances. In 1530, the Parliament limited the jurisdiction of church courts. Wolsey had meanwhile lost Henry's favour and died, but More tried to convince Henry to abandon his plan about the annulment of his marriage. In contrast, Cranmer and Henry's new chief advisor Thomas Cromwell (d. 1540) argued that the marriage could be annulled without papal interference. Henry who had fallen in love with Catherine's lady-in-waiting Anne Boleyn (d. 1536) decided to marry her even if the marriage could lead to a total break with the papacy. During a visit in Germany, Cranmer married but kept his marriage in secret. On his return to England, Henry appointed him as the new Archbishop of Canterbury, and the Holy See confirmed the appointment.

The links between the English Church and the papacy were severed by Acts of Parliament. (Note: Henry's lawyers took inspiration from the Defensor pacis ('The Defender of Peace'), a legal treatise by Marsiglio of Padua (d. c. 1342) who argued that the Church was subordinated to the state.) In April 1533, the Act of Appeals decreed that only English courts had jurisdiction in cases of last wills, marriages and grants to the church, emphasizing that "this realm of England is an Empire". A special church court annulled the marriage of Henry and Catherine, and declared their only daughter Mary (d. 1558) illegitimate in May 1533. Pope Clement VII did not sanction the judgement and excommunicated Henry. Ignoring the papal ban, Henry married Anne, and she gave birth to a daughter Elizabeth (d. 1603). Anne was a staunch supporter of the Reformation, and mainly her nominees were appointed to the vacant bishoprics between 1532 and 1536. In 1534, the Act of Supremacy declared the king the "only supreme head of the Church of England". Many of those who refused to swear a special oath of loyalty to the king—65 from about 400 defendants—were executed. More and John Fisher, Bishop of Rochester (d. 1535) were among the most prominent victims. Cromwell gradually convinced Henry that a "purification" of church life was needed. The number of feast days was reduced by about 75 per cent, pilgrimages were forbidden, all monasteries were dissolved and their property was seized by the Crown.

The Parliament of Ireland passed similar acts but they could only be fully implemented in the lands under direct English rule. Resistance against the Reformation was vigorous. In 1534, the powerful Lord Thomas FitzGerald (d. 1537) staged a revolt. Although it was crushed, thereafter Henry's government did not introduce drastic changes in the Church of Ireland. In England, the dissolution of monasteries caused a popular revolt known as the Pilgrimage of Grace. The "pilgrims" demanded the dismissal of "heretic" royal advisors but they were overcame by royalist forces. The principal articles of faith of the Church of England were summarized in the Six Articles in 1539. It reaffirmed several elements of traditional theology, such as transubstantiation and clerical celibacy.

As Anne Boleyn did not give birth to a son, she lost Henry's favour. She was executed for adultery, and Elizabeth was declared a bastard. Henry's only son Edward (d. 1553) was born to Henry's third wife Jane Seymour (d. 1537). In 1543, an Act of Parliament returned Mary and Elizabeth to the line of the succession behind Edward. Henry attacked Scotland to enforce the marriage of Edward and the infant Mary, Queen of Scots (r. 1542–1567) but her mother Mary of Guise (d. 1560) reinforced Scotland's traditional alliance with France. The priest George Wishart (d. 1546) was the first to preach Zwinglian theology in Scotland. After he was burned for heresy, his followers, among them John Knox (d. 1572), assassinated Cardinal David Beaton, Archbishop of St Andrews (d. 1546), but French troops crushed their revolt.

=== Münster ===
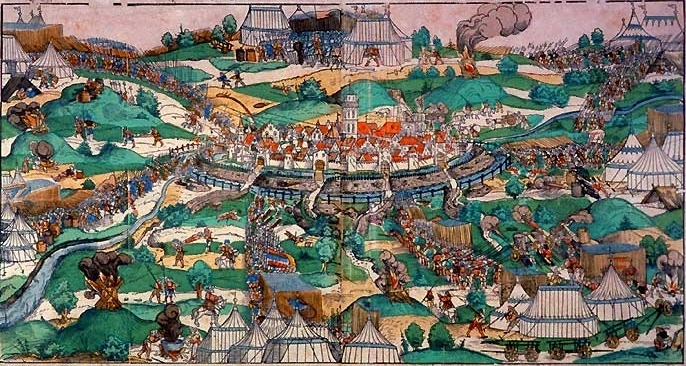
Münster besieged by Prince-bishop Franz von Waldeck

Having been banished from Sweden, Hoffman was wandering in southern Germany and the Low Countries. He turned Anabaptist but suspended adult baptism to avoid persecution. He denied that Christ had become flesh, (Note: The lay preacher Clement Ziegler was the first to proclaim (in 1524) that Christ had had a celestial body before Mary gave birth to him. Hoffman went as far as comparing Mary with a bag, likely unaware that he adopted a metaphor from the Gnostic theologian Valentinus (d. c. 180). According to Valentinus, Christ passed through Mary "as water through a pipe".) and preached that 144,000 elect were to gather in Strasbourg to witness Christ's return in 1533. His followers known as Melchiorites swarmed into the city, presenting an enormous challenge for its charity provisions. Hoffman also came to Strasbourg, but the authorities arrested him. After the deadline for Christ's return passed uneventfully, many disappointed Melchiorites accepted the leadership of a charismatic Dutch baker Jan Matthijszoon (d. 1534). He blamed Hoffman for the suspension of adult baptism, and proclaimed the city of Münster as the New Jerusalem. Although Münster was an episcopal see, the town council had installed a Protestant pastor Bernhard Rothmann (d. c. 1535) in clear defiance to the new prince-bishop Franz von Waldeck (r. 1532–1553). Those who expected a radical social transformation from the Reformation flocked to Münster. The radicals assumed full control of the town in February 1534.

Bishop Franz and his allies, among them Philip of Hessen, attacked Münster but could not capture it. Under Matthijszoon's rule, private property and the use of money was outlawed in the town. Believing that God would protect him, Matthijszoon made a sortie against the enemy, but he was killed. Another charismatic Dutchman, John of Leiden (d. 1536)—a former tailor—succeeded him. Leiden announced that he was receiving revelations from God, and proclaimed himself "king of righteousness" and "the ruler of the new Zion". Church and state were united, and all sinners were executed. Leiden legalized polygyny, and ordered all women who were twelve or older to marry. The protracted siege demoralized the defenders, and Münster fell through treason on 25 June 1535. After the fall of Münster, most Anabaptist groups adopted a pacifist approach under the leadership of a former priest Menno Simons (d. 1561). He associated the Anabaptist communities with the New Jerusalem. His followers would be known as Mennonites. Nearly all Anabaptist communities were destroyed in Germany, Austria, and Switzerland, but moderate Anabaptist groups survived in East Frisia, and were mainly tolerated in England.

=== Calvin and the Institutes of the Christian Religion ===
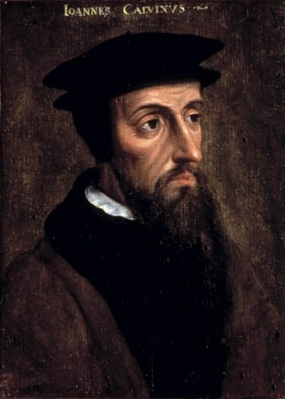
Portrait of John Calvin (c. 1550) by an unknown French painter

The future reformer John Calvin (d. 1564) was destined to a church career by his father, a lay administrator of the Bishopric of Noyon in France. (Note: Calvin was only twelve when received a benefice at the Noyon Cathedral.) He studied theology at the Sorbonne, and law at Orléans and Bourges. He read treatises by Lefèvre and Lefèvre's disciples at the newly established Collège Royal, and abandoned Catholicism under the influence of his Protestant friends, particularly the physician Nicolas Cop (d. 1540). The persecution of French Protestants intensified after the so-called Affair of the Placards. In October 1534, placards (or posters) attacking the Mass were placed at many places, including the door to the royal bedchamber in Château d'Amboise. In retaliation, twenty-four Protestants were executed, and many intellectuals had to leave France.

Calvin was one of the French religious refugees. He settled in Basel and completed the first version of his principal theological treatise, the Institutes of the Christian Religion in 1536. He would be rewriting and expanding it several times until 1559. As the historian Carlos Eire writes, "Calvin's text was blessed with a lawyer's penchant for precision, a humanist's love for poetic expression and rhetorical flourishes, and a theologian's respect for paradox". With Eire's words, Calvin "revived the jealous God of the Old Testament". He warned French King Francis I that the persecution of the faithful would incur the wrath of God upon him but sharply distanced moderate Protestants from Anabaptists. (Note: In the preface to the Institutes, addressed to Francis I, Calvin described the co-followers of his doctrine as examples of "chastity, generousity, mercy, continence, patience, modesty, and all other virtues", whose enemies are priests, and contrasting them with the Anabaptists who in his view "only wished to govern themselves in accordance with their foolish brains, under the pretence of wishing to obey God") Already the first edition of the Institutes contained references to two distinguishing elements of Calvin's theology, both traceable back to Augustine: his conviction that the original sin had completely corrupted human nature, and his strong belief in "double predestination". In his view, only strict social and ecclesiastic control could prevent sins and crimes, and God did not only decide who were saved but also those who were destined to damnation.

In 1536, Farel convinced Calvin to settle in Geneva. Their attempts to implement radical reforms in discipline brought them into conflicts with those who feared that the new measures would lead to clerical despotism. After they refused to acknowledge the urban magistrates' claim to intervene in the process of excommunication, they were banished from the town. Calvin moved to Strasbourg where Bucer made a profound impact on him. Under Bucer's influence, Calvin adopted an intermediate position on the Eucharist between Luther and Zwingli, denying Christ's presence in it but acknowledging that the rite included a real spiritual communion with Christ.

Calvin on the "double predestination"

No one who wishes to be thought religious dares simply deny predestination, by which God adopts some to hope of life, and sentences others to eternal death...For all are not created in an equal condition; rather eternal life is fore-ordained for some, eternal damnation for others.

— John Calvin, Institutes of the Christian Religion (1559)

After Calvin and Farel left Geneva, no pastors were able to assume the leadership of the local Protestant community. Fearing of a Catholic restoration, the urban magistrates convinced Calvin to come back to Geneva in 1541. Months after his return, the town council enacted The Ecclesiastical Ordinances, a detailed regulation summarizing Calvin's proposals for church administration. The Ordinances established four church offices. The pastors were responsible for pastoral care and discipline; the doctors instructed believers in the faith; the elders (or presbyters) were authorized to "watch over the life of each person" and to report those who lived a "disorderly" life to the pastors; and deacons were appointed to administer the town's charity. All townspeople were obliged to regularly attend church services. Calvin established a special court called the consistory to hear cases of moral lapse such as blasphemy, adultery, disrespect to authorities, gossiping, witchcraft and participation in rites considered superstitious by church authorities. The consistory was composed of the pastors, the elders, and an urban magistrate, and the townspeople were encouraged to report sinful acts to it. First-time offenders mainly received lenient sentences such as fines, but repeat offenders were banished from the town or executed. Resistance against the Ordinances was significant. Many continued visit shrines and pray to saints, while many patricians insisted on liberal traditional customs for which Calvin called them "Libertines".

=== Reformation in Britain ===
Henry VIII died on 27 January 1547. His nine-year-old son Edward VI (r. 1547–1553) succeeded him, and Edward's maternal uncle Edward Seymour, 1st Duke of Somerset (d. 1552) assumed power as Lord Protector. Somerset halted the persecution of religious dissidents, making England a safe haven for religious refugees from all over Europe. They established their own congregations, served by prominent pastors, such as the Polish Jan Łaski (d. 1560) and the Spanish Casiodoro de Reina (d. 1594). Most of them adhered to Reformed theology. Cranmer introduced further religious reforms: images were removed from the churches, the doctrine of purgatory was rejected, and all endowments for prayers for the dead (or chantries) were confiscated. With the introduction of Cranmer's Book of Common Prayer, the Mass was replaced by a vernacular liturgy. (Note: The new Anglican liturgy was heavily influenced by Evangelical church services, and Archbishop Hermann of Cologne's liturgical proposals.)

Marshall notes, that it is "safe to say that the greater part of the population disliked what was taking place". The liturgical changes caused popular revolts in Devon and Cornwall and other places but they were quickly suppressed, just like the riot against the dissolution of chantries in East Yorkshire. Even in Norfolk, where the peasants adopted a Protestant rhetoric, they assembled under the banners of their parish saints. Somerset's opponents took advantage of the unrest to get rid of him. He was replaced by John Dudley (d. 1553) who was made Duke of Northumberland. Cranmer continued the liturgical reforms, and the new version of the Book of Common Prayer rejected the dogma of transubstantiation. He completed the Forty-two Articles, a new confessional document combining elements of Reformed and Evangelical theologies.

Edward died of tuberculosis on 6 July 1553. He had designated his Protestant relative Jane Grey (d. 1554) as his heir to prevent the succession of his Catholic sister Mary, but most English remained loyal to the Tudor dynasty. Initially, Mary I (r. 1553–1558) took advantage of her royal prerogatives to dismiss married clergy, appoint Catholic priests to bishoprics, and restore the Mass. She had to make concessions to landowners who had seized church property to achieve the restoration of papal supremacy by the Parliament in November 1554. Cranmer was forced to sign six documents condemning his own acts but withdrew his recantations while being burned for heresy in public in March 1556. Reginald Pole was appointed as the new archbishop of Canterbury, but he was accused of heresy after his old enemy Carafa had been elected pope as Paul IV (r. 1555–1559). The restoration of the altars and images gained popular support in many places, but recatholisation faced significant resistance—around 300 Protestants were burned, and about 1,000 were forced into exile during Mary's reign. Her marriage with Philip II of Spain was unpopular, and she died childless on 17 November 1558.

Mary's sister and successor Elizabeth I (r. 1558–1603) sought a via media ('middle way') between religious extremists. Her first Parliament restored the royal leadership of the Church of England, and introduced a modified version of the Book of Common Prayer. The Anglican liturgy retained elements of Catholic ceremonies, such as priestly vestments, and contained ambiguous sentences about the Eucharist, suggesting the real presence of Jesus's Blood and Body for conservatives, and a memorial service for reformers. Elizabeth supervised the revision of the Anglican articles of faith in person. The subsequent Thirty-nine Articles were formulated in a way that adherents to the major mainstream Protestant theologies could accept them. However, the most resolute Protestants were determined to purify the Church of England from the remnants of Catholic ceremonies, hence they were called Puritans. They were especially influential at the universities. Many of them rejected the authority of bishops, the Presbyterians emphasized the equal status of all priests, whereas the Congregationalists wanted to strengthen the position of local communities in church administration.

England's recatholisation contributed to the triumph of Reformation in Scotland. James Hamilton, 2nd Earl of Arran (d. 1575), heir presumptive to Queen Mary of the Scots, assumed the leadership of the Protestant lords. Incited by Knox's passionate sermons, anti-Catholic sentiments led to a popular revolt of elementary force in 1559, causing the destruction of monasteries and friaries.

=== Servetus and the Restoration of Christianity ===
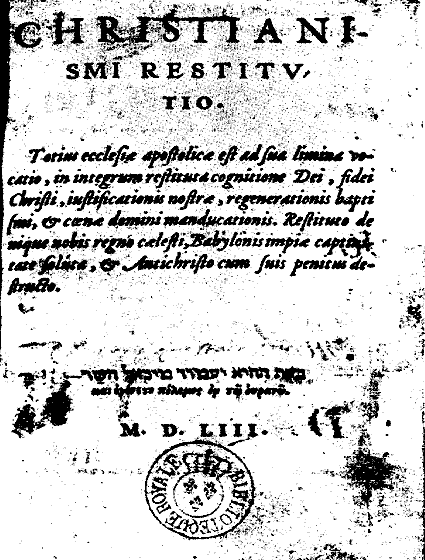
Title page of the Restoration of Christianity (1553) by Michael Servetus

The first radicals who rejected the dogma of Trinity were put on trial in Augsburg in 1527. A scholar from Navarre Michael Servetus (d. 1553) adopted antitrinitarian theology in the 1530s. MacCulloch proposes that Servetus rejected the Trinity, a dogma extremely offensive to Jews and Muslims, because he wanted to present Christianity as a universal religion. After studying medicine and anatomy in Paris, (Note: Servetus was one of the first to discover the pulmonary circulation.) Servetus became the court physician of the elderly Catholic archbishop of Vienne in southern France. While in Vienne, he sent the first (unpublished) versions of his theological work, the Restoration of Christianity to Calvin. He disrespectfully described the Trinity as a three-headed Cerberus, attacked infant baptism, and denied original sin. He also wrote insulting comments on Calvin's Institutes. The Restoration was published anonymously in Lyon in 1553, but the Catholic Inquisition identified Servetus as its author by using documents from Calvin's personal files. Servetus fled from France but attended a church service delivered by Calvin in Geneva. He was recognised and arrested, and the urban authorities sentenced him to death with Calvin's consent. He was burned at the stake on 27 October 1553.

Bucer, Melanchthon and other leading Protestant theologians agreed with Servetus's execution. Only the Basel-based schoolmaster and Bible translator Sebastian Castellio (d. 1563) condemned it in a manifesto for religious toleration. He also addressed a letter to Calvin, echoing his posthumous benefactor Erasmus, stating "To burn a heretic is not to defend a doctrine, but to kill a man". Erasmus was a Trinitarian himself, but had noted that the theological formulation had developed from the time of the Apostles, which fueled many subsequent antitrinitarians who took this to mean it that the idea was unbiblical. (Note: Erasmus' ideas also were re-expressed in Basel by exiled Italian reformer Cælio Secondo Curione who in 1554 produced a book on God's mercy Coelii secundi curionis de amplitudine beati regni dei. Curiusly, this book was re-write of a re-re-translation of Erasmus' 1524 De immensa Dei misericordia which presented an alternative to the Lutheran/Calvinistic emphasis on pre-destination: God was not arbitrary but merciful.)

Antitrinitarian theology survived among Italian exiles in Basel. Lelio Sozzini (d. 1562), a scholar from Siena, argued that Biblical texts calling Jesus "Son of God" did not refer to his divinity but to his faultless humanity. His nephew, Fausto Sozzini (d. 1604) rejected original sin and the theory of satisfaction (the concept that Christ's sufferings brought about atonement to God the Father for the original sin). Their followers became known as Socinians.

After Servetus's execution Calvin strengthened his position as the leading figure of Reformed Protestantism. In Geneva, the Libertines rose up but they were quickly overcome, and forced into exile or executed. The confiscation of the property of the wealthy Ami Perrin (d. 1561) and his family provided the city with funds to create an academy. It served both as a preparatory school for local youths and as a seminary for Reformed ministers. Calvin's chief assistant Theodore Beza (d. 1605) was appointed as its first rector. The academy quickly developed into a principal center of theological training for students from all over Europe, earning Geneva the nickname "the Protestant Rome". It was especially popular among French Protestants.

== Wars of religion and tolerance ==
=== Schmalkaldic Wars ===
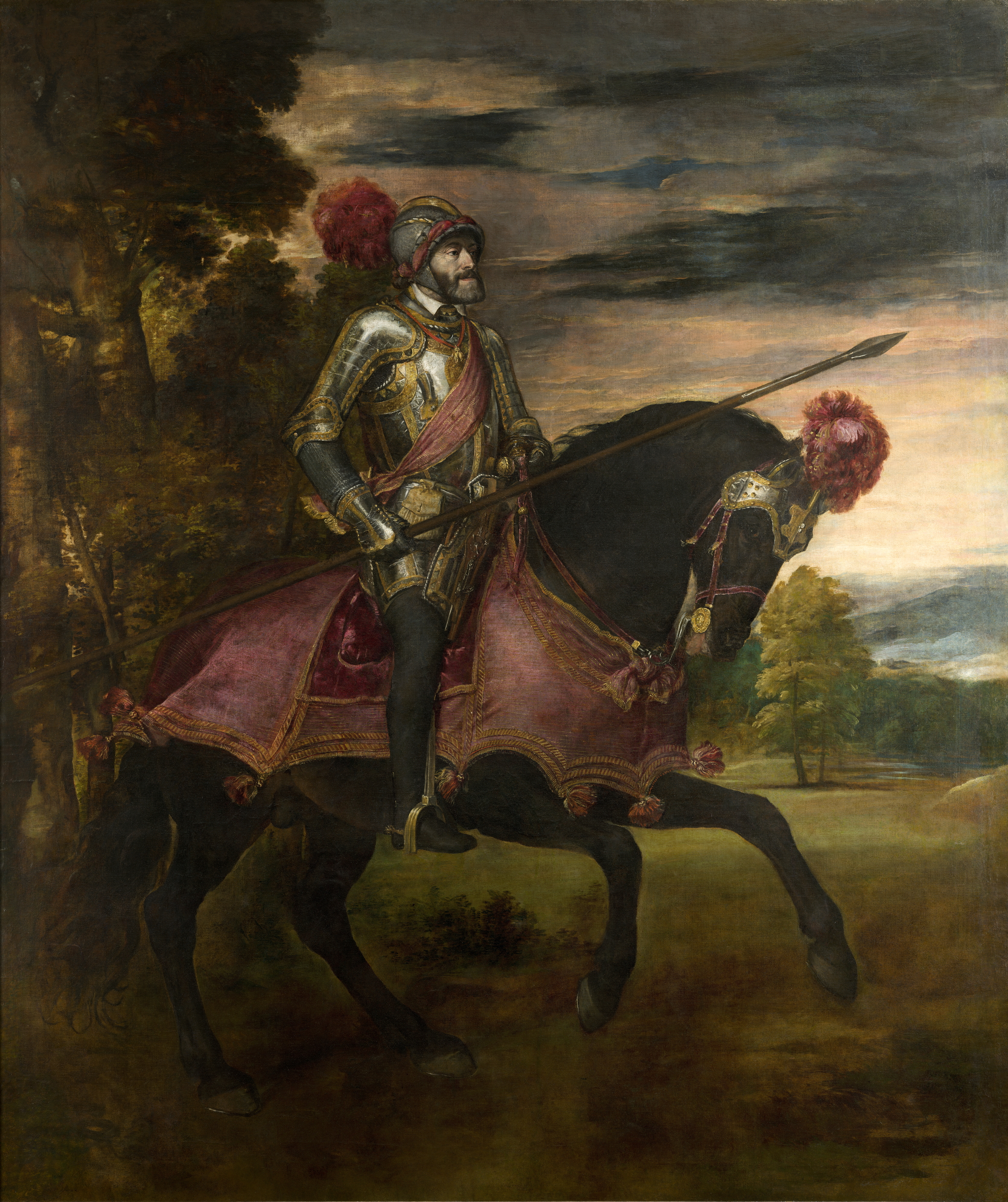
Portrait of Emperor Charles V at the 1547 Battle of Mühlberg (1548) by Titian

Scandals and internal conflicts weakened the Protestants' position in Germany in the early 1540s. Philip the Magnanimous committed bigamy by secretly marrying a lady-in-waiting of his court although his wife was still alive. Bucer, Luther, and Melanchthon had discretely sanctioned the bigamious marriage allegedly to prevent adultery. In 1542, Philip and John the Constant's successor, John Frederick I (r. 1532–1547) invaded the Duchy of Braunschweig-Wolfenbüttel which brought disapproval from other princes. Disputes over lands renewed the old rivalry between the Ernestine and Albertine branches of the Wettin dynasty of Saxony. Taking advantage of the situation, Emperor Charles built a broad coalition of Catholic and Evangelical princes against Hesse and Electoral Saxony. The coalition included the Albertine duke Maurice of Saxony (r. 1541–1553). During the ensuing Schmalkaldic War, Charles and his allies won a decisive victory, and Maurice was rewarded with John Frederick's title of elector.

The triumphant Charles V regulated religious issues with an imperial edict known as the Augsburg Interim. The Interim sanctioned clerical marriage and the communion in both kinds in Protestant territories, but denied further concessions. Maurice issued an alternative regulation called the Leipzig Interim for Saxony which ordered the clergy to wear surplices. Melanchthon supported the Leipzig Interim, stating that such issues were "matters indifferent" but uncompromising Lutheran theologians such as Nicolaus von Amsdorf (d. 1565) and Matthias Flacius (d. 1575) rejected all concessions to imperial demands. Different views on justification and the Eucharist caused further heated debates between Melanchton's followers, known as Philippists, and their opponents, called Gnesio-Lutherans ('authentic Lutherans') in the 1550s. The Augsburg Interim was only implemented in the southern German Protestant cities. This led to the expulsion of recalcitrant clerics, including Bucer from Strasbourg. Alarmed by Charles's triumph, Calvin and Bullinger agreed on a consensual Eucharistic formula, now known as Consensus Tigurinus ('Consensus of Zürich'), emphasising that Christ "makes us participants of himself" in the Lord's Supper, but also stating that God "uses the ministry of the sacraments" without infusing divine power into them. Luther had died in 1546 but his followers rejected the Consensus. (Note: The Evangelical pastor Joachim Westphal (d. 1574) described Calvin as "the cow" and Bullinger as "the bull" in a pamphlet against the Consensus in 1552.) The rift between Evangelical and Reformed Protestants widened to the extent that Reformed refugees faced an unfriendly reception at Evangelical countries. In Bohemia, Hussite and Evangelical aristocrats and townspeople rose up against King Ferdinand I. Although Ferdinand crushed the revolt, he had to sanction religious plurality in Moravia as a reward for the Moravian Estates' loyalty during the Bohemian revolt.

Distrusting Emperor Charles, Maurice brokered a coalition of Evangelical princes, and promised four prince-bishoprics to King Henry II of France (r. 1547–1559) for financial support. Maurice and his allies invaded the Habsburgs' domains, forcing Charles to flee. Signed on 10 August 1552, the Peace of Passau prescribed that the religious issues were to be discussed at the following Imperial Diet. The Diet was opened at Augsburg on 5 February 1555. Already exhausted, Charles appointed Ferdinand to represent him. Ferdinand's negotiations with the Evangelical princes ended with the Peace of Augsburg on 25 September. The document reaffirmed the principle cuius regio, eius religio, but the Imperial Estates could only choose between Catholicism and the Augsburg Confession. Evangelical imperial free cities had to tolerate the existence of Catholic communities within their walls, and prince-bishoprics could not be secularised in case the bishop abandoned the Catholic faith. Charles, who did not sign the peace treaty, abdicated, ceding his imperial title to Ferdinand, and his vast empire to his son Philip II of Spain (r. 1556–1598).

=== French Wars of Religion ===
Many French Protestants did not risk to profess their faith in public. They were known as Nicodemites after Nicodemus, a Pharisee who visited Jesus in secret. Calvin condemned this practice describing those who attended the Mass as soldiers "in the army of Antichrist". Under his influence, the French Protestants started to stay away from Catholic church services. They were called Huguenots for uncertain reason. The poet Clément Marot (d. 1544) provided them with popular stirring songs by translating forty-nine Psalms to French. Francis I promised to exterminate heresy in France in a peace treaty with Charles V in 1544. Next year, Waldensians were massacred in the Luberon region. In 1547, Henry II established a special court for heresy cases, named la chambre ardente ('the burning chamber'). The lawyer Jean Crespin (d. 1572) completed a catalogue of martyrs to commemorate the victims of the purges, and it gained immense popularity in the Protestant communities all over Europe. After around 1555, prominent French aristocrats converted to Protestantism, including Marguerite of Angoulême's daughter, Jeanne d'Albret, (d. 1572), Jeanne's husband Antoine de Bourbon (d. 1562), and Gaspard II de Coligny (d. 1572), admiral of France. Their patronage encouraged less distinguished Huguenots to express their faith in public. In 1559, delegates from seventy-two congregations attended the first synod of the Reformed Church of France, representing about 1.5–2 million believers. The synod adopted the Gallican Confession, a confessional document drafted by Calvin.

Fully preoccupied with a new war against Emperor Charles, Henry II did not take severe measures against the Huguenot nobility. After his sudden death after an accident, his eldest son Francis II (r. 1559–1560) ascended the throne. His wife, Mary, Queen of Scots was the niece of Francis, Duke of Guise (d. 1563) and Charles, Cardinal of Lorraine (d. 1574), two leaders of the most resolute Catholic faction of the nobility. The queen mother Catherine de' Medici (d. 1589) distrusted them but the persecution of Huguenots intensified under their influence. When Francis died by an ear infection, Calvin considered his fate as divine deliverance. Francis was succeeded by his brother Charles IX (r. 1560–1574) under Catherine's regency. She enacted the Huguenots' right to freely attend church services and hold public assemblies because she wanted to avoid a civil war along religious lines.

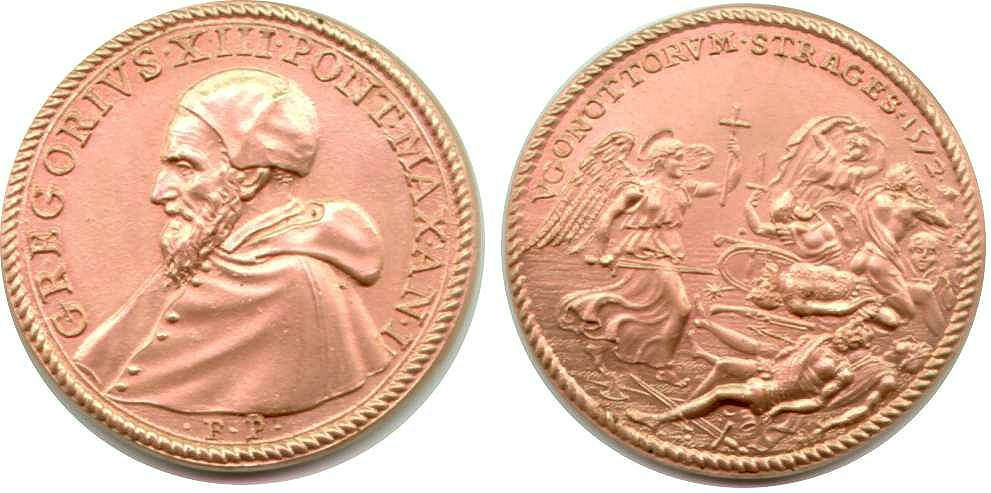
Pope Gregory XIII's medal commemorating the St. Bartholomew's Day massacre in Paris with the inscription "VGONOTTORVM STRAGES 1572" ('Massacre of Huguenots, 1572')

Uncompromising Catholics and Huguenots considered their confrontation inevitable. The first of the French Wars of Religion—a series of armed conflicts between Catholics and Huguenots—began after Guise's retainers massacred more than fifty Huguenots at Vassy on 1 March 1562. As Antoine de Bourbon had returned to Catholicism, his brother Louis I, Prince of Condé (d. 1569) assumed the leadership of a Huguenot revolt. They concluded a treaty with England in September 1562. To achieve a reconciliation, Catherine de'Medici married off her daughter Margaret of Valois (d. 1615) to the Protestant son of Jeanne d'Albret and Antoine de Bourbon, Henry de Bourbon, King of Navarre (r. 1572–1610). Mutual mistrust between Catholics and Huguenots, and the Parisians' determination to cleanse their city of heresy led to the St. Bartholomew's Day massacre after the wedding. On 24 August 1572, a fanatic mob slaughtered 2,000–3,000 Protestants in Paris, and by early October further 6,000–7,000 Huguenots fell victim to pogroms in other cities and towns. Many Huguenots returned to the Catholic Church or fled from France, and those who remained gathered in southern and southern-west France and continued the armed resistance. Known as "Malcontents", moderate Catholics concluded that only concessions to the Huguenots could restore peace.

Charles IX died in May 1574 leaving an almost empty treasury to his brother Henry III (r. 1574–1567). Henry adopted a moderate religious policy but the uncompromising Catholics established the Catholic League in 1576. They entered into a secret alliance with Philip II of Spain to prevent the spread of Protestantism. In 1589, the monk Jacques Clément mortally wounded King Henry. He named Henry de Bourbon as his heir, but the League and many cities refused to obey to a Huguenot king. Henry IV secured the support of moderate Catholics by converting to Catholicism. He defeated his French opponents and their Spanish allies, and put an end to the civil war early in 1598. He enacted many of the demands of the Huguenots, about fifteen per cent of the population, in the Edict of Nantes. Among others, they were allowed to attend religious services in many places, and their right to hold public offices was confirmed.

=== Revolt in the Netherlands ===
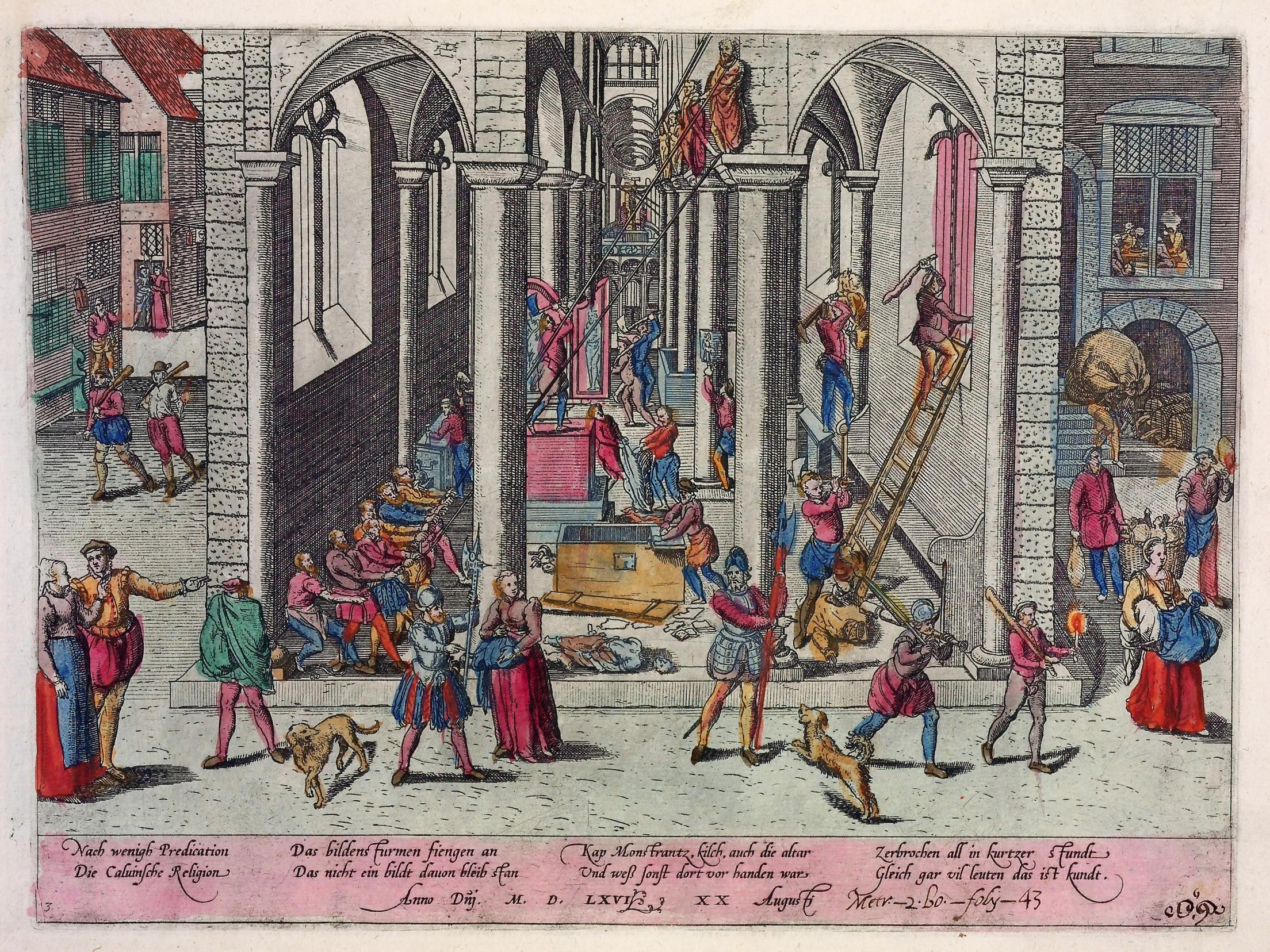
Engraving of the sack of the Church of Our Lady in Antwerp (1566) by Frans Hogenberg

More Protestants fell victim to persecution in the seventeen provinces of Habsburg Netherlands than in any other country between 1523 and 1555. (Note: Around 1,900 individuals were executed for heresy; about two-thirds of them were Anabaptists.) The ruthless persecution prevented the establishment of Evangelical congregations although Luther's ideas were widely discussed in Flemish communities. Reformed theology spread among the Walloons through individuals' correspondence with Calvin and the Genevan academy from the 1540s. Nicodemism was not unusual but uncompromising Protestants disturbed Catholic ceremonies. (Note: In Tournai, a Protestant man seized the sacramental bread during the mass, condemning "papist idolatry". An other man called a Catholic cleric a false prophet in Ghent.) The preacher Guido de Bres (d. 1567) established the first permanent Reformed congregations. He was a main contributor to the Belgic Confession, a confessional document based on the Gallican Confession, first published in Walloon in 1561, and in Dutch in 1562. The Confession sharply criticised the Anabaptists, and emphasized the importance of church discipline.

In 1566, 300 nobles requested Philip II's governor Margaret of Parma (d. 1586) to moderate anti-heretic legislation. Although the petitioners were mocked as "beggars", Margaret was open to a compromise. Protestant refugees returned from abroad, and religious enthusiasts stirred up public demonstrations. On the night of 20–21 August 1566, a Protestant mob sacked the Antwerp Cathedral, introducing a popular iconoclastic movement that spread all over the Netherlands. In 1567, Philip appointed Fernando Álvarez de Toledo, 3rd Duke of Alba (d. 1582) to crush the riots. Alba arrived at the head of a 20,000-strong army, and introduced a reign of terror, leading to the execution of thousands of people. A prominent aristocrat William the Silent, Prince of Orange (d. 1584) assumed the leadership of the resistance. His "Sea Beggars"—a squadron of privateers—seized the provinces of Holland and Zeeland by 1572, although the Reformed communities were in the minority in most towns. (Note: For instance, Protestants made up less than 3 per cent of the population in the town of Alkmaar in 1576.)

Philip II's government faced bankruptcy and his unpaid Spanish troops sacked Antwerp in 1576. This led to a general revolt against Spanish rule. The Catholic aristocrat Philippe III de Croÿ, Duke of Aarschot (d. 1595), made an alliance with William the Silent but rivalry between Catholics and Protestants did not abate. In 1581, the northern provinces united under William's leadership, and renounced allegiance to Philip. In the south, Margaret of Parma's son Alessandro Farnese crushed the revolts, forcing about 100,000 Protestants to seek refugee in the north. Developed from the union of seven northern provinces, the Dutch Republic remained under the loose leadership of the House of Orange. The Reformed pastors were eager to transform the whole society along their ideas. They failed because William preferred a more tolerant approach, and significant Protestant groups associated church discipline with Catholicism. As a consequence, Evangelical, Anabaptist and Catholic communities survived in the Dutch Republic. Heterodox theologies could also spread, such as the views of Jacobus Arminius (d. 1609) who argued that an individual could resist divine grace. Although Arminianism was rejected at the international Synod of Dort in 1619, it continued to influence Protestant theologians.

=== Edict of Torda ===
After King Louis's death at Mohács, two claimants John Zápolya (r. 1526–1540) and Ferdinand I of Habsburg (r. 1526–1564) competed for the Hungarian throne. They were Catholic but neither of them risked to alienate potential supporters by anti-Protestant purges. The Transylvanian Saxon leader Markus Pemfflinger (d. 1537) promoted Evangelical preaching in the Saxon metropolis Hermanstadt (Sibiu, Romania) from around 1530. Evangelical teaching spread among ethnic Hungarians, Slovaks, and Croats after Protestant aristocrats started to appoint Evangelical preachers to the churches under their patronage in the 1530s. After Zápolya's death, the Ottomans conquered central Hungary, his widow Isabella Jagiellon (d. 1559) assumed the regency for their infant son John Sigismund Zápolya (r. 1540–1571) in eastern Hungary under Ottoman suzerainty, and Ferdinand ruled Royal Hungary in the north and west. Often in need of funds, Ferdinand seized church revenues, while Isabella and her treasurer the Catholic bishop George Martinuzzi (d. 1551) secularised the estates of the Transylvanian bishopric. The Transylvanian Saxons adopted the Augsburg Confession in 1544; five years later, five free royal boroughs accepted an Evangelical confession in Royal Hungary.

Two former Catholic priests Mátyás Dévai Bíró (d. 1547) and Mihály Sztárai (d. 1575) were among the first Hungarian pastors to teach Zwinglian Eucharistic theology. "Sacramentarianism" (the denial of Christ's presence in the Eucharist) and rebaptism were outlawed by the Diet in Royal Hungary in 1548. John Sigismund was open to religious innovations. Under the influence of his court chaplain Ferenc Dávid (d. 1579), he adhered to Reformed theology from 1562, and accepted antitrinitarian views during the last years of his life. (Note: An exceptionally flexible theologian, Ferenc Dávid was bishop of the Evangelical, Reformed and Unitarian Churches during his life. John Sigismund was also heavily influenced by his antitrinitarian court physician Giorgio Biandrata (d. 1588).) The Edict of Torda legalised three Protestant denominations—Evangelical, Reformed and Unitarian—in eastern Hungary in 1568. Eastern Hungary transformed into the autonomous Principality of Transylvania under Ottoman suzerainty in 1570. The coexistence of four officially recognised churches—Catholicism and the three legalised Protestant denominations—remained a lasting feature of religious politics in Transylvania. The most radical antitrinitarians rejected the New Testament and held Saturday (or Sabbath) as weekly holiday; hence they were called Sabbatarians.

=== Warsaw Confederation ===
As the Bohemian Brethren were famed for their diligence, many Polish aristocrats eagerly settled them on their estates. Ethnic Poles became receptive to Protestant ideas, especially to Calvin's theology from the 1540s. The Hetman Jan Tarnowski (d. 1561) entered into correspondence with Calvin in 1540; in 1542, Jan Łaski (d. 1560) converted although his uncle (and namesake) had been the Primate of Poland. In 1548, Sigismund the Old's tolerant son Sigismund II Augustus (r. 1548–1572) ascended the throne. Two years later, the first synod of the Polish Reformed Church assembled at Pińczów. Proposals for the introduction of vernacular liturgy and communion in both kinds, and the abolition of clerical celibacy were forwarded by Sigismund Augustus to the Holy See but Pope Paul IV (r. 1555–1559) rejected them. The Catholic prelates tried to put Protestant nobles and married priests on trial for heresy but the legislative assembly, or Sejm suspended such persecutions on the initiative of the Protestant Marshal of the Sejm Rafał Leszczyński and Tarnowski in 1552. In 1556, Łaski organised a synod in the hope of reuniting all non-Lutheran Protestants but failed. At the meeting, Piotr of Goniądz (d. 1573) openly attacked infant baptism and the doctrine of Trinity. The antitrinitarian Polish Brethren established their own church, known as Minor Church in contrast with the Reformed Major Church. From 1565, Polish nobles could no more be persecuted on religious grounds which allowed them to freely choose between competing theologies. By this time, around one-fifth of the nobility had converted to the Reformed faith, and most secular members of the Senate were Protestant. Relationship between Poland and Lithuania was redefined by the 1569 Union of Lublin which created the Polish–Lithuanian Commonwealth. After Sigismund Augustus died, the Sejm passed the Warsaw Confederation prescribing that only candidates who promised to protect religious freedom could be elected king.

=== Regional conflicts ===
The continuous expansion of Protestantism stopped in Germany after the Peace of Augsburg. The Bavarian duke Albert V (r. 1550–1579) took the lead of recatholicisation. He overcame the opposition of Evangelical nobles, and exiled all clerics who refused to take the Tridentine oath. With Albert's support, the Jesuits opened a college in Ingolstadt that accepted Evangelical and Hussite students. Emperor Ferdinand I's eldest son and successor, Maximilian II (r. 1564–1576) pursued a tolerant religious policy but his brothers, Ferdinand II of the Tyrol (r. 1564–1595) and Charles II of Inner Austria (r. 1564–1590) were determined to subdue their Protestant subjects. After the predominantly Evangelical Estates of Inner Austria who controlled taxation extracted concessions from Charles II, he promoted Catholicism by appointing Catholics to state offices even if he needed to hire Bavarian and Tyrolian nobles.

Interreligious conflicts led to wars in many regions of Central Europe. The Cologne War broke out after Gebhard Truchsess von Waldburg, Archbishop-elector of Cologne (r. 1577–1583), abandoned Catholicism and married his Protestant lover Agnes von Mansfeld-Eisleben (d. 1637) in 1582. The war ended with the victory of his Catholic opponent Ernest (r. 1583–1612), a younger son of Albert V. The Strasbourg Bishops' War began when both the Catholic and Protestant canons of the Strasbourg Cathedral elected their own candidate to the see of Strasbourg in 1592. At the end, the Protestant candidate Johann Georg von Brandenburg (d. 1624) renounced in favor of his opponent Charles of Lorraine (r. 1592–1607).

Charles II's son and successor Ferdinand II (r. 1590–1637) set up "reformation commissions"—a group of clerics and state officials led by a senior clergyman—to visit the Inner Austrian parishes between 1598 and 1601. The commissioners seized and destroyed Evangelical churches, burned Protestant books and expelled Evangelical priests, often with the support of the local (mainly Slovenian) peasantry. His cousin Emperor Rudolf II (r. 1576–1612) introduced anti-Protestant measures in Royal Hungary and Transylvania, provoking a rebellion. The Ottomans supported the rebels whose leader, the Reformed aristocrat Stephen Bocskai was proclaimed prince of Transylvania (r. 1605–1606). Rudolph appointed his brother Matthias to conduct negotiations with Bocskai, and the peace treaty sanctioned the freedom of the Evangelical and Reformed churches in Royal Hungary in 1606. Rudolph was forced to cede Hungary, Austria and Moravia to Matthias in 1608, and to confirm religious freedom in Bohemia in 1609.

== Reformation outside Germany ==
The Reformation also spread widely throughout Europe, starting with Bohemia, in the Czech lands, and, over the next few decades, to other countries.

=== Nordic countries ===
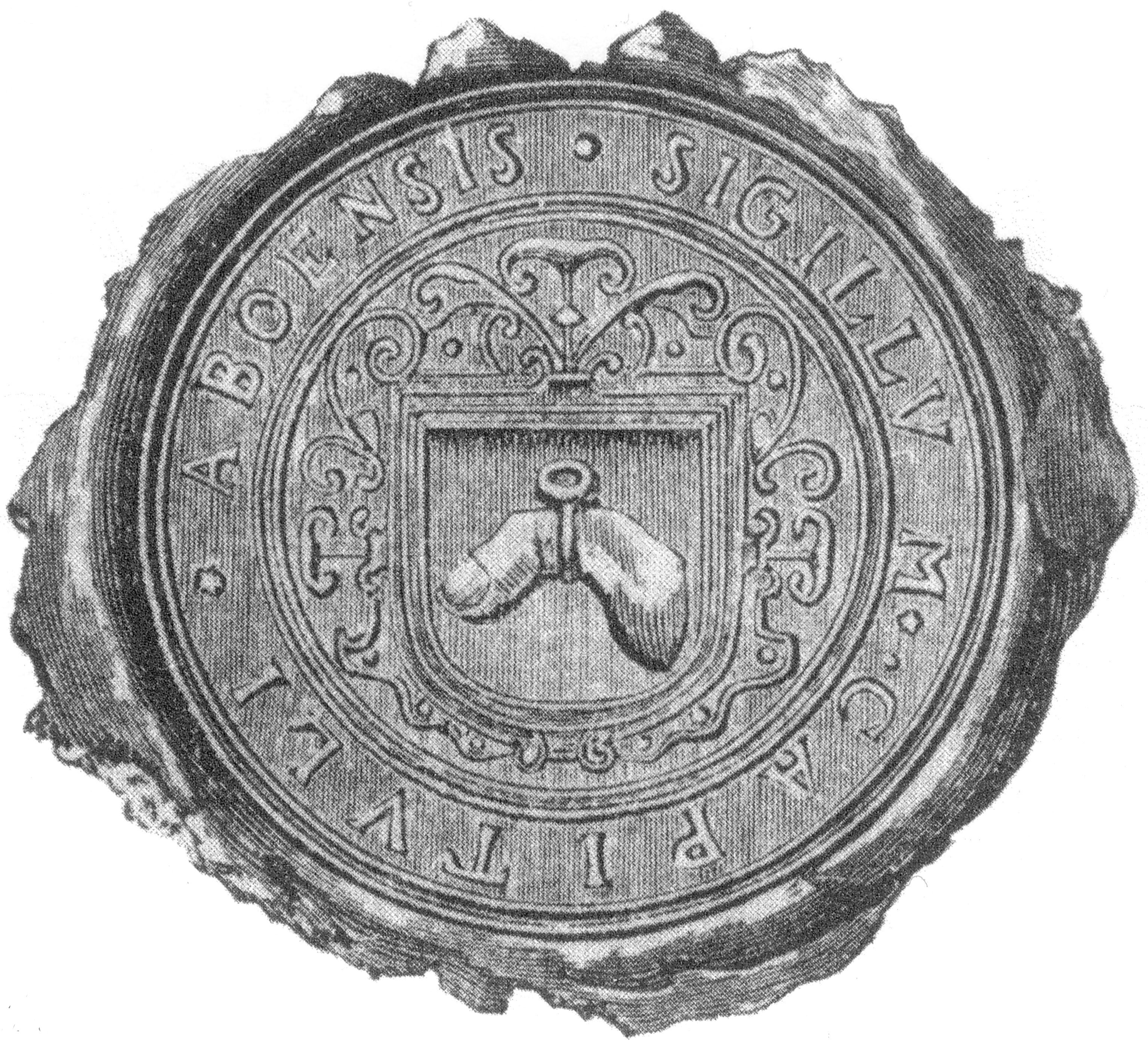
The seal of the Diocese of Turku (Finland) during the 16th and 17th centuries featured the finger of St Henry. The post-Reformation diocese included the relic of a pre-Reformation saint in its seal.

All of Scandinavia ultimately adopted Lutheranism over the course of the 16th century, as the monarchs of Denmark (who also ruled Norway and Iceland) and Sweden (who also ruled Finland) converted to that faith.

==== Iceland ====
Luther's influence had already reached Iceland before King Christian's decree. The Germans fished near Iceland's coast, and the Hanseatic League engaged in commerce with the Icelanders. These Germans raised a Lutheran church in Hafnarfjörður as early as 1533. Through German trade connections, many young Icelanders studied in Hamburg. In 1538, when the kingly decree of the new church ordinance reached Iceland, bishop Ögmundur and his clergy denounced it, threatening excommunication for anyone subscribing to the German "heresy". In 1539, the King sent a new governor to Iceland, Klaus von Mervitz, with a mandate to introduce reform and take possession of church property. Von Mervitz seized a monastery in Viðey with the help of his sheriff, Dietrich of Minden, and his soldiers. They drove the monks out and seized all their possessions, for which they were promptly excommunicated by Ögmundur.

=== Great Britain ===
==== England ====
The English Reformation is a complex historical series of events and reversals, whose nature and effect has been debated by historians. The results of the reformation included an established church with a "Prayer Book consciously aligned with Swiss theology,...(but) the most elaborate liturgy of any Protestant Church in Europe" practiced in Cathedrals, with plain, sermon-centred services in parish churches, politically imposed by a "literate Protestant elite".

According to political historian Gregory Slysz "The dissolution of the monasteries [...] brought social catastrophe to England" for the next 50 or so years, due to the closure of the numerous associated urban almshouses for poor relief and hospitals, worsened by spiraling inflation and a doubling of the population. Popular revolts by grassroots Catholics against the changes, such as the Prayer Book Rebellion in the South and the Pilgrimage of Grace and Bigod's rebellion in the North, were ruthlessly put down by government forces with the loss of thousands of lives.

===== English North America =====
The most famous emigration to America was the migration of Puritan separatists from the Anglican Church of England. They fled first to Holland, and then later to America to establish the English colony of Massachusetts in New England, which later became one of the original United States. These Puritan separatists were also known as "the Pilgrims". After establishing a colony at Plymouth (which became part of the colony of Massachusetts) in 1620, the Puritan pilgrims received a charter from the King of England that legitimised their colony, allowing them to do trade and commerce with merchants in England, in accordance with the principles of mercantilism.

The Pilgrims held radical Protestant disapproval of Christmas, and its celebration was outlawed in Boston from 1659 to 1681. The ban was revoked in 1681 by the English-appointed governor Edmund Andros, who also revoked a Puritan ban on festivities on Saturday nights. Nevertheless, it was not until the mid-19th century that celebrating Christmas became fashionable in the Boston region.

==== Wales ====
Bishop Richard Davies and dissident Protestant cleric John Penry introduced Calvinist theology to Wales. In 1588, the Bishop of Llandaff published the entire Bible in the Welsh language. The translation had a significant impact upon the Welsh population and helped to firmly establish Protestantism among the Welsh people. The Welsh Protestants used the model of the Synod of Dort of 1618–1619. Calvinism developed through the Puritan period, following the restoration of the monarchy under Charles II, and within Wales' Calvinistic Methodist movement. However few copies of Calvin's writings were available before the mid-19th century.

==== Scotland ====
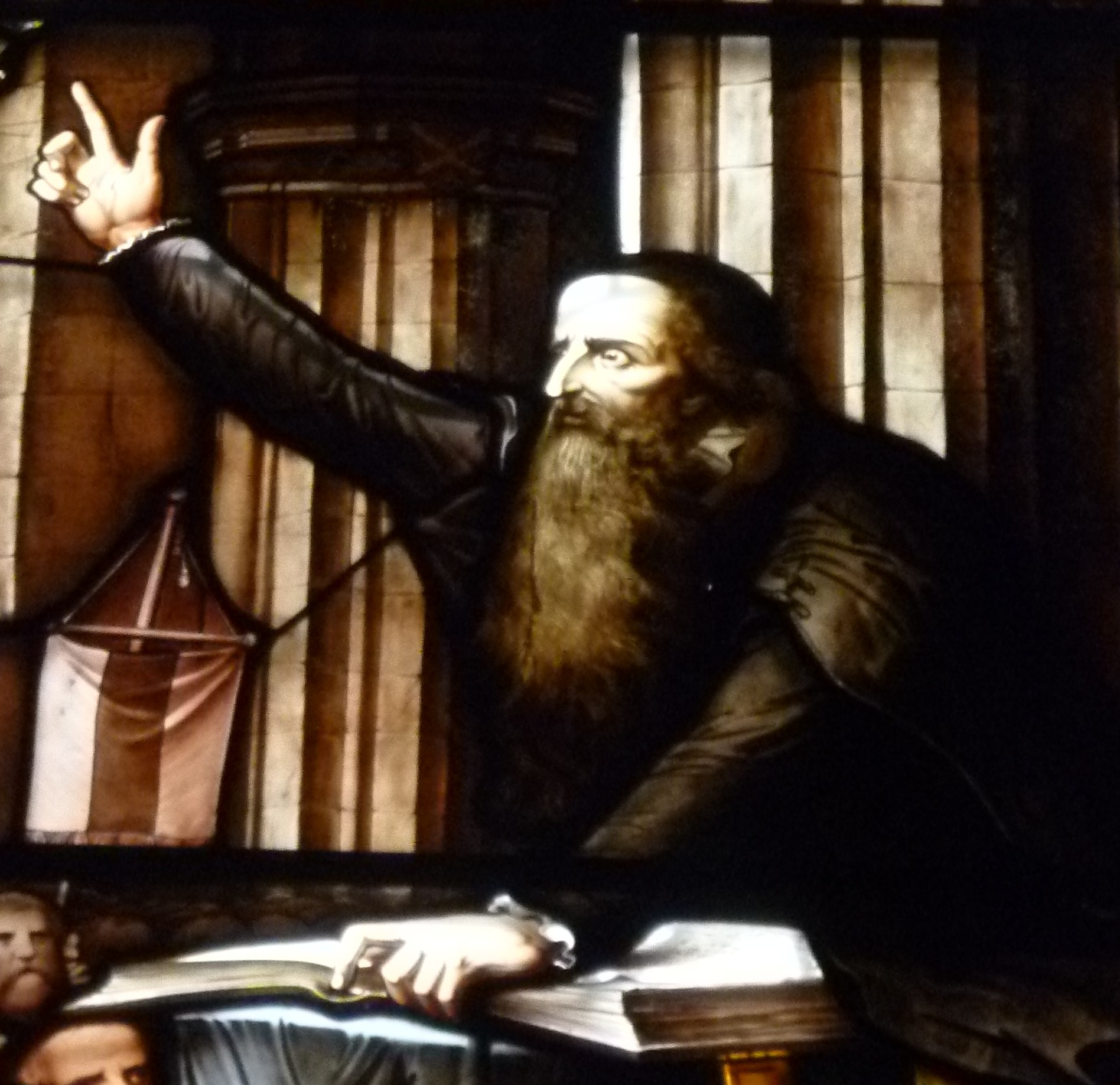
John Knox was a leading figure in the Scottish Reformation.

The Reformation in Scotland's case culminated ecclesiastically in the establishment of a church along reformed lines, and politically in the triumph of English influence over that of France. John Knox is regarded as the leader of the Scottish reformation.

The Reformation Parliament of 1560 repudiated the pope's authority by the Papal Jurisdiction Act 1560, forbade the celebration of the Mass and approved a Protestant Confession of Faith. It was made possible by a revolution against French hegemony under the regime of the regent Mary of Guise, who had governed Scotland in the name of her absent daughter Mary, Queen of Scots (then also Queen of France).

Although Protestantism triumphed relatively easily in Scotland, the exact form of Protestantism remained to be determined. The 17th century saw a complex struggle between Presbyterianism (particularly the Covenanters) and Episcopalianism. The Presbyterians eventually won control of the Church of Scotland, which went on to have an important influence on Presbyterian churches worldwide, but Scotland retained a relatively large Episcopalian minority.

=== France ===
Catholicism remained the official state religion, and the fortunes of French Protestants gradually declined over the next century, culminating in Louis XIV's Edict of Fontainebleau (1685), which revoked the Edict of Nantes and made Catholicism the sole legal religion of France, leading some Huguenots to live as Nicodemites. In response to the Edict of Fontainebleau, Frederick William I, Elector of Brandenburg declared the Edict of Potsdam (October 1685), giving free passage to Huguenot refugees and tax-free status to them for ten years.

In the late 17th century, 150,000–200,000 Huguenots fled to England, the Netherlands, Prussia, Switzerland, and the English and Dutch overseas colonies. A significant community in France remained in the Cévennes region. A separate Protestant community, of the Lutheran faith, existed in the newly conquered province of Alsace, its status not affected by the Edict of Fontainebleau.

=== Spain ===
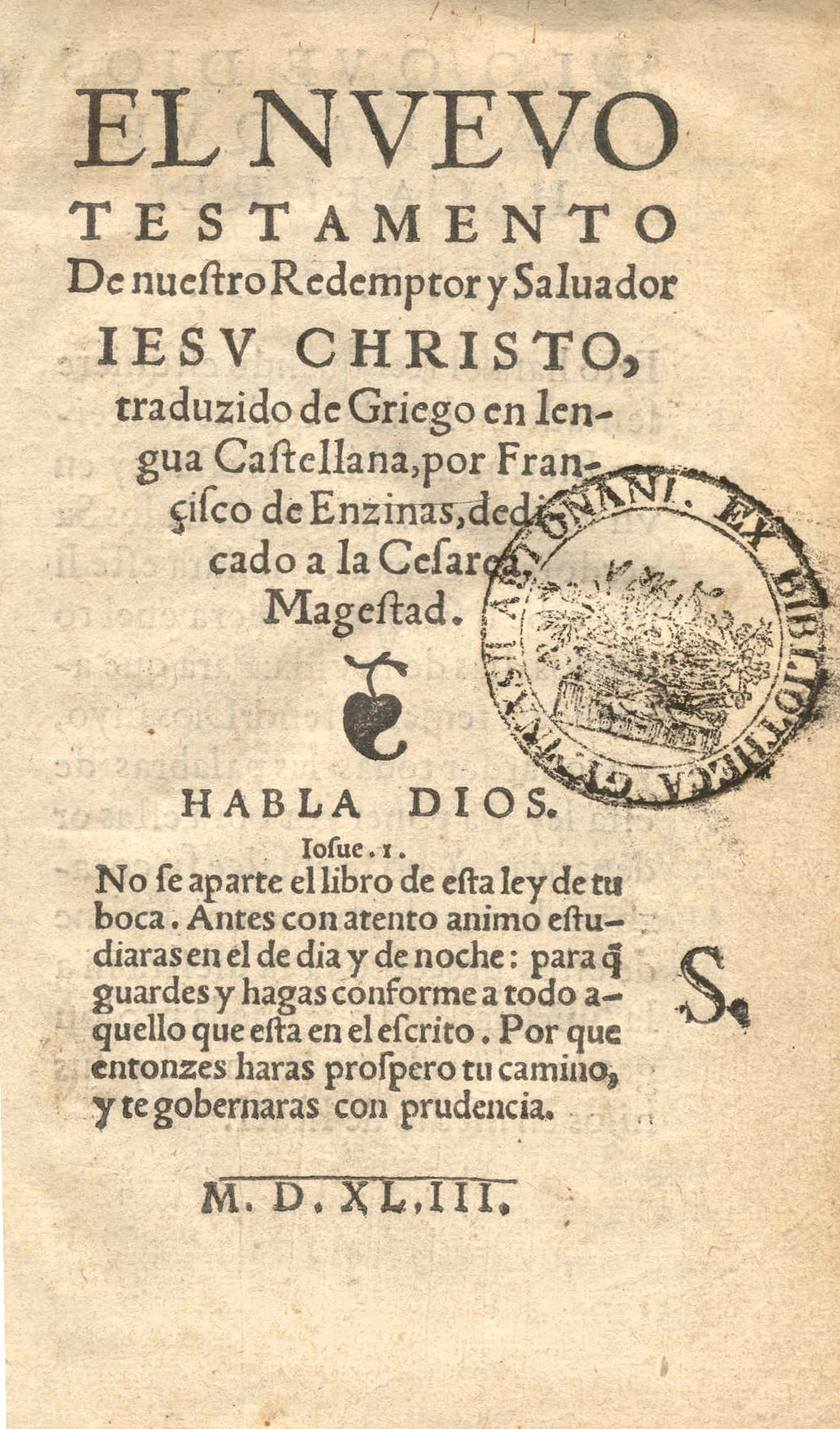
The New Testament translated by Francisco de Enzinas into the Spanish language (Castilian), published in Antwerp (1543)

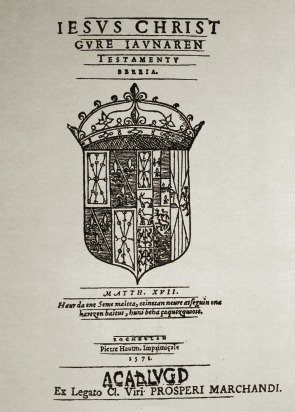
The New Testament translated by Joanes Leizarraga into the Basque language (1571) on the orders of Navarre's Calvinist queen, Jeanne III of Navarre

In the early 16th century, Spain had a different political and cultural milieu from its Western and Central European neighbours in several respects, which affected the mentality and the reaction of the nation towards the Reformation. Spain, which had only recently managed to complete the reconquest of the Peninsula from the Moors in 1492, had been preoccupied with converting the Muslim and Jewish populations of the newly conquered regions through the establishment of the Spanish Inquisition in 1478. The rulers of the nation stressed political, cultural, and religious unity, and by the time of the Lutheran Reformation, the Spanish Inquisition was already 40 years old and had the capability of quickly persecuting any new movement that the leaders of the Catholic Church perceived or interpreted to be religious heterodoxy. Charles V did not wish to see Spain or the rest of Habsburg Europe divided, and in light of continual threat from the Ottomans, preferred to see the Catholic Church reform itself from within. This led to a Counter-Reformation in Spain in the 1530s. During the 1520s, the Spanish Inquisition had created an atmosphere of suspicion and sought to root out any religious thought seen as suspicious. As early as 1521, the Pope had written a letter to the Spanish monarchy warning against allowing the unrest in Northern Europe to be replicated in Spain. Between 1520 and 1550, printing presses in Spain were tightly controlled and any books of Protestant teaching were prohibited.

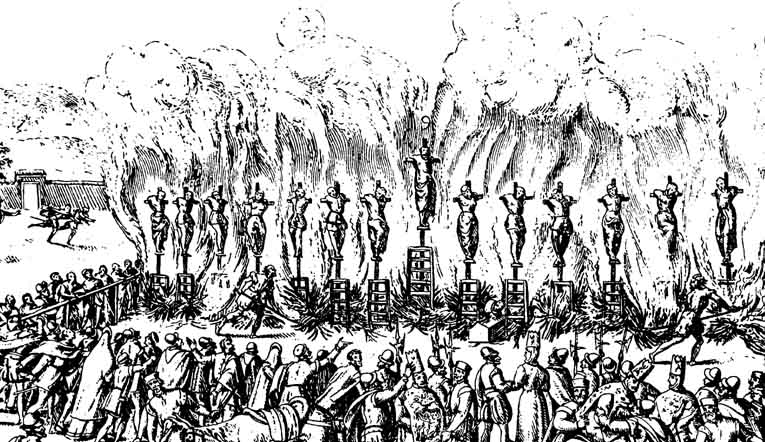
Contemporary illustration of the auto-da-fé of Valladolid, in which fourteen Protestants were burned at the stake for their faith, on 21 May 1559

Between 1530 and 1540, Protestantism in Spain was still able to gain followers clandestinely, and in cities such as Seville and Valladolid adherents would secretly meet at private houses to pray and study the Bible. Protestants in Spain were estimated at between 1000 and 3000, mainly among intellectuals who had seen writings such as those of Erasmus. Notable reformers included Juan Gil and Juan Pérez de Pineda who subsequently fled and worked alongside others such as Francisco de Enzinas to translate the Greek New Testament into the Spanish language, a task completed by 1556. Protestant teachings were smuggled into Spain by Spaniards such as Julián Hernández, who in 1557 was condemned by the Inquisition and burnt at the stake. Under Philip II, conservatives in the Spanish church tightened their grip, and those who refused to recant such as Rodrigo de Valer were condemned to life imprisonment. On 21 May 1559, sixteen Spanish Lutherans were burnt at the stake; 14 were strangled before being burnt, while two were burnt alive. In October another 30 were executed. Spanish Protestants who were able to flee the country were to be found in at least a dozen cities in Europe, such as Geneva, where some of them embraced Calvinist teachings. Those who fled to England were given support by the Church of England.

The Kingdom of Navarre, although by the time of the Protestant Reformation a minor principality territoriality restricted to southern France, had French Huguenot monarchs, including Henry IV of France and his mother, Jeanne III of Navarre, a devout Calvinist.

Upon the arrival of the Protestant Reformation, Calvinism reached some Basques through the translation of the Bible into the Basque language by Joanes Leizarraga. As Queen of Navarre, Jeanne III commissioned the translation of the New Testament into Basque (Note: See the wikipedia entry on Joanes Leizarraga, the priest who did the translation. His manuscript is considered to be a cornerstone in Basque literature, and a pioneering attempt towards Basque language standardization.) and Béarnese for the benefit of her subjects.

=== Italy ===
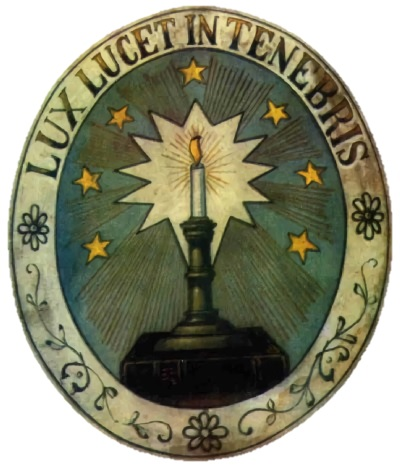
Waldensian symbol Lux lucet in tenebris ("Light glows in the darkness")

Word of the Protestant reformers reached Italy in the 1520s but never caught on. Its development was stopped by the Counter-Reformation, the Inquisition and popular disinterest. Not only was the Church highly aggressive in seeking out and suppressing heresy, but there was a shortage of Protestant leadership. No-one made a new Protestant translation of the Bible into Italian to compete with the existing Catholic vernacular translations; few tracts were written. No core of Protestantism emerged. The few preachers who did take an interest in "Lutheranism", as it was called in Italy, were suppressed, or went into exile to northern countries where their message was well received. As a result, the Reformation exerted almost no lasting influence in Italy, except for strengthening the Catholic Church and pushing for an end to ongoing abuses during the Counter-Reformation.

Some Protestants left Italy and became notable activists of the Eastern European Reformation, mainly in the Polish–Lithuanian Commonwealth (e.g. Giorgio Biandrata, Bernardino Ochino, Giovanni Alciato, Giovanni Battista Cetis, Fausto Sozzini, Francesco Stancaro and Giovanni Valentino Gentile some of whom propagated Nontrinitarianism there and were chief instigators of the movement of Polish Brethren.) Some also fled to England and Switzerland, including Peter Vermigli.

In 1532, the Waldensians, who had been already present centuries before the Reformation, aligned themselves and adopted the Calvinist theology. The Waldensian Church survived in the Western Alps through many persecutions and remains a Protestant church in Italy.

=== Slovenia ===
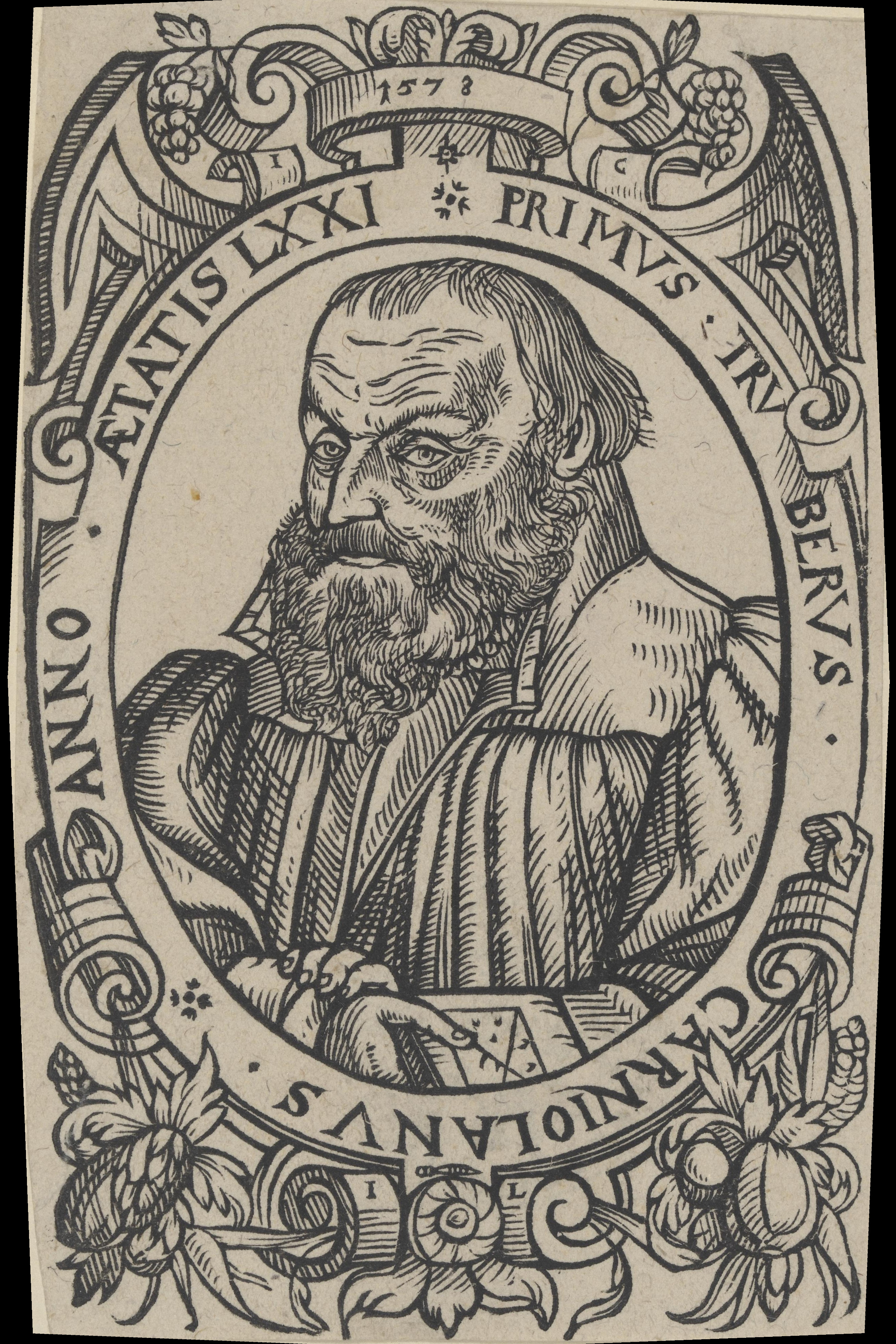
Primož Trubar, a Lutheran reformer in Slovenia

Primož Trubar is notable for consolidating the Slovene language and is considered to be the key figure of Slovenian cultural history, in many aspects a major Slovene historical personality. He was the key figure of the Protestant Church of the Slovene Lands, as he was its founder and its first superintendent. The first books in Slovene, Catechismus and Abecedarium, were written by Trubar.

=== Greece ===
The Protestant teachings of the Western Church were also briefly adopted within the Eastern Orthodox Church through the Greek Patriarch Cyril Lucaris in 1629 with the publishing of the Confessio (Calvinistic doctrine) in Geneva. Motivating factors in their decision to adopt aspects of the Reformation included the historical rivalry and mistrust between the Greek Orthodox and the Catholic Churches along with their concerns of Jesuit priests entering Greek lands in their attempts to propagate the teachings of the Counter-Reformation to the Greek populace. He subsequently sponsored Maximos of Gallipoli's translation of the New Testament into the Modern Greek language and it was published in Geneva in 1638. Upon Lucaris's death in 1638, the conservative factions within the Eastern Orthodox Church held two synods: the Synod of Constantinople (1638) and Synod of Iași (1642) criticising the reforms and, in the 1672 convocation led by Dositheos, they officially condemned the Calvinistic doctrines.

== Spread ==
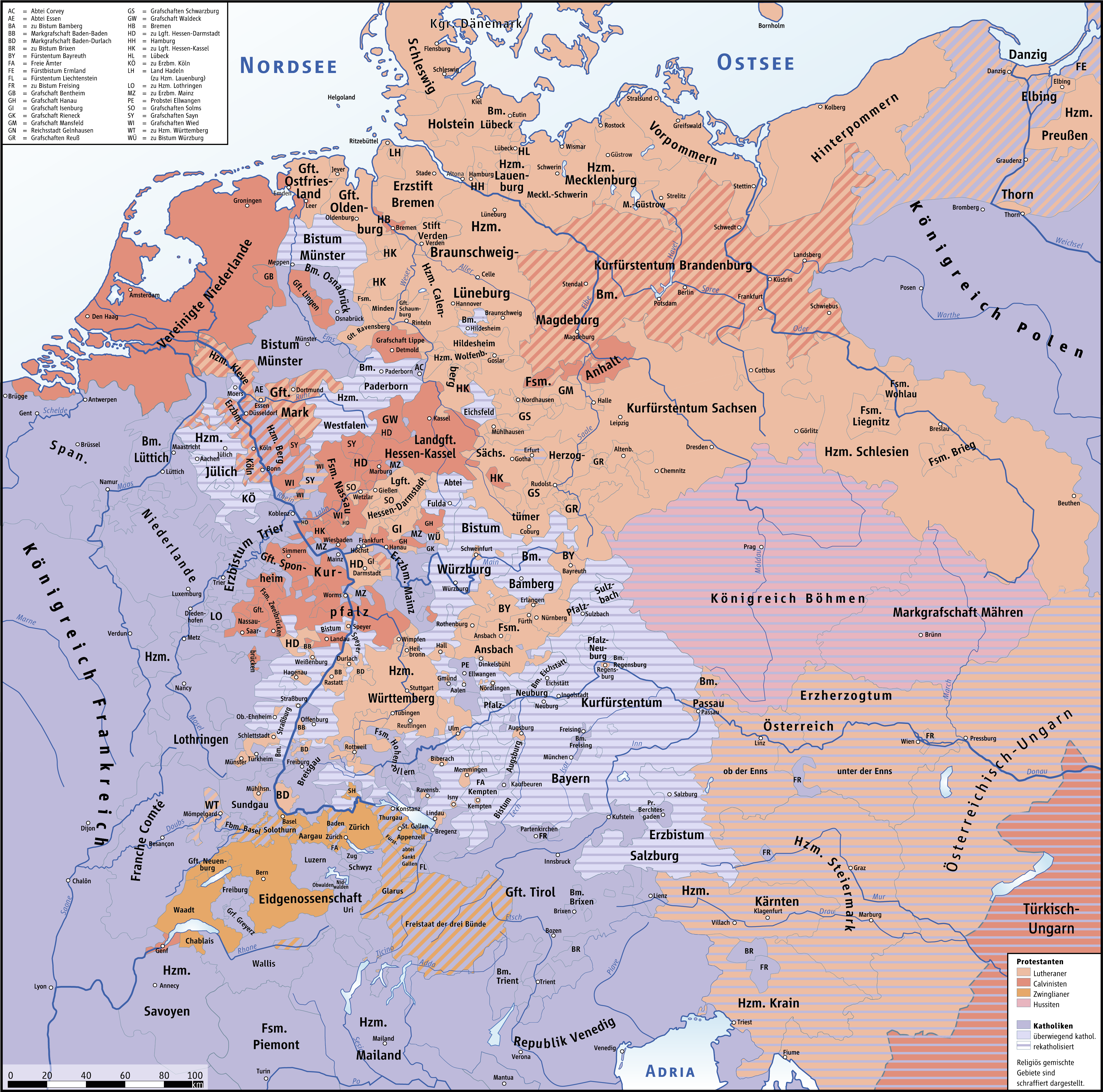
Religious fragmentation in Central Europe at the outbreak of the Thirty Years' War (1618)

The Reformation spread throughout Europe beginning in 1517, reaching its peak between 1545 and 1620. The greatest geographical extent of Protestantism occurred at some point between 1545 and 1620. In 1620, the Battle of White Mountain defeated Protestants in Bohemia (now the Czech Republic) who sought to have the 1609 Letter of Majesty upheld.

The Thirty Years' War began in 1618 and brought a drastic territorial and demographic decline when the House of Habsburg introduced counter-reformational measures throughout their vast possessions in Central Europe. Although the Thirty Years' War concluded with the Peace of Westphalia, the French Wars of the Counter-Reformation continued, as well as the expulsion of Protestants in Austria.

Approximation of the Reformation at its peak, superimposed on modern European borders

Approximations of the Reformation & the Counter-Reformation at the commonly-used end year of 1648, superimposed on modern European borders

According to a 2020 study in the American Sociological Review, the Reformation spread earliest to areas where Luther had pre-existing social relations, such as mail correspondents, and former students, as well as where he had visited. The study argues that these social ties contributed more to the Reformation's early breakthroughs than the printing press.

== Conclusion and legacy ==
There is no universal agreement on the exact or even the approximate date the Reformation ended. Various interpretations emphasise different dates, entire periods, or argue that the Reformation never really ended. However, there are a few popular interpretations. The Peace of Augsburg in 1555 officially ended the religious struggle between the two groups and made the legal division of Christianity permanent within the Holy Roman Empire, allowing rulers to choose either Lutheranism or Catholicism as the official confession of their state. It could be considered to end with the enactment of the confessions of faith. Other suggested ending years relate to the Counter-Reformation or the 1648 Peace of Westphalia. From one Catholic perspective, the Second Vatican Council ended the Counter-Reformation.

- In the history of theology or philosophy, the Reformation era ended with the Age of Orthodoxy. The Orthodox Period, also termed the Scholastic Period, succeeded the Reformation with the 1545–63 Council of Trent, the 1562 Anglican Thirty-nine Articles, the 1580 Book of Concord, and other confessions of faith. The Orthodox Era ended with the development of both Pietism and the Enlightenment.
- The Peace of Westphalia might be considered to be the event that ended the Reformation.

=== Thirty Years' War: 1618–1648 ===
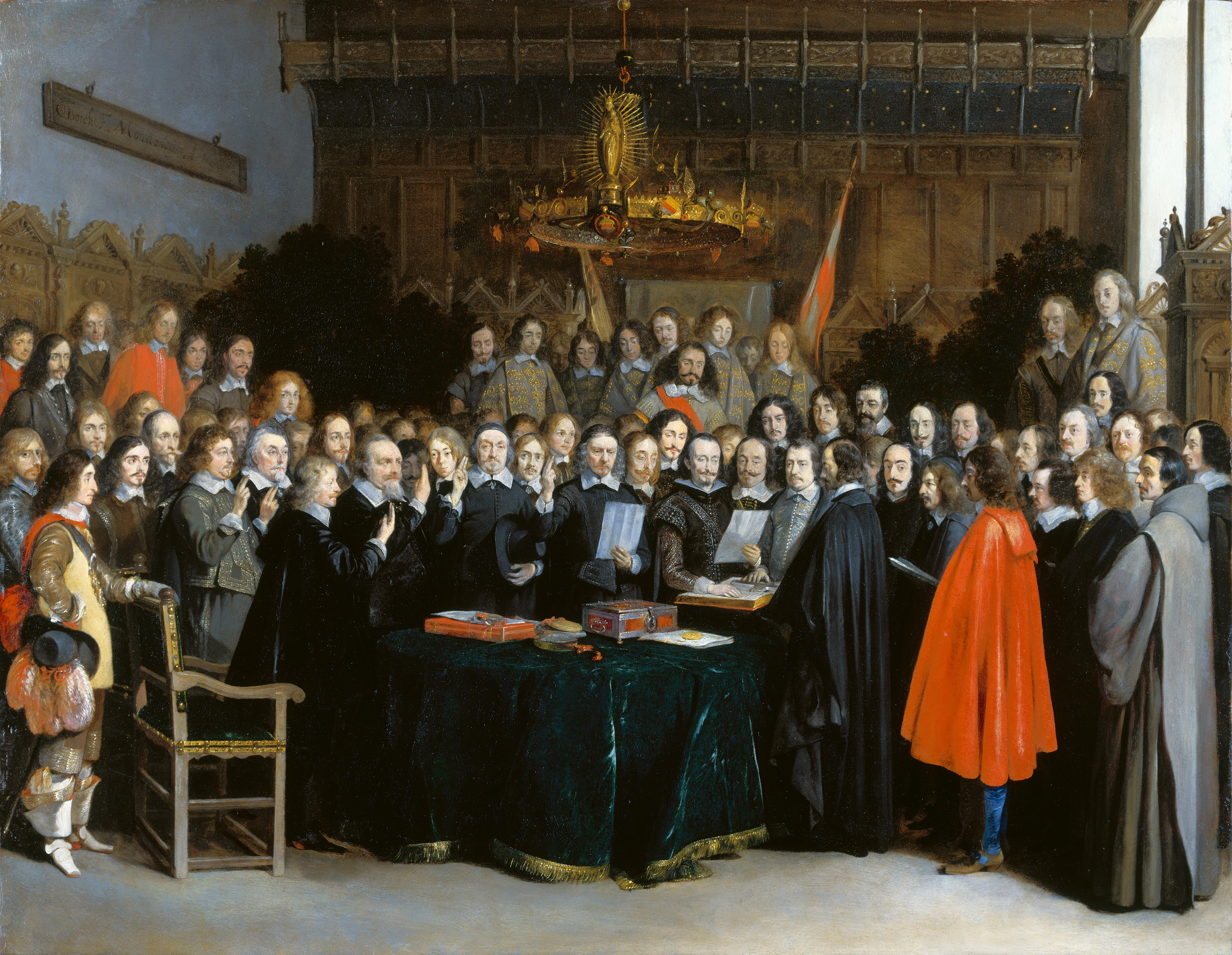
Treaty of Westphalia allowed Calvinism to be freely exercised, reducing the need for Crypto-Calvinism

The Reformation and Counter-Reformation era conflicts are termed the European wars of religion. In particular, the Thirty Years' War (1618–48) devastated much of Germany, killing between 25 and 40% of its population. The Catholic House of Habsburg and its allies fought against the Protestant princes of Germany, supported at various times by Denmark, Sweden and France. The Habsburgs, who ruled Spain, Austria, the Crown of Bohemia, Hungary, Slovene Lands, the Spanish Netherlands and much of Germany and Italy, were staunch defenders of the Catholic Church.

Two main tenets of the Peace of Westphalia, which ended the Thirty Years' War, were:

- All parties would now recognise the Peace of Augsburg of 1555, by which each prince would have the right to determine the religion of his own state, the options being Catholicism, Lutheranism, and now Calvinism (the principle of cuius regio, eius religio).
- Christians living in principalities where their denomination was not the established church were guaranteed the right to practice their faith in public during allotted hours and in private at their will.

The treaty also effectively ended the Papacy's pan-European political power. Pope Innocent X declared the treaty "null, void, invalid, iniquitous, unjust, damnable, reprobate, inane, empty of meaning and effect for all times" in his apostolic brief Zelo Domus Dei. European sovereigns, Catholic and Protestant alike, ignored his verdict.

=== Consequences of the Reformation ===
In nations that remained Catholic, or reverted to it, remaining Protestants sometimes lived as crypto-Protestants, also called Nicodemites, contrary to the urging of John Calvin, who wanted them to live their faith openly. Some crypto-Protestants have been identified as late as the 19th century after immigrating to Latin America.

In Britain from the Elizabethan period, dissenters called Recusants included both Catholic families and English Dissenters (Quakers, Ranters, Diggers, Grindletonians, etc.): almost the entire Irish population were recusants from the imposed Protestant Church of Ireland.

Travel and migration between countries became more difficult. "In 1500, a Christian could travel from one end of Europe to another without fear of persecution; by 1600, every form of Christianity was illegal somewhere in Europe." Two prolonged series of conflicts, the French Wars of Religion (1562–1598) and the Thirty Years' War (1618–1648) resulted in between six and sixteen million deaths.

As well as wars, most countries and colonies of Europe enacted discriminatory legislation, these only winding down in the late 18th century Age of Enlightenment. For example, the Popery Acts (1699 and 1704) disallowed Irish Catholic schooling and purchase of land, and changed inheritance law; it was repealed by the 1778 and 1791 Catholic Relief Acts. The Quebec Act (1774) re-allowed Catholics to worship and hold public office, but was one of the Intolerable Acts that precipitated the American Revolutionary War. In the countries of the Holy Roman Empire, the Patent of Toleration (1781, 1782) allowed religious toleration for non-Catholic Christians and Jews. In France, the Edict of Toleration (1787) proposed the non-persecution of non-Catholics and Jews. However vestiges of Reformation-period legal discrimination continued: for example, currently, a Roman Catholic, or someone married to a Roman Catholic, may not be crowned the British Monarch.

=== Radical Reformation ===
In parts of Germany, Switzerland, and Austria, a majority sympathised with the Radical Reformation despite intense persecution. Although the surviving proportion of the European population that rebelled against Catholic, Lutheran and Zwinglian churches was small, Radical Reformers wrote profusely and the literature on the Radical Reformation is disproportionately large, partly as a result of the proliferation of the Radical Reformation teachings in the United States.

Despite significant diversity among the early Radical Reformers, some "repeating patterns" emerged among many Anabaptist groups. Many of these patterns were enshrined in the Schleitheim Confession (1527) and include believers' (or adult) baptism, memorial view of the Lord's Supper, belief that Scripture is the final authority on matters of faith and practice, emphasis on the New Testament and the Sermon on the Mount, interpretation of Scripture in community, separation from the world and a two-kingdom theology, pacifism and nonresistance, communal ownership and economic sharing, belief in the freedom of the will, non-swearing of oaths, "yieldedness" (Gelassenheit) to one's community and to God, the ban (i.e., shunning), salvation through divinization (Vergöttung) and ethical living, and discipleship (Nachfolge Christi).

=== Literacy ===
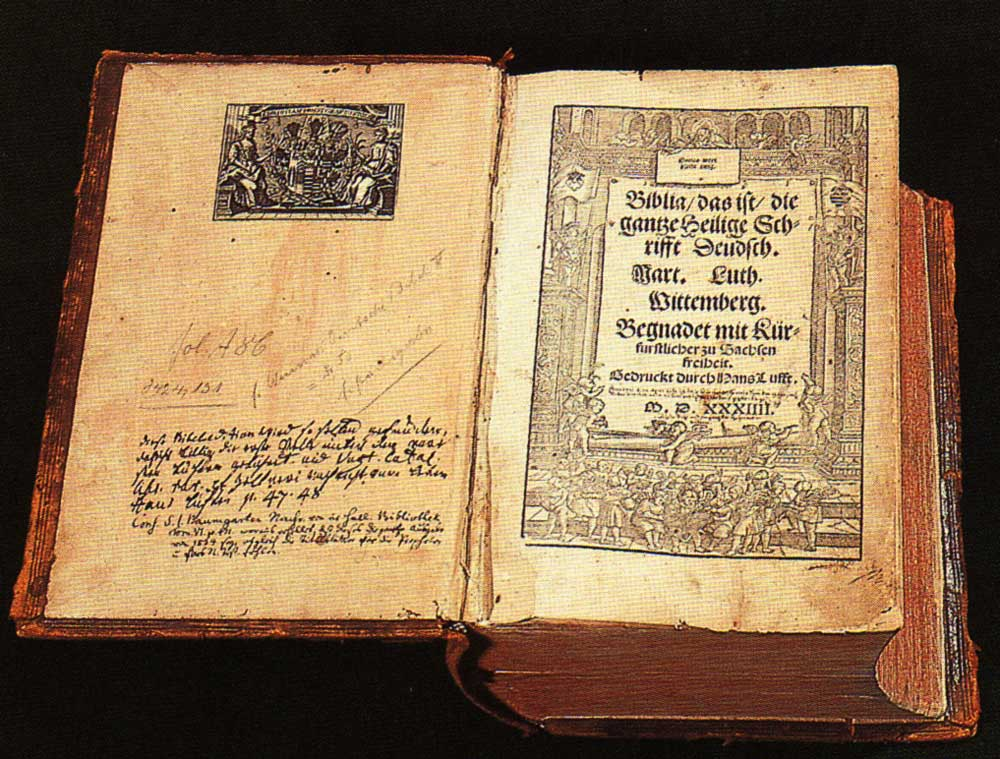
Modern High German translation of the Christian Bible by the Protestant reformer Martin Luther (1534). The widespread popularity of the Bible translated into High German by Luther helped establish modern Standard High German.

The Protestant Reformation was a triumph of literacy and the new printing press. (Note: In the end, while the Reformation emphasis on Protestants reading the Scriptures was one factor in the development of literacy, the impact of printing itself, the wider availability of printed works at a cheaper price, and the increasing focus on education and learning as key factors in obtaining a lucrative post, were also significant contributory factors.) Luther's translation of the Bible into High German (the New Testament was published in 1522; the Old Testament was published in parts and completed in 1534) was also decisive for the German language and its evolution from Early New High German to Modern Standard German. Luther's translation of the Bible promoted the development of non-local forms of language and exposed all speakers to forms of German from outside their own area. The publication of Luther's Bible was a decisive moment in the spread of literacy in early modern Germany, and stimulated as well the printing and distribution of religious books and pamphlets. From 1517 onward, religious pamphlets flooded Germany and much of Europe. (Note: In the first decade of the Reformation, Luther's message became a movement, and the output of religious pamphlets in Germany was at its height.)

By 1530, over 10,000 publications are known, with a total of ten million copies. The Reformation was thus a media revolution. Luther strengthened his attacks on Rome by depicting a "good" against "bad" church. From there, it became clear that print could be used for propaganda in the Reformation for particular agendas, although the term propaganda derives from the Catholic Congregatio de Propaganda Fide (Congregation for Propagating the Faith) from the Counter-Reformation. Reform writers used existing styles, cliches and stereotypes which they adapted as needed. Especially effective were writings in German, including Luther's translation of the Bible, his Smaller Catechism for parents teaching their children, and his Larger Catechism, for pastors.

Illustrations in the German Bible and in many tracts popularised Luther's ideas. Lucas Cranach the Elder (1472–1553), the great painter patronised by the electors of Wittenberg, was a close friend of Luther, and he illustrated Luther's theology for a popular audience. He dramatised Luther's views on the relationship between the Old and New Testaments, while remaining mindful of Luther's careful distinctions about proper and improper uses of visual imagery.

=== Outcomes ===
Protestants have developed their own culture, with major contributions in education, the humanities and sciences, the political and social order, the economy and the arts and many other fields. Various outcomes of the Reformation have been suggested by scholars: improved human capital formation, the disputed Protestant work ethic, improved economic development, the modern state, and "dark" outcomes:

==== Human capital formation ====
Claims include:

- Higher literacy rates, (Note: Some historians restrict this to the Mercantile countries (Holland, England) or the influence of the Age of Enlightenment.)
- Lower gender gap in school enrollment and literacy rates.
- Higher primary school enrollment.
- Higher public spending on schooling and better educational performance of military conscripts.
- Higher capability in reading, numeracy, essay writing, and history.

==== Protestant ethic ====
Claims include:

- More hours worked.
- Divergent stated attitudes about the absolute priority of work between Protestants and Catholics.
- Fewer referendums on leisure, state intervention, and redistribution in Swiss cantons with more Protestants.
- Lower life satisfaction when unemployed.
- Pro-market attitudes.
- Higher relative income growth in Protestant cities compared to Catholic cities (correlated with larger growth in Protestant city size.)

==== Economic development ====
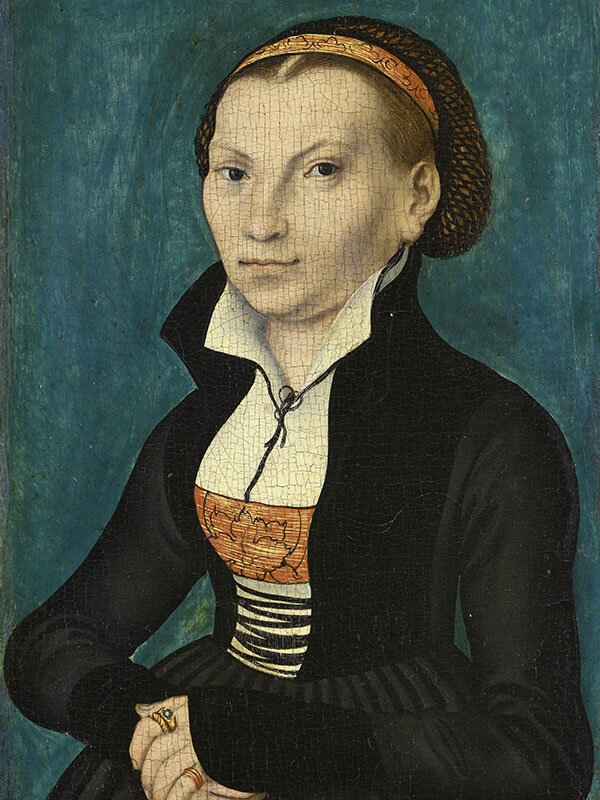
Katharina von Bora played a role in shaping social ethics during the Reformation.

Claims include:

- Different levels of income tax revenue per capita, % of labor force in manufacturing and services, and incomes of male elementary school teachers.
- Growth of Protestant cities.
- Greater entrepreneurship among religious minorities in Protestant states.
- Different social ethics facilitating impersonal trade.
- Industrialization.

==== Modern states ====
Claims include:

- The Reformation has been credited as a key factor in the development of the state system.
- The Reformation has been credited as a key factor in the formation of transnational advocacy movements.
- The Reformation impacted the Western legal tradition.
- Enabling professional bureaucracies to emerge in Europe.
- Establishment of state churches.
- Poor relief and social welfare regimes.
- James Madison noted that Martin Luther's doctrine of the two kingdoms marked the beginning of the modern conception of separation of church and state.
- The Calvinist and Lutheran doctrine of the lesser magistrate contributed to resistance theory in the Early Modern period and was employed in the United States Declaration of Independence.
- Reformers such as Calvin promoted mixed government and the separation of powers, which governments such as the United States subsequently adopted.

==== World demographics ====
World Christianity by tradition in 2024 as per World Christian Database
1. Catholic (48.6%)
2. Protestant (23.8%)
3. Independent (16.0%)
4. Orthodox (11.1%)
5. Other (0.50%)

Today, classical Protestantism (including Anglicans) has between 300 and 625 million worldwide adherents, up to one quarter of all Christians.

And general Protestantism—broadly defined to also include Evangelical, Pentecostal, non-conformist and non-denominationalists (Note: Over half of this population are in Modern Protestant denominations such as Pentecostal churches which are not derived from the historical Reformation denominations; and the remaining Historical denominations include Arminian denominations such as Methodists which do not hold to certain key Reformation doctrines, such as sola fide.)—constitutes the second-largest form of Christianity (after Catholicism), with between 850,000 and 1.17 billion adherents worldwide (between 40% and 45% of all Christians) (Note: Most current estimates place the world's Protestant population in the range of 800 million to more than 1 billion. For example, author Hans Hillerbrand estimated a total Protestant population of 833,457,000 in 2004, while a report by Gordon-Conwell Theological Seminary – 1,170,803,000 (with inclusion of independents as defined in this article) in 2024.) divided into an estimated 45,000 denominations.

==== Other outcomes ====
Other claims include:

- Witch trials became more common in regions or other jurisdictions where Protestants and Catholics contested the religious market.
- Christopher J. Probst, in his book Demonizing the Jews: Luther and the Protestant Church in Nazi Germany (2012), shows that a large number of German Protestant clergy and theologians during Nazi Germany used Luther's hostile publications towards the Jews and Judaism to justify at least in part the anti-Semitic policies of the National Socialists.
- In its decree on ecumenism, the Second Vatican Council of Catholic bishops declared that by contemporary dialogue that, while still holding views as the One, Holy, Catholic, and Apostolic Church, between the churches "all are led to examine their own faithfulness to Christ's will for the Church and accordingly to undertake with vigor the task of renewal and reform" (Unitatis Redintegratio, 4).
- Beer production switched from using herbs to hops.

=== Historiography ===
Margaret C. Jacob argues that there has been a dramatic shift in the historiography of the Reformation. Until the 1960s, historians focused their attention largely on the great leaders and theologians of the 16th century, especially Luther, Calvin, and Zwingli. Their ideas were studied in depth. However, the rise of the new social history in the 1960s led to looking at history from the bottom up, not from the top down. Historians began to concentrate on the values, beliefs and behavior of the people at large. She finds, "in contemporary scholarship, the Reformation is now seen as a vast cultural upheaval, a social and popular movement, textured and rich because of its diversity."

For example, historian John Bossy characterized the Reformation as a period where Christianity was re-cast not as "a community sustained by ritual acts, but as a teaching enforced by institutional structures," for Catholics as well as Protestants; (Note: "But in the Renaissance era, and even more so in the Reformation period which followed, reliance on symbol and image gave way to the privileging of the printed or spoken word. Peace remained a fundamental Christian aspiration, but ritual and sacrament gave way to persuasion and instruction as the means to achieve it."Duffy 2016.) (Note: "Until the seventeenth century, …Christianity meant a body of people, but since then it refers only to a body of beliefs." Lewis, Eleanor V. (June 1986). "(Review) Christianity in the West, 1400–1700. By John Bossy. New York: Oxford University Press, 1985". Church History. 55 (2): 225–26. doi:10.2307/3167429. JSTOR 3167429. S2CID 162279854.) and sin was re-cast from the seven deadly sins —wrong because antisocial— to transgressions of the Ten Commandments —wrong as affronts to God.

=== Music and art ===
Painting and sculpture

- Northern Mannerism
- Lutheran art
- German Renaissance Art
- Swedish art
- English art
- Woodcuts
- Art conflicts
- Beeldenstorm

Building

- Influence on church architecture

Literature

- Elizabethan
- Metaphysical poets
- Propaganda
- Welsh
- Scottish
- Anglo-Irish
- German
- Czech
- Swiss
- Slovak
- Sorbian
- Romanian
- Danish
- Faroese
- Norwegian
- Swedish
- Finnish
- Icelandic
- Dutch Renaissance and Golden Age
- Folklore of the Low Countries
- 16th century Renaissance humanism
- 16th century in poetry
- 16th century in literature
- English Renaissance theatre

Musical forms

- Hymnody of continental Europe
- Music of the British Isles
- Hymn tune
- Lutheran chorale
- Lutheran hymn
- Anglican church music
- Exclusive psalmody
- Anglican chant
- Homophony vs. Polyphony

Liturgies

- Reformed worship
- Calvin's liturgy
- Formula missae
- Deutsche Messe
- Ecclesiastical Latin
- Lutheran and Anglican Mass in music
- Cyclic mass vs. Paraphrase mass
- Roman vs. Sarum Rites
- Sequence (retained by Lutherans, mostly banned by Trent)

Hymnals

- First and Second Lutheran hymnals
- First Wittenberg hymnal
- Swenske songer
- Thomissøn's hymnal
- Ausbund
- Book of Common Prayer
- Metrical psalters
- Souterliedekens
- Book of Common Order
- Genevan Psalter
- Scottish Psalter

Secular music

- English Madrigal School
- Greensleeves
- German madrigals
- Moravian traditional music
- Meistersinger

Partly due to Martin Luther's love for music, music became important in Lutheranism. The study and practice of music was encouraged in Protestant majority countries. Songs such as the Lutheran hymns or the Calvinist Psalter became tools for the spread of Protestant ideas and beliefs, as well as identity flags. Similar attitudes developed among Catholics, who in turn encouraged the creation and use of music for religious purposes.

== See also ==
- Catholic Church and ecumenism
- Catholic-Protestant relations
- Criticism of Christianity
- Criticism of Protestantism
- Concordat of Worms
- Confessionalization
- European City of the Reformation
- Historiography of religion
- List of Protestant Reformers
- Protestantism in Germany
- Sectarian violence among Christians
- Women in the Protestant Reformation

== Bibliography ==
- Becker, Sascha O.; Pfaff, Steven; Rubin, Jared (2016). "Causes and Consequences of the Protestant Reformation". ESI Working Paper 16–13. ISSN 2572-1496.
- Bertoglio, Chiara (2017). Reforming Music. Music and the Religious Reformations of the Sixteenth Century. De Gruyter. ISBN 978-3-11-052081-1.
- Cameron, Euan (2012) [1991]. The European Reformation (2nd ed.). Oxford University Press. ISBN 978-0-19-954785-2.
- Cameron, Euan (1984). The Reformation of the Heretics: The Waldenses of the Alps, 1480–1580. Clarendon Press.
- Cantoni, Davide (May 2012). "Adopting a new religion: The case of Protestantism in 16th century Germany". The Economic Journal. 122 (560). Oxford University Press: 502–531. doi:10.1111/j.1468-0297.2012.02495.x. hdl:10230/19925. ISSN 0013-0133. JSTOR 41494446. S2CID 154412497.
- Collinson, Patrick (2005) [2003]. The Reformation. Phoenix. ISBN 978-0-7538-1863-3.
- Cross, F.L., ed. (2005). "Westphalia, Peace of". The Oxford Dictionary of the Christian Church. New York: Oxford University Press.
- Curuk, Malik; Smulders, Sjak (July 2016). "Malthus Meets Luther: The Economics Behind the German Reformation". CESifo Working Paper. 6010. Center for Economic Studies and ifo Institute (CESifo). ISSN 2364-1428.
- Daniel, David P. (1998) [1992]. "Hungary". In Pettegree, Andrew (ed.). The Early Reformation in Europe. Cambridge University Press. pp. 49–69. ISBN 978-0-521-39768-1.
- Davies, Norman (7 January 1996). Europe: A History. Oxford University Press. ISBN 978-0-19-820171-7.
- Diefendorf, Barbara B. (2006) [2004]. "The Religious Wars in France". In R. Po-Chia, Hsia (ed.). A Companion to the Reformation World. Blackwell Companions to European History. Blackwell Publishing. pp. 150–168. ISBN 978-1-4051-4962-4.
- Ditchfield, Simon (2022) [2015]. "Catholic Reformation and Renewal". In Marshall, Peter (ed.). The Oxford History of the Reformation. Oxford University Press. pp. 191–237. ISBN 978-0-19-289526-4.
- Dittmar, Jeremiah; Seabold, Skipper (August 2015). "Media, Markets and Institutional Change: Evidence from the Protestant Reformation". CEP Discussion Paper. 1367. The London School of Economics and Political Science. ISSN 2042-2695.
- Dixon, C. Scott (2012). Contesting the Reformation. Contesting the Past. Wiley-Blackwell. ISBN 978-1-4051-1323-6.
- Edwards, Mark U. (1994). Printing, Propaganda, and Martin Luther.
- Eire, Carlos (2022) [2015]. "Calvinism and the Reform of the Reformation". In Marshall, Peter (ed.). The Oxford History of the Reformation. Oxford University Press. pp. 95–143. ISBN 978-0-19-289526-4.
- Estep, William R (1986). Renaissance & Reformation. Grand Rapids, MI: Eerdmans. ISBN 978-0-8028-0050-3.
- Firpo, Massimo (2004). "The Italian Reformation". In Hsia, R. Po-chia (ed.). A Companion to the Reformation World. Blackwell. pp. 169–184. ISBN 978-1-4051-7865-5.
- Firpo, Massimo (May 2016). "Rethinking "Catholic Reform" and "Counter-Reformation": What Happened in Early Modern Catholicism—a View from Italy". Journal of Early Modern History. 20 (3). Brill: 293–312. doi:10.1163/15700658-12342506. ISSN 1385-3783.
- Gordon, Bruce (2022) [2015]. "Late Medieval Christianity". In Marshall, Peter (ed.). The Oxford History of the Reformation. Oxford University Press. pp. 1–50. ISBN 978-0-19-289526-4.
- Grell, Ole Peter (1998) [1992]. "Scandinavia". In Pettegree, Andrew (ed.). The Early Reformation in Europe. Cambridge University Press. pp. 94–119. ISBN 978-0-521-39768-1.
- Grell, Ole Peter (2006) [2000]. "Scandinavia". In Pettegree, Andrew (ed.). The Reformation World. Routledge. pp. 257–276. ISBN 978-0-415-16357-6.
- Hamilton, Bernard (2003) [1986]. Religion in the Medieval West (2nd ed.). Hodder Education. ISBN 978-0-340-80839-9.
- Hamm, Berndt (1999). "What was the Reformation Doctrine of Justification". In Dixon, C. Scott (ed.). The German Reformation: The Essential Readings. Blackwell Essential Readings in History. Blackwell Publishers. pp. 53–90. ISBN 0-631-20811-9.
- Haude, Sigrun (2006) [2000]. "Anabaptism". In Pettegree, Andrew (ed.). The Reformation World. Routledge. pp. 237–256. ISBN 978-0-415-16357-6.
- Hjálmarsson, Jón R. (1993). History of Iceland: From the Settlement to the Present Day. Iceland Review.
- Hjálmarsson, Jón R. (2012) [2007]. History of Iceland: From the Settlement to the Present Day. Forlagið. ISBN 978-9979-53-513-3.
- Iyigun, Murat (November 2008). "Luther and Suleyman". The Quarterly Journal of Economics. 123 (4). Oxford University Press: 1465–1494. doi:10.1162/qjec.2008.123.4.1465. ISSN 0033-5533. JSTOR 40506214.
- Jacob, Margaret C. (1991). Living the Enlightenment: Freemasonry and Politics in Eighteenth-century Europe. Oxford University Press.
- Kaufmann, Thomas (2023). The Saved and the Damned: A History of the Reformation. Translated by Tony Crawford. Oxford University Press. ISBN 978-0-19-884104-3.
- Kim, Hyojoung; Pfaff, Steven (February 2012). "Structure and Dynamics of Religious Insurgency: Students and the Spread of the Reformation". American Sociological Review. 77 (2). American Sociological Association: 188–215. doi:10.1177/0003122411435905. ISSN 0003-1224. S2CID 144678806.
- Kingdon, Robert M. (2006) [2004]. "Calvin and Geneva". In R. Po-Chia, Hsia (ed.). A Companion to the Reformation World. Blackwell Companions to European History. Blackwell Publishing. pp. 105–117. ISBN 978-1-4051-4962-4.
- Kolb, Robert (2006) [2004]. "Martin Luther and the German Nation". In R. Po-Chia, Hsia (ed.). A Companion to the Reformation World. Blackwell Companions to European History. Blackwell Publishing. pp. 39–55. ISBN 978-1-4051-4962-4.
- Lindberg, Carter (2021) [1996]. The European Reformations (3rd ed.). Wiley-Blackwell. ISBN 978-1-119-64081-3.
- MacCulloch, Diarmaid (2003). The Reformation: A History. Viking. ISBN 0-670-03296-4.
- McGrath, Alister E. (2021) [1988]. Reformation Thought (5th ed.). John Wiley and Sons. ISBN 978-1-1197-5658-3.
- McGrath, Alister E. (2004) [1987]. The Intellectual Origins of the European Reformation (2nd ed.). Blackwell Publishing. ISBN 0-631-22940-X.
- Marshall, Peter (2009). The Reformation: A Very Short Introduction. Very Short Introductions. Oxford University Press. ISBN 978-0-19-923131-7.
- Marshall, Peter (2022) [2015]. "Britain's Reformations". In Marshall, Peter (ed.). The Oxford History of the Reformation. Oxford University Press. pp. 238–291. ISBN 978-0-19-289526-4.
- O'Malley, John (2006) [2004]. "The Society of Jesus". In R. Po-Chia, Hsia (ed.). A Companion to the Reformation World. Blackwell Companions to European History. Blackwell Publishing. pp. 223–236. ISBN 978-1-4051-4962-4.
- Palmitessa, James R. (2006) [2004]. "The Reformation in Bohemia and Poland". In R. Po-Chia, Hsia (ed.). A Companion to the Reformation World. Blackwell Companions to European History. Blackwell Publishing. pp. 185–204. ISBN 978-1-4051-4962-4.
- Pettegree, Andrew (2000a). The Reformation World. Routledge. ISBN 978-0-203-44527-3.
- Pettegree, Andrew (2000b). The Reformation World. Psychology Press. ISBN 978-0-415-16357-6.
- Pettegree, Andrew; Hall, Matthew (December 2004). "The Reformation and the Book: A Reconsideration". The Historical Journal. 47 (4): 785–808. doi:10.1017/S0018246X04003991. JSTOR 4091657. S2CID 145512622.
- Pfaff, Steven (12 March 2013). "The true citizens of the city of God: the cult of saints, the Catholic social order, and the urban Reformation in Germany". Theory and Society. 42 (2). Springer: 189–218. doi:10.1007/s11186-013-9188-x. ISSN 0304-2421. JSTOR 43694683. S2CID 144049459.
- Roper, Lyndal (2022) [2015]. "Martin Luther". In Marshall, Peter (ed.). The Oxford History of the Reformation. Oxford University Press. pp. 51–94. ISBN 978-0-19-289526-4.
- Rubin, Jared (2014). "Printing and Protestants: An Empirical Test of the Role of Printing in the Reformation". Review of Economics and Statistics. 96 (2): 270–286. doi:10.1162/REST_a_00368. S2CID 52885129.
- Stayer, James M. (2006) [2000]. "The German Peasants' War and the rural Reformation". In Pettegree, Andrew (ed.). The Reformation World. Routledge. pp. 127–145. ISBN 978-0-415-16357-6.
- Tóth, István György (2006) [2004]. "New Faith in Hungary, Turkish Hungary, and Transylvania". In R. Po-Chia, Hsia (ed.). A Companion to the Reformation World. Blackwell Companions to European History. Blackwell Publishing. pp. 205–220. ISBN 978-1-4051-4962-4.
- Weimer, Christoph (2004). "Luther and Cranach on Justification in Word and Image". Lutheran Quarterly. 18 (4): 387–405.
- Whaley, Joachim (2013) [2012]. Germany and the Holy Roman Empire: Volume I: Maximilian I to the Peace of Westphalia, 1493–1648. Oxford History of Early Modern Europe. Oxford University Press. ISBN 978-0-19-968882-1.
- Wickham, Chris (2016). Medieval Europe. Yale University Press. ISBN 978-0-300-20834-4.
