= Schmalkaldic War =

1546–1547 conflict in the Holy Roman Empire

- Part of European wars of religion
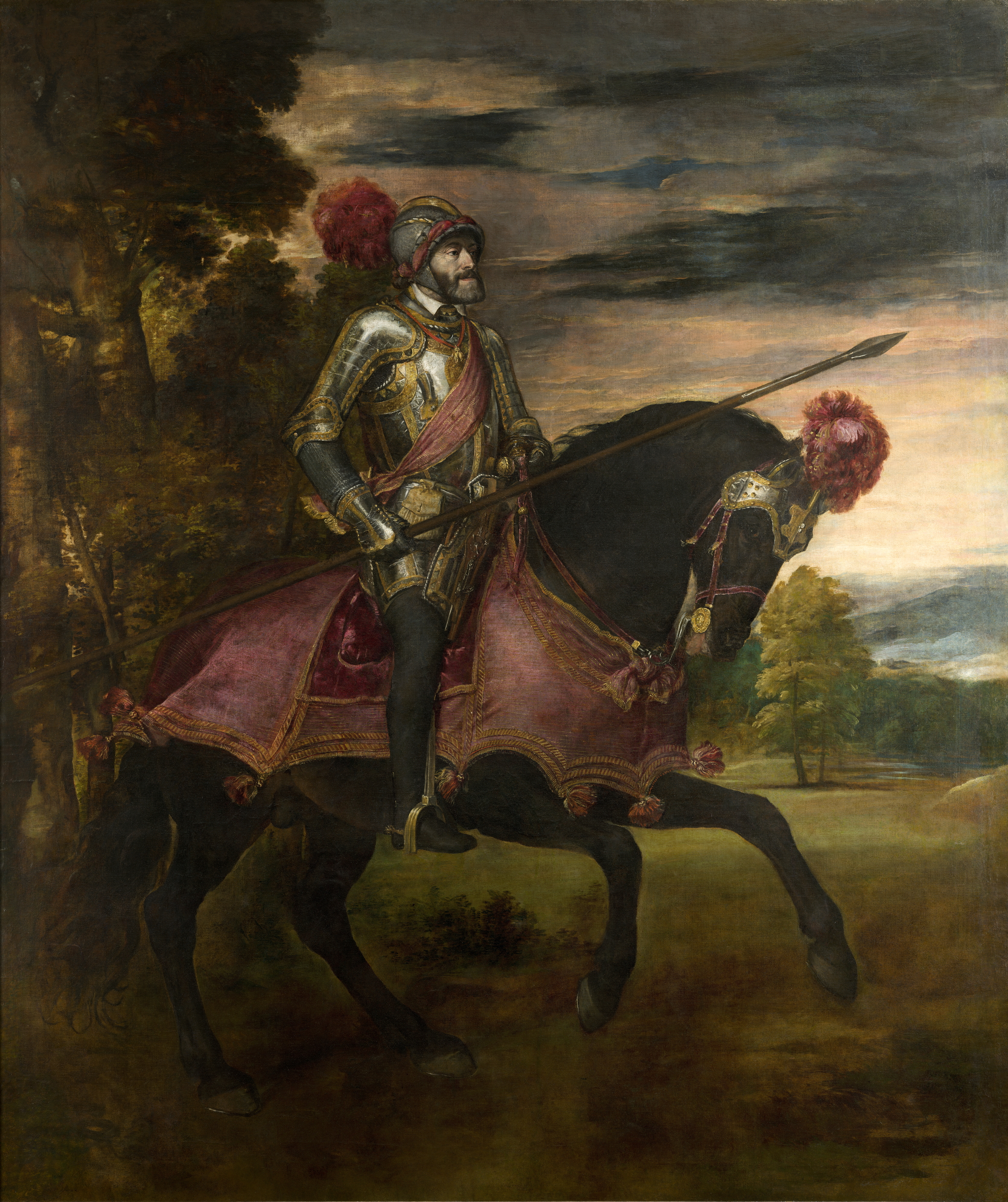
- Titian's Equestrian Portrait of Charles V (1548) celebrates Charles's victory at the Battle of Mühlberg.
Date	10 July 1546 – 23 May 1547
Location	Holy Roman Empire
Result	Imperial victory: Capitulation of Wittenberg: Schmalkaldic League dissolved, Saxon electoral dignity passed to the Albertine House of Wettin

Belligerents
Holy Roman Empire: Habsburg Austria; Electorate of Saxony; Bohemian Crown; Habsburg Spain; Habsburg Hungary Supported by: Papal States	Schmalkaldic League: Electorate of Saxony; Hesse; Electoral Palatinate; Bremen; Lübeck; Brunswick-Lüneburg; Württemberg; Pomerania-Wolgast; Anhalt-Köthen; Brandenburg-Küstrin; Lesser German states; Supported by: Kingdom of England

Commanders and leaders
Charles V; Ferdinand I; Archduke Maximilian; Duke of Alba; Maurice of Wettin; Ottavio Farnese	John Frederick I; Philip I; Frederick III; Ulrich I; Philip I; Wolfgang; Sebastian Schertlin von Burtenbach

Strength
1546; 56,000	1546; 50,000

The Schmalkaldic War (German: Schmalkaldischer Krieg; July 1546 – May 1547) was fought within the territories of the Holy Roman Empire between the allied forces of Charles V, Holy Roman Emperor and Maurice, Duke of Saxony against the Lutheran Schmalkaldic League, with the forces directly loyal to Charles fighting under the command of Fernando Álvarez de Toledo, 3rd Duke of Alba.

== Background ==
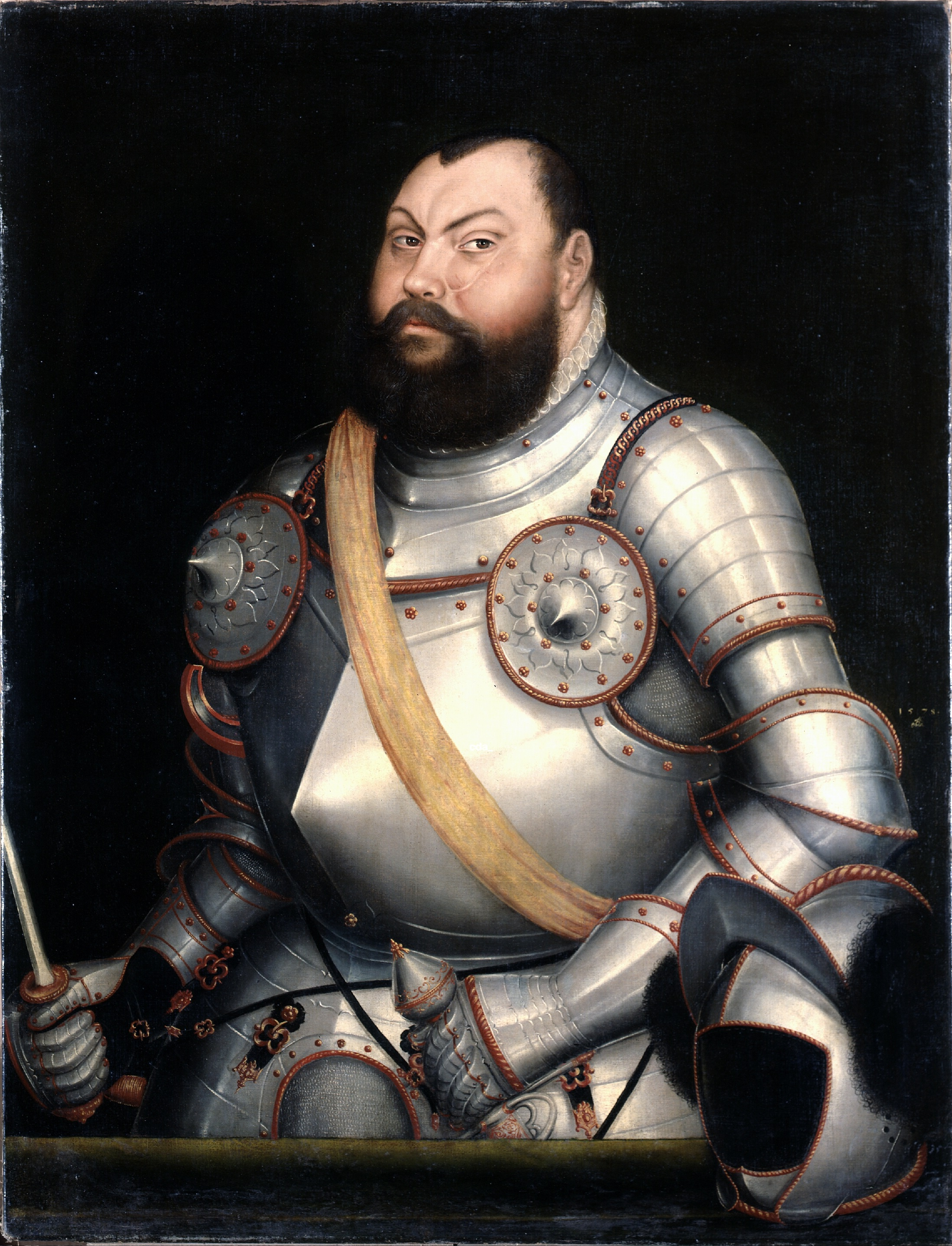
John Frederick I of Saxony by Lucas Cranach the Younger

In the course of the Lutheran Reformation numerous Imperial States had adopted the new confession, against the opposition of the ruling Catholic House of Habsburg, who recognised these conversions as a quest for increasing autonomy to the detriment of the central Imperial authority.

At the 1521 Diet of Worms Emperor Charles V had Martin Luther subjected to an Imperial ban and the dissemination of his writings prohibited. The edicts of the Diet condemned Luther and officially banned citizens of the Holy Roman Empire from defending or propagating his ideas, subjecting advocates of Lutheranism to forfeiture of all property, half of the seized property to be forfeit to the imperial government and the remaining half forfeit to the party who brought the accusation. While it was understood that Luther was to be eventually arrested and punished, enforcement of this was suspended on account of the strength of his current popular appeal. After the Diets of Nuremberg failed to accomplish the goal of arresting Luther, the Diet of Speyer (1526) reversed course and temporarily suspended the Edict of Worms. This diet was condemned at the Diet of Speyer (1529), provoking the Protestation at Speyer and giving rise to the term "Protestant." This led to the presentation of the Lutheran Augsburg Confession and Catholic Confutatio Augustana at the 1530 Diet of Augsburg. In response to the Confutatio, Philipp Melanchthon prepared the Prima delineatio. Although this was rejected by the Emperor, Melanchthon improved it as a private document until it was signed at a meeting of the Schmalkaldic League as the 1537 Apology of the Augsburg Confession, but the Catholic side did not respond to it until the 1545–63 Council of Trent.

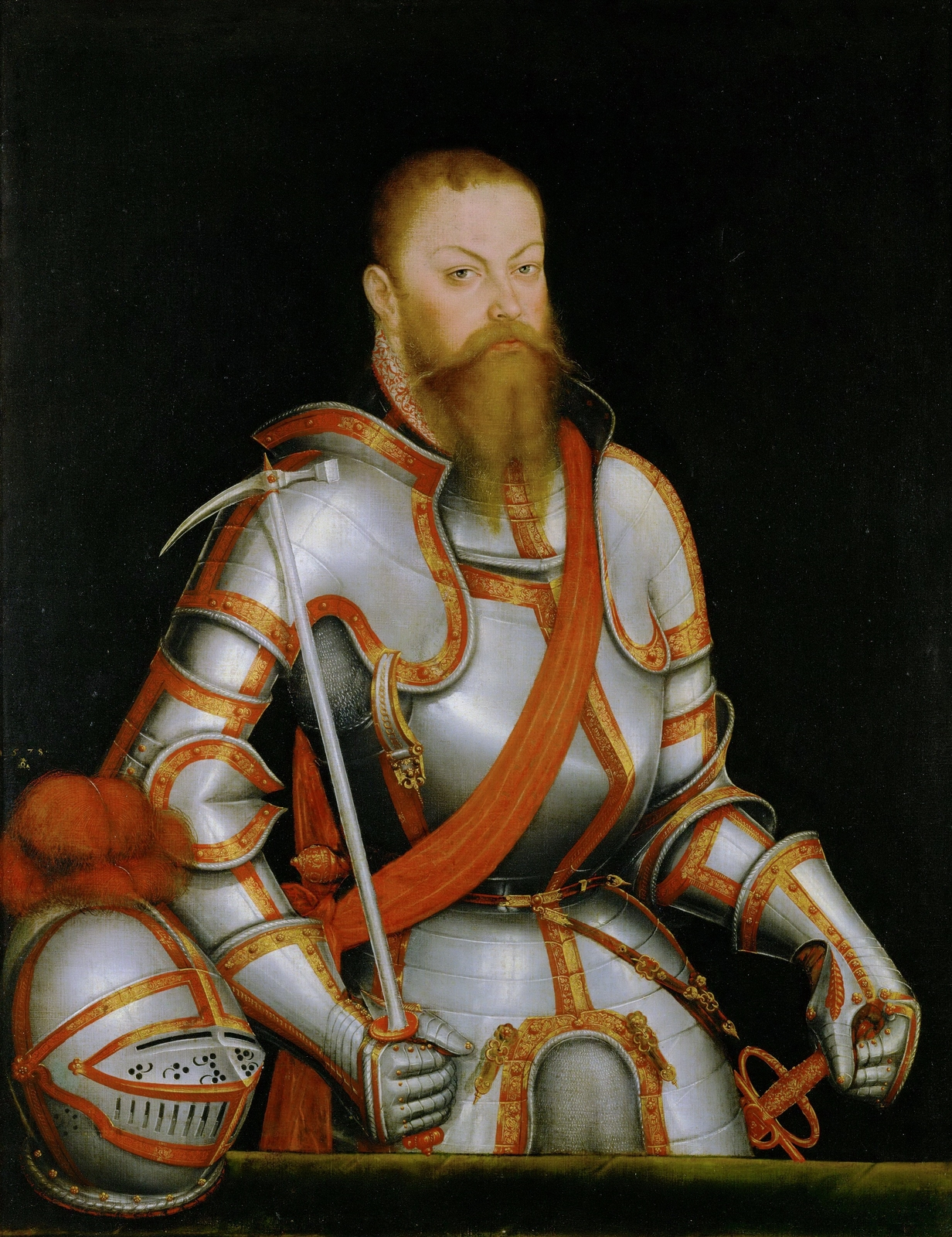
Maurice of Saxony by Lucas Cranach the Younger

In turn several Lutheran states led by Elector John Frederick I of Saxony and Landgrave Philip I of Hesse met at the town of Schmalkalden, where they established the Schmalkaldic League in 1531. At first, the Nuremberg Religious Peace of 1532 granted religious liberty to members of the Schmalkaldic League. But in 1544 Charles V returned to Germany from the Italian War after he had signed the Treaty of Crépy and began to forge alliances not only with Pope Paul III but also with Lutheran princes, foremost with Duke Maurice of Saxony, the Albertine cousin of Saxon Elector John Frederick I. In view of the Emperor's preparations for battle, the Schmalkaldic leaders on 4 July 1546 gathered at Ichtershausen. Here they negotiated how the league should deal with the approaching conflict with the Emperor. Both John Frederick and Philip of Hesse agreed quickly that the Emperor had larger financial resources and thus could set up a larger army. However, they also noticed that they were positioned to mobilize their troops faster than the emperor because Charles V had not yet concentrated a significant amount of mercenaries. As a result, they decided to wage a preventive war. Since Martin Luther had died in February 1546, this eliminated a major obstacle to their decision. Luther had repeatedly argued against the legality and morality of a war between the Empire and the Schmalkaldic League. To Luther, only a beerwolf type ruler could be legitimately resisted by his own subjects.

The Emperor gathered an army of around 52,000 men (20,000 Germans, 12,000 Italians, 10,000 Spaniards, and 10,000 men from the Netherlands) for his campaign, that was to start on the Danube.

== Conflict ==
The war broke out in Swabia when a united army of several Lutheran Imperial cities occupied the Catholic town of Füssen, a possession of the Augsburg prince-bishops, and made the Imperial forces move toward the fortress of Ingolstadt in the Bavarian duchy. However, plans to invade Austrian Tyrol in order to bar the Emperor from bringing up Italian troops did not meet the approval of the Schmalkaldic princes. Both Duke William IV of Bavaria and the Austrian Archduke Ferdinand I of Habsburg declared themselves neutral in the conflict, allowing Charles V to concentrate a mighty Imperial army without disturbances.

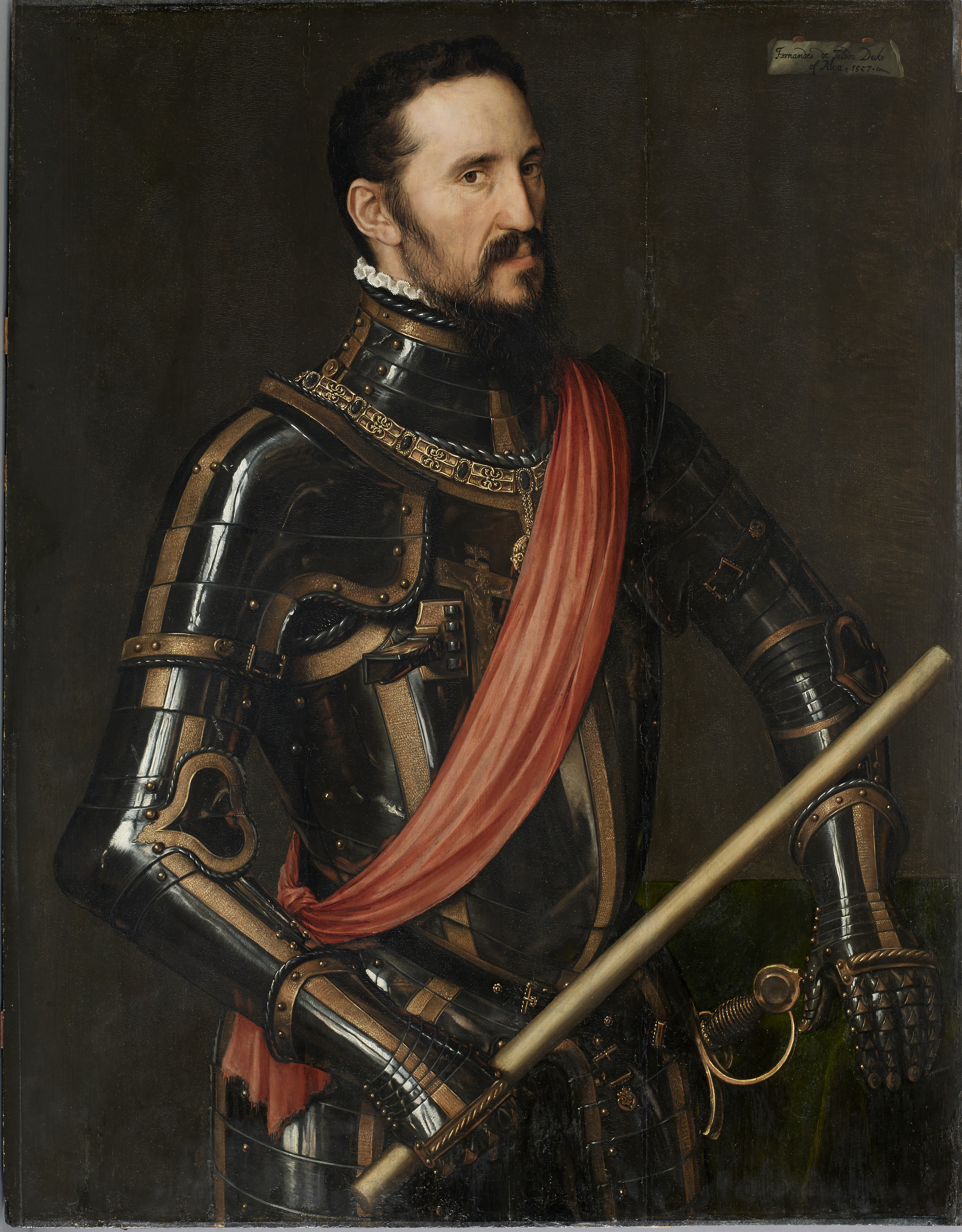
Don Fernando Álvarez de Toledo, Duke of Alba, commander of the Imperial-Spanish forces in Germany, by Antonis Mor

Furthermore, the Schmalkaldic leaders could not resolve upon delivering a battle against the entrenched Imperial troops. On 20 July 1546 Elector John Frederick I and Landgrave Philip I were placed under the Imperial ban, under the pretext that they had deposed the Catholic Duke Henry V of Brunswick-Wolfenbüttel in 1542. Duke Maurice of Saxony took the chance and in October with the aid of Ferdinand I of Habsburg, King of Bohemia, invaded the lands of his rival and cousin in Ernestine Saxony, forcing Elector John Frederick I to turn his troops around. He quickly came on from Swabia and liberated Ernestine Saxony with his army, whereafter he in turn invaded Albertine Saxony and the adjacent Bohemian lands. The onset of winter left the armed conflict inconclusive.

In Swabia the Hessian troops took no further action, while the forsaken Imperial cities like the Lutheran princes Duke Ulrich of Württemberg and Count Palatine Frederick II chose to submit to the Emperor. On 28 March 1547 Charles V set off for Bohemia, where he united forces with his brother King Ferdinand I of Bohemia. Because the Bohemian Lutherans did not provide any military assistance to Elector John Frederick I, as he had hoped for, the Spanish-Imperial forces of Charles V forced him into retreat. Due to disagreement in strategy, the League's defenses were finally routed on 24 April 1547 at the Battle of Mühlberg, where John Frederick I was taken prisoner.

After the battle, which determined the result of the war, only two cities continued to resist: Bremen and Magdeburg. Both cities refused to pay the fines Charles imposed on them and avoided occupation by Imperial troops. In the case of Bremen, 12,000 imperial soldiers under the command of Duke Eric II of Brunswick-Calenberg unsuccessfully laid siege from January until May. This event led to the Battle of Drakenburg on 23 May 1547, as a Protestant army of the Schmalkaldic League was plundering the nearby Principality of Calenberg. His men and supplies exhausted, Duke Eric II and his Imperial forces went to confront the army and were quickly defeated. During the fighting, Eric was forced to swim over the Weser river in order to save his own life. As a consequence of the Battle of Drakenburg, the Imperial troops left northern Germany.

== Aftermath ==
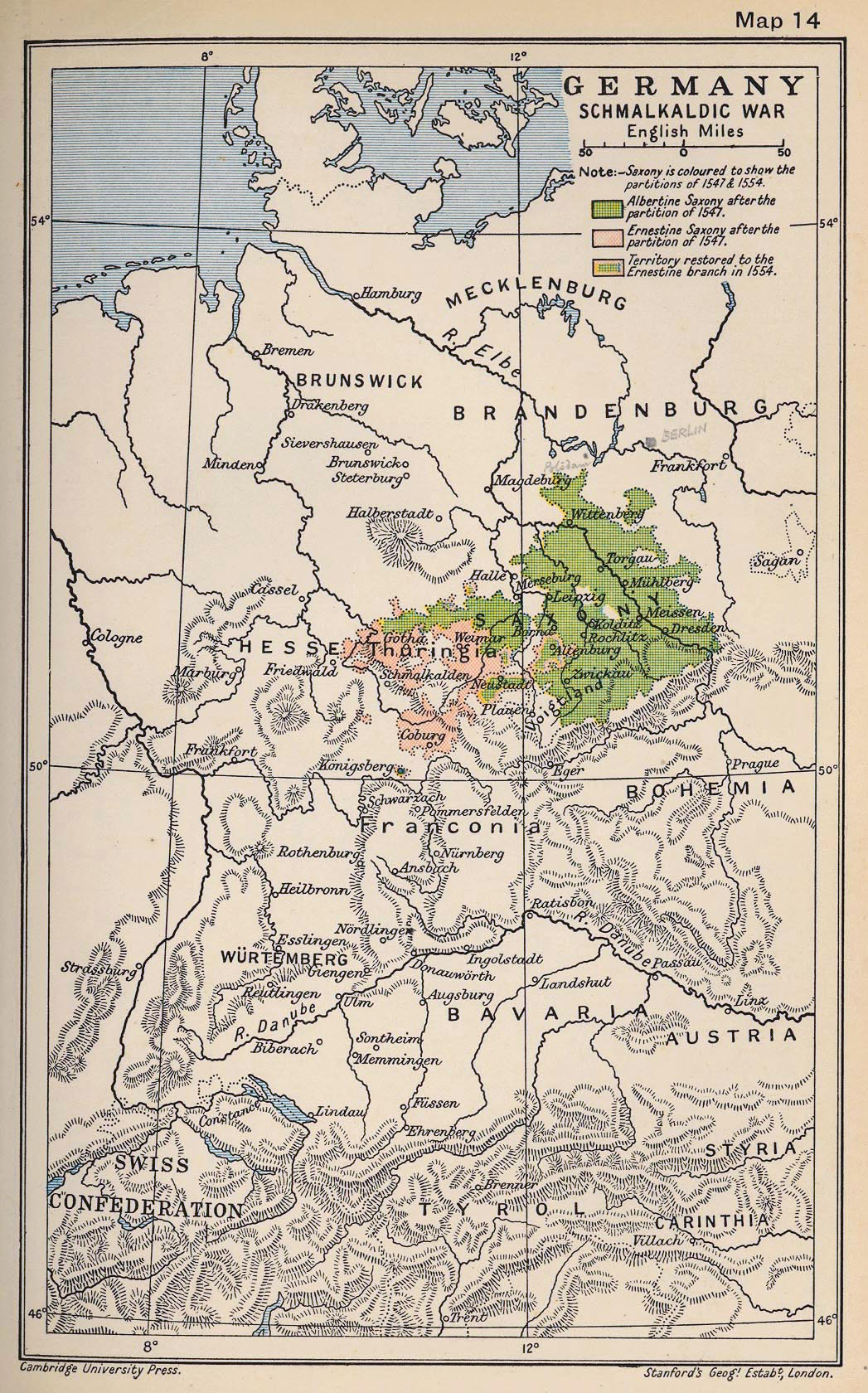
Ernestine (pink) and Albertine (green) Saxony after the Schmalkaldic War.

The captured Elector John Frederick I at first was sentenced to death, and, in order to obtain pardon, on 19 May 1547 signed the Capitulation of Wittenberg. He lost the electoral dignity and some minor Ernestine territories to his cousin Maurice, who was declared the new Saxon Elector on 4 June. Maurice with the aid of Elector Joachim II Hector of Brandenburg tried to mediate in favour of his father-in-law Philip I of Hesse. The Landgrave delivered himself up in Halle, where he threw himself on the mercy of the Emperor. Charles V nevertheless had him immediately imprisoned, leaving the Electors disturbed by this show of haughtiness.

Although the Imperial forces were victorious over the Schmalkaldic League, crushing them, the ideas of Luther had by this time so overspread Europe they could not be contained by military force. However, on 15 May 1548 Charles V, feeling at the height of his power, dictated the Augsburg Interim to prepare the reintegration of the Protestants into the Catholic Church. The edict provoked another revolt by the Protestant princes in 1552, known as the Second Schmalkaldic War. This time the Protestant princes were led by Elector Maurice of Saxony and backed by King Henry II of France. Charles V had to flee from the superior Lutheran forces and to cancel the Interim with the Peace of Passau, whereby John Frederick I of Saxony and Philip I of Hesse were released. An official settlement acknowledging the Protestant religion arrived three years later in the form of the Peace of Augsburg. The next year Charles V voluntarily abdicated in favour of his brother Ferdinand I.

== See also ==
- Thirty Years' War
- Confessionalization
- Battle of Mühlberg
- Capitulation of Wittenberg
