= St. Anne's Church, Augsburg =

Medieval church in Germany

Coordinates: 48°22′04″N 10°53′43″E

St Anne's Church
- St. Anna-Kirche
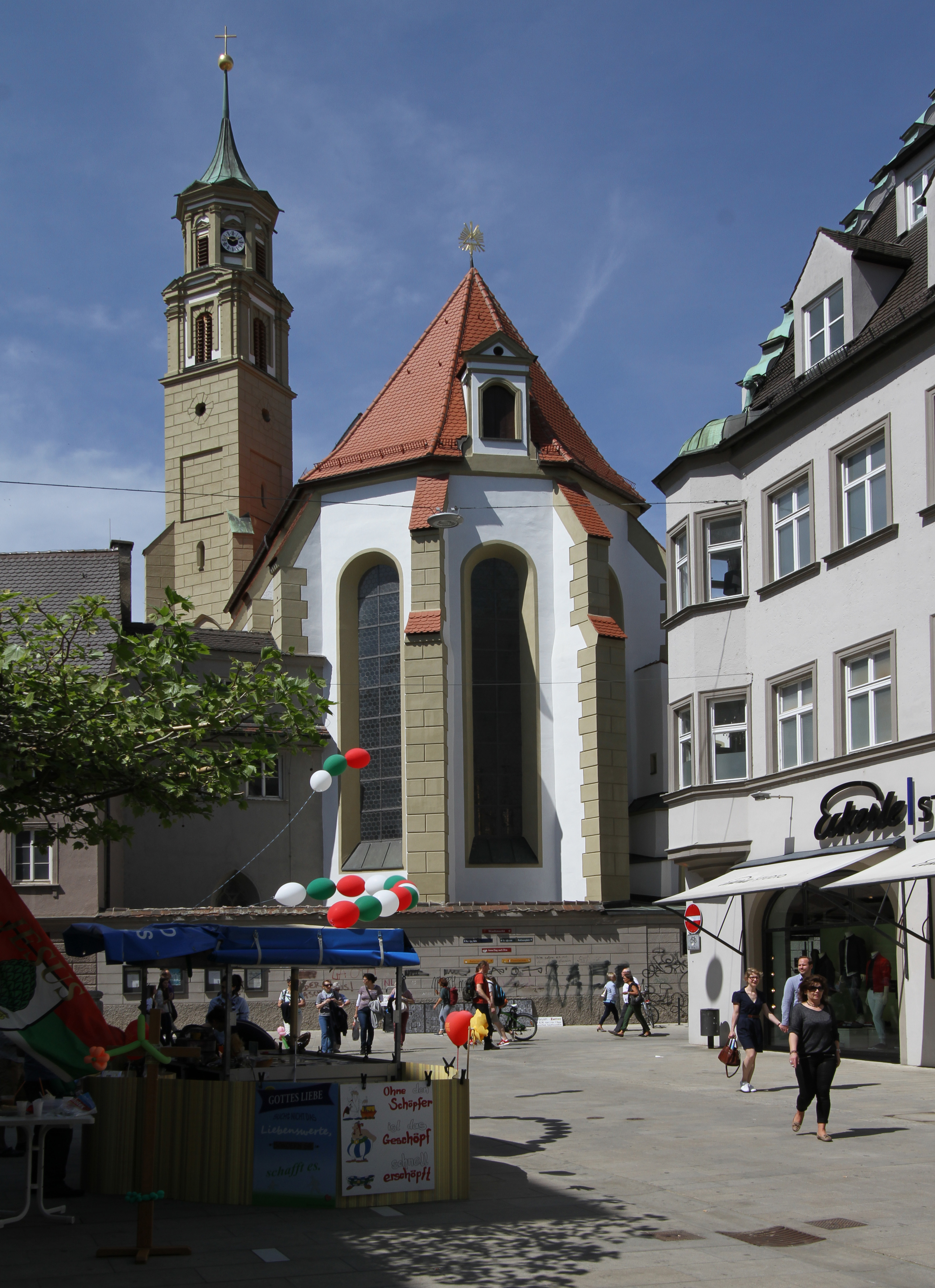
- St Anne's Church
- Location: Augsburg, Bavaria, Germany
- Denomination: Lutheran, Roman Catholic (Fugger Chapel)
- Previous denomination: Roman Catholic

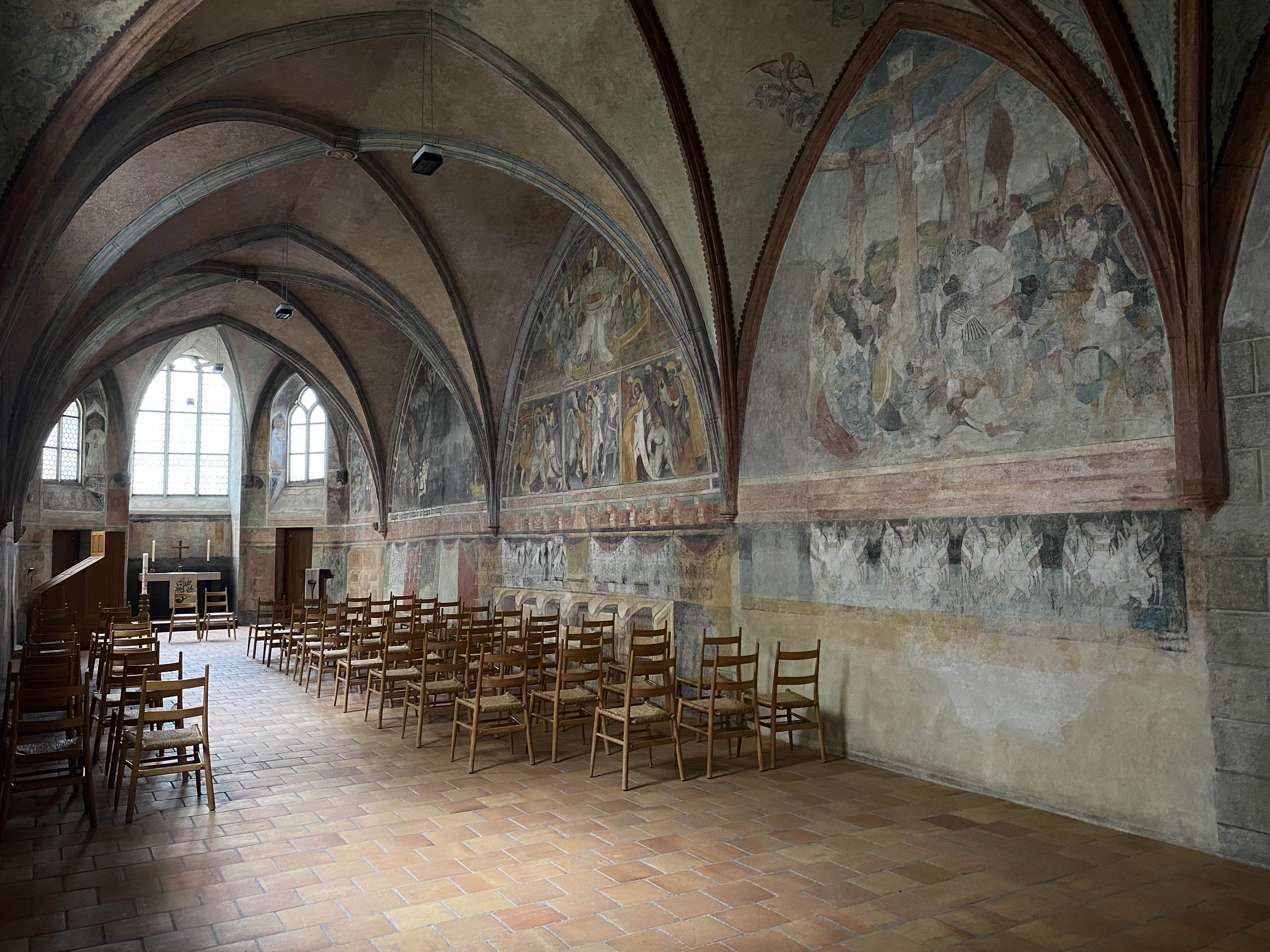
The frescoed Goldsmith's Chapel

The Church of St. Anne (German: St. Anna-Kirche) is a medieval Evangelical Lutheran parish church in Augsburg, Germany. Originally built in 1321, it has undergone several significant renovations since, and is notable for its elaborate interior decoration, and its role in Protestant-Catholic relations in Germany.

The choir of the church, a memorial chapel dedicated to the Fugger family, dates to the early 16th century, and is one of the earliest examples of Renaissance architecture north of the alps. Despite the church becoming Protestant in 1548, the Fugger Chapel has remained Catholic since its construction.

== History ==
St. Anne's Church was originally erected as the church of the Carmelite Priory of Augsburg by in 1321. The structural core of the church and its adjacent monastery buildings dates to this time. In 1420, the Goldsmith's chapel, a richly decorated gothic addition, was built by Afra Hirn in memory of her husband, the head of an eminent Augsburg merchant's family. In 1496, it became the chapel of the Goldsmith's Guild. The Fugger family, who lived nearby, began construction on a memorial chapel dedicated to the family in 1518. In the same year, Martin Luther stayed there with the Carmelite friars when he was in Augsburg to meet the papal legate, Cardinal Cajetan, who wanted Luther to submit to the pope. When he refused to recant, Luther fled Augsburg at night with the help of the Carmelite friar and mayor's son Christoph Langenmantel vom Sparren to avoid being arrested by imperial soldiers. After the community's Prior, Johannes Frosch, renounced his orders and married in 1525, the church became one of Augsburg's first sites of Protestant worship.

The Gymnasium bei St. Anna was founded in the abandoned priory buildings in 1531, and the priory was officially dissolved in 1534. The nave and aisles of the church were given a baroque renovation in the 17th century, showcasing decoration by Franz Xaver Feuchtmayer, his son, and Johann Georg Bergmüller. The church was heavily damaged during World War II. On October 31, 1999, representatives of the Catholic and Evangelical Lutheran churches signed the Joint Declaration on the Doctrine of Justification in the Church of St. Anna. This is considered one of the most important events for the ecumenical movement. After a long period of closure, the Lutherstiege museum was reopened in 2012. A comprehensive renovation was completed in 2016/17.

== The building ==
The church is situated on Martin Luther Square, known before 1933 as the Annahof.

The main body of the church consists of three aisles, and is attached to the Goldsmith's Chapel and the old cloister and adjacent rooms of the Carmelite priory to its north and south, respectively.

The Goldsmiths' Chapel (Goldschmiedekapelle) was donated in 1420 by Afra Hirn in memory of her husband, Conrad, who is buried at Augsburg Cathedral. It contains a collection of representative gothic frescos depicting a passion cycle and the Last Judgement, among other religious themes. Its frescos were renovated in the 19th century.

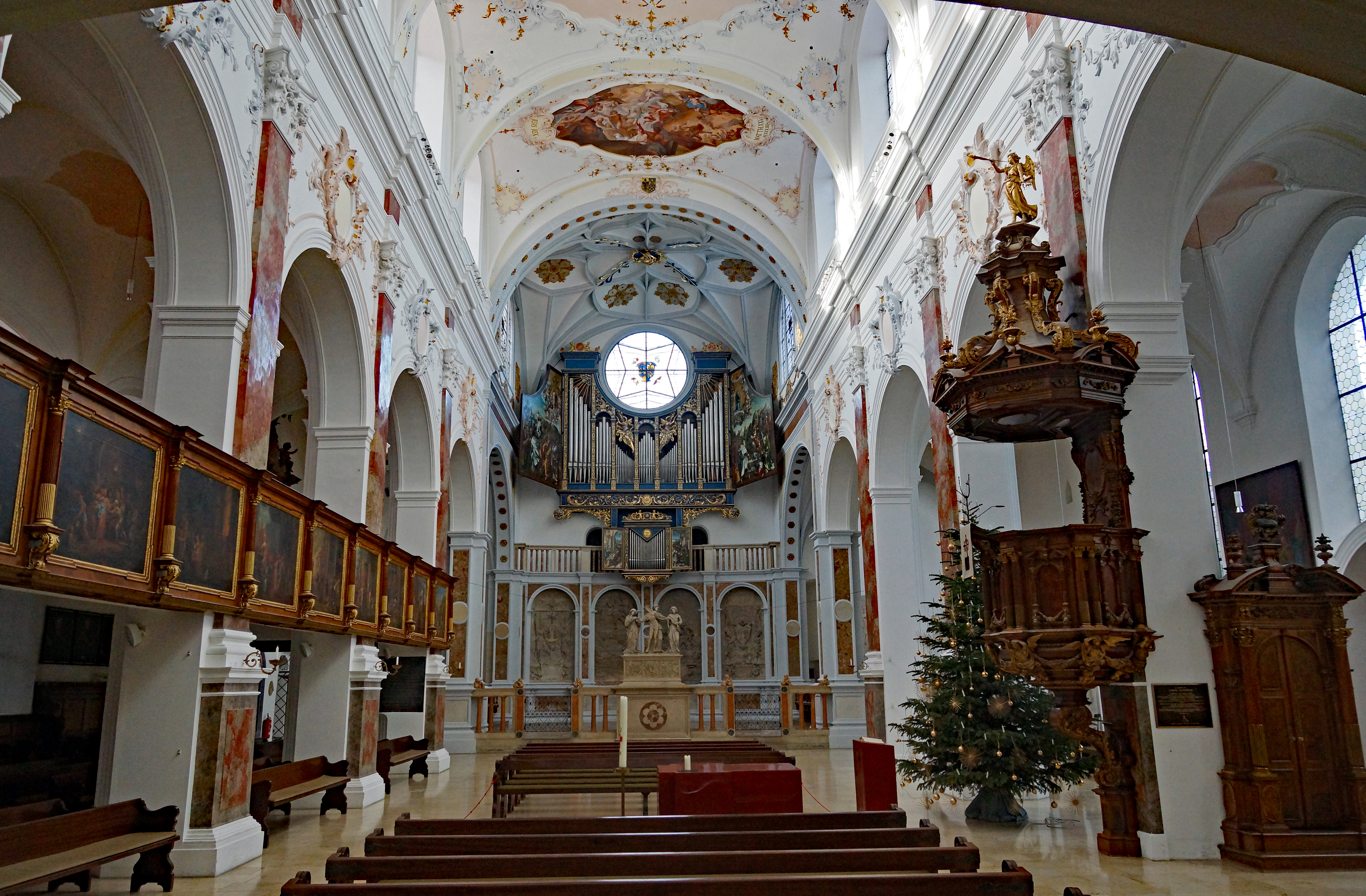
The nave seen from under the choir gallery. The Fugger Chapel, at the west end of the church, is separated from the church by a marble balustrade decorated with putti.

Together with his brother Ulrich Fugger the Elder and on behalf of his deceased brother Georg Fugger, Jakob Fugger founded the Fugger chapel in the choir of the church in front of the high altar. It became the burial place of the three brothers and their two nephews Raymund Fugger and Hieronymus Fugger (1499–1538). The Fugger chapel is the earliest example of Renaissance architecture in Germany. Among the features are a marble pavement, an organ with painted shutters, stained glass, choir stalls, a sculptural group of the Lamentation of Christ, and memorial relief tablets in the style of Dürer. The spire was added in 1607 by Elias Holl. The church ceiling is decorated with Baroque and Rococo stuccowork, with frescoes by Johann Georg Bergmüller.

In 1518 the chapel was consecrated to Jesus Christ, the Holy Virgin Mary and the Evangelist Matthew. It has remained a consecrated Catholic place of worship to this day. When St. Anne's Church became Protestant in 1548, the Fugger Chapel remained Catholic because the Fugger Foundation continued to look after it and contributed to the upkeep of the church. Hence, part of the church is denominationally different from the rest, and that the burial place of the Fugger family, who are considered strictly Catholic, is now in a Protestant church. Adding to the oddity is that Jacob Fugger's loans to Cardinal Albert of Brandenburg and the indulgence to repay them were what triggered Martin Luther's Reformation.

== Sources ==
- St. Anna (Augsburg) on German Wikipedia
- St. Anne's church
- Geschichte der St. Anna-Kirche in Augsburg By Julius Hans
- Stammbaum der Familie Lotter in Schwaben By Carl Lotter
