= Gregor Brück =

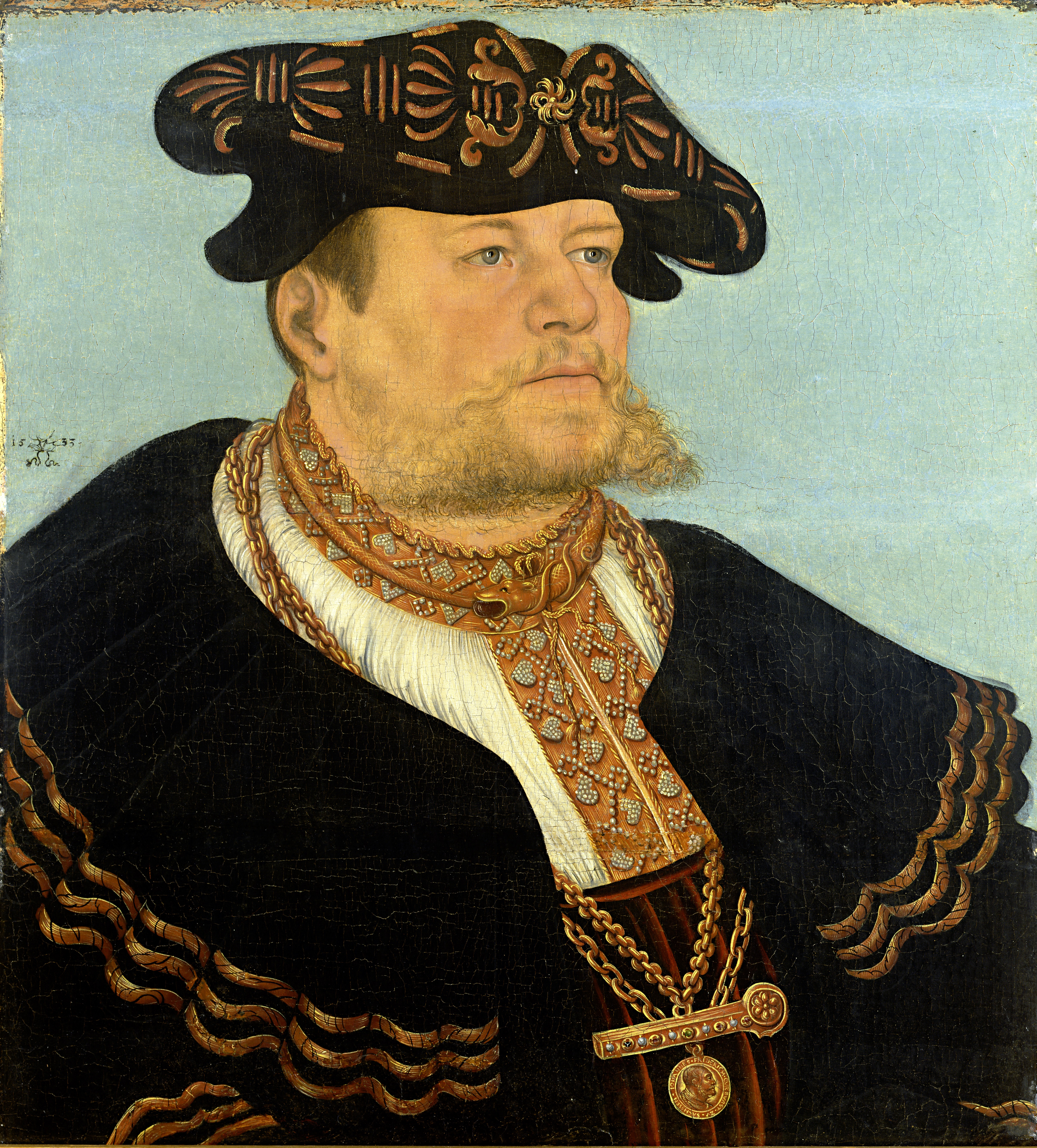
Gregor Brück by Lucas Cranach the Elder

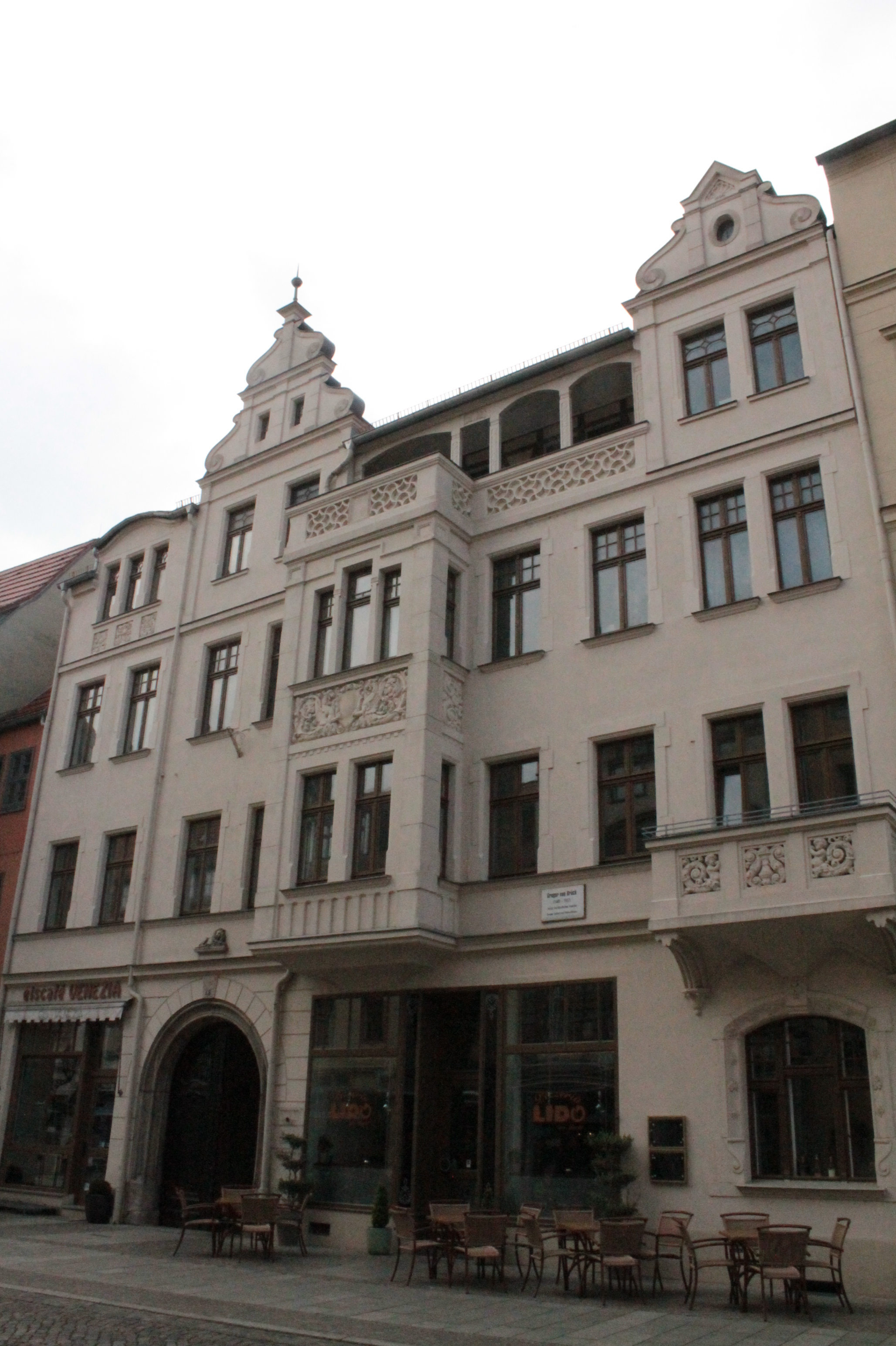
The site of Gregor Bruck's house, Marktplatz, Wittenberg

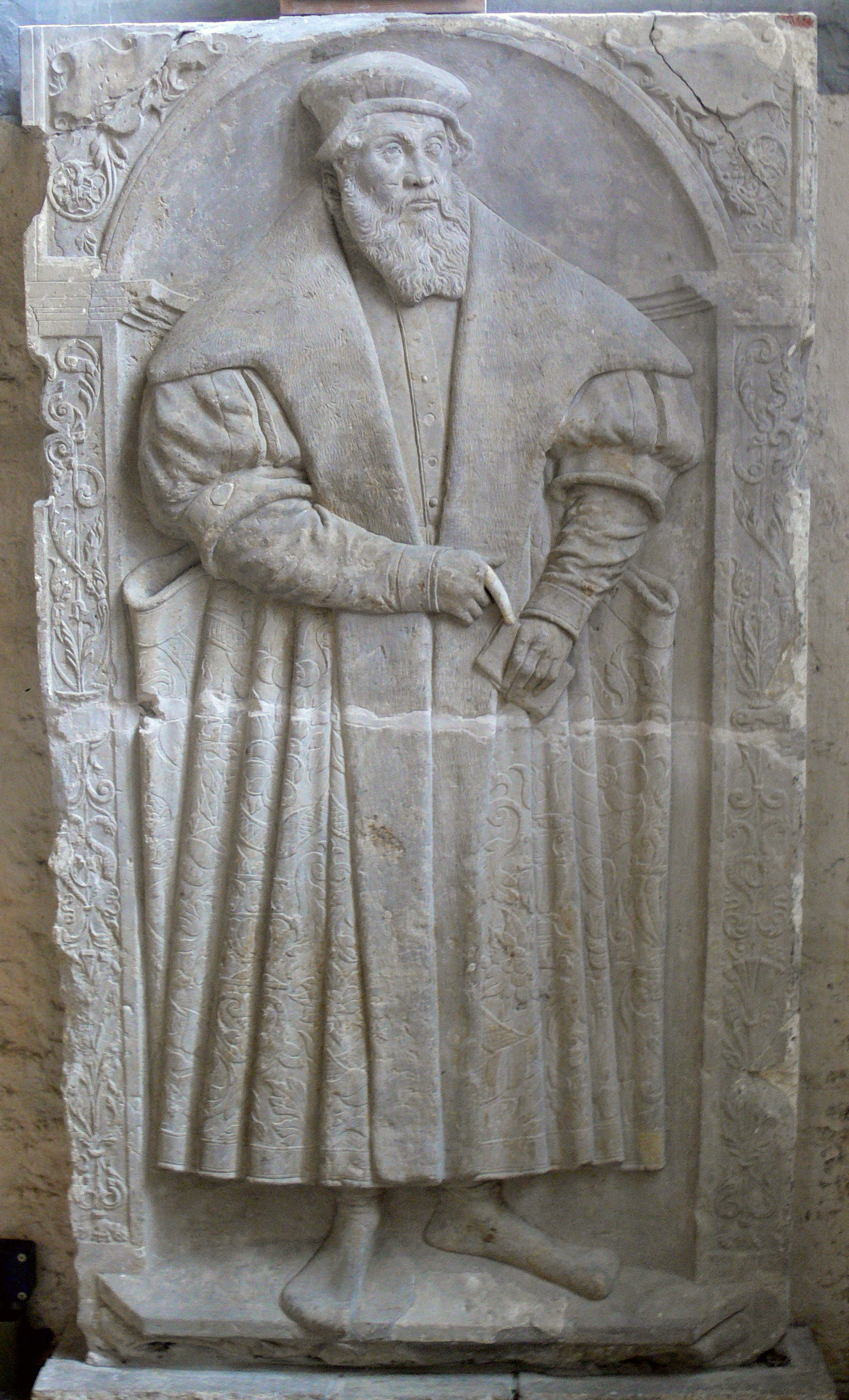
The grave of Gregor Brück in Jena Stadtkirche

Gregor Brück (1485–1557) was a 16th-century figure of the Reformation, and Saxon Chancellor. He is also known by his latinised name Gregorius Pontanus. His role in the early 16th century in Germany, as legal advisor to Martin Luther, may be said to earn him the title of Lawyer of the Reformation. Although now much forgotten or unknown, his contribution to European history was almost certainly world-changing.

== Life ==
He was born Gregor Henisch or Heinz, the son of Georgius Heinz, the mayor of Brück in Brandenburg. His older brother was Simon Heinz.

In the autumn of 1502 he enrolled in the University of Wittenberg as "Gregorius Henrish von Brück" (meaning from the town of Brück). This "error", naming him after his birthplace, stuck with him for the rest of his life. He was awarded the degree of bachelor in December 1505. In 1506 he went to the University of Frankfurt to study law under Heironymus Schurff, and earned his doctorate in 1509. He then worked with the lawyer Henning Gode and quickly gained a strong reputation.

In 1519 he returned to Wittenberg as a town councillor at the request of Frederick the Wise. There he lived in a house on the southeast corner of the marketplace, facing the town hall. Martin Luther was a close neighbour and worked with him on drafting his arguments for the Diet of Worms, a pivotal point in the Reformation.

His neighbours to the west were Lucas Cranach the Elder and his son Lucas Cranach the Younger.

In the Wittenberg movement of October 1521, Gregor Brück was the chief negotiator between the church, the university and the town council in resolving issues within a legal framework. This movement brought about the abolition of Mass in the Wittenberg church where Luther preached. Gregor Brück also attended the Diet of Speyer in 1526 and again in 1529.

In January 1529 he resigned as councillor and was replaced by Christian Beyer. His role then changed to that of a legal advisor to the Reformation. In June 1530 he attended the Diet of Augsburg and presented the Holy Roman Emperor with the Augsburg Confession which had been written under his guidance by Martin Luther, Philip Melanchthon and Justus Jonas.

On 22 September 1530 Gregor Brück represented the Protestant faith in the formal written declaration to the established Catholic church, delivered at Wittenberg town hall. This is arguably the formal beginning of the Reformation and the start date of the Protestant church.

Later in 1531 he represented the Protestant faith at the creation of the Schmalkaldic League, an important peace treaty between the Protestants and Catholics, signed in 1532. In this role he was critical in maintaining peace and mutual acceptance between the diverging faiths in Germany. These roles appear to have been funded (and possibly conceived) by his patron Frederick the Wise and his successors. Throughout this period Gregor Brück remained legal advisor to Luther and Melanchthon.

After a major political change in Wittenberg in 1547 he lost his long-established functions. He then first went to Weimar, then to Jena in Thuringia, where he became Professor of Law at the Gymnasium, and was instrumental in raising its status to that of a university.

He died in Jena on 15 February 1557 and is buried in the Stadtkirche there.

== Family ==
In 1515 he married Anna Bule (d.1527), daughter of the Wittenberg councillor, Kilian Bule. Following her death, in 1535 he married Barbara Wollner (d.1567).

Between the two wives he had at least 11 children, all of whom took the surname Bruck. The most notable was Christian Bruck, a Saxon Chancellor who married Barbara Cranach, daughter of Lucas Cranach the Elder and sister of Lucas Cranach the Younger. Their great grandson was the poet Goethe.

His daughter Barbara Bruck married Lucas Cranach the Younger. The Cranach's were his neighbours.
