= Apology of the Augsburg Confession =

Defence of the Augsburg Confession written by Philip Melanchthon

The Apology of the Augsburg Confession (German: Apologie des Augsburger Bekenntnisses) was written by Philipp Melanchthon during and after the 1530 Diet of Augsburg as a response to the Pontifical Confutation of the Augsburg Confession, Charles V's commissioned official Roman Catholic response to the Lutheran Augsburg Confession of 25 June 1530. It was intended to be a defense of the Augsburg Confession and a refutation of the Confutation. It was signed as a confession of faith by leading Lutheran magnates and clergy at the meeting of the Smalkaldic League in February, 1537, and subsequently included in the German [1580] and Latin [1584] Book of Concord. As the longest document in the Book of Concord it offers the most detailed Lutheran response to the Roman Catholicism of that day as well as an extensive Lutheran exposition of the doctrine of Justification.

== Contents ==
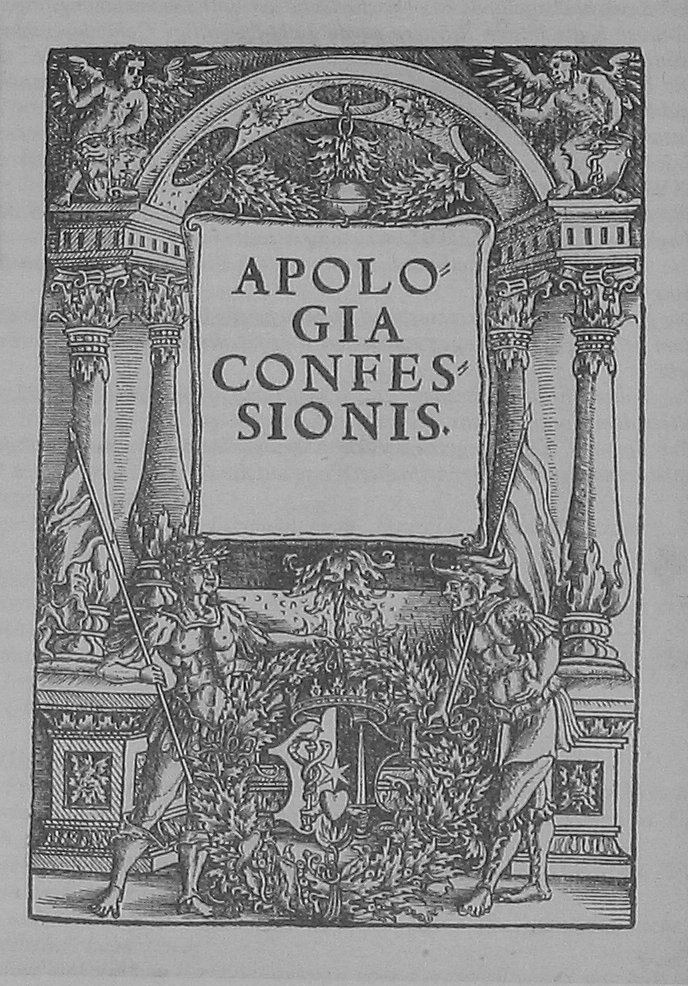

The major sections of the Apology are listed below, along with the article of the Augsburg Confession that Melanchthon is defending.

1. Concerning Original Sin—Article II
2. Concerning Justification—Article IV
3. Concerning Love and the Fulfilling of the Law
4. Concerning the Church—Articles VII and VIII
5. Concerning Repentance—Article XII
6. Concerning Confession and Satisfaction
7. Concerning the Number and Use of the Sacraments—Article XIII
8. Concerning Human Traditions in the Church—Article XV
9. Concerning the Invocation of Saints—Article XXI
10. Concerning Both Kinds in the Lord's Supper—Article XXII
11. Concerning the Marriage of Priests—Article XXIII
12. Concerning the Mass—Article XXIV
13. Concerning Monastic Vows—Article XXVII
14. Concerning Ecclesiastical Power—Article XXVIII

He also refers to some of the other articles in the Augsburg Confession which did not require an extensive defense. These articles are I, III, XVI, XVII, XVIII, XIX, XX.

== Textual issues ==
The first edition of the Apology of the Augsburg Confession was published in late April-early May 1531 in quarto format. Melanchthon continued to revise it, especially the article on justification, and issued a second edition in September 1531, which was published in octavo format. Some scholars believe the second edition is the better edition of the Apology. The Lutheran Church's formal collection of confessions in the Book of Concord refer to the first edition of the Apology when it is quoted in the Solid Declaration of the Formula of Concord. The 1580 German edition of the Book of Concord used the translation of the Apology prepared by Justus Jonas, who rendered it freely based on Melanchthon's further editing. The 1584 Latin edition of the Book of Concord uses the first edition ("editio princeps") of the Apology, following the decision made by the Lutheran estates and rulers at the Diet of Naumburg in 1560 to use only this edition.

The question of which is the "official text" of the Apology arises in connection with the English translation of the text in the 2000 "Kolb-Wengert Edition" of The Book of Concord. The translators and editors of this edition made the octavo edition the main source for their English translation because they believe it to be the "official version" of The Apology. They included English translations of variant readings of the quarto edition in italics. Other scholars question whether this text could be the actual Lutheran confession, especially since it was the quarto edition that was deliberately included in the 1584 official Latin Book of Concord to the exclusion of the octavo edition. All other English translations of The Book of Concord utilize the quarto edition.

== Bibliography ==
- Arand, Charles P. (1998). "The Texts of the Apology of the Augsburg Confession". Lutheran Quarterly. 12 (4): 461–484.
- Bente, Friedrich (1995) [1921]. Historical Introductions to the Symbolical Books of the Evangelical Lutheran Church. St. Louis: Concordia Publishing House. ISBN 0-570-03262-8.
- Bente, Friedrich (1921). "Historical Introductions to the Symbolical Books of the Evangelical Lutheran Church - VI. The Apology of the Augsburg Confession.". Triglot Concordia: The Symbolical Books of the Ev. Lutheran Church, German-Latin-English. St. Louis: Concordia Publishing House. pp. 37–47. Archived from the original on October 22, 2020.
- Concordia Triglotta: Die symbolischen Bücher der evanglish-lutherischen Kirche. St. Louis: Concordia Publishing House. 1921. This book contains the first edition (the Quarto edition) and translates it from the Latin 1584 Book of Concord, putting in brackets the translation of material found in the Jonas German translation.
- Corpus Reformatorum (in Latin). Vol. XXVII. Braunschweig: C.A. Schwetschke. 1859. pp. 419ff. Contains the best text of the quarto Latin Apology of May 1531, with variants from the 2nd, 3rd, and 4th editions in the footnotes.
- "Die Apologie der Augsburgischen Konfession". Die Bekenntnisschriften der evangelisch-lutherischen Kirche (in German) (12th ed.). Göttingen: Vandenhoeck & Ruprecht. 1998. pp. xxii–xxiii.
- Die Bekenntnisschriften Der Evangelisch-lutherischen Kirche. Herausgegeben Im Gedenkjahr Der Augsburgischen Konfession 1930 (in German). Vandenhoeck & Ruprecht. 1998. ISBN 3525521014. The Bekenntnisschriften is the critical edition of the Lutheran Confessions, offering the latest academic opinions of the various textual forms of the Lutheran Confessions.
- Fagerberg, Holsten (1988). A New Look at the Lutheran Confessions (1529–1537). Translated by Lund, Gene. St. Louis: Concordia Publishing House. ISBN 0-570-04499-5.
- Peters, Christian (1997). Apologia Confessionis Augustanae: Untersuchungen zur Textgeschichte einer lutherischen Bekenntnisschrift (1530–1584) (in German). Stuttgart: Calwer.
- Ziegler, Roland F. (April 2002). "The New English Translation of The Book of Concord: Locking the Barn Door After..." (PDF). Concordia Theological Quarterly. 66 (2): 145–165.
