= Augsburg Confession =

1530 primary confession of faith of the Lutheran tradition

The Augsburg Confession (German: Augsburger Bekenntnis), also known as the Augustan Confession or the Augustana from its Latin title, Confessio Augustana, is the primary confession of faith of the Lutheran Church and one of the most important documents of the Protestant Reformation. A summary of the Christian faith drawn for the Diet of Augsburg, it was composed in both German and Latin and presented to the Holy Roman Emperor, Charles V, by a number of German rulers and free cities on 25 June 1530. The confession was written by Luther, Melanchthon, and two others.

Charles V had called upon the princes and free territories of the Holy Roman Empire to explain their religious convictions in an attempt to restore religious and political unity within the Empire and to rally support against the Ottoman invasion following the 16th-century Siege of Vienna. The original confession was subsequently submitted to twenty Catholic theologians, who approved nine articles, approved six with qualifications, and condemned thirteen. Their response, known as the "Papalist Confutation", was in turn answered by Melanchthon, whose response was attached to the Confession. A final authorized text was subsequently issued, producing a document that has remained of foundational importance to Lutheranism.

The Confession comprises twenty-eight articles: the first twenty-one concern the similarities and differences between Lutherans and Roman Catholics, while the final seven address abuses in the existing church. It is the fourth document contained in the Lutheran Book of Concord.

== Background ==
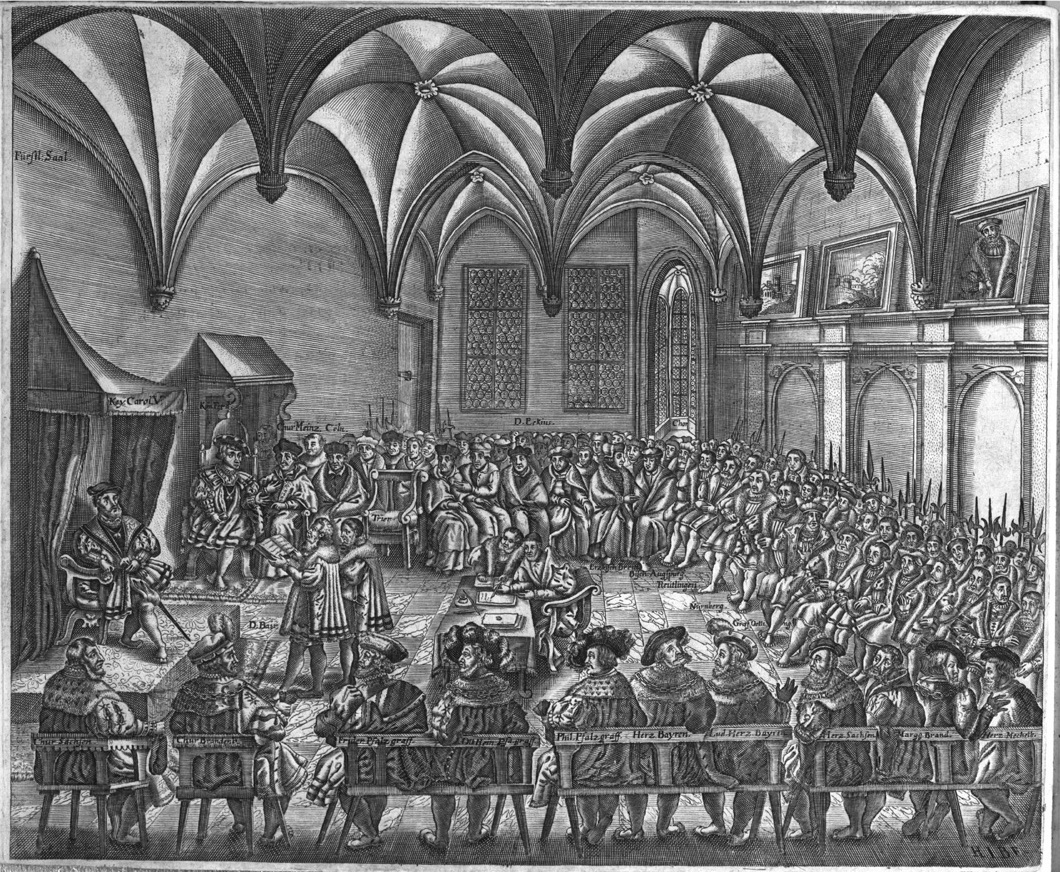
Diet of Augsburg by Christian Beyer

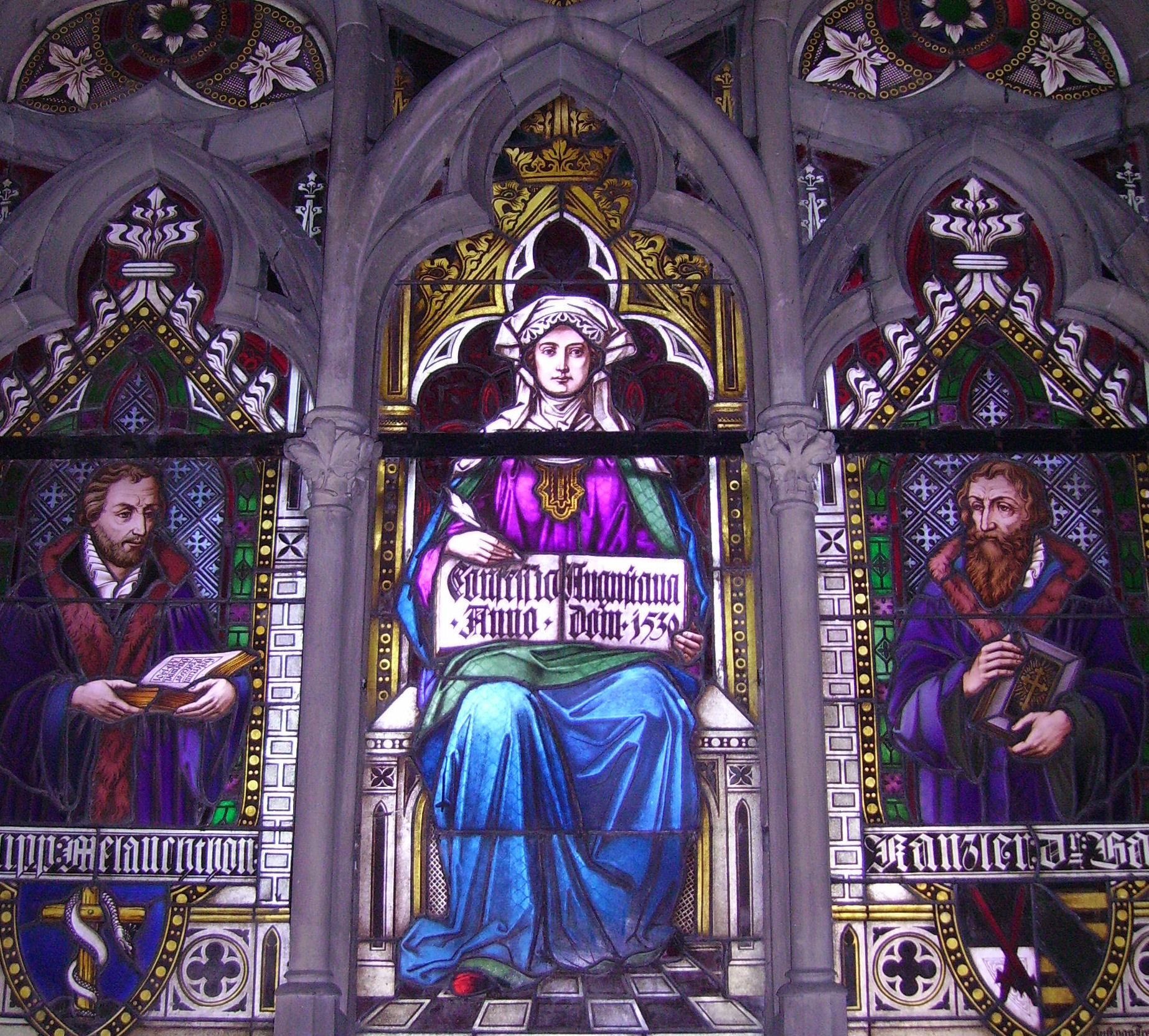

Philipp Melanchthon, Martin Luther, and Justus Jonas had already drafted a statement of their theological views in the Articles of Schwabach in 1529, when on 21 January 1530, Emperor Charles V issued letters from Bologna, inviting the Imperial Diet to meet in Augsburg on 8 April for the purpose of discussing and deciding various important questions. Although the writ of invitation was couched in very peaceful language, it was received with suspicion by some of the Protestants. Landgrave Philip of Hesse hesitated to attend the diet, but the Elector John of Saxony, who received the writ 11 March, on 14 March directed Martin Luther, Justus Jonas, Johannes Bugenhagen and Philipp Melanchthon to meet in Torgau, where he was, and present a summary of the Lutheran faith to be laid before the Holy Roman Emperor at the diet.

This summary has received the name of the "Torgau Articles". On 3 April, the elector and reformers started from Torgau, and reached Coburg on 23 April. There, Luther was left behind because he was an outlaw according to the Diet of Worms. The rest reached Augsburg on 2 May. On the journey, Melanchthon worked on a larger draft based on the Torgau articles, and sent this to Luther at Coburg on 11 May, who approved it. Several alterations were suggested to Melanchthon in his conferences with Jonas, the Saxon chancellor Christian Beyer, the conciliatory Christopher von Stadion, bishop of Augsburg, and the imperial secretary Alfonso de Valdes.

On 23 June, the final form of the text was adopted in the presence of the Elector John of Saxony, the Landgrave Philip of Hesse, the Margrave George of Brandenburg, the Dukes Ernest and Francis of Lüneburg, the representatives of Nuremberg and Reutlingen, and other counselors, besides twelve theologians. After the reading, the confession was signed by the Elector John of Saxony, Margrave George of Brandenburg, Duke Ernest of Lüneburg, the Landgrave Philip of Hesse, the Prince Wolfgang of Anhalt, the representatives of Nuremberg and Reutlingen, and probably also the electoral prince John Frederick and Duke Francis of Lüneburg.

During the diet, the cities of Weißenburg in Bayern, Heilbronn, Kempten, and Windesheim also expressed their concurrence with the confession. The emperor had ordered the confession to be presented to him at the next session, 24 June. When the Protestant princes asked that it be read in public, their petition was refused, and efforts were made to prevent the public reading of the document altogether. The Protestant princes declared that they would not part with the confession until its reading should be allowed.

The 25th was then fixed for the day of its presentation. In order to exclude the people, the little chapel of the episcopal palace was appointed in place of the spacious city hall, where the meetings of the diet were held. The two Saxon chancellors Christian Beyer and Gregor Brück, the former with the plain German copy, the other in traditional Latin language, against the wish of the emperor stepped into the middle of the assembly. The reading of the German version of the text by Christian Beyer lasted two hours and was so distinct that every word could be heard outside. The reading being over, the copies were handed to the emperor. The German copy he gave to the imperial chancellor, the Elector of Mainz. The Latin copy he took away. Neither of the copies is now extant.

The first official publication (Editio princeps) was edited by Philipp Melanchthon, a professor at the University of Wittenberg and a close colleague and friend of Martin Luther.

== Contents ==
=== The 28 articles ===
The Augsburg Confession consists of 28 articles presented by Lutheran princes and representatives of "free cities" at the Diet of Augsburg that set forward what the Lutherans believed, taught and confessed in positive (theses) and negative (antitheses) statements. The theses are 21 Chief Articles of Faith describing the normative principles of Christian faith held by the Lutherans; the antitheses are seven statements describing what they viewed as abuses of the Christian faith present in the Roman Catholic church.

==== The chief articles of faith (theses) ====
Article	Title	Description
I	God	Christians believe in the Triune God and reject other interpretations regarding the nature of God.
II	Original Sin	The nature of man is sinful, described as being without fear of God, without trust of God and with concupiscence. Sin is redeemed through Baptism and the Holy Spirit.
III	The Son of God	The incarnation, that is, the union of the fully human with the fully divine in the person of Jesus. Jesus Christ alone brings about the reconciliation of humanity with God.
IV	Justification By Faith	Man cannot be justified before God through our own abilities; we are wholly reliant on Jesus Christ for reconciliation with God. (This is often described as the one article by which the "Lutheran church stands or falls".)
V	The Office of Preaching	To ensure that the gospel of Jesus Christ is proclaimed throughout the world, Christ has established His office of the holy ministry.
VI	Of The New Obedience	Good deeds of Christians are the fruits of faith and salvation, not a price paid for them.
VII	Of The Church	There is one holy Christian church, and it is found wherever the gospel is preached in its truth and purity and the sacraments are administered according to the gospel.
VIII	What The Church Is	Despite what hypocrisy may exist in the church (and among men), the Word and the Sacraments are always valid because they are instituted by Christ, no matter what the sins may be of the one who administers them.
IX	Of Baptism	Baptism is necessary, and that through Baptism is offered the grace of God. Children are baptized as an offering to them of God's grace.
X	Of the Lord's Supper	Christ's body and blood are truly present and are distributed to communicants. They reject those that teach otherwise.
XI	Of Confession	Private absolution should remain in the church, though a believer does not need to enumerate all of his sins as it is impossible for a man to enumerate all of the sins for which he should be forgiven.
XII	Of Repentance	Repentance comes in two parts: in contrition for sins committed according to the Law and through faith offered through the Gospel. A believer can never be free from sin, nor live outside of the grace of God.
XIII	Of the Use of the Sacraments	The Sacraments (Baptism and the Eucharist) are physical manifestations of God's Word and His commitment to us. The Sacraments are never just physical elements, but have God's word and promises bound to them.
XIV	Of Ecclesiastical Order	Only those who are "properly called" may publicly preach or administer the Sacraments.
XV	Of Ecclesiastical Usages	Church holidays, calendars and festivals are useful for religious observance, but that observance and ritual is not necessary for salvation. Human traditions (such as observances, fasts, distinctions in eating meats) that are taught as a way to "merit" grace work in opposition to the Gospel.
XVI	Of Civil Affairs	Secular governments and vocations are considered to be part of God's natural orders; Christians are free to serve in government and the military and to engage in the business and vocations of the world. Laws are to be followed unless they are commandments to sin.
XVII	Of Christ's Return to Judgment	Christ will return to raise the dead and judge the world; the godly will be given everlasting joy, and the ungodly will be "tormented without end". This article rejects notions of a millennial kingdom before the resurrection of the dead.
XVIII	Of Free Will	Men have, to some extent, free will in the realm of "civil righteousness" (or "things subject to reason"), but that we do not have free will in "spiritual righteousness". In other words, we have no free choice when it comes to salvation. Faith is not the work of men, but of the Holy Spirit.
XIX	Of the Cause of Sin	Sin is caused not by God but by "the will of the wicked", turning away from God.
XX	Of Good Works	Justification by faith does not somehow condemn good works; faith causes them to do good works as a sign of our justification (or salvation), not a requirement for salvation.
XXI	Of the Worship of the Saints	Saints are kept, not as saviors or intercessors to God, but rather as examples and inspirations to our own faith and life.

==== Abuses corrected ====
Article	Title	Description
XXII	Of Both Kinds In The Sacrament (Eucharist)	It is proper to offer communicants the consecrated bread and wine, not just the bread.
XXIII	Of the Marriage of Priests	Lutherans permit their clergy to enter the institution of marriage, for the reasons that the early Church bishops were married, that God blesses marriage as an order of creation, and because marriage and procreation is the natural outlet for human sexual desire.
XXIV	Of the Mass	Lutherans retain the practice of the Mass, but only as a public gathering for the purposes of community worship and the receiving of the Eucharist. Lutherans reject the practice of using the Mass as a "work" for both salvation and worldly (monetary) gain.
XXV	Of Confession	Lutherans uphold the need for confession and absolution, but reject the notion that Confession should induce guilt or anxiety to the Christian. Absolution is offered for all sin, not just sins that can be recounted in a confession, as it is impossible for a man to know all of his transgressions.
XXVI	Of the Distinction of Meats	Human traditions that hold fasting and special observances with dietary restrictions as a means of gaining the favor of God are contrary to the gospel. While fasting and other practices are useful spiritual practices, they do not justify man nor offer salvation.
XXVII	Of Monastic Vows	Man cannot achieve purity in community or isolation from the rest of the world, and perfection cannot be attained by any vow taken or actions of man alone.
XXVIII	Of Ecclesiastical Power	The only power given to priests or bishops is the power offered through Scripture to preach, teach and administer the sacraments. The powers given to the clergy in issues of government or the military are granted and respected only through civil means; they are not civil rulers of governments and the military by divine right.

=== Conclusion ===
"That in doctrine and ceremonies nothing has been received on our part against Scripture or the Church Catholic." Signatures of several secular leaders in Saxony.

== Influence of the Augsburg Confession ==
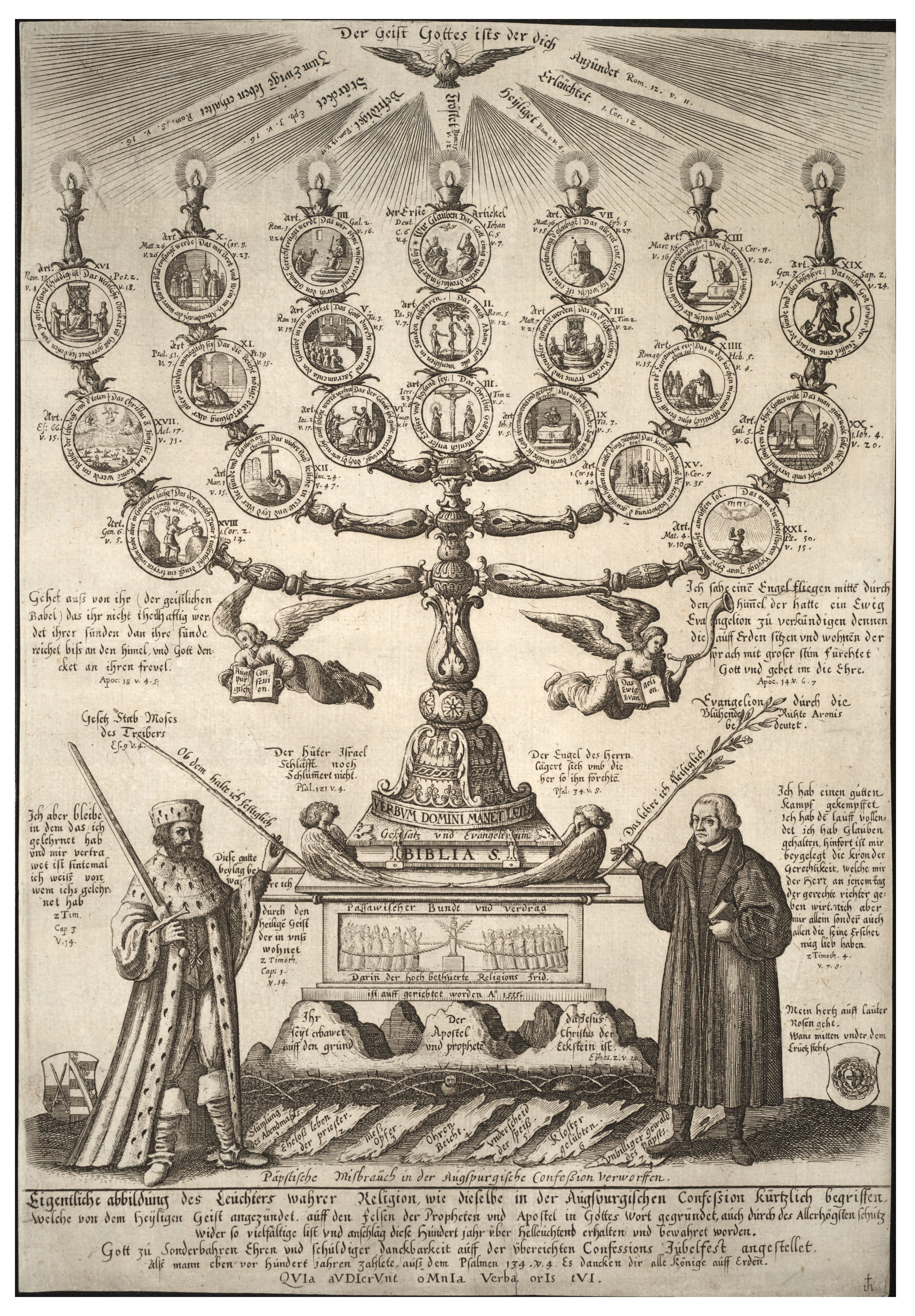
An illustration of the first 21 articles by Wenceslas Hollar

The Augsburg Confession became the primary confessional document for the Lutheran movement, even without the contribution of Martin Luther. Following the public reading of the Augsburg Confession in June 1530, the expected response by Charles V and the Vatican representatives at the Diet of Augsburg was not immediately forthcoming. Following debate between the court of Charles V and the Vatican representatives, the official response known as the Pontifical Confutation of the Augsburg Confession was produced to the Diet, though the document was so poorly prepared that the document was never published for widespread distribution, nor presented to the Lutherans at the Diet.

In September, Charles V declared the response to be sufficient and gave the Lutheran princes until 15 April 1531 to respond to the demands of the Confutation. In response, Philip Melanchthon wrote a lengthy and sustained argument both supporting the Augsburg Confession and refuting the arguments made in the Confutation. This document became known as the Apology of the Augsburg Confession and was soon translated into German and was widely distributed and read throughout Germany.

The Lutheran princes at the diet concurrently agreed to a military alliance in the event of action by Charles V known as the Schmalkaldic League. By 1535, the League admitted any city or state to the alliance that gave official assent to the Augsburg Confession and the Apology. Significantly, the Confession was translated into English in 1536, and King Henry VIII was given opportunity to sign the confession and join the league, but theological and political disputes would prevent the English church from joining.

The English translation of the Augsburg Confession and German Lutheran theologians would influence the composition of the first of the Anglican articles of faith started in the latter 1530s and culminating with the Thirty-Nine Articles in 1563. In Scandinavia the Danish-Norwegian king Christian III marched into Copenhagen on 6 August 1536 and six days later he carried out a coup that established the Reformation in Denmark and the start of the Reformation in Norway.

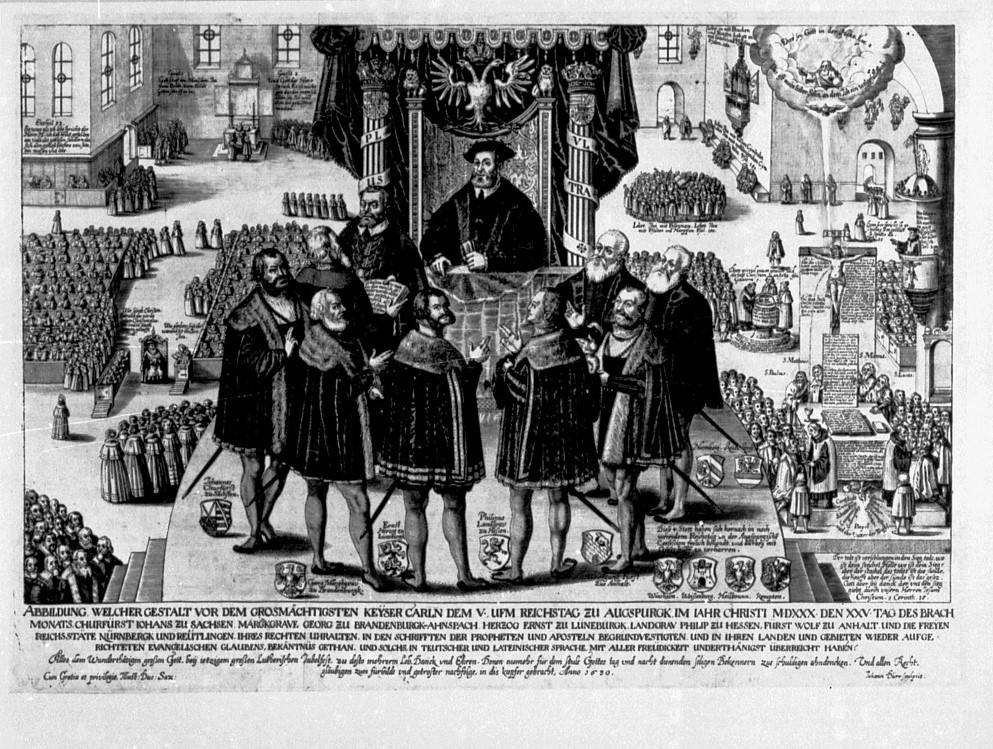
Charles V, Holy Roman Emperor receives the Augsburg Confession, Augsburg 1530.

The three bishops who dwelt in Copenhagen were arrested and the rest were tracked down and likewise arrested. The official reason was their hesitation to elect Christian as king and other alleged criminal acts. The real reason was that Christian wanted to kill two birds with one stone: carrying through a Lutheran Reformation and confiscating the bishops' properties, the profits from which was needed to cover the expenses of the recently ended civil war.

In 1540, Philipp Melanchthon produced a revised edition, the Variata, which was signed by John Calvin. Many Lutheran churches specify in their official documents that they subscribe to the "Unaltered Augsburg Confession", as opposed to the Variata.

The political tensions between the Schmalkaldic League and the forces of Charles V and the Vatican eventually led to the Schmalkaldic War in 1546–1547, which ended the 1532 Nuremberg Religious Peace and was won convincingly by Charles V. The war did not resolve the religious and political situation. Eight years later, the Lutheran princes and Charles V agreed to the Peace of Augsburg, which granted Lutheranism legal status within the Holy Roman Empire.

Theological disputes within the expanding sphere of Lutheranism to other territories in the latter half of the 16th century led to the compilation of a definitive set of Lutheran Confessions in the Book of Concord in 1580. The Book of Concord includes the Augsburg Confession and the Apology of the Augsburg Confession as the foundational confessions of the Lutheran faith.

=== Years of adoption ===
State	Year the AC was adopted
Electorate of Saxony	1530
Free City of Lübeck	1530
Württemberg	1534
Anhalt-Köthen	1534–35
Pomerania	1534–35
Bishopric of Lübeck	1535
Principality of Lippe	1538 (Note: Officially switched to a Reformed confession in 1605.)
Mark Brandenburg	1539
Mecklenburg	1549
County of Schaumburg	1559
Hessen-Kassel	1566 (Note: In name only, as Hessen-Kassel was Reformed even in 1566.)
Duchy of Brunswick-Lüneburg	1568
Oldenburg-Land	1573
Bremen	1566/1580
Verden	1566/1580
Sweden (also Finland)	1593, via the Uppsala Synod
Denmark (also in Norway and Iceland)	1665, via the Lex Regia

=== In music ===
Felix Mendelssohn's Symphony No. 5 (actually his second symphony in order of composition) was composed to celebrate the 300th anniversary of the Augsburg Confession and thus bears the title The Reformation Symphony. The symphony, however, was not commissioned for the celebrations, because of either the composer's Jewish origins or the inappropriateness of a symphony for the celebrations. Instead, Eduard Grell's work for four men's voices a capella was commissioned.

=== In ecumenical dialogue ===
Because the Augsburg Confession was written in an attempt to foster peace between Lutherans and Catholics, the two traditions have focused to it on several occasions during ecumenical dialogue. In the leadup to the Augsburg Confession’s 450th anniversary in 1980, there were even suggestions that the Catholic Church might formally accept the Augsburg Confession as a Catholic statement of faith—hopes spurred on in part by Joseph Ratzinger. These hopes never came to fruition, but discussion did lead to a joint Catholic-Lutheran commentary on the confession, as well as an anniversary statement from the Joint Roman Catholic-Lutheran Commission.

In the leadup to the Augsburg Confession’s 500th anniversary in 2030, ecumenical discussion again turned to a discussion of the document. The Lutheran World Federation and Roman Catholic Church’s International Lutheran Catholic Commission have begun a new round of dialogue focused on drafting a joint statement marking the anniversary. Likewise, the Augustana Working Group—an ecumenical discussion with representatives from the churches of the International Lutheran Council and the Catholic Church—is also exploring the “ecumenical potential” of the Augsburg Confession.

== See also ==
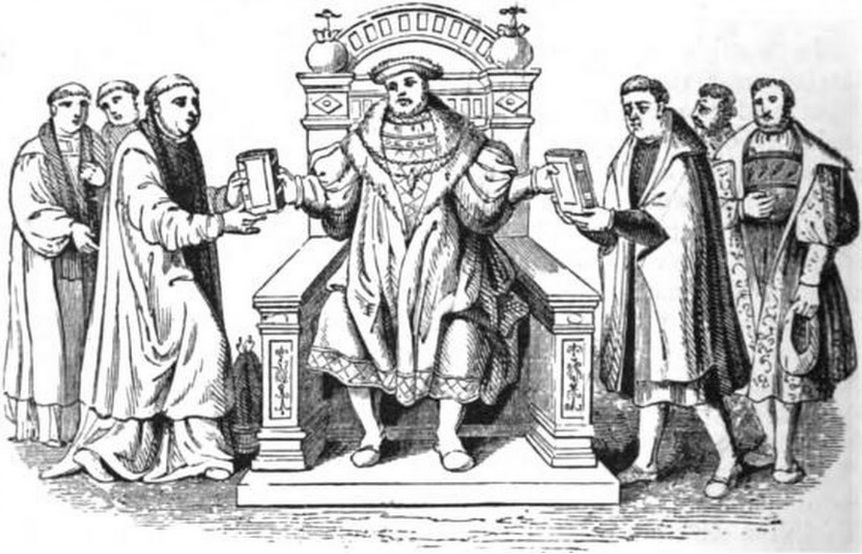
Confutatio Augustana and Confessio Augustana being presented

- Augsburg Confession Variata
- Confessio Catholica
- Confutatio Augustana
- Evangelical Church of the Augsburg Confession in Poland
