= Confutatio Augustana =

1530 refutation of the Augsburg Confession

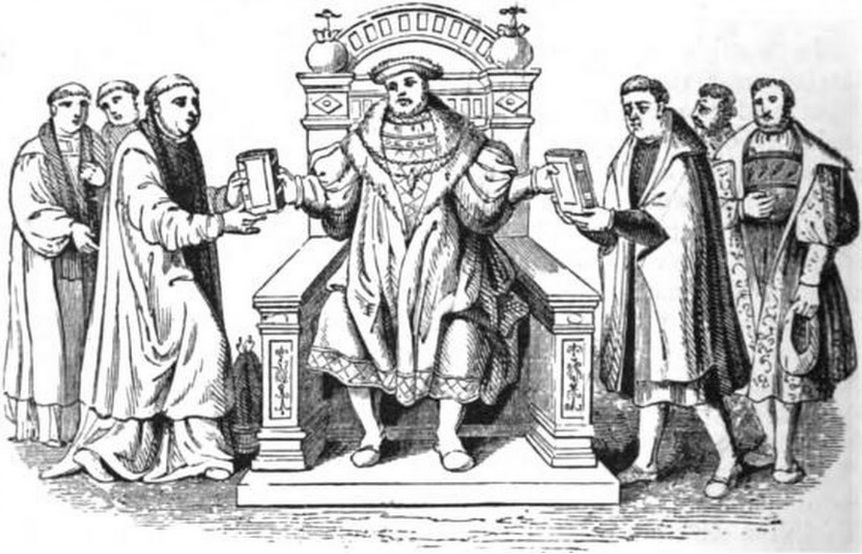
Confutatio Augustana and Confessio Augustana presented to Charles V in 1530

The Confutatio Augustana was the Roman Catholic refutation (confutatio) of the Augsburg Confession, often referred to in the theological literature as simply the Confutatio.

On 25 June 1530 the Protestant Imperial States of the realm met at the Diet of Augsburg, and presented Charles V with the Augsburg Confession, largely the work of Philip Melanchthon setting out the doctrines and practices of the church in the Protestant principalities. The emperor commissioned the papal theologians to prepare a response. An initial version of the Confutatio was rejected by the emperor, as excessively polemic and verbose. In formulating the Confutatio, the lead was taken by Johann Eck. On 3 August 1530, the final version was read at the Diet. The Confutatio rejected some of the statements of the Augsburg Confession while affirming others. It called for a return to Roman Catholic doctrine.

In other respects, however, the Confutatio found common ground with the Augsburg Confession. Emperor Charles V refused to hand over the text to the Protestants, unless they agreed not to respond, which they refused. But the Protestants had transcribed it as it was read. Melanchthon responded with the Prima delineatio, which was rejected by the Emperor. Later Melanchthon improved this document and presented it as the Apology of the Augsburg Confession, which was signed at a 1537 meeting of the Schmalkaldic League. The Roman Catholic side did not respond to this formally until the Council of Trent.

== Bibliography ==
- Heiko Oberman. The Reformation: Roots and Ramifications. Continuum International Publishing Group, 2004. ISBN 9780567082862
- Johann Ficker: Die Konfutation des Augsburgischen Bekenntnisses. Leipzig 1891
- Herbert Immenkötter Um die Einheit im Glauben. Die Unionsverhandlungen des Augsburger Reichstages. Münster 1974
- The Book of Concord: Full text of the Confutatio
