= Siege of Ingolstadt (1546) =

Failed attack on Ingolstadt, Germany

- Part of the Schmalkaldic War
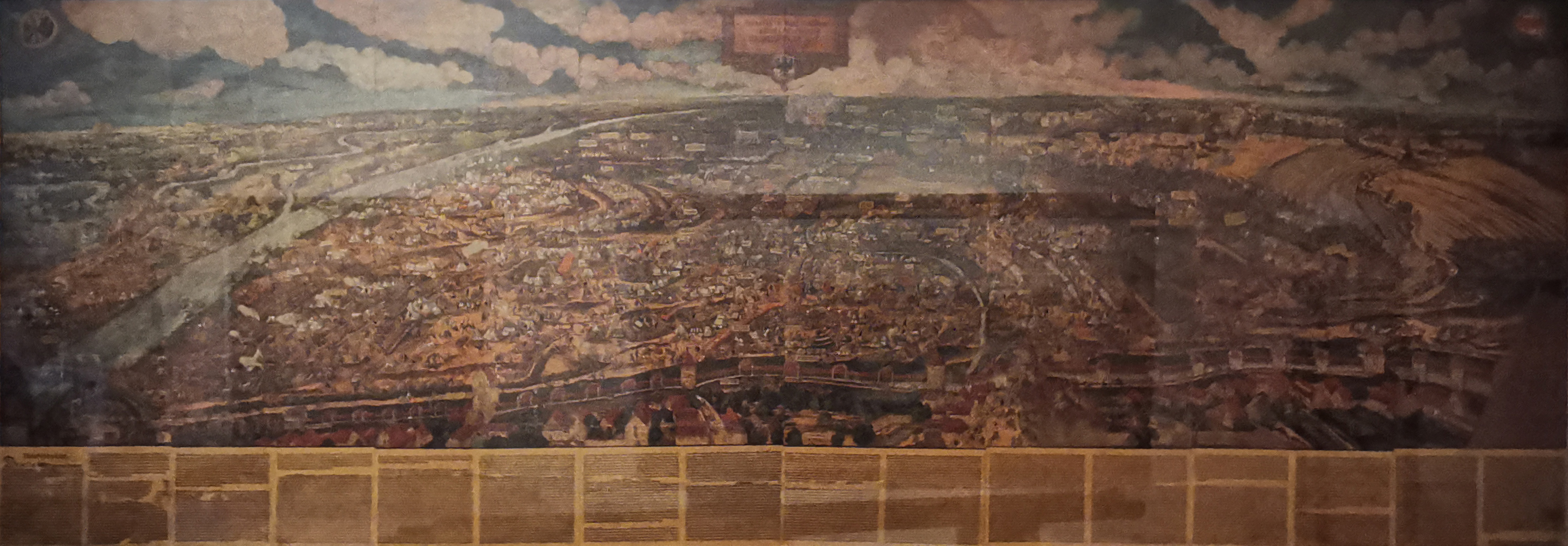
- Contemporary view of Ingolstadt with a field camp of the Danube campaign
Date	September 1546
Location	Ingolstadt
Result	Catholic victory

Belligerents
Protestant Schmalkaldic troops	Catholic Imperial army City of Ingolstadt

Strength
Unknown (numerous)	Unknown (smaller)

Casualties and losses
Unknown	Unknown (few)

The Battle of Ingolstadt (German: Schlacht bei Ingolstadt) of 1546 was a short-lived siege commitment by the Protestant forces of the Schmalkaldic League directed against the smaller imperial Catholic troops consisting of the locals from the town itself and the surrounding Bavarian countryside. It resulted in the withdrawal of the Schmalkaldeners.

== Siege ==
In 1537, Ingolstadt was expanded into the Bavarian state fortress of Ingolstadt, which it remained for 400 years, with a brief interruption. This earned the city the name "Schanz" and even today many Ingolstadt residents call themselves "Schanzer". Under Count Solms, Lord of Münzberg, a Renaissance fortress with bulwarks was built, although the medieval city wall was preserved. The construction phase lasted until around 1565. Before the work was even finished, in 1546, during the Schmalkaldic War, the troops of the Schmalkaldic League and the imperial troops of Charles V faced each other in front of the city gates for two weeks. The painter Hans Muelich made paintings of the siege from a church tower. With the withdrawal of the Schmalkaldeners, the fortress had passed its first test.
