= Christian Beyer =

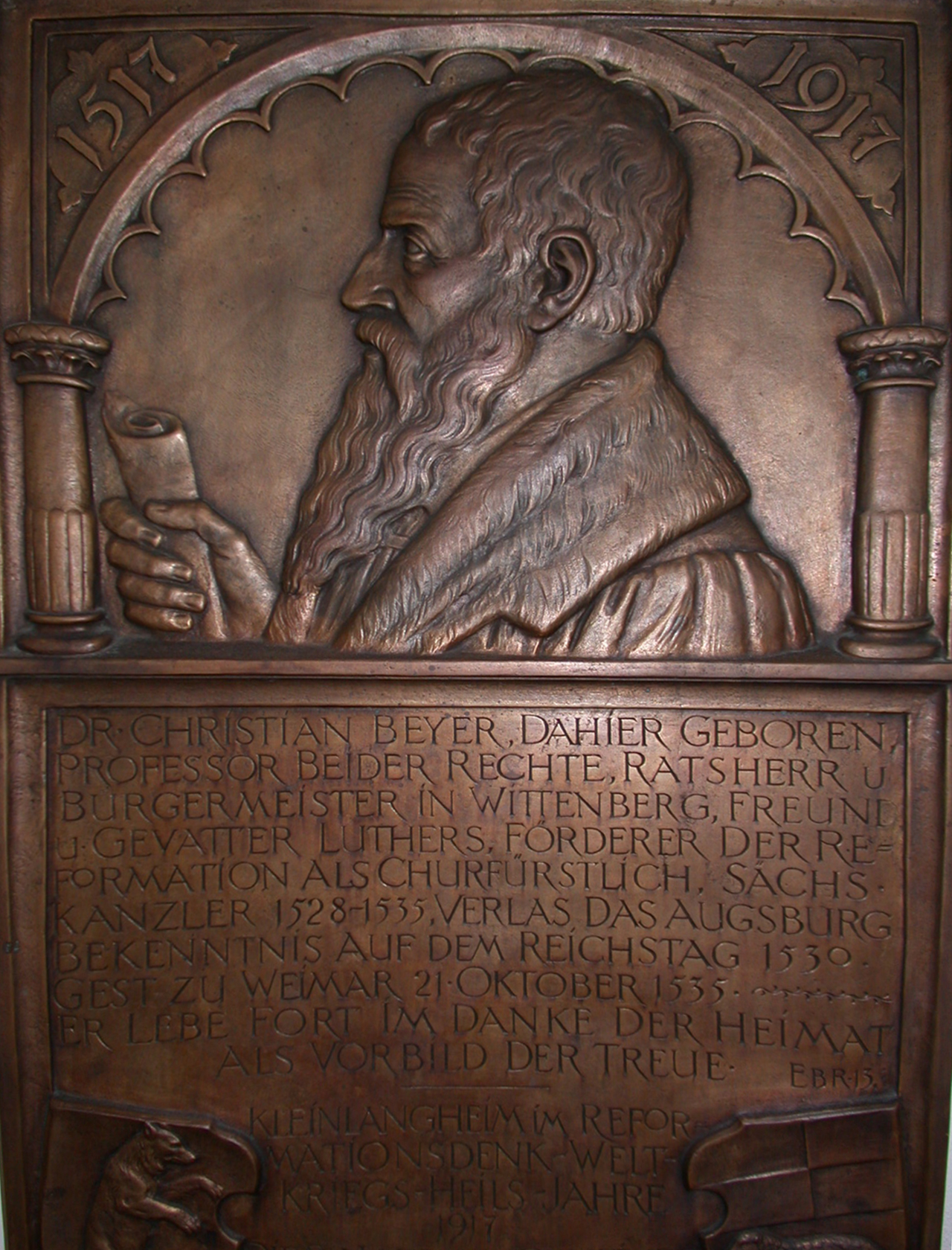
Dr. Christian Beyer epitaph in Kleinlangheim, Franconia

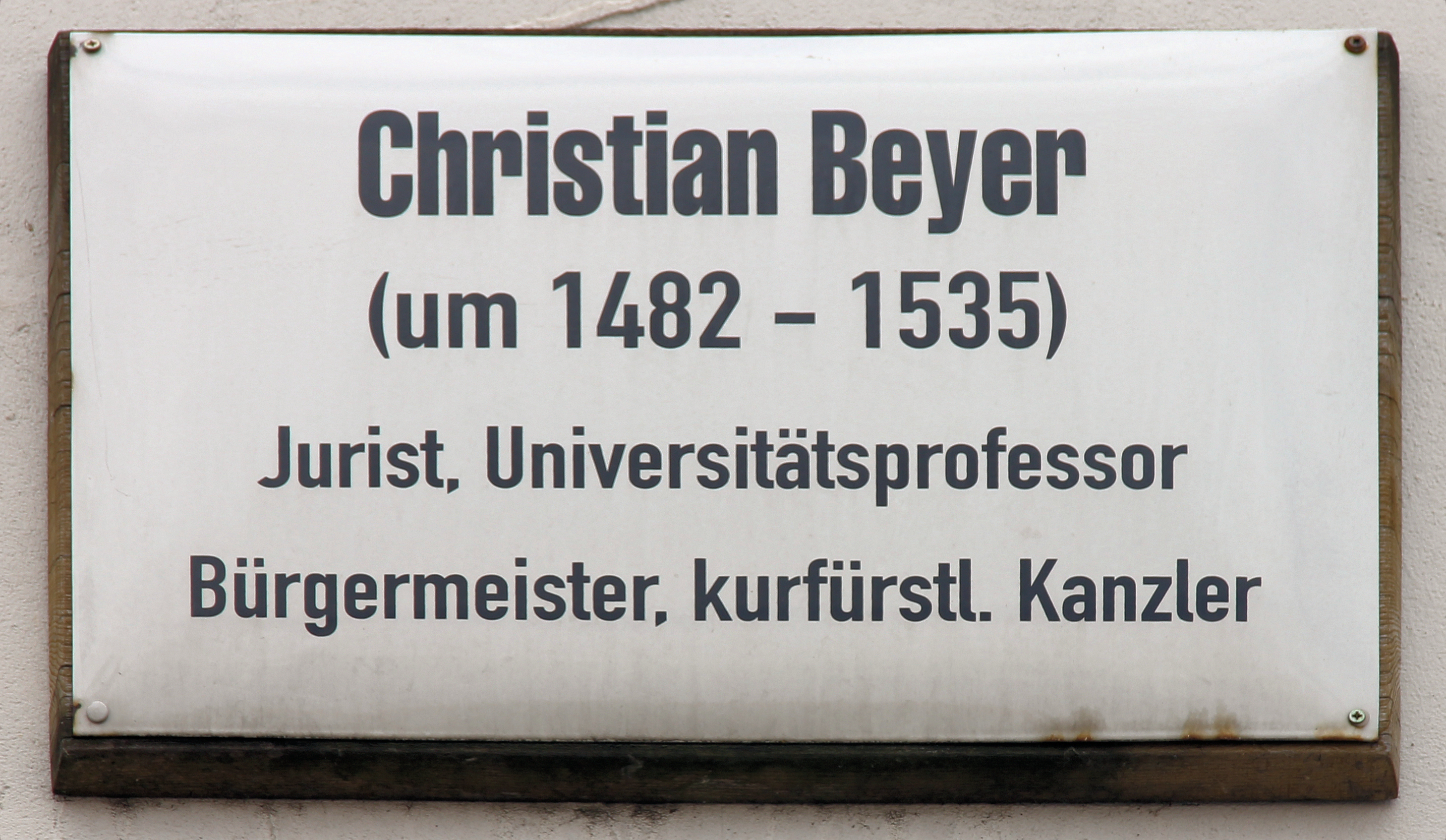
Plack outside Markt 6 Alt-Wittenberg

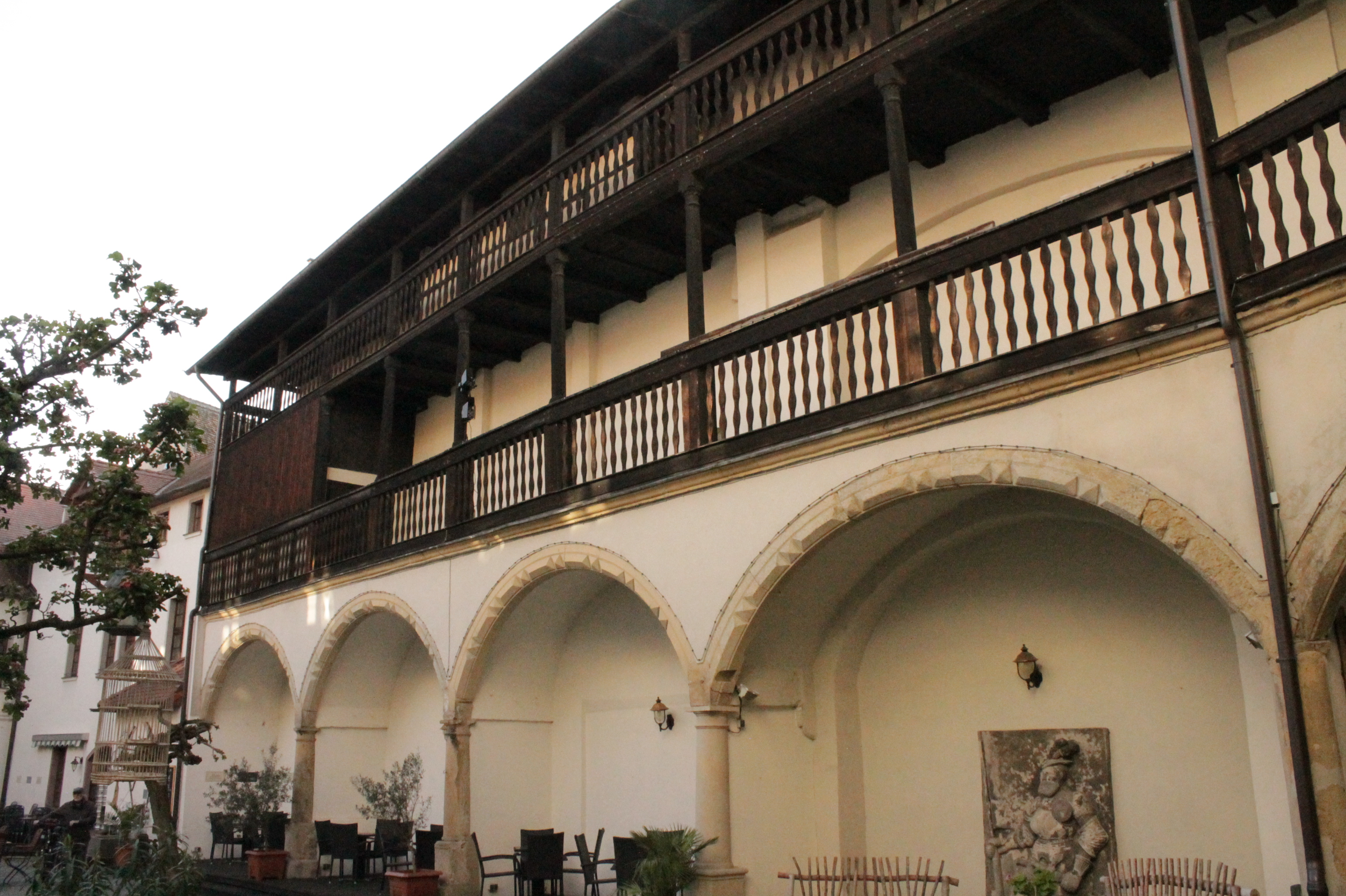
Christian Beyer's House, Wittenberg

Christian Beyer (1482, Kleinlangheim – 21 October 1535, Weimar) was a Saxon Chancellor, international lawyer and Protestant reformer. In documents partially different names and spellings can be found (Bayer, Peyer, Bayarius, Bayoarius, Bavarus, Cristoferus Bauari, etc.).

== Personalia ==
Christian Beyer was born in 1482 Kleinlangheim in Lower Franconia, now part of Bavaria the son of the town bailiff Hans Beyer. He enrolled in winter semester 1500/1501 at the University of Erfurt, Thuringia. In the summer of 1503 the young Franken was accredited as Cristoferus Bauari de Lanckhem (i.e. Christianus Baierus, Quinomen Magnum.) to the free University of Wittenberg in the former spa town of Wittenberg in Saxony.

According to the historic collection of Wittenberg University, he became one of the first students at the newly founded free establishment with a fast gaining reputation. In 1505 he obtained the master's degree and in 1507 they called the highly talented young man as a teacher at the “Artistic Faculty” (~Legal Faculty).

Three years later (1510), he received his doctorate from the new Faculty of Law as Doctorado [~PhD] in both law disciplines. He also got married in the same year to Magdalena Gertitz (Corticus), daughter of Wittenberg Mayor Ambrosius Gertitz (Corticus).

From this marriage he had a son Christian Beyer, the Younger (d. 1561) and a daughter Barbara Beyer (she later was married to Leonard D. Stetner, the District Registrar of Ansbach province.)

He bought the property “Market no.6”, in centre of the old town (Alt-Stadt) Wittenberg, the now constituting the now famous "Beyer-Hof”. Already in 1512 his house was victim of a fire outbreak, but the professor began as early as the same year with the reconstruction of the house. Because he suffered so much in construction costs, he later asked the Elector of Saxony to increase his annual salary by 30 florins.

This building was like most of the major buildings of the time also lodging for students. Payments for boarding and lodging of the students were an important source of income for the town's citizens, as well as for the mentors and professors.

It is well known even in the houses of Martin Luther and Philipp Melanchthon's students was staying and living.

== Saxon Councillary Service ==
1513 became Dr. jur. Christian Beyer the legal councillor of Frederick III, Elector of Saxony and also for the first time elected as town Mayor. He served as Mayor for further periods in the years 1516, 1519, 1522 and 1525 and served in the years 1520, 1523 and 1526 as a consulting former Mayor, the Council of Wittenberg.

In the years of advancing the Reformation, so he turned his endeavours for the town of Wittenberg towards fulfilling his teaching post at the university. Nevertheless, Martin Luther criticized him initially because he did not immediately renounced the papal principles, and because of his stubbornness to continue the “Jus Canonicum” .

He soon altered his opinion and strode in the aftermath to a conversion to the Reformed faith. In October 1520, Christian Beyer and other members of the Electoral Councils the advice to Frederick III, Elector of Saxony on the threat of excommunication bull against Martin Luther. They argued that the issue "should be treated the matter as harmless and dilatory”.

In 1521, the “Wittenberg movement” began among the Augustinian monks of the monastery of Wittenberg. The first church services in accordance to the Pope's way was abolished in the Castle and Town Church in Wittenberg. [Martin] Luther held at that time a hiding place on the Wartburg Castle, and did not know what strides his religious brethren was conducting in Wittenberg. When he heard this, he wrote them a letter. In which, he congratulated them and wished that the “project happy operations were carried out”. This letter shows, however, that the monks were not unanimous or undiversified. George Spalatin, the Saxon Elector's theological adviser, had restrained them to moderation, out of concern that Martin Luther could gain even more resentment of his adversaries.

However, this process had reached the ears of the Prior of the Augustinians, Conrad Held. He did not agree with what had occurred, and made a strong notion towards an abolition of the strides. He denounced the Augustinian monk Gabriel Didymun, as ringleader of the movement. The Elector himself was apparently very upset by this news and sent his Chancellor Dr. Gregor Brück to the academy in order to prevent the undertaking. However, the Augustinian friars were able to convince the old Chancellor that this approach was wrong, so that he officially changed his position in this debate. However, the Elector was with not all satisfied with his statement in this issue. Therefore, he instructed Vice-Chancellor Dr. Christian Beyer with a further clarification of the matter. However, Christian Beyer could not achieve anything amongst the monks, because the monks had a conviction of their conscience.

Based on this dispute probably not only Frederick III, Elector of Saxony converted to the new gospel, but also Christian Beyer. Following the successful implementation of the monks, it also made the other churches to implement these changes.

== Expatrial period in Denmark ==
From 1519/20 he and Martin Luther were invited to Denmark by King Christian II. While Luther abstained he made the long journey and acted as an assigned as legal adviser to King and the Queen of Denmark, who through the Nordic Kalmar Union also was regent of Sweden as well as Norway. He initiated legal studies at University of Copenhagen in 1522-23 and was the main author of a new Nordic legislation, of which King Christian II quite prematurely attempted to introduce onto the Nordic Kingdom (Kalmar Union). There were significant resistance to this, particularly among the nobility of Sweden, where in 1520 was a violent skirmish which in retrospect is called "Stockholm Bloodbath," where as many as 70 were killed. This led further to accession of Gustav Wasa as King of Goths and Swedes and the final end of the Nordic Kalmar Union. The suggested legislation was halted and not introduced in Norway and King Christian II had to dethrone himself as King and escape to his daughter, who in fact was married to Frederick III, Elector of Saxony in Weimar. On 16 June 1524 he was given the mission for Queen Elizabeth of Denmark to bring a suit against the Holstein nobility over confiscated lands. (Ref. Munich fonts # 531) The case was settled in the German Supreme Court in Altenburg, in full favor of the Royal claim.

Later in 1522 Christian Beyer was back in Saxony and again became very busy as Town Mayor.

== Time of emerging struggle ==
Andreas Bodenstein von Karlstadt, gave instruction that schools and churches should be stormed to remove and destroy pictures and precious insignia. This is denoted in history as “Iconoclasm”. Because Christian Beyer was council member of University of Wittenberg and also the Town Council, he had to calm down turmoil caused and restore community order. It can be hard to imagine how the shrewd lawyer obtained a solution between the Elector and Andreas von Karlstad. However, he was able to initially alleviate these efforts through mediator's settlements.

The consequences of the Reformation development, not always met the consensus of the citizens of the town. Between the council and the reformers there was negotiated a consensus of social order that was brought into force.

However, the town barber surgeon Valten, publicly insulted the reformer Martin Luther and the Mayor Beyer, with his remark “they were worthy to be chased out of the state". He was later fined for profanity through his remarks.

On 7 July 1526 brought Luther's wife, Katharina von Bora, her son John to the world. The infant was baptized in accordance with custom on the same day 16 o’clock in the church by the deacon George Rörer. Among the sponsors, who all belonged to the inner circle around the reformer, are Johannes Bugenhagen, Justus Jonas, the Elder, Lucas Cranach the Elder, the wife of the mayor Hohndorf Benedicta (d. 1546) and the Saxon Vice-Chancellor Christian Beyer. Luther called his old friend from now, in mutual recognition, his "godfather".

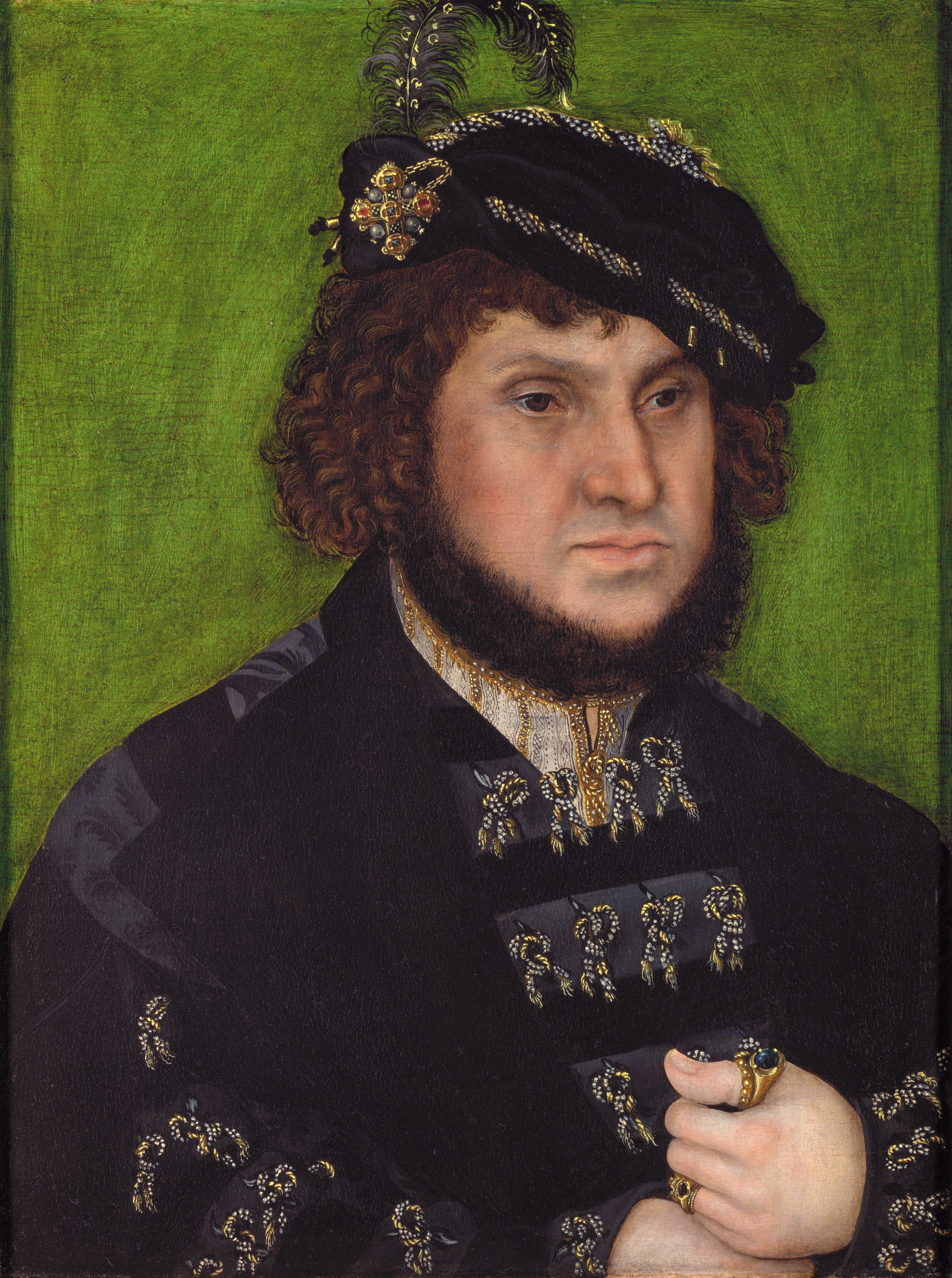
John the Steadfast

When the Saxon Elector Frederick, the Clever died in 1528 and his brother John took over stately business of government, Christian Beyer was called at the court as Chancellor of John, Elector of Saxony (John, "the Steadfast", in Weimar. He was one of the highest officials of the Electorate. Beyer now put an end to his teaching at Wittenberg University "Leucorea”. He joined Wittenberg Town Council replacing Gregor Brück in 1529.

== The Diet of Augsburg ==
In the capacity as Chancellor of Saxony, we now find him in the proceedings of the Elector again from 1529. Furthermore, as the Chancellor of Saxony he performed the on 25 June 1530 in the afternoon from 3 until 5 o'clock Diet of Augsburg to Emperor Charles V and the other Electors of the Holy Roman Empire with the German edition of "Augsburg Confession", as skilfully developed by Philipp Melanchthon.

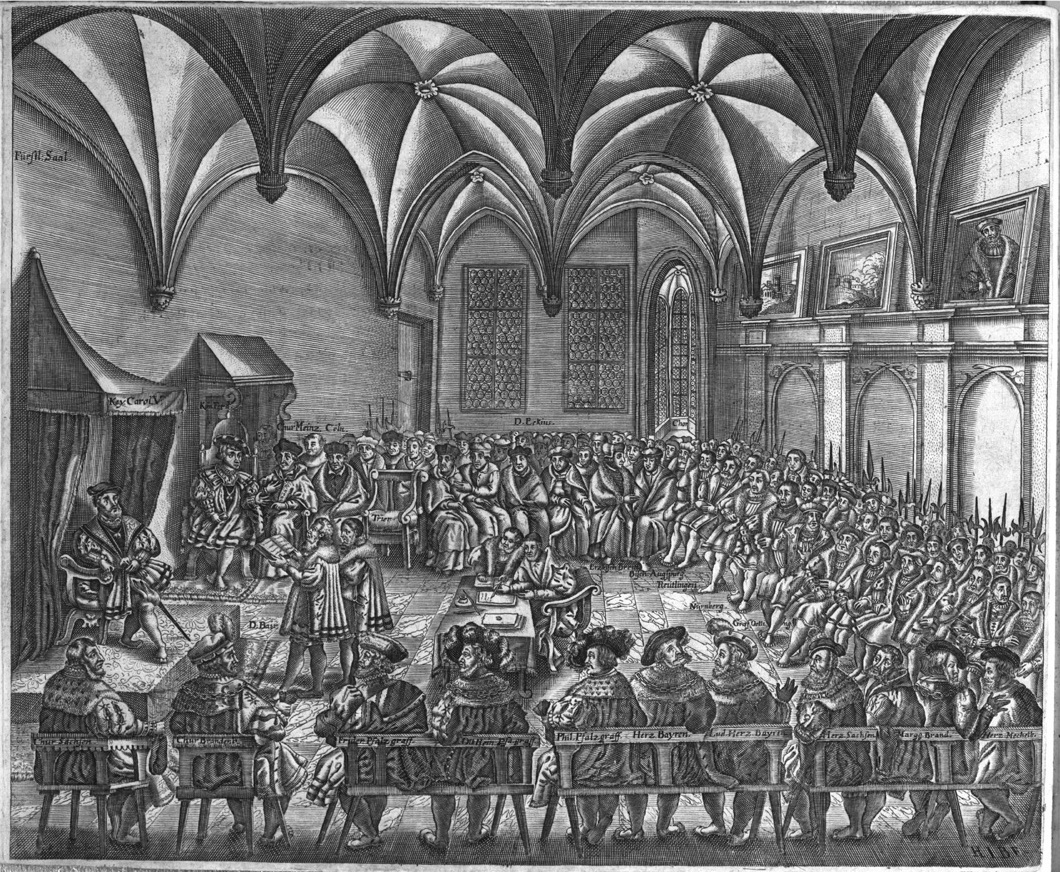
Reading of the Confessio Augustana in front of Emperor Charles V at the Diet of Augsburg, 1530

The session was held in the chapter-hall of the Episcopal Palace. He read it aloud and was widely heard, so that the crowd, which stood close together in the outside courtyard, could understand word for word of the speech through the open window. This is the first official and until now has remained firm commitment of the Evangelical Lutheran Church. In 1532 of his chancellery phase, he served in the succession homage proceedings of John, Elector of Saxony in the city of Gotha, as when he also was at the convention in Brunswick to confirm the formal council authority of the town Buttelstädt. In 1533 he was invested as witness to the dispute regarding the Elector's financial credit given to Wolffen, Count of Barby, and the Castle and township of Barby and it's signed “Privileges of Werdau”.In 1534 he was in the then Upper Kranichfeld (today Kranichfeld), where he exhibited the Credit documents.

In 1535 the Chancellor Christian Beyer was a member of the Arbitration Court held between the Elector John Frederick of Saxony and Duke George of Saxony. The proceedings for the prominent gentlemen of Hofgarten was to be held in Leipzig. However, before it could come to the legal proceedings, he died on 21 October 1535 in Weimar, suffering severe stomach cramps.

His property Beyerhof in Wittenberg was passed to his son Christian Beyer jr. in the same year.

An Epitaph was built in 1917, in the village church of Kleinlangheim, honouring their great son of the Reformation. In his original residential building located in the Lutherstadt Wittenberg, there is also commemorative plaque of him. A similar sandstone grave plaque has recently been found in Weimar City Church and can now be seen adjacent to his gravesite inside the church.

== Family history ==
On 3 October 1510 he married Magdalena, daughter of the Mayor of Wittenberg, Ambrosius Gertitz. From this marriage is 21 (in question for misinterpretation?) children to have emerged. After the death of Beyer Philipp Melanchthon was granted custody care of his younger (adopted?) children.

These are known as children of Magdalena:

- Christian Beyer, the younger, married in 1541 Sybille († September 8, 1563 in Wittenberg), the daughter of a physician Stephen Wild
- In year 1545 Caspar married Sibyl Beyer
- Andreas Beyer [family descending from him lived in Kleinlangheim up to 2001.]
- Georg Beyer married Catharina Albrecht. He was a princely Council and Mayor in Gera. 3 of their sons, George, Andreas, and Henrich, was employed by Duke Hans, the Elder in Haderslev, Schleswig, Denmark. A daughter also married in Flensburg. A fourth son, Johannes (Hans) became Mayor of Eisenberg. Georg (Jörg/Jürgen) Beyer, the Younger (c. 1522 to 1587) was Secretary to the Duke Hans, the Elder in 1547, married Magdalena Richertsen in 1553, the daughter of Mayor of Flensborg, Denmark (now Flensburg, Germany). A famous Epitaph of the family is found in St. Mary (St.Marien) Church in Flensburg, Germany. He is also listed in the Danish Dansk Biografisk Leksikon. Many descendants lives in currently in Germany, Denmark, Norway, USA, France, Argentine and Spain.
- Ascanius Beyer
- Barbara Beyer, married to the Royal Chancellor to the Margrave of Ansbach Leonard Stetner († 1601 in Naumburg)
- Johann Beyer became County Commissioner in Altenburg [the city holding the German Supreme Court]

== Sources ==
- Horst Schlechte: "Beyer, Christian". In: New German Biography (NDB). Band 2 Duncker & Humblot, Berlin 1955, p. 204
- Theodor Muther: "Beyer, Christian". In: General German Biography (ADB). Band 2 Duncker & Humblot, Leipzig 1875, p. 596 f.
- Paul Gottlieb Kettner: The council of the College-Chur-Wittenberg. Wolfenbüttel, 1734
- Walther Killy: German Biographical Encyclopedia. Volume 1, Saur, Munich 1999, ISBN 3-598-23160-1
- Nicolas Müller: The movement of Wittenberg in 1521 and 1522: The events in and around Wittenberg during Luther's Wartburg stay. Letters, files and personal details etc. 2. Edition, Leipzig, 1911
- Heinz Scheible: Melanchthon's correspondence (MBW) Volume 11
- Friedrich Wilhelm Bautz: Christian Beyer
- Olav Busch Beyer addendum based on Diplomatarium Norvegicum (The Munich Fonts)
