= Articles of Schwabach =

Beginning in July 1529, Philipp Melanchthon, along with Martin Luther and probably Justus Jonas, wrote the Articles of Schwabach (German: Artikel von Schwabach, so named because they were presented at the Convention of Schwabach on 16 October of the same year), as a confession of faith with other Wittenberg theologians. Material from this document was later incorporated into the Augsburg Confession written by Philipp Melanchthon in 1530.
