= Christoph Langenmantel =

German Carmelite friar and nobleman (1488–1538)

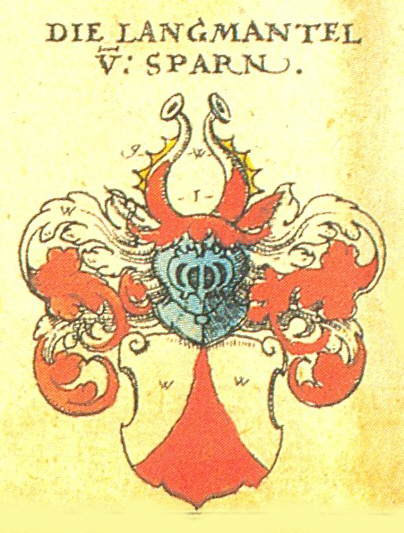
Coat of arms of the Langenmantel vom Sparren

Christoph Langenmantel or Christoph Langenmantel vom Sparren (1488, in Augsburg – 17 May 1538, in Ingolstadt) was a nobleman, Carmelite friar, canon of Freising and a supporter of Martin Luther.

== Family ==
He was from the Langenmantel vom Sparren family, an Augsburg patrician family. His parents were mayor Georg Langenmantel vom Sparren (born 1521) and Anna née Ilsung. Georg was highly valued by Maximilian I, Holy Roman Emperor and served in his war against Venice. In 1520 he travelled with Konrad Peutinger to Bruges to welcome Charles V on behalf of the city.

Christoph's brother Sigmund (died 1545) was a judge and pfleger in Kelheim, where his epitaph survives in the Pfarrkirche Mariä Himmelfahrt. Another brother, Ulrich (died 1570) worked on the councils of Bavaria and Baden-Baden as well as hofmeister and one of the Catholic guardians of count Philibert.

His sister Maria was a Benedictine nun at Holzen Abbey and was its abbess between 1538 and 1553.

Charitas, another sister, became abbess of Marienstein Abbey in 1544 and there received the Benedictine nuns from Bergen Abbey near Neuburg an der Donau, expelled by Otto Henry, Elector Palatine.

His father's brother was Johann IX. Langenmantel vom Sparren (died 1505), longtime mayor of Augsburg and Knight of the Golden Spurs. His great-uncle was Ulrich Langenmantel, stiftpropst to the Völkermarkt in Carinthia and founder of the first Studienstiftung in Augsburg.

== Life ==
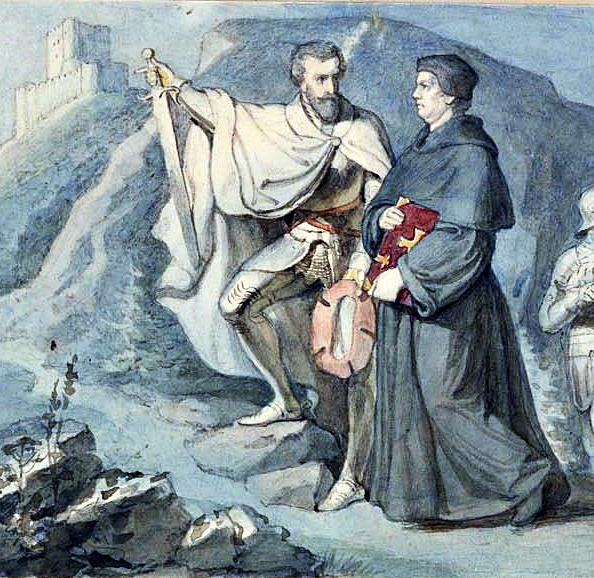
Wilhelm Lindenschmit the Elder's 1835 fresco for Maximilian II Joseph of Bavaria at the Schloss Hohenschwangau - it shows the legend that Christoph not only got Luther out of Augsburg but also led him to Hohenschwangau. This legend has no historical evidence behind it.

From October 1500 he studied in the University of Ingolstadt and from May 1506 at the University of Tübingen. From 1510 he was treasurer and cupbearer to Matthäus Lang, the bishop of Gurk and later a cardinal. He entered the Carmelite order and belonged to the St Anna Abbey in Augsburg as well as later becoming a priest-canon at Freising Cathedral.

After the Diet of Augsburg Martin Luther had to appear at the Fuggerhäuser in 1518 before cardinal Thomas Cajetan to answer for his 95 theses. He arrived in the city on 7 October and left on 20 October - during his stay he lived in the same abbey as Langenmantel, who took care of him and gave him advice. On 12–14 October negotiations took place between Luther and Cajetan, but he refused to revoke his theses, putting him in real danger of arrest. Christoph's father Georg was then serving as mayor and on the night of 19–20 October Christoph led Luther through a secret gate in the city wall to escape. According to tradition, Christoph said "Da hinab" ("Down there") when they reached the gate - it is still named after that phrase, as recorded in an inscription there. Luther sent him a letter of thanks from Wittenberg on 25 November 1518.

Despite his sympathy for Luther and his concerns, Christoph Langenmantel did not convert to Protestantism.

== Bibliography ==
- Hugo Kögerl: Die Epitaphien der Garnisonskirche (ehemals Minoritenkirche) in Ingolstadt, Ingolstadt, 1917, S. 71
- Franz Xaver Ostermair: Genealogische Nachrichten über verschiedene theils noch blühende theils erloschene Geschlechter, Ingolstadt, 1885, S. 103
