= Diet of Augsburg =

Meetings of the Imperial Diet of the Holy Roman Empire which were held in Augsburg

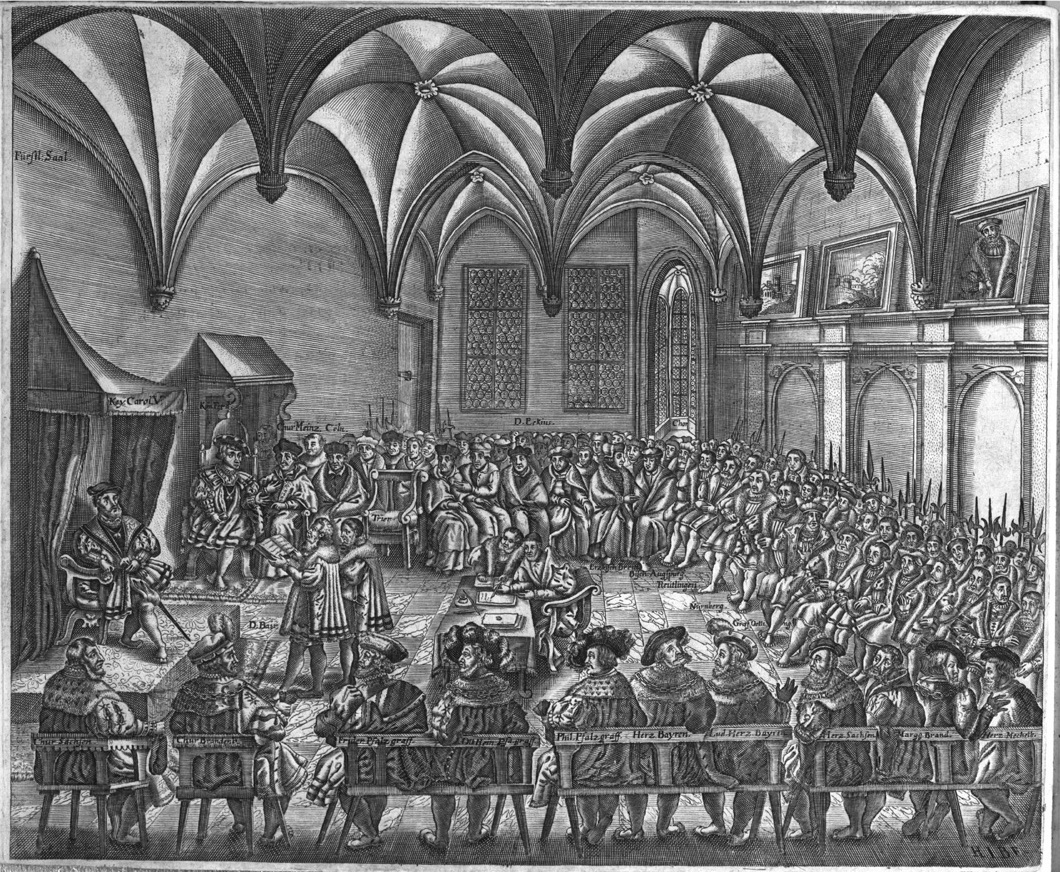
Saxon chancellor Christian Beyer proclaiming the Augsburg Confession in the presence of Emperor Charles V, 1530

The diets of Augsburg were the meetings of the Imperial Diet of the Holy Roman Empire held in the German city of Augsburg. Both an Imperial City and the residence of the Augsburg prince-bishops, the town had hosted the Estates in many such sessions since the 10th century. In 1282, the diet of Augsburg assigned the control of Austria to the House of Habsburg. In the 16th century, twelve of thirty-five imperial diets were held in Augsburg, a result of the close financial relationship between the Augsburg-based banking families such as the Fugger and the reigning Habsburg emperors, particularly Maximilian I and his grandson Charles V. Nevertheless, the meetings of 1518, 1530, 1547/48 and 1555, during the Reformation and the ensuing religious war between the Catholic emperor and the Protestant Schmalkaldic League, are especially noteworthy. With the Peace of Augsburg, the cuius regio, eius religio principle let each prince decide the religion of his subjects and inhabitants who chose not to conform could leave.

== The Diet of 1518 ==
An Imperial Diet took place at Augsburg from July to October 1518, during the reign of Maximilian I, who died a few months later. He tried, among other things, to appoint his grandson Charles as King of Romans, in order to guarantee his accession to the throne, but he failed. (His only son Philip had died in 1506.)

The Elector Frederick persuaded the pope Leo X to have Luther examined at Augsburg, where the Imperial Diet was held, instead of being called to Rome. Between 12 and 14 October 1518 Luther defended himself under questioning by papal legate Cardinal Cajetan. The pope's right to issue indulgences was at the centre of the dispute between the two men. The hearings degenerated into a shouting match. More than writing his theses, Luther's confrontation with the church cast him as an enemy of the pope: "'His Holiness abuses Scripture', retorted Luther. 'I deny that he is above Scripture'." Cajetan's original instructions had been to arrest Luther if he failed to recant, but the legate desisted from doing so. With help from the Carmelite friar Christoph Langenmantel, Luther slipped out of the city at night, unbeknownst to Cajetan.

== Proceedings ==
Emperor Charles V could not bring himself to openly discuss the matters of religious dispute and cause for division throughout Europe so he often stayed away from the sessions of the Diet. Instead he sent his younger brother Ferdinand I to have authority over discussions.

The Diet was organized into three separate colleges: Prince-electors, ecclesiastical and secular sovereigns, and imperial cities. However, unlike other diets, the Diet did not possess fixed rules or methods to conduct. Tradition for the Diet of Augsburg began to emerge in the 1530s and the sessions were to be conducted under these guidelines. Either the emperor or the estates organized day-to-day business of the diet and the proposito functioned as the agenda for the Diet but could be easily altered by the convention.

The business of the Diet was conducted on three levels; the committees, the colleges, and the plenary session. The plenary sessions or colleges created the committees; this level was staffed by members and/or experts of the Diet. The committees would prepare material that would be discussed by colleges and once acted upon, the issue entered the plenary session stage, however this was only ceremonial during the Diet of Augsburg.

The issue would continue to be discussed independently then collectively by the College of Electors and College of Sovereigns. Once they were able to confer on a decision the College of Cities would be informed. If they also agreed to the decision this would become a final decision and passed to the Emperor. If the Emperor approved this recommendation he could adopt it but if there were any issues or concerns he would send it back and the process would start again.

== The Diet of 1530 and the Augsburg Confession ==
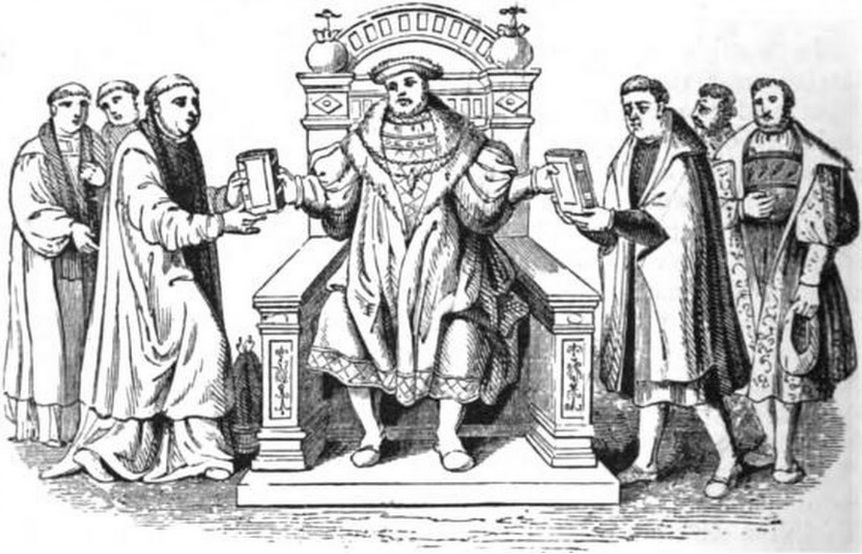
Confutatio Augustana and Confessio Augustana being presented; this picture is somewhat ahistorical because a written copy of the Confutatio was never provided by the Catholics; rather they had to go off of stenographers they had brought with them just in case the Catholics wouldn't give them a copy.

The 1530 Imperial Diet of Augsburg was requested by Emperor Charles V to decide on three issues: first, the defense of the Empire against the Ottoman threat; second, issues related to policy, currency and public well being; and, third, disagreements about Christianity, in attempt to reach some compromise and a chance to deal with the German situation. The Diet was inaugurated by the emperor on 20 June. It produced numerous outcomes, most notably the 1530 declaration of the Lutheran estates known as the Augsburg Confession (Confessio Augustana), a central document of Lutheranism that was presented to the emperor.

=== Background ===
The Ninety-five Theses, published by Martin Luther in 1517, had sparked the Reformation in the German lands and an increasing number of princes turned Protestant. After the Great Peasants' Revolt was suppressed, the 1530 Diet was convoked to calm rising tensions over Protestantism, especially due to fears of the Ottoman advance; the forces of Sultan Suleiman the Magnificent had almost taken the Habsburg residence Vienna in 1529 and Emperor Charles V wanted Christianity to unite against the invasions. After the 1521 Diet of Worms had imposed an Imperial ban on Martin Luther and his tracts, problems of enforcement emerged, as Charles' wars against France and commitments in the rest of his empire prevented him from focusing on German religious problems.

On August 3, 1529, the emperor having witnessed the protest at Speyer signed a successful peace treaty with France. After these successes, Charles aimed to assert his control over what he saw as German religious heresies. At the Diet of Speyer, the Edict of Worms was affirmed, resulting in the Protestation at Speyer enacted by the Lutheran princes.

=== Creation ===
The Augsburg Confession was intended "to be an expression of the faith of the universal Church, and thus a basis for a reconciliation between the Lutheran Reformers and the Roman Church". It had been prepared by Philipp Melanchthon and Johannes Brenz at the behest of John, Elector of Saxony. Based on Melanchthon's earlier Articles of Schwabach, it contained twenty-one succinct articles of faith to show that the doctrines preached did not violate the norms that were traditionally present as well as justifications for the changes in worship and life that occurred from abusive traditions.

The Confession was presented to the emperor on 25 June. During the Diet, Melanchthon withstood a variety of attacks while formulating the text. According to Joachim Camerarius, his first biographer, he "did not bend the truth to win favor or meet objections; at the same time he avoided unnecessary conflict". Camerarius also mentions that during the diet, Melanchthon cried when hearing his work during this intense time of negotiations. Melanchthon hastily rewrote the materials that he brought with him to Augsburg upon learning of the 404 articles which condemned the writings of the reformers as heretical.

There has been a long dispute regarding the Augsburg Confession and what type of confession it truly is. One suggestion is that it is a political and theological confession, which established the Protestant church. A second view is that it is a catholic confession that dispensed with minor teachings such as penance. During the 16th century the tensions and relationship that existed between the Emperor, the Pope, the German Princes and the Protestants were quite complex. The confessions of the early centuries of the church were evoked by the Protestant Reformation and of the tensions that existed in the Church. The confession represented Protestant beliefs during the time of intense political and religious pressures. The Confession did discuss the basis and role of the papal authority in the Church "but it was decided not to incorporate a statement of the Lutheran position on the papacy in the confession in order to avoid upsetting Charles V and running the risk that he might simply refuse to negotiate with the Lutheran part at the Diet".

=== Martin Luther's contribution ===
At the time of the Diet of Augsburg, Martin Luther was an outlaw of the Empire and as a result was unable to be present at the Diet. Staying at the Veste Coburg, he made himself present through a variety of publications including the composition of "Admonition to All the Clergy Assembled at Augsburg". Luther's influence was limited to preparatory documents which were delivered on his behalf. Five hundred copies were quickly sold and circulated around during the Diet. A member of the Saxon group, Justus Jonas, wrote that Luther's work seemed inspired while "rebuking the haughtiness of the higher clergy, forcefully asserting 'the article on necessity', and reducing the opponents to silence".

Further, Luther's impact was evident in August 1530 with the increased resistance of the Protestants to demands for concessions in the later stages of negotiations. Luther was able to read Melanchthon's confession at an early stage, and admitted that he could have never written it in such a finely-argued way. He did later note that there "was no article on purgatory and no unmasking of the papal Antichrist". Additionally, after reading Melanchthon's work he stated "I have read Master Philip's Apologia and it pleases me very much. During mid-July 1530 Luther was reported as having told a number of friends that he had no expectation that the Diet would lead to any sort of agreement between the two sides.

The General Synod of the Lutheran church accepted the twenty-one doctrinal articles with the Abuses altered.

== Augsburg Interim ==
Following the Diet of Augsburg in 1530 was the Nuremberg Religious Peace which gave the Reformation more time to spread. At the end of this was the Schmalkaldic War and the ensuing Augsburg Interim in 1548 which was the Imperial decree given by Charles V after his army won against the Schmalkaldic League during the Schmalkaldic War of 1547/48. The tensions between Charles V and the German Lutheran princes were finally resolved with the Peace of Augsburg in 1555, which formally acknowledged Protestantism as a legitimate religion of the Empire.

After his victory over the Schmalkaldic League, Charles V convened the Diet of 1547/48 (geharnischter Reichstag - 'harnessed diet', due to its tense atmosphere, very close to outright hostility), where the Augsburg Interim was proclaimed. This attempt to give Catholicism the priority was rejected by many princes, though, and a resolution of the confessional tensions was only achieved at the session in 1555, where the Peace of Augsburg was concluded. The treaty acknowledged the Augsburg Confession and codified the cuius regio, eius religio principle, which gave each prince the power to decide the religion of his subjects.

The decrees of the Council of Trent were acknowledged by the Catholic princes of Germany at the Diet of Augsburg held in 1566.
