= Nicolaus Ferber =

Nicolaus Ferber (1485 – 15 April 1534) was a German Franciscan and controversialist.

== Life ==
Ferber was born at Herborn, Germany. He was made provincial of the Franciscan province of Cologne. Pope Clement VII made him vicar-general of that branch of the order known as the Cismontane Observance, in which capacity he visited the various provinces of the order in England, Germany, Spain, and Belgium.

From about 1520 he was based at Marburg. At the synod of Homberg in 1526 he debated with François Lambert, ex-Franciscan, who had become adviser to Philip of Hesse. Ferber's position became untenable, and he moved to Brühl Abbey.

At the instance of the bishops of Denmark, he was called to Copenhagen to champion the Catholic cause against Danish Lutheranism. He died at Toulouse.

== Works ==
In Copenhagen he wrote in 1530, the Confutatio Lutheranismi Danici, first edited by L. Schmitt, S.J., and published at Quaracchi (1902), which earned for him the sobriquet of 'Stagefyr' (fire-brand).

Ferber's principal work is entitled: Locorum communium adversus hujus temporis hæreses Enchiridion, published at Cologne in 1528, with additions in 1529.

== Publications ==
- Eyn Sendtbrieff durch einen Gardian barfüsser ordenns zu Marpurg mit namen Nicolaus Ferber an den christlichen Fürsten Philippen von Gottes Gnaden Landgraven zu Hessen: Und desselben Fürsten christl. ... antwort ... (1525)
- Locorum communium adversus hujus temporis hæreses Enchiridion (1528)
- Monas Sacrosanctae Eua[n]gelicae doctrinae, ab orthodoxis patribus in haec vsq[ue] secula, veluti per manus tradita (1529)
- Confutatio Lutheranismi Danici (1530)
- Enarrationes latinæ Evangeliorum quadragesimalium, preached in German and published in Latin (Antwerp, 1533).
- Assertiones CCCXXV adversus Fr. Lamberti paradoxa impia etc. (Cologne, 1526, and Paris, 1534)
