= Synod of Homberg =

1526 Catholic synod in Hesse, Germany

Coordinates: 51°02′02″N 9°24′20″E

The Synod of Homberg was a Catholic synod held in Homberg (present-day Hesse, Germany) from 20 to 22 October 1526. The synod was attended by clergy, nobility, and representatives from several European cities. Its primary objectives concerned proposals for the reform of church governance and clerical discipline. The synod convened in response to theological disputes arising from the introduction of Zwinglian reforms in Zurich.

== Description ==
In the early 1520s, governmental authorities in the Holy Roman Empire, France, and England influenced in ecclesiastical affairs. The Diet of Speyer (August 27, 1526) resolved that each territorial authority could determine its own religious policy, pending a general council, provided it remained accountable to God and its respective sovereign.

The synod was convened by Landgrave Philip of Hesse, who summoned "spiritual and temporal estates" to Homberg, "to deal, by the grace of the Almighty, with Christian matters and disputes". Proceedings began on October 20, 1526, in the town church. François Lambert, a Protestant reformer and former Franciscan, presented 158 theses (known as paradoxa), which were posted on the church doors of Homberg.

Following an opening address by the Chancellor, Johan Friis, Lambert read his theses with reference to Scripture. Later that day, Adam Kraft of Fulda translated the text into German and invited objections from attendees. The following day, Nicholas Ferber of Marburg, a Franciscan prior, challenged Landgrave Philip of Hesse's authority to hold a synod or legislate on matters of faith, asserting that such powers belonged to the Pope and clergy.

Ferber later departed from Cologne and published written responses opposing Lambert's theses. On the synod's final day, Johann Sperber cited the Gospel of Luke's Hail Mary in support of traditional Marian devotion.
