= Battle of Mühlberg =

1547 battle of the Schmalkaldic War

- Part of the Schmalkaldic War
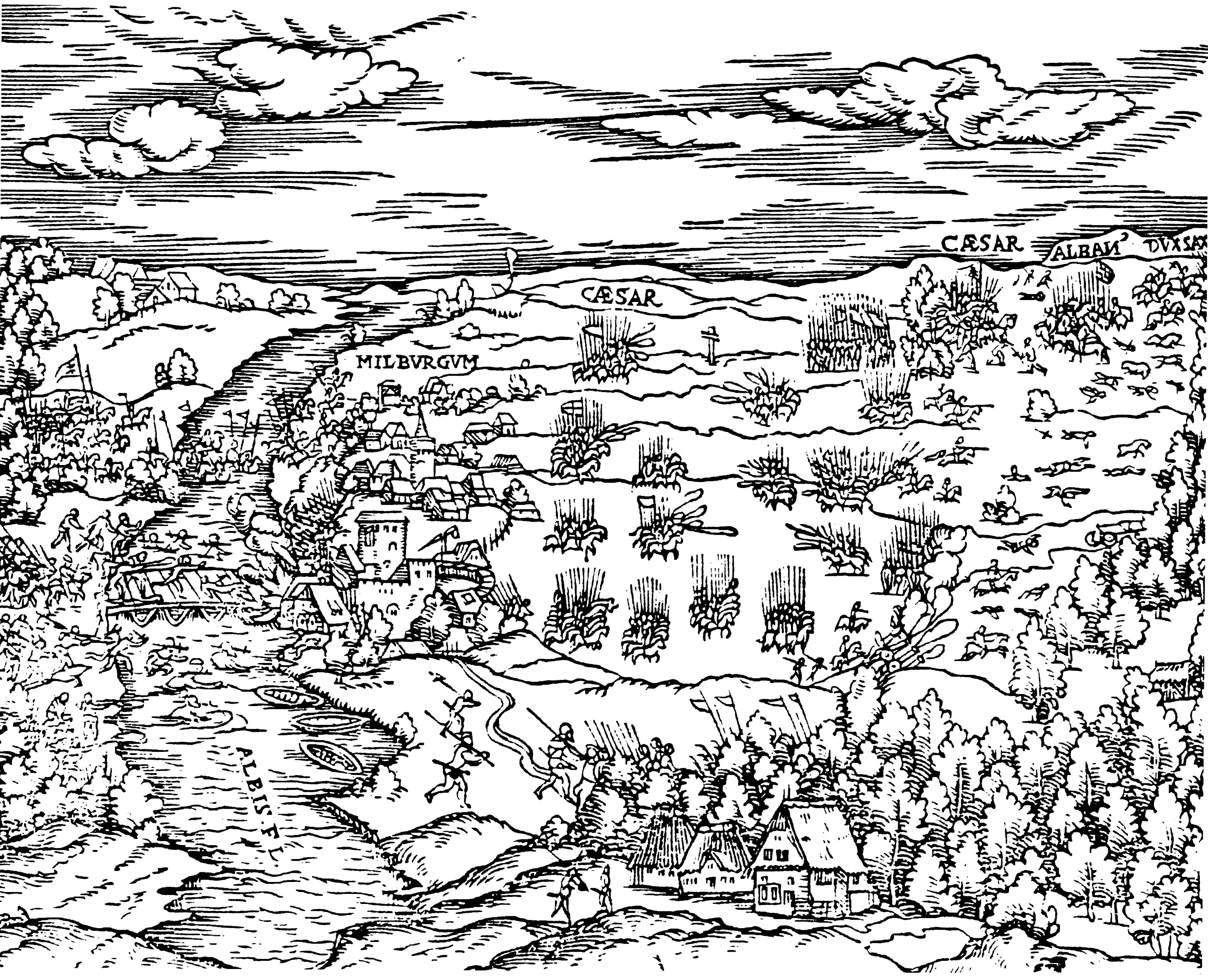
- The Battle of Mühlberg by Luis de Ávila y Zúñiga (1550)
Date	24 April 1547
Location	Mühlberg, Saxony, Holy Roman Empire (present-day Germany) 51°25′59″N 13°13′00″E
Result	Habsburg victory

Belligerents
Schmalkaldic League: Electorate of Saxony; Hesse; Electoral Palatinate; Bremen; Lübeck; Brunswick-Lüneburg; Duchy of Pomerania; Principality of Anhalt-Köthen; Other German territories	Empire of Charles V: Holy Roman Empire; Duchy of Saxony; Spain; Hungary

Commanders and leaders
John Frederick I (POW); Philip I (POW); Philip I Wolfgang	Charles V Duke of Alba; Ferdinand I Maurice of Wettin; Gian Giacomo Medici; Álvaro de Sande

Strength
6,000 infantry and 3,000 cavalry (15 guns)	13,000 infantry and 4,500 cavalry (20 guns)

Casualties and losses
8,000 dead 500 knights 1,000 prisoners	Around 50 dead or wounded

The Battle of Mühlberg took place near Mühlberg in the Electorate of Saxony in 1547, during the Schmalkaldic War. The Catholic princes of the Holy Roman Empire led by the Holy Roman Emperor Charles V decisively defeated the Lutheran Schmalkaldic League of Protestant princes under the command of Elector John Frederick I of Saxony and Landgrave Philip I of Hesse.

The battle ended the Schmalkaldic war and led to the dissolution of the Schmalkaldic League.

== Background ==
The spread of the Protestant Reformation in Germany after 1517 represented a major obstacle to the universalistic projects of Charles V, the Habsburg emperor. Attempts at reconciliation between Lutherans and Catholics at the diets of Speyer of 1526 and 1529 had failed, sharpening the mutual opposition between the two sides.

The Reformation offered to most independent German states the pretext to affirm their autonomy not only on the religious level, but also on the political one. For some of these small states, belonging to the Holy Roman Empire (a political reality that had been fragmented for centuries) was indeed considered not much more than a mere formal act.

In 1531 some princes (most notably Philip I of Hesse and John Frederick, Elector of Saxony) were opposed to the Emperor's attempt to restore religious and political unity in the German lands through the re-proposal of the Worms Edict. This led to the formation of the Schmalkaldic League (named after the town of Schmalkalden in Thuringia where the pact was stipulated), a militarily defensive alliance with a markedly anti-Habsburg and anti-Catholic stance.

Although the birth of a Protestant coalition inside the Empire imperilled his power, Charles V did not initially attack the League. The League meanwhile received support from several free cities (Bremen, Hamburg, Lübeck, Ulm and Strasbourg), wishing to affirm their independence from the central power. The Protestant princes could also count on the support of the Kingdom of France, Charles' main foreign enemy. In need of the military support of the German states in his war against the Ottoman Turks in the eastern regions of his lands, the Emperor chose not to oppose the League and to grant wide autonomy to it. The Protestant leaders were therefore left free to support the Reformation and to fight the power of the Catholic bishops in the lands they controlled.

The conditions that forced Charles V to accept the actions of the League changed after a few years. In 1544 the signing of the Treaty of Crépy ended after decades the conflicts between the Emperor and Francis I of France for the control of the Italian peninsula. After the treaty the League lost the support of the French. Martin Luther's death in 1546 and the temporary cessation of the Turkish threat from the east also put Charles in the best possible condition to focus on the internal enemy that endangered the religious and territorial unity of Imperial Germany.

The opportunity to begin the conflict was given by the rivalry between the elector of Saxony John Frederick I and his cousin Maurice, both belonging to the House of Wettin. Despite his Protestant faith, Maurice had in 1542 refused to join the Schmalkaldic League. In 1546, with the assistance of Ferdinand I, the younger brother of Charles V, Maurice invaded the territory of John Frederick. When the attack begun John Frederick's armies were in Württemberg, but they managed to move to the occupied lands and repel Maurice's forces.

The Emperor decided to take advantage of the divisions between the Protestant armies, and he joined the war in 1547. He occupied Ulm and Württemberg and defeated the Palatine Elector, forcing him to surrender and to leave the League. With the beginning of spring Charles then marched toward Saxony to help Maurice's army and to end his clash with John Frederick, the last Protestant prince still opposing him.

== Previous movements ==
Charles was suffering from gout at that time and his army had to face the desertion of the Papal soldiers that had helped him in the first part of the campaign. In addition the Saxon Elector's army was larger than Charles' forces. However, hoping to encourage a Protestant and anti-imperial uprising in Bohemia, John Frederick took the decision to split his forces and he deployed a large portion of his troops there.

He had also left some small detachments to protect the most vulnerable Saxon cities in order to prevent the entry of Charles' army from the south. With the intention of reaching the well-defended stronghold of Wittenberg, the Elector then marched northwards, abandoning his position in Meissen and camping at the end of April at the town of Mühlberg, leaving only a few troops as guards on the bank of the Elbe river, that he considered too wide to be easily crossed by the imperial forces.

== Battle ==
Titian's Equestrian Portrait of Charles I of Spain and V of the Holy Roman Empire (1548) celebrates Charles' victory at Mühlberg

At the head of his army, Charles V arrived at the Elbe on the evening of 23 April. Despite the contrary opinion of his generals, he decided to attack the enemy forces, resting just a few miles away. At dawn on 24 April the first avant-gardes of the imperial army advanced, looking for a way for all the army to cross the river. Helped by the surprise and by the dense fog that had risen from the river, small groups of Spanish and Italian veteran soldiers managed to swim across the river and eliminate the few Saxon troops that were guarding the other side.

Meanwhile, some troops of the tercios of Lombardy and Naples, that were the most experienced soldiers in Charles' army, followed a plan set by Don Fernando Álvarez de Toledo, Duke of Alba and commander-in-chief of the Imperial troops in Germany and with the help of a local farmer, they managed to spot a ford to use that would allow all the army to cross the Elbe. In addition to this, some veteran soldiers were able to prevent the demolition of a pontoon bridge built by the Saxons, that was immediately used by the Imperial cavalry to pass safely to the other shore.

According to some sources John Frederick had considered an attack from Charles so unlikely that he would have ordered several commanders of his army to go to Mass just when the enemy army was about to complete the crossing of the Elbe. The Saxon forces were completely taken by surprise. As soon as he became aware of the fact, the Elector's first thought was to retreat towards Wittenberg. He soon realized though that his army would be too slow to be prepared to march in a short while; moreover, he was convinced that only a vanguard of the main imperial army was attacking. So he ordered his troops to prepare for battle.

John Frederick chose to deploy his troops along the edge of a forest, in order to prevent a possible encirclement by the imperial cavalry and to have a safer escape route in case of retreat. The emperor Charles V also reached the battlefield and exhorted his troops to fight the Protestants. Due to gout, he was carried to the battle in a litter, rather than mounted in armour on the great warhorse as depicted by his court painter, Titian and assisted to the battle from the rear. The imperial army was made up of about 16–20,000 men. Among them there were the tercio of Lombardy, that of Naples, and that of Hungary, led by Álvaro de Sande.

The battle began in the evening; the Saxon army, mainly made up of peasants, succeeded in repelling the first assaults of the Hungarian cavalry, but the greater number and better preparedness of Charles' soldiers, among the best in the world at that time, decided the fate of the clash. The emperor had placed his cavalry on the two wings of his army. The right wing, under the direct command of the Duke of Alba, was heavier than the left one, led by Maurice of Saxony.

Once the fragile wings of the Saxon army were defeated, the infantry tercios, placed at the center, had a good game in breaking enemy resistance, forcing the Protestants to retreat through the adjacent forest. The Elector of Saxony showed great courage on the battlefield, but was wounded in the face and captured by the imperial troops. The main part of his soldiers were chased and killed or captured.

Some sources report that Emperor Charles V commented on the victory with the sentence Vine, vi y venció Dios (in Spanish "I came, I saw, and God won"), a paraphrase of the famous exclamation pronounced by Julius Caesar.

== Aftermath ==
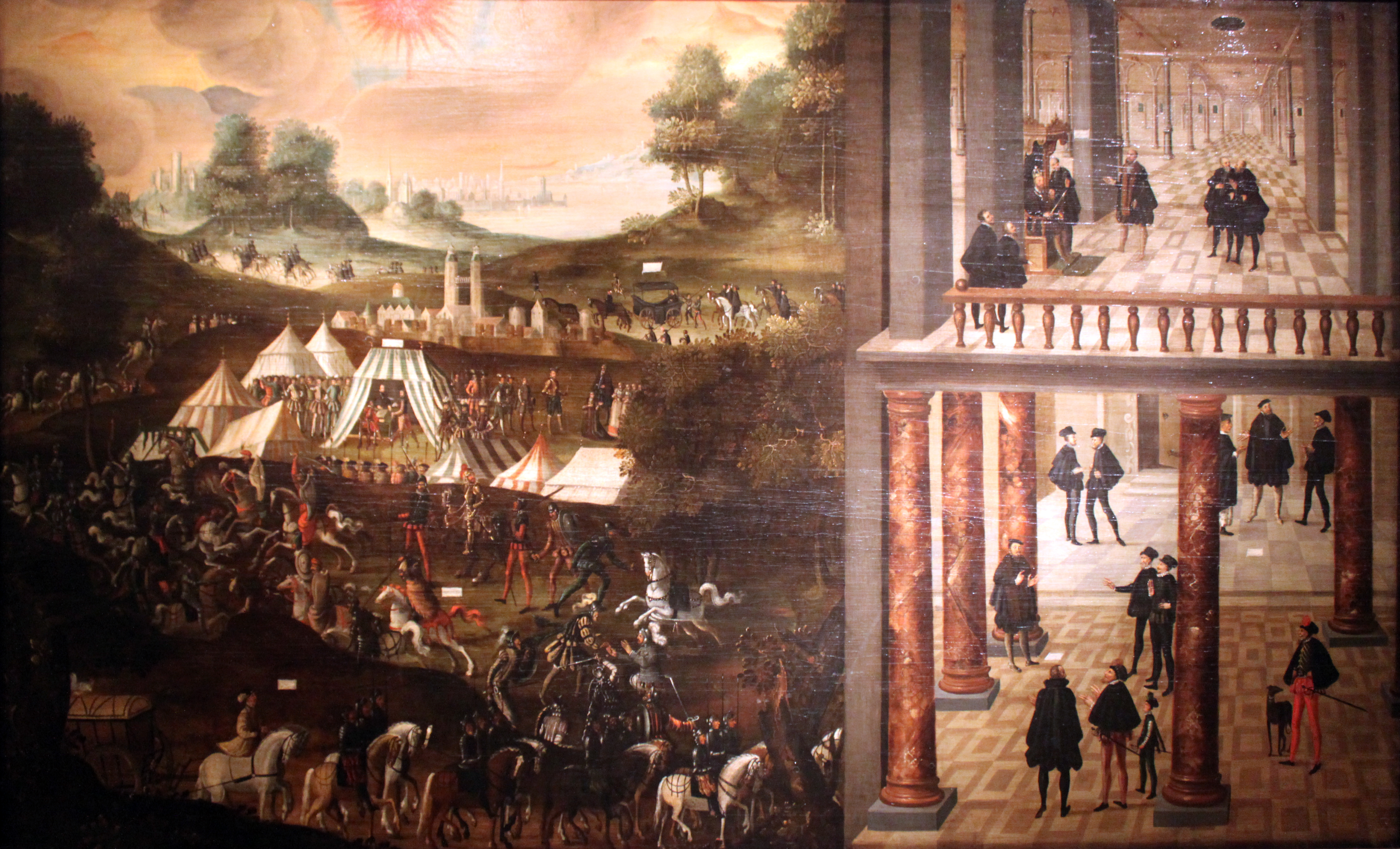
Battle of Mühlberg 1547 and imprisonment of elector Johann Friedrich of Saxony (painting from 1630, Deutsches Historisches Museum)

The battle ended with a complete defeat of the Saxon army which suffered severe losses, estimated at 2000–3000 men. In addition, the Protestants suffered the almost complete capture of their artillery, ammunition, and banners; many soldiers also ended up prisoners. On the imperial side, around fifty soldiers were killed.

John Frederick was responsible for not preparing an adequate defense on the river Elbe; that could have prevented the imperial troops from crossing it. His surrender symbolically sanctioned the end of the Schmalkaldic League. Charles decided to spare his life, but he had to exchange it with the capitulation of the stronghold of Wittenberg. He was condemned as a heretic and imprisoned, and was forced to leave the electoral privilege to his cousin Maurice, who for his help in the imperial victory, was given the control of the Electorate of Saxony. John Frederick was later released in 1552, two years before his death.

The surrender of Philip of Hesse soon afterwards ended the Schmalkaldic War, but the Protestant problem remained unresolved. Many of the princes and key reformers, such as Martin Bucer, fled to England, where they directly influenced the English Reformation. The peace reached between Catholic and Protestants in Germany (Augsburg Interim, 1548) was not enough to bring peace inside the Empire and only in 1555 the Peace of Augsburg stated the end of the wars of religion in the Empire, allowing each ruler to choose between Catholicism and Lutheranism. That principle ended the project to reunite Germany under a single religious confession.

The town of Mühlberg hosts a small museum dedicated to the battle.

== See also ==
- Charles V, Holy Roman Emperor
- Spanish Empire
- Electorate of Saxony
- Schmalkaldic League
- Equestrian Portrait of Charles V
