= Philipp von Hessen =

Philipp von Hessen may refer to:

- Philip I, Landgrave of Hesse (1504-1567)
- Philipp, Landgrave of Hesse (1896-1980)
- Philip III, Landgrave of Hesse-Butzbach (1581-1643)
- Philip of Hesse-Darmstadt (1671-1736)
- Philip, Landgrave of Hesse-Philippsthal (1655-1721)
- Philip II, Landgrave of Hesse-Rheinfels (1541-1583)
