= Margarita of Diez =

German noblewoman

Margarita of Diez (German - Margarethe von Diez; 14 October 1544 – 12 July 1608) was a German noblewoman. Born in Spangenberg, she was the fourth child and eldest daughter of Philip I, Landgrave of Hesse and his second morganatic wife Margarethe von der Saale, whom he had married whilst still married to his first wife Christine of Saxony, with whom he had already had five sons and five daughters.

== Issue ==
By her first marriage to John Bernard of Neu-Eberstein she had:

- Niclaus Stephan (1566-1631)
- Philip III of Eberstein (ca. 1570–1609)
- Barbara
- John Jacob II of Neu-Eberstein (1574–1637/38)

By her second marriage to Stephen Henry of Eberstein she had:

- Sabine Hedwig of Everstein-Quarkenburg (1579–1631)
- Walpurgis of Everstein-Quarkenburg (1580–1613)

== Bibliography (in German) ==
- Eckhart G. Franz: Das Haus Hessen. Kohlhammer Urban, Stuttgart 2005, ISBN 3-17-018919-0, S. 55–57.
- Tina Sabine Römer: Der Landgraf im Spagat? Die hessische Landesteilung 1567 und die Testamente Philipps des Großmütigen. (PDF-Datei; 191 kB) In: Zeitschrift des Vereins für hessische Geschichte (ZHG). 109, 2004, ISSN 0342-3107, S. 31–49, bes. 33.
- Sabine Köttelwesch: Margarethe von der Saale. In: Sabine Köttelwesch: Geliebte, Gemahlinnen und Mätressen. Zehn Frauenschicksale aus dem Umfeld des Kasseler Fürstenhofes. Verein für Hessische Geschichte und Landeskunde, Zweigverein Hofgeismar, Hofgeismar 2004, S. 17–28 (Die Geschichte unserer Heimat Nr. 41, ZDB-ID 24661-x).
- Friedrich Küch (ed.): Politisches Archiv des Landgrafen Philipp des Grossmütigen von Hessen. Band 1. Hirzel, Leipzig 1904, S. 22–32.
