= Luis de Ávila y Zuniga =

Spanish historian (c. 1490-c. 1560)

Luis de Ávila y Zúñiga (c. 1490 – c. 1560) was a Spanish historian.

== Life ==
Born in Plasencia, Ávila y Zúñiga came to the attention of the king of Spain, the Holy Roman Emperor Charles V, serving him as ambassador to Rome. He was made a grand commander of the order of the Knights of Alcantara and accompanied the emperor to Africa in 1541. He also participated with Charles in the war against the Schmalkaldic League, culminating in the Battle of Mühlberg on 24 April 1547.

After the defeat of the Schmalkaldic League, Ávila y Zúñiga wrote a history of the war entitled Commentarios de la guerra de Alemania, hecha de Carlos V en el año de 1546 y 1547 (Commentaries on the war in Germany under Charles V in the years 1546 and 1547). The book, first published in 1548, was very popular in its time, and was translated into French, Dutch, German, Italian, and Latin. Many have since criticized the accuracy of the account, which is very partial to the author's patron, Emperor Charles V.
