= Schmalkaldic League =

Lutheran alliance in the Holy Roman Empire

- Original members in light purple, later members in dark purple.
- Formation: February 1531
- Founded at: Schmalkalden, Hesse, Holy Roman Empire
- Dissolved: 1547
- Type: Military and political alliance
- Members: List: Hesse; Saxony; Brunswick–Lüneburg; Anhalt-Köthen; Ulm; Lübeck; Konstanz; Reutlingen; Memmingen; Lindau; Biberach; Isny; Mansfeld; Magdeburg; Bremen; Strassburg
- Official language: German; Latin
- Leadership: Philip I John Frederick I

The Schmalkaldic League (English: /ʃmɔːlˈkɔːldɪk/; German: Schmalkaldischer Bund; Medieval Latin: Foedus Smalcaldicum or Liga Smalcaldica) was a military alliance of Lutheran principalities and cities within the Holy Roman Empire during the mid-16th century. It received its name from the town of Schmalkalden, where the group was founded in 1531.

Although created for religious motives soon after the start of the Reformation, its members later came to have the intention that the League would replace the Holy Roman Empire as their focus of political allegiance.

While it was not the first alliance of its kind, unlike previous formations, such as the League of Torgau, the Schmalkaldic League had a substantial military to defend its political and religious interests.

== Origins ==
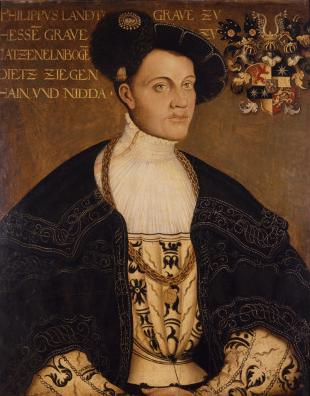
Portrait of Philip I, Landgrave of Hesse

The League was officially established on 27 February 1531 by Philip I, Landgrave of Hesse, and John Frederick I, Elector of Saxony, the two most powerful Protestant rulers in the Holy Roman Empire at the time. It originated as a defensive religious alliance, with the members pledging to defend each other if their territories were attacked by Charles V, the Holy Roman Emperor. At the insistence of the Elector of Saxony, membership was conditional on agreement to the Lutheran Augsburg Confession or the Reformed Tetrapolitan Confession.

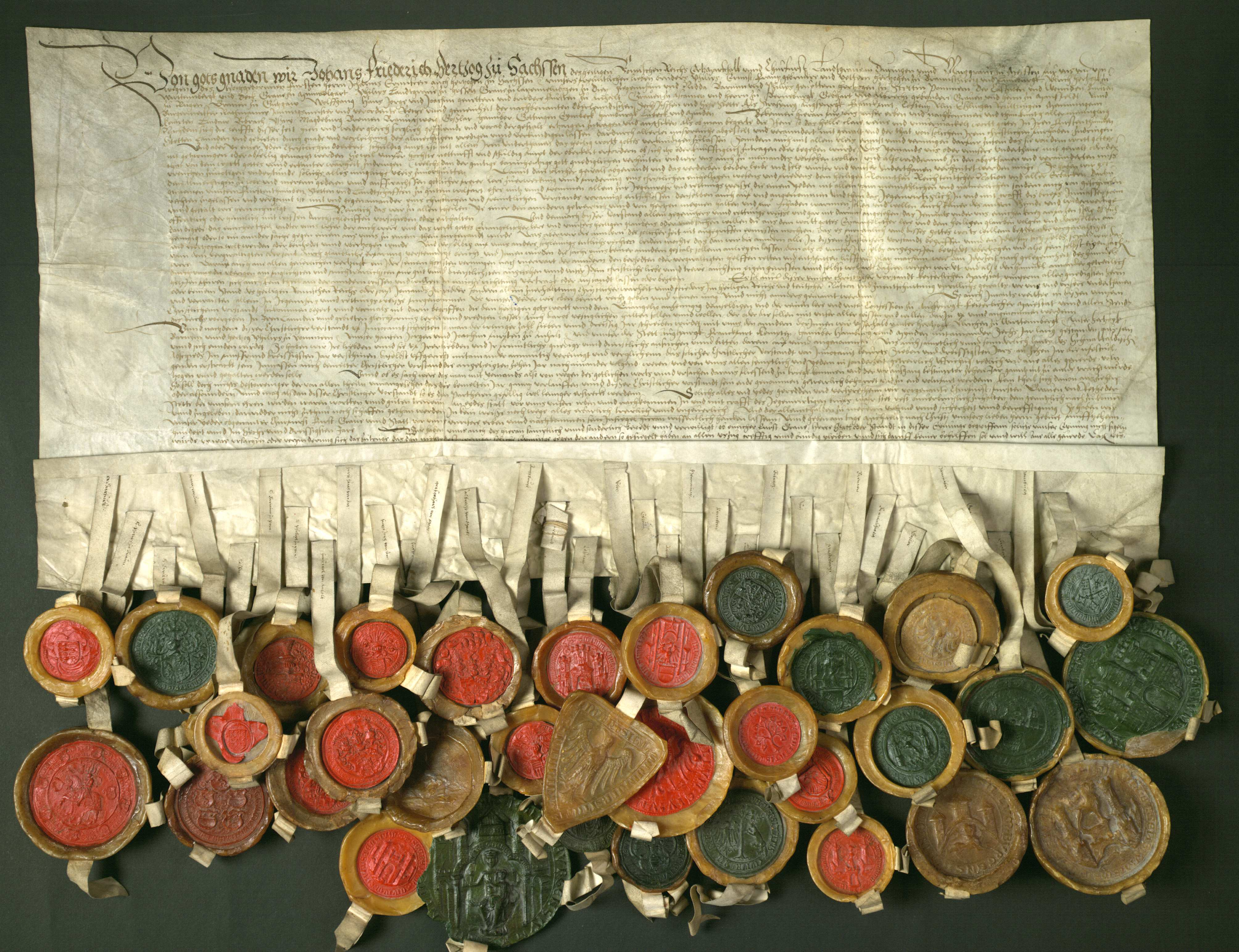
Schmalkaldic League military treaty, extended in 1536

== Nuremberg religious peace ==
The formation of the Schmalkaldic League in 1531 and the threatening attitude of Sultan Suleiman the Magnificent, who, in April 1532, assumed the offensive with an army of 300,000 men, caused Ferdinand of Austria to grant the religious peace.

Ferdinand had made humiliating overtures to Suleiman and as long as he hoped for a favourable response, was not inclined to grant the peace, which the Protestants demanded at the Diet of Regensburg in April 1532. However, as the army of Suleiman drew nearer, he yielded, and on 23 July 1532 the peace was concluded at Nuremberg, where the final deliberations took place.

Those who supported the Reformation obtained religious liberty until the meeting of a council and in a separate compact all proceedings in matters of religion pending before the imperial chamber court were temporarily paused.

== Growth ==
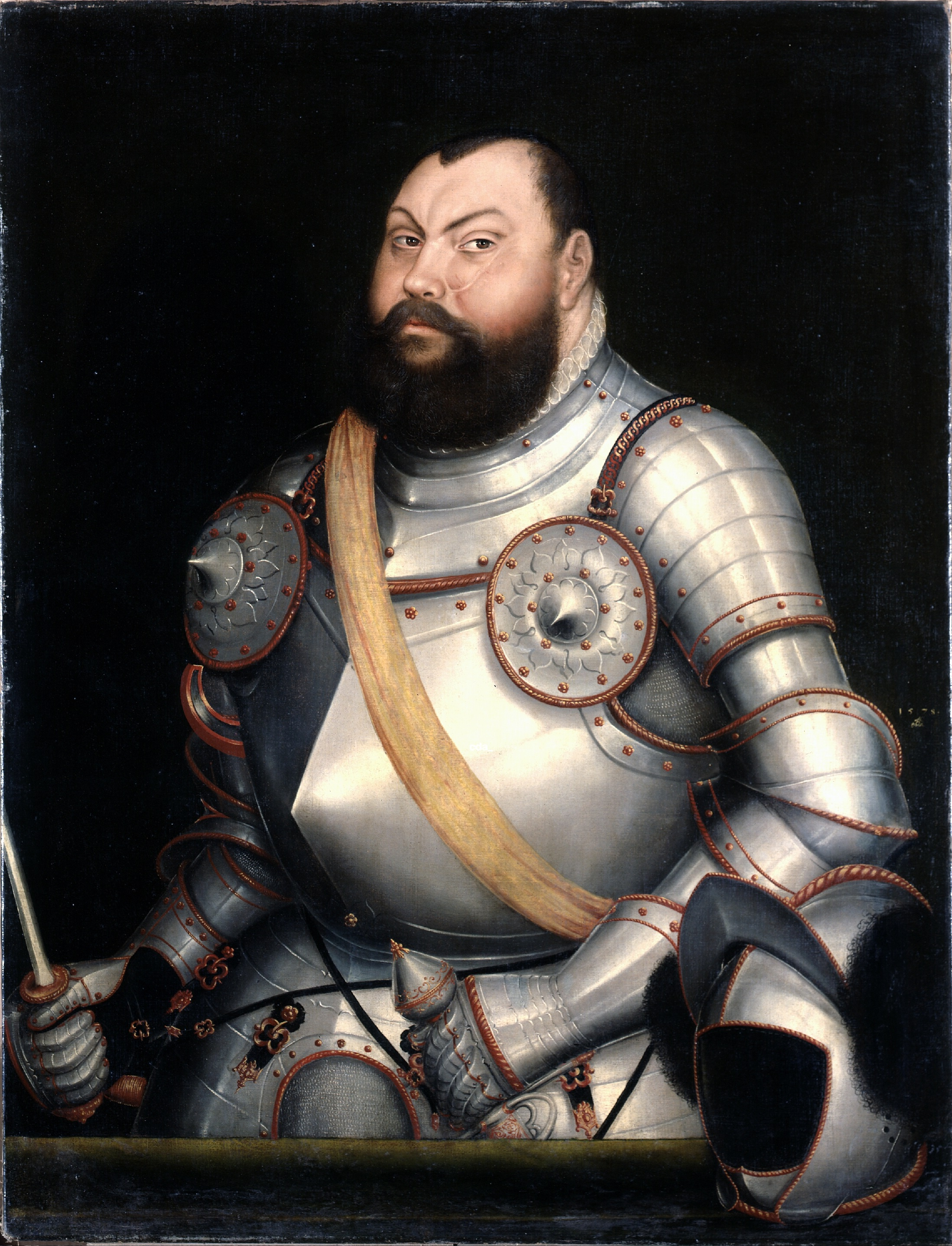
John Frederick I of Saxony by Lucas Cranach the Younger

In December 1535, the League admitted anyone who would subscribe to the Augsburg Confession, and Anhalt, Württemberg, Pomerania, as well as the free imperial cities of Augsburg, Frankfurt am Main, and the Free Imperial City of Kempten joined the alliance.

In 1538, the Schmalkaldic League allied with the newly reformed Denmark-Norway. In 1545, the League gained the allegiance of the Electoral Palatinate, under the control of Frederick III, Elector Palatine.

In 1544, Denmark-Norway and the Holy Roman Empire signed the Treaty of Speyer, which stated that during the reign of Christian III, Denmark-Norway would maintain a peaceful foreign policy towards the Holy Roman Empire. The league would also get limited support from Brandenburg under Joachim II Hector, but during the Schmalkaldic War he would send cavalry support to the Emperor against the league.

== Activities ==
The League's members agreed to provide 10,000 infantry and 2,000 cavalry for their mutual protection. They rarely provoked Charles directly but confiscated church land, expelled bishops and Catholic princes and helped spread Lutheranism throughout northern Germany.

Martin Luther planned to present to the League the Smalcald Articles, a stricter Protestant confession, during a meeting in 1537. He attended the critical meeting in 1537 but spent most of his time suffering from kidney stones. The rulers and princes even met in the home at which Luther was staying. Though Luther was asked to prepare the articles of faith that came to be known as the Smalcald Articles, they were not formally adopted at the time of the meeting, but in 1580, they were included in the Book of Concord.

== Political environment ==
For 15 years, the League existed without opposition because Charles was busy fighting wars with France and the Ottoman Empire. Overall, the Ottoman–Habsburg Wars lasted from 1526 to 1571.

In 1535, Francis I of France, despite vigorously persecuting Protestants at home, supported the Protestant princes in their struggle against their common foe, Charles. The tactical support ended in 1544 with the signing of the Treaty of Crépy in which the French king, who was fighting the Emperor in Italy, pledged to stop backing the Protestant princes and the League in Germany.

In 1535, Charles led the Conquest of Tunis. Francis, in an effort to limit the power of the Habsburgs, allied with Suleiman the Magnificent of the Ottoman Empire and formed a Franco-Ottoman alliance. The Italian War of 1536–38 between France and the Holy Roman Empire ended in 1538 with the Truce of Nice.

The final war during that period Charles fought against France, the Italian War of 1542–46, ended with inconclusive results and the Treaty of Crépy. After the peace with France, Charles signed the Truce of Adrianople in 1547 with the Ottoman Empire, which was allied to Francis, to free even more Habsburg resources for a final confrontation with the League.

== Schmalkaldic War ==
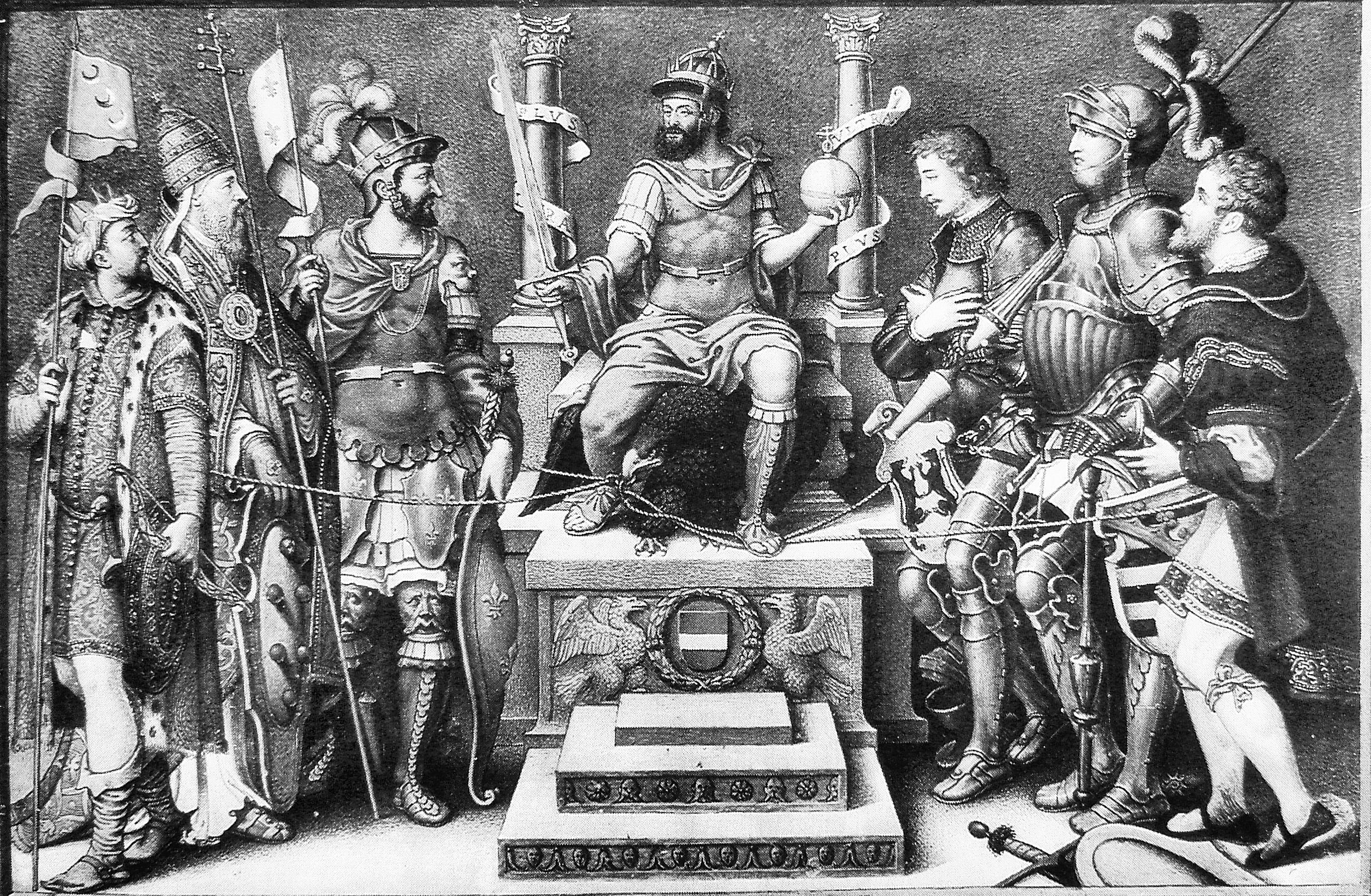
Charles V, enthroned over his defeated enemies (from left): Suleiman the Magnificent, Pope Clement VII, Francis I, the Duke of Cleves, the Landgrave of Hesse, and the Duke of Saxony. Giulio Clovio, mid-16th century.

After Charles made peace with Francis, he focused on suppressing Protestant resistance within his empire. From 1546 to 1547, in what is known as the Schmalkaldic War, Charles and his allies fought the League over the territories of Ernestine Saxony and Albertine Saxony. Although the League's military forces may have been superior, its leaders were incompetent and unable to agree on any definitive battle plans. Despite the fact that Pope Paul III withdrew his troops from the Imperial forces and halved his subsidy, on 24 April 1547, the imperial forces gathered by Charles routed the League's forces at the Battle of Mühlberg, capturing many leaders, including, most notably, Johann Frederick the Magnanimous. Philip of Hesse tried to negotiate, but the emperor refused, and Philip surrendered in May. In theory, that meant that the residents of thirty different cities were returned to Catholicism, but that was not the case. The battle effectively won the war for Charles; only two cities continued to resist. Many of the princes and key reformers, such as Martin Bucer, fled to England, where they directly influenced the English Reformation.

== Aftermath ==
In 1548, the victorious Charles forced the Schmalkaldic League to agree to the terms set forth in the Augsburg Interim.

A Protestant victory in the Second Schmalkaldic War in 1552 forced Charles to flee across the Alps to avoid capture; the heir Ferdinand (King of the Romans) signed the Peace of Passau, which granted some freedoms to Protestants and ended all of Charles' hopes of religious unity within his empire.

Three years later, the Peace of Augsburg granted Lutheranism official status within the Holy Roman Empire and let princes choose the official religion within the domains that they controlled, according to the principle of Cuius regio, eius religio.

== See also ==
- Other Protestant leagues:
  - League of Torgau (1526–1531), the earliest league of Protestant princes against the Catholic League of Dessau, succeeded by the Schmalkaldic League
  - Protestant Union (1608–1621), a league of Protestant states against the Catholic League
  - Heilbronn League (1633–1635), a league of western and southern Protestant German states under Swedish and French guidance
