= League of Torgau =

Short-lived 16th century alliance

The League of Torgau (German: Torgauer Bund) was an alliance of Lutheran princes, including Philip of Hesse and John of Saxony, which was formed 27 February 1526 to oppose the terms set forth in the Edict of Worms. Because it had no substantial military, it was unable to achieve religious or political influence. In 1531, the Schmalkaldic League, a similar alliance that included an army of 10,000 infantry and 2,000 cavalry, was formed. It lasted for sixteen years and was more successful in reaching its demands. The League of Torgau was set up soon after the 1526 Imperial Diet of Speyer.

== See also ==
- Other Protestant leagues:
  - Schmalkaldic League (1531-1546), a league of Protestant princes against the Holy Roman Emperor
  - Protestant Union (1608-1621), a league of Protestant states against the Catholic League
  - Heilbronn League (1633-1648), a league of western and southern Protestant German states under Swedish and French guidance
