= Johann Sperber =

Johann Sperber was Master of Waldau, near Kassel. He unexpectedly appeared on October 23, 1526, Tuesday, when the Synod of Homberg was on the point of closing. He made an attempt to justify the invocation of Mary, the mother of Jesus Christ, by the Angelical salutation in the first chapter of Luke.
