= League of Dessau =

Catholic alliance during the German Reformation

- The Protestant League of Torgau (purple) and the Catholic League of Dessau (yellow) in northern Germany
- Formation: 15 July 1525
- Founded at: Dessau, Anhalt-Dessau, Holy Roman Empire
- Members: List: Anhalt-Dessau; Electorate of Saxony; Margraviate of Brandenburg
- Leadership: Margaret of Münsterberg

The League of Dessau (also called the Alliance of Dessau; German: Dessauer Bund) was a short-lived association of Catholic rulers in northern Germany during the time of the German Reformation. Its goals were to suppress both the rebellion and the proliferation of Martin Luther's teachings. The League was founded in Dessau on 19 July 1525 and was led by the strictly Catholic widow and regent princess Margaret of Münsterberg.

== Background ==
The League was founded a few weeks after the Battle of Frankenhausen in Thuringia, where revolting peasants had been overpowered. This suggested to the Catholic sovereigns that a crackdown against Protestantism should be possible. Although she had a mostly friendly attitude towards Martin Luther himself, the princess feared a repeat of the peasant uprisings in her own country, so she convened the League, against the wishes of her sons.

Within Anhalt, the league was limited to the Principality of Anhalt-Dessau, because the neighbouring principalities of Anhalt-Köthen and Anhalt-Bernburg had converted to Lutheranism in 1525 and 1526, as the second and third countries in the world to do so, after the Electorate of Saxony. Anhalt-Dessau followed suit in 1534, under Margaret's son George III, well after Margaret's death in 1530.

== Effects ==
The Protestant Princes responded by forming the League of Torgau.

The League of Dessau did not have much effect. The League was unable to motivate the Catholic princes in the south of the Holy Roman Empire to join. During the First Diet of Speyer in 1526, followers of both faiths attempted to agree on a political compromise. The Edict of Worms was repealed. A decision was taken to tolerate the new faith until a Synod could resolve the religious differences.

== Members ==
Members of the alliance included:

- Duke George of Saxony
- Elector Joachim I Nestor of Brandenburg
- Archbishop Albert of Mainz and Magdeburg
- Duke Eric I of Brunswick-Calenberg-Göttingen
- Duke Henry II of Brunswick-Wolfenbüttel
