= Diet of Speyer (1529) =

Meeting of the deliberative body of the Holy Roman Empire

The Diet of Speyer or the Diet of Spires (sometimes referred to as Speyer II) was a Diet of the Holy Roman Empire held in 1529 in the Imperial City of Speyer (located in present-day Germany). The Diet condemned the results of the Diet of Speyer of 1526 and prohibited future reformation. It resulted in the Protestation at Speyer.

== Diet ==
The Diet of Speyer was convened in March 1529, for action against the Turks, whose armies were pressing forward in Hungary, and would besiege Vienna later in the year, and against the further progress of Protestantism.

The Diet opened on 15 March. The Catholic dignitaries appeared in full force, as did various princes and representatives of imperial cities who were leaning towards Luther and Zwingli's reforms. Ascendant Roman Catholic forces, particularly given Charles V's recent successes against the French in Italy, aimed to reverse the policy of religious tolerance adopted in 1526.

The meeting was not attended by Charles. He sent instructions to his regent, Ferdinand, to pursue a conciliatory line, but his advice did not reach his brother in time. Instead, Ferdinand read out his own far less conciliatory suggestions in Charles's name at the start of the Diet. Ferdinand condemned the way many princes had interpreted the recess issued at Speyer in 1526. He specifically denied them the right to choose which religious reforms would take effect in their states, and ordered that Catholicism be followed in all states of the Holy Roman Empire.

The Protestants felt that "Christ was again in the hands of Caiaphas and Pilate." The resultant recess of the Diet neutralized the recess of the preceding Diet of 1526; it virtually condemned (without, however, annulling) the innovations made; and it forbade, on pain of the imperial ban, any further reformation until the meeting of the council, which was now positively promised for the next year by the Emperor and the Pope. The Edict of Worms was therefore to be enforced after all, without waiting for a General Council. "All religious innovation must be halted and the jurisdiction of bishops restored." The Zwinglians and Anabaptists were excluded even from toleration. The latter were to be punished by death.

== Protestation ==
The Lutheran members of the Diet, under the well-founded impression that the prohibition of any future reformation meant death to the whole movement, entered, in the legal form of an appeal on behalf of themselves, their subjects and all Christians, a protest on 25 April 1529. They protested against all those measures of the Diet which they saw as contrary to the Word of God, to their conscience, and to the decision of the Diet of 1526, and appealed from the decision of the majority to the Emperor, to a general or German council, and impartial Christian judges. Lutherans "presented a protestatio, a protestation," which would label evangelicals as "Protestants". Their action created the term "Protestantism"—still used today as a name for this religious movement.

The document was signed by the Elector John of Saxony, Margrave George of Brandenburg, Dukes Ernest and Francis of Braunschweig-Luneburg, Landgrave Philip of Hesse, Prince Wolfgang of Anhalt, and the representatives of fourteen imperial cities, including Strassburg and St. Gall of the Zwinglian persuasion. They were determined to defend themselves against every act of violence of the majority. Their motto was that of Elector John the Constant: "The Word of God abideth forever." "The Speyer protestation created a separation that would not be overcome".
