= Margarethe von der Saale =

German noblewoman

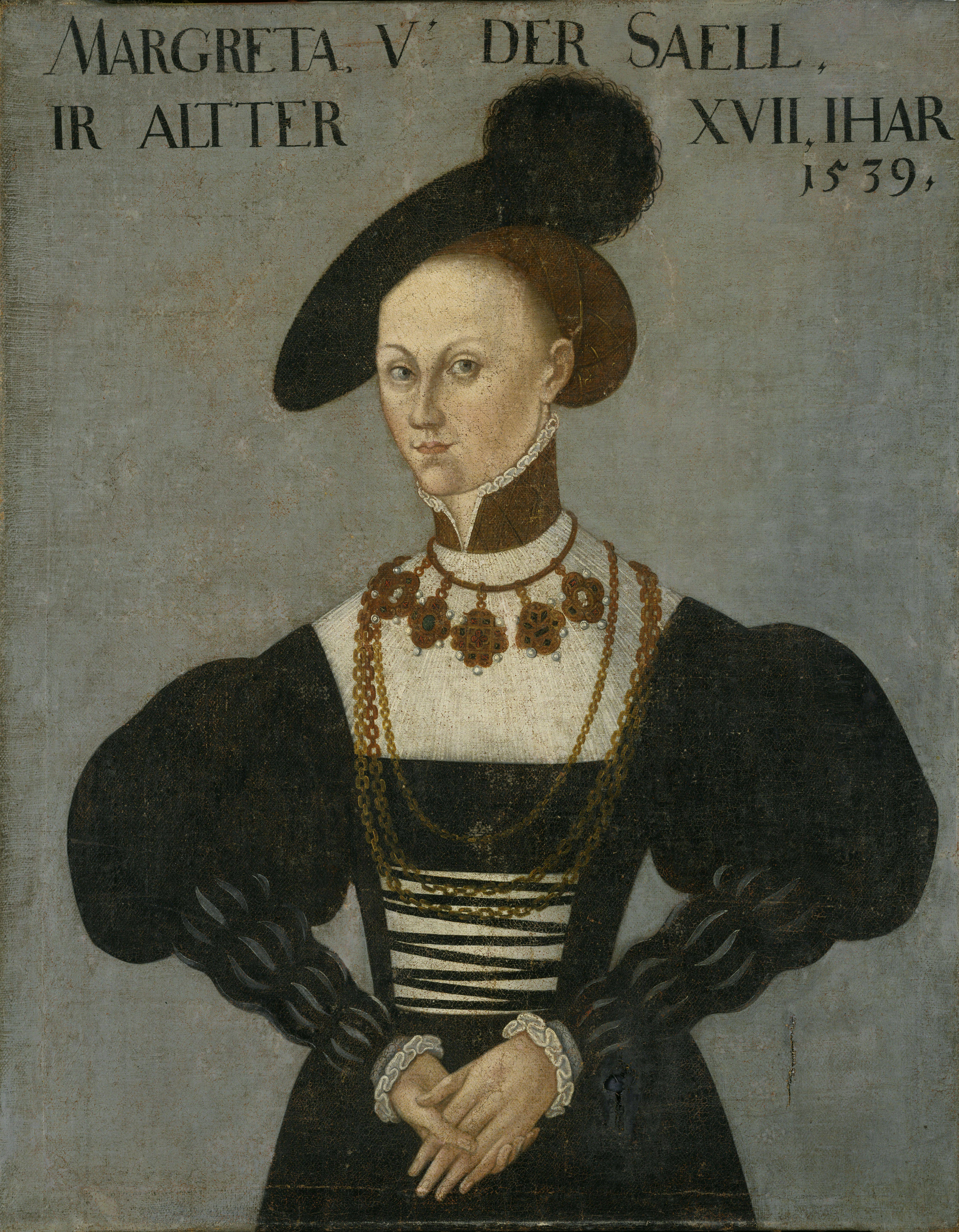
Portrait of Margarethe von der Saale (17th-century copy after an unknown artist)

Margarethe von der Saale (1522 – 6 July 1566) was a German noblewoman, lady-in-waiting and morganatic spouse by bigamy to Philip I, Landgrave of Hesse.

== Marriage ==
Born as daughter of Hans von der Saale and his wife, Anna von Miltitz. When she came to Hessian court to serve as lady in waiting, Margarethe met the married Landgrave Philip at the age of seventeen. Philip wished to marry von der Saale morganatically rather than keep her as a mistress, as adultery would blacken his religious reputation, but he did not wish to divorce his consort, Christine of Saxony, as he believed that a divorce was equally sinful. On 10 December 1539, he received support from Martin Luther, with the argument that of two evil things, bigamy was better than divorce. The bigamous wedding ceremony took place on 4 March 1540 in Rotenburg Castle in the presence of Martin Bucer and Philipp Melanchthon. Saale never attended court but resided in a house beside the square in Spangenberg.

The bigamy between Margarethe and Philip had a negative effect upon the Reformation.

== Children ==
1. Philipp, Count zu Dietz (12 March 1541 – 10 June 1569).
2. Hermann, Count zu Dietz (12 February 1542 – ca. 1568).
3. Christopher Ernst, Count zu Dietz (16 July 1543 – 20 April 1603).
4. Margaretha, Countess zu Dietz (14 October 1544 – 1608), married:
  1. in Kassel on 3 October 1567 to Count Hans Bernhard of Eberstein;
  2. in Frauenberg on 10 August 1577 to Count Stephan Heinrich of Everstein.
5. Albrecht, Count zu Dietz (10 March 1546 – 3 October 1569).
6. Philipp Konrad, Count zu Dietz (29 September 1547 – 25 May 1569).
7. Moritz, Count zu Dietz (8 June 1553 – 23 January 1575).
8. Ernst, Count zu Dietz (12 August 1554 – 1570).
9. Anna (1557 – 2/5 January 1558), died in infancy.

== See also ==
- Elisabeth Helene von Vieregg
- Sophie von Dönhoff
