= Honius =

Dutch jurist

Honius, born Colen Henrik Hoen (c. 1440, in The Hague – 1524, in The Hague) was a Dutch jurist and humanist, known for his views on the Eucharist.
