= Christine of Saxony =

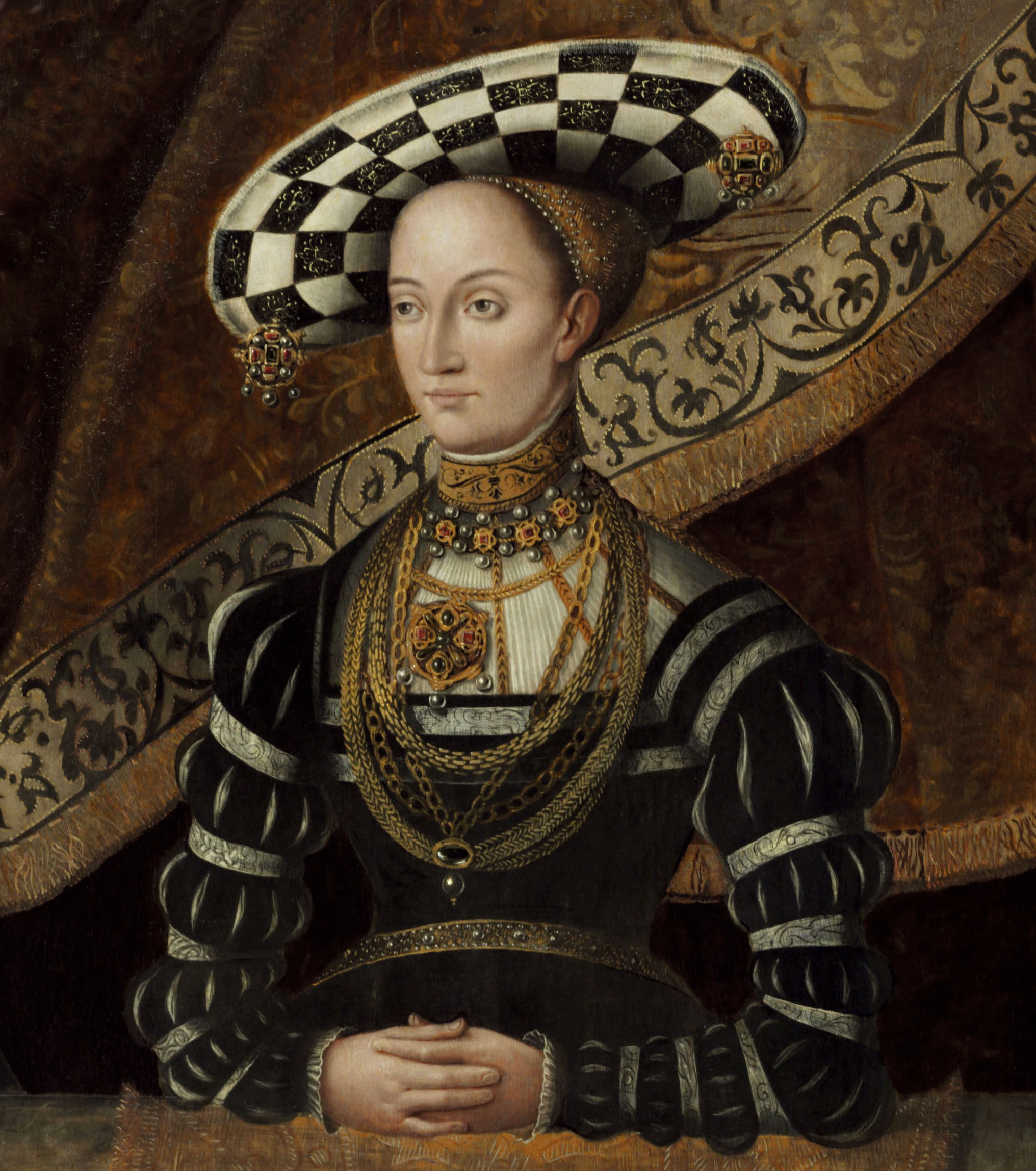
- Portrait c. 1585–1590

Landgravine consort of Hesse
- Tenure: 11 December 1523 – 15 April 1549
- Born: 25 December 1505; Dresden, Electorate of Saxony, Holy Roman Empire
- Died: 15 April 1549 (aged 43); Kassel, Landgraviate of Hesse, Holy Roman Empire
- Spouse: Philip I, Landgrave of Hesse (m. 1523)
- Issue: Agnes, Electress of Saxony; Anna, Countess Palatine of Zweibrücken; William IV, Landgrave of Hesse-Kassel; Philipp Ludwig; Barbara, Duchess of Württemberg-Mömpelgard; Louis IV, Landgrave of Hesse-Marburg; Elisabeth, Electress Palatine; Philip II, Landgrave of Hesse-Rheinfels; Christine, Duchess of Holstein-Gottorp; George I, Landgrave of Hesse-Darmstadt
- House: Wettin
- Father: George, Duke of Saxony
- Mother: Barbara Jagiellon

Christine of Saxony (25 December 1505 – 15 April 1549) was a German noblewoman, landgravine consort of Hesse by her marriage to Philip I, Landgrave of Hesse. She was the regent of Hesse during the absence of her husband from 1547 to 1549.

== Life ==
She was a daughter of George, Duke of Saxony and Barbara Jagiellon. She married Philip I, Landgrave of Hesse on 11 December 1523 in Kassel. The marriage was arranged to forge a political alliance between Hesse and Saxony and was unhappy. Philip claimed to be disgusted by her and the "sexual wasteland" of his arranged marriage, said that he only shared her bed by duty and stated that she drank too much. Christine was nevertheless frequently pregnant; she gave birth to ten children in twenty years, nine of whom lived to adulthood.

Whilst married to Christine, Philip had adulterous affairs from as early as 1526 and even practised bigamy. He had another nine children with his other (morganatic) wife, Margarethe von der Saale, one of his sister’s ladies-in-waiting. In 1540, Christine gave her consent to her husband's bigamy with his lover in writing as long as any children had an inferior status, but it was politically disadvantageous and had a negative effect upon the Protestant Reformation. Margarethe von der Saale was never seen at court and her children were barred from any claim to the landgraviate and from inheriting their fathers lands.

During Philip's absence and captivity under Imperial arrest from 1547 to 1549, Christine was regent jointly with her oldest son. She died before Philip's release in 1552.

== Depictions ==
Lead glazed earthenware stove tiles of Phillip and Christine were excavated in Haapsalu, Estonia, and are held in the collection of the Läänemaa Museum.

== Children with Philip of Hesse ==
1. Agnes of Hesse (31 May 1527 – 4 November 1555), married:
  1. in Marburg on 9 January 1541 to Maurice, Elector of Saxony;
  2. in Weimar on 26 May 1555 to John Frederick II, Duke of Saxe-Gotha.
2. Anna of Hesse (26 October 1529 – 10 July 1591), married on 24 February 1544 to Wolfgang, Count Palatine of Zweibrücken.
3. William IV of Hesse-Kassel (or Hesse-Cassel) (24 June 1532 – 25 August 1592).
4. Philipp Ludwig (29 June 1534 – 31 August 1535), died in infancy.
5. Barbara of Hesse (8 April 1536 – 8 June 1597), married:
  1. in Reichenweier on 10 September 1555 to Duke George I of Württemberg-Mömpelgard;
  2. in Kassel on 11 November 1568 to Count Daniel of Waldeck.
6. Louis IV of Hesse-Marburg (27 May 1537 – 9 October 1604).
7. Elisabeth of Hesse (13 February 1539 – 14 March 1582), married on 8 July 1560 to Louis VI, Elector Palatine.
8. Philip II of Hesse-Rheinfels (22 April 1541 – 20 November 1583).
9. Christine of Hesse (29 June 1543 – 13 May 1604), married in Gottorp on 17 December 1564 to Adolf, Duke of Holstein-Gottorp.
10. Georg I of Hesse-Darmstadt (10 September 1547 – 7 February 1596).

== Ancestry ==
Ancestors of Christine of Saxony

8. Frederick II, Elector of Saxony
4. Albert III, Duke of Saxony
9. Margaret of Austria, Electress of Saxony
2. George, Duke of Saxony
10. George of Poděbrady
5. Sidonie of Poděbrady
11. Kunigunde of Sternberg
1. Christine of Saxony
12. Władysław II Jagiełło
6. Casimir IV Jagiellon
13. Sophia of Halshany
3. Barbara Jagiellon
14. Albert II of Germany
7. Elisabeth of Austria
15. Elizabeth of Luxembourg
