= Philip II of Hesse-Rheinfels =

Philip II
- Landgrave of Hesse-Rheinfels
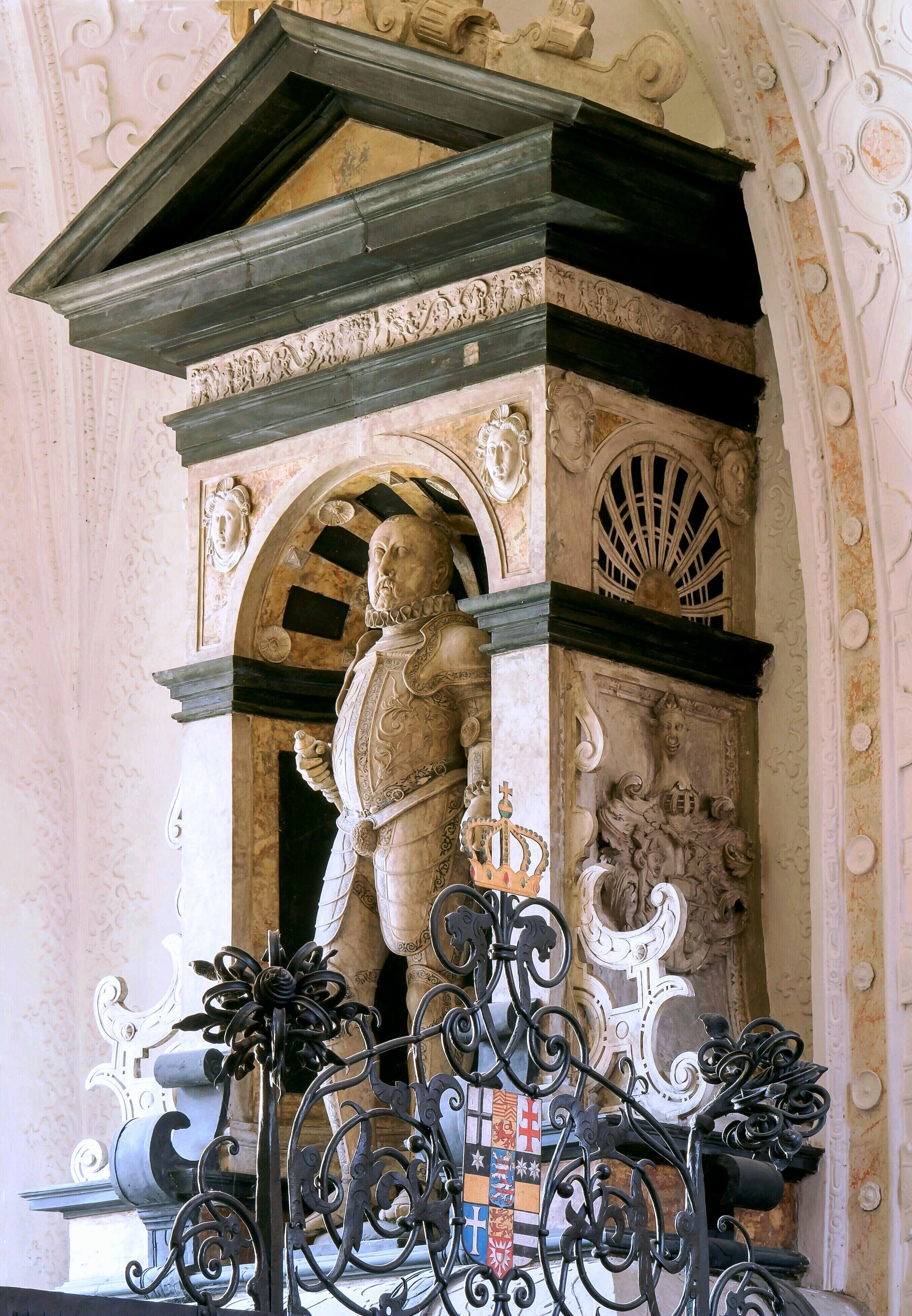
- Funerary monument of Philipp II in the Stiftskirche St. Goar
- Born: 1541; Marburg
- Died: 30 November 1583 (aged 41–42); Schloß Rheinfels
- Noble family: House of Hesse-Rheinfels
- Spouse: Anna Elisabeth of Palatinate-Simmern
- Father: Philip I, Landgrave of Hesse
- Mother: Christine of Saxony

Philip II of Hesse-Rheinfels (1541, Marburg – 30 November 1583), also called Philip the Younger, was the first Landgrave of Hesse-Rheinfels.

== Biography ==
Philip was the third son of Landgrave Philip the Magnanimous and Christine of Saxony (1505–1549). After his father's death in 1567, the Landgraviate of Hesse was divided among the four sons from the late landgrave's first marriage.

Philip the Younger received the portion around the Rheinfels Castle and city of St. Goar on the left bank of the Rhine. The county consisted mainly of the former Lower County of Katzenelnbogen with its four Ämter Rheinfels (with the city of St. Goar and the residence Rheinfels Castle) on the left bank of the Rhine, and Braubach, Reichenberg and Hohenstein on the right bank.

== Private life ==
In 1569 Philip married Anna Elisabeth of Palatinate-Simmern (1549–1609), thereby becoming the son-in-law of the Elector Frederick III, one of the leaders of Calvinism. The marriage remained childless.

== Death ==
Philip died on 30 November 1583 at Schloß Rheinfels. As his marriage had remained childless, his territory fell to his elder brother Wilhelm IV, Landgrave of Hesse-Kassel (or Hesse-Cassel). Philip was buried in St. Goar, where Wilhelm erected an imposing Renaissance monument.

== Ancestors ==
Ancestors of Philip II of Hesse-Rheinfels

8. Louis II, Landgrave of Hesse
4. William II, Landgrave of Hesse
9. Matilda of Württemberg-Urach
2. Philip I, Landgrave of Hesse
10. Magnus II, Duke of Mecklenburg-Schwerin and Güstrow
5. Anna of Mecklenburg-Schwerin
11. Sophie of Pomerania-Wolgast
1. Philip II, Landgrave of Hesse-Rheinfels
12. Albert III, Duke of Saxony
6. George, Duke of Saxony
13. Sidonie of Poděbrady
3. Christine of Saxony
14. Casimir IV Jagiellon
7. Barbara Jagiellon
15. Elisabeth of Austria
