= Otto von Pack =

Otto von Pack (c. 1480 – 8 February 1537) was a German conspirator.

== Life ==
He studied at the University of Leipzig, and obtained a responsible position under George, Duke of Saxony, which he lost owing to his dishonesty. In 1528, he revealed to Philip, Landgrave of Hesse, the details of a scheme agreed upon in Breslau by the archduke Ferdinand, afterwards the emperor Ferdinand I, and other influential princes, to conquer Hungary for Ferdinand and then to attack the reformers in Germany.

Pack was sent to Hungary to concert joint measures with John Zapolya, the opponent of Ferdinand in that country, but John, Elector of Saxony, advised that the associates of Ferdinand should be asked to explain their conduct, and Pack's revelations were discovered to be false; the copy of the treaty which he had shown to Philip proving to be a forgery.

For some time, Pack lived the life of a fugitive, finally reaching the Netherlands, where he was seized at the request of Duke George. Examined under torture, he admitted the forgery, and the government of the Netherlands passed sentence of death, which was carried out on 8 February 1537. This affair has given rise to an acute controversy whether Philip of Hesse was himself deceived by Pack, or was his assistant in concocting the scheme.
