= Diet of Speyer (1526) =

Imperial Diet (general assembly) of the Holy Roman Empire

The Diet of Speyer or the Diet of Spires (sometimes referred to as Speyer I) was an Imperial Diet of the Holy Roman Empire in 1526 in the Imperial City of Speyer in present-day Germany. The Diet's edict, in summary, denoted the consensus that an agreement regarding the Diet of Worms could not be obtained, and that each city and territory was independent from the authority of the empire, resulted in a temporary suspension of the Edict of Worms and aided the expansion of Protestantism. Those results were repudiated in the Diet of Speyer (1529).

== Cause ==
As the reform movement advanced, the execution of the Edict of Worms (1521), an edict by Charles V outlawing Martin Luther and all his writings with death sentences and confiscatory penalties for anyone, such as a printer, who was found with them in their possession, became less and less practicable. Attempts had been made to enforce the Edict of Worms by two Diets of Nuremberg in 1522 and 1524, but both failed. That was also manifest at the imperial Diet of Speyer, held in the summer of 1526. Although the Holy Roman Emperor, Charles V, had originally intended to attend this meeting, commitments in the rest of his territories forced him to cancel his visit. Instead, the Diet was held under Archduke Ferdinand I of Austria in the name of his older brother, the Emperor. Ferdinand was instructed to bring both sides together.

The Protestant princes dared for the first time to profess their faith and were greatly strengthened by the delegates of the Imperial cities in which the Reformation had made great progress. Both the threatening invasion of the Ottoman Empire and the quarrel of the Emperor with the Pope favoured the Protestant cause and inclined the Catholic majority to forbearance.

The buildup to the Diet was also marked by the gradual emergence of various groupings of princes along the lines of religion. Most notably, John, Elector of Saxony and Philip of Hesse formed a League at Gotha, which they then concluded at Torgau in February 1526, thus forming the League of Torgau.

== Proceedings ==
As always for Diet host towns, accommodations and provisions for several thousand guests (the elector of Saxony alone traveling with 700 guests and 400 horses) were a challenge for the council, inhabitants and landlords. On the other hand, such events provided a town with considerable earnings. After the grand opening on 25 June 1526, with processions of princes and envoys to the cathedral and the ceremonious high mass, the Diet continued for two months.

Charles's proposals for the diet asked for the Edict of Worms to be carried out, heresy and rebellion to be put down and any final decisions on religion to be postponed until the meeting of a general council. The princes, however, managed to negotiate some very different conclusions to the Diet.

== Decisions ==
On 27 August, the Diet came to the unanimous conclusion, with the consent of Ferdinand, that a general or national council should be convened for the settlement of the church question and that in the meantime, in matters concerning the Edict of Worms, "every State shall so live, rule, and believe as it may hope and trust to answer before God and his imperial Majesty". That action was not designed to annul the Edict of Worms nor to be a permanent law of religious liberty to give to each member of the Diet the right to act as he pleased. Rather, it was merely an armistice, or a temporary suspension of the edict, until the meeting of a general council and within the limits of obedience to the Catholic emperor, who had no plans to grant religious liberty or even toleration to Protestants.

However, in its practical effects, the resolution of 1526 went far beyond its intention. It was a great help to the cause of Protestantism, especially as the council, which the diet contemplated and the Emperor himself repeatedly urged upon the Pope, was postponed for 20 years. In the meantime, the Protestant princes, notably Philip of Hesse at the Synod of Homberg (20 October 1526) and Elector John of Saxony interpreted the decree according to their own wishes and made the best use of the temporary privilege of independent action, regardless of its limitations or the views of the Emperor. Luther himself understood the Diet of Speyer as having given him a temporary reprieve on the charge of heresy.

In a separate set of decisions, the Diet also decided that the Imperial Regiment and the Imperial Chamber Court (Reichskammergericht), next to the Emperor the highest ranking wielders of state power in the Holy Roman Empire, were to be moved to Speyer the following year.

== Aftermath ==
Emperor Charles V neither signed nor opposed the Edict of Speyer. He had shortly earlier fallen out with Pope Clement VII, who had released King Francis I of France from the hard conditions of peace imposed upon him after his defeat at Pavia on 24 February 1525 and had, on 22 May 1526, placed himself at the head of a Franco-Italian league, the League of Cognac, against the preponderance of Austria. The combination of the Emperor and the Pope had brought about the Edict of Worms. The breach between them virtually annulled it at the Diet of Speyer. Had the Emperor then embraced the Protestant doctrines, he might have become the head of a German imperial state church, but his instincts were all against Protestantism, and his kingdoms of Spain and the Sicilies would have revolted against him.

The action of the Diet of 1526 and the quarrel between the Emperor and the Pope, were highly favourable to the progress of the Reformation, but the good effect was in great part neutralised by a stupendous fraud, which brought Germany to the brink of a civil war.

Philip of Hesse, an ardent, passionate, impulsive and ambitious prince who was a patron of Protestantism, was deceived by an unprincipled and avaricious politician, Otto von Pack, the provisional chancellor of the Duchy of Saxony, into the belief that Ferdinand of Austria, the Electors of Mainz, Brandenburg and Saxony, the Duke of Bavaria and other Catholic rulers had concluded a league at Breslau, on 15 May 1527, for the extermination of Protestantism. He procured at Dresden a sealed copy of the forged document for which he paid Pack four thousand guilders. He persuaded Elector John of Saxony of its genuineness and concluded with him, in all haste, a counterleague on 9 March 1528. They secured aid from other princes and made expensive military preparations in anticipation of an attack by the enemy.

Fortunately, the reformers of Wittenberg were consulted, and an open outbreak of hostilities was prevented by their advice. Martin Luther deemed the papal forces capable of anything but was on principle opposed to aggressive war. Philip Melanchthon saw through the forgery and felt keenly mortified. When the fictitious document was published, the Catholic princes indignantly denied it. Duke George denounced Pack as a traitor. Archduke Ferdinand declared that he never dreamed of such a league.

The rash conduct of Philip put the Protestant princes in the position of aggressors and disturbers of the public peace, and the whole affair brought shame and disgrace upon their cause.

The Diet of Speyer 1529 virtually condemned the innovations made but did not annul them. The Protestation at Speyer occurred at the 1529 Diet and gave rise to the term "Protestants".

== Significance ==
The exercise of territorial sovereignty dates from then as well as the establishment of separate state churches in the German states of the Holy Roman Empire. Since the Empire was divided into a large number of sovereign states, there were as many Protestant church organisations as Protestant states, according to the maxim that "the ruler of the territory is the ruler of religion within its bounds" (cuius regio, eius religio).

Every Protestant prince claimed and exercised the so-called jus reformandi religionem (the right to reform religion) and decided the church question according to his own faith and that of the majority of his subjects. Saxony, Hesse, Prussia, Anhalt, Lüneburg, East Friesland, Schleswig-Holstein, Silesia, and the cities of Nuremberg, Augsburg, Frankfurt, Ulm, Strasburg, Bremen, Hamburg, and Lübeck, adopted Protestantism. The princes of the territories and the magistrates of the cities consulted the theologians and preachers. The powerful House of Austria, with the Emperor, and the Dukes of Bavaria, adhered to the old faith and hotly contested the principle of independent state action on the church question as being contrary to all the traditions of the Empire and of the Roman Church.

The Protestant princes and theologians prohibited the Mass and certain other Roman practices wherever they held power. Each party was bent upon victory and granted toleration only from necessity or prudence when the dissenting minority was strong enough to assert its rights. Toleration was the fruit of a bitter contest and was at last forced upon both parties as a modus vivendi. Protestantism had to conquer the right to exist by terrible sacrifices. The right was conceded by the Peace of Augsburg in 1555 and finally established by the Peace of Westphalia in 1648, which first uses the term "toleration" in connection with religion and remains valid in spite of the protest of the Pope. The same policy of toleration was adopted in England after the downfall of the Stuart dynasty in 1688 and included all orthodox Protestants but excluded the Catholics, who were not emancipated until 1829. In Germany, toleration was first confined to three confessions (Catholic, Lutheran and German Reformed) but was gradually extended to other religious communions, which are independent of state support and state control.
