= Francis Lambert =

Protestant church reformer (born 1486 – 1530)

Francis Lambert (c. 1486 – April 8, 1530) was a Protestant reformer, the son of a papal official at Avignon, where he was born between 1485 and 1487.

At the age of 15 he entered the Franciscan monastery at Avignon, and after 1517 he was an itinerant preacher, travelling through France, Italy and Switzerland. Lambert's study of the Scriptures shook his faith in Roman Catholic theology, and by 1522 he had abandoned his order, and became known to the leaders of the Reformation in Switzerland and Germany. He did not, however, identify himself either with Zwinglianism or Lutheranism; he debated with Huldrych Zwingli at Zürich in 1522, and then made his way to Eisenach and Wittenberg, where he married in 1523.

Lambert arrived in Strasbourg in 1524, anxious to spread the doctrines of the Reformation among the French-speaking population of the city. The Germans mistrusted him, and in 1526 his activities were prohibited by the city. He was, however, befriended by Jacob Sturm, who recommended him to the Landgraf Philip of Hesse, the most liberal of the German reforming princes. With Philip's encouragement he drafted the scheme of ecclesiastical reform for which he is known.

Its basis was essentially democratic and congregational, though it provided for the government of the whole church by means of a synod. Pastors were to be elected by the congregation, and the whole system of canon-law was repudiated. This scheme was submitted by Philip to a synod at Homberg; but Martin Luther intervened and persuaded the Landgraf to abandon it. The plan was far too democratic to commend itself to the Lutherans, who had by this time bound the Lutheran cause to the support of princes rather than to that of the people.

Philip continued to favor Lambert, who was appointed professor and head of the theological faculty in the Landgraf's new University of Marburg. Patrick Hamilton, the Scottish martyr, was one of his pupils; and it was at Lambert's instigation that Hamilton composed his Loci communes, or Patrick's Pleas as they were popularly called in Scotland. Lambert was also one of the divines who took part in the great conference of Marburg in 1529; he had long wavered between the Lutheran and the Zwinglian view of the Lord's Supper, but at this conference he definitely adopted the Zwinglian view.

Lambert died of the plague on April 8, 1530, and was buried at Marburg.

A catalogue of Lambert's writings is given in the brothers Eugène and Émile Haag's La France protestante.
