= Philip I of Hesse =

Philip I
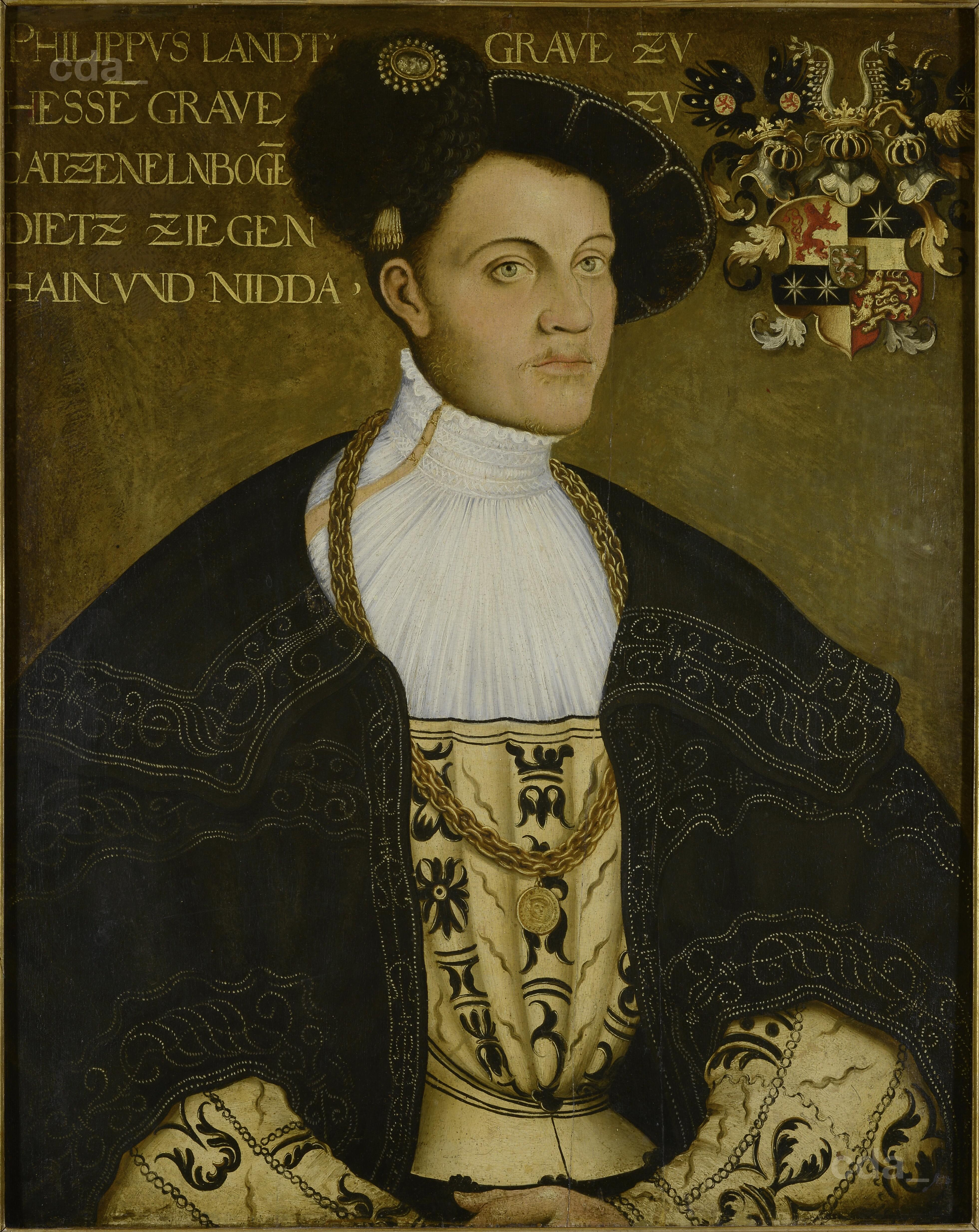
- Portrait by Hans Krell, 1534

Landgrave of Hesse
- Reign: 11 July 1509 – 31 March 1567
- Predecessor: William II
- Successor: William IV (Hesse-Kassel); Louis IV (Hesse-Marburg); Philip II (Hesse-Rheinfels); George I (Hesse-Darmstadt)
- Born: 13 November 1504; Marburg, Landgraviate of Hesse, Holy Roman Empire
- Died: 31 March 1567 (aged 62); Kassel, Landgraviate of Hesse, Holy Roman Empire
- Spouse: Christine of Saxony (m. 1523; died 1549) Margarethe von der Saale (m. 1540; died 1566)
- Issue: Agnes, Electress of Saxony, then Duchess of Saxony; Anna, Countess Palatine of Zweibrücken; William IV, Landgrave of Hesse-Kassel; Philipp Ludwig; Barbara, Countess of Württemberg-Mömpelgard, then Countess of Waldeck; Louis IV, Landgrave of Hesse-Marburg; Elisabeth, Electress Palatine; Philip II, Landgrave of Hesse-Rheinfels; Christine, Duchess of Holstein-Gottorp; George I, Landgrave of Hesse-Darmstadt; Philipp, Count of Dietz; Hermann, Count of Dietz; Christopher Ernst, Count of Dietz; Margretha, Countess of Dietz; Albrecht, Count of Dietz; Philipp Konrad, Count of Dietz; Moritz, Count of Dietz; Ernst, Count of Dietz; Anna, Countess of Dietz
- House: House of Hesse
- Father: William II, Landgrave of Hesse
- Mother: Anna of Mecklenburg-Schwerin
- Religion: Lutheran (since 1524); Roman Catholic (until 1524)
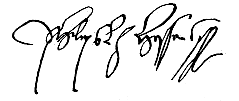
- Signature

Philip I, Landgrave of Hesse (13 November 1504 – 31 March 1567), nicknamed der Großmütige (lit. 'the Magnanimous'), was a German nobleman and a champion of the Protestant Reformation, notable for being one of the most important of the early Protestant rulers in Germany. He was also one of the main belligerents in the War of the Katzenelnbogen Succession.

== Biography ==
=== Early life and embracing of Protestantism ===
Philip was the son of Landgrave William II of Hesse and his second wife Anna of Mecklenburg-Schwerin. His father died when Philip was five years old, and in 1514 his mother, after a series of struggles with the Estates of Hesse, succeeded in becoming regent on his behalf. The struggles over authority continued, however. To put an end to them, Philip was declared of age in 1518, his actual assumption of power beginning the following year. The power of the Estates had been broken by his mother, but he owed her little else. His education had been very imperfect, and his moral and religious training had been neglected. Despite all this, he developed rapidly as a statesman, and soon began to take steps to increase his personal authority as a ruler.

The first meeting of Philip of Hesse with Martin Luther took place in 1521, at the age of 17, at the Diet of Worms. There he was attracted by Luther's personality, though he had at first little interest in the religious elements of the gathering. Philip embraced Protestantism in 1524 after a personal meeting with the theologian Philipp Melanchthon. He then helped suppress the German Peasants' War by defeating Thomas Müntzer at the Battle of Frankenhausen.

Philip refused to be drawn into the anti-Lutheran league of George, Duke of Saxony, in 1525. By his alliance with John, Elector of Saxony, concluded in Gotha on 27 February 1526, he showed that he was already taking steps to organize a protective alliance of all Protestant princes and powers. At the same time, he united political motives with his religious policy. As early as the spring of 1526, he sought to prevent the election of the Catholic Archduke Ferdinand as Holy Roman Emperor. At the Diet of Speyer in the same year, Philip openly championed the Protestant cause, rendering it possible for Protestant preachers to propagate their views while the Diet was in session, and, like his followers, openly disregarding ordinary Roman Catholic ecclesiastical usages.

=== Introduction of the Reformation in Hesse ===
Although there was no strong popular movement for Protestantism in Hesse, Philip determined to organize the church there according to Protestant principles. In this he was aided not only by his chancellor, the humanist Johann Feige, and his chaplain, Adam Krafft, but also by the ex-Franciscan François Lambert of Avignon, a staunch enemy of the faith he had left. While the radical policy of Lambert, embodied in the Homberg church order, was abandoned, at least in part, the monasteries and religious foundations were dissolved and their property was applied to charitable and scholastic purposes. The University of Marburg was founded in the summer of 1527 to be, like the University of Wittenberg, a school for Protestant theologians.

Philip's father-in-law George, Duke of Saxony, the bishop of Würzburg, Konrad II von Thungen, and the archbishop of Mainz, Albert III of Brandenburg, were active in agitating against the growth of the Reformation. Their activities, along with other circumstances, including rumors of war, convinced Philip of the existence of a secret league among the Roman Catholic princes. His suspicions were confirmed to his own satisfaction by a forgery given him by an adventurer who had been employed in important missions by George of Saxony, one Otto von Pack. After meeting with Elector John of Saxony in Weimar on 9 March 1528, it was agreed that the Protestant princes should take the offensive in order to protect their territories from invasion and capture.

Both Luther and the elector's chancellor, Gregor Brück, though convinced of the existence of the conspiracy, counseled strongly against acting on the offensive. The imperial authorities at Speyer now forbade all breach of the peace, and, after long negotiations, Philip succeeded in extorting the expenses for his armament from the dioceses of Würzburg, Bamberg, and Mainz, the latter bishopric also being compelled to recognize the validity of ecclesiastical jurisdiction in Hessian and Saxon territory until the Holy Roman Emperor or a Christian council should decide to the contrary.

Political conditions were nonetheless very unfavorable to Philip, who might easily be charged with disturbing the peace of the empire, and at the Second Diet of Speyer, in the spring of 1529, he was publicly ignored by Emperor Charles V. Nevertheless, he took an active part in uniting the Protestant representatives, as well as in preparing the celebrated Protestation at Speyer. Before leaving the city he succeeded in forming, on 22 April 1529, a secret understanding between Saxony, Hesse, Nuremberg, Strasburg, and Ulm.

=== Suspected of Zwinglianism ===
Philip was especially anxious to prevent division over the subject of the Eucharist. Through him Huldrych Zwingli was invited to Germany, and Philip thus prepared the way for the celebrated Marburg Colloquy. Although the attitude of the Wittenberg theologians frustrated his attempts to bring about harmonious relations, and although the situation was further complicated by the position of Georg, Margrave of Brandenburg-Ansbach, who demanded a uniform confession and a uniform church order, Philip held that the differences between the followers of Martin Bucer and the followers of Luther in their sacramental theories admitted honest disagreement, and that Holy Scripture could not resolve the differences definitively.

The result was that Philip was suspected of a tendency toward Zwinglianism. His sympathy for the Reformers associated with Zwingli in Switzerland and Bucer in Strasburg was intensified by the anger of the emperor at receiving from Philip a statement of Protestant tenets composed by the ex-Franciscan Lambert, and the landgrave's failure to secure any common action on the part of the Protestant powers regarding the approaching Turkish war. Philip eagerly embraced Zwingli's plan of a great Protestant alliance to extend from the Adriatic to Denmark to keep the Holy Roman Emperor from crossing into Germany. This association caused some coldness between himself and the followers of Luther at the Diet of Augsburg in 1530, especially when he propounded his irenic policy to Melanchthon and urged that all Protestants should stand together in demanding that a general council alone should decide religious differences. This was supposed to be indicative of Zwinglianism, and Philip soon found it necessary to explain his exact position on the question of the Eucharist, whereupon he declared that he fully agreed with the Lutherans, but disapproved of persecuting the Swiss.

The arrival of the emperor put an end to these disputes for the time being. But when Charles V demanded that the Protestant representatives should take part in the procession of Corpus Christi, and that Protestant preaching should cease in the city, Philip bluntly refused to obey. He now sought in vain to secure a modification of the tenth article of the Augsburg Confession, but when the position of the Upper Germans was officially rejected, Philip left the Diet directing his representatives manfully to uphold the Protestant position, and to keep general, not particular, interests constantly in view. At this time he offered Luther a refuge in his own territories and began to cultivate close relations with Martin Bucer, whose understanding of political questions created a common bond of sympathy between them. Moreover, Bucer fully agreed with the landgrave on the importance of compromise measures in treating the controversy surrounding the Eucharist.

=== Leader of the Schmalkaldic League ===
The German prince's Evangelical interpretation of "cuius regio, eius religio" ("Whose realm, his religion" ) at the Diet of Speyer in 1526, gave the Landgrave authority to garner enough political support to start a war effort, or at least a defensive effort. This effort resulted in the foundation of: the League of Gotha, then the League of Torgau, and finally the Schmalkaldic League. The Holy Roman Empire's elector John of Saxony, Philip's most powerful ally, agreed to, "oppose the terms of the Edict of Worms, which outlawed Martin Luther and demanded his punishment as a heretic". The Schmalkaldic League assumed the role of protectors of Protestant lands, the members of which were formally recognized in the First Agreement of the Schmalkaldic League in 1531.

In 1531 Philip was successful in accomplishing the purpose for which he had so long worked by securing the adhesion of the Protestant powers to the Schmalkaldic League, which was to protect their religious and secular interests against interference from the Emperor. The landgrave and his ally, John, Elector of Saxony, became recognized leaders of this union of German princes and cities. Philip was thoroughly convinced that the Protestant cause depended on weakening the power of the Habsburg emperors both at home and abroad.

Before engaging in hostilities, Philip attempted to achieve the goals of Protestant policy by peaceful means. He proposed a compromise on the subject of confiscated church property, but at the same time he was untiring in preparing for a possible recourse to war and cultivated diplomatic relations with any and all powers whom he knew to have anti-Habsburg interests. A peaceful turn came when arrangements were made with the Emperor at Nuremberg on 25 July 1532, but this did not prevent Philip from preparing for a future struggle.

Philip was untiring in his attempts to draw new allies into the league against Charles V and the Archduke Ferdinand I of Austria, who had been invested with the Duchy of Württemberg. The Battle of Lauffen on 13 May 1534 cost Ferdinand his newly acquired possession and caused Philip to be recognized as the hero of the day in Protestant Germany; his victory was viewed as the victory of the Schmalkaldic League. The war to capture Wuerttemberg cost Philip upwards of half a million florins, which turned out to be the most costly of his campaigns. After consulting a host of possible investors in Philip's War, Philip raised: "21,000 fl. from Conrad Joham, February, 1543 -- 10,000 fl. From the civic regime April, 1534 – 10,000 fl. From the civic regime, June 24, 1534 – 5,000 fl. From the Great Hospital" The sum proved not to be enough to hold off the multi-ethnic Imperial hordes, backed by Genoese banks, Papal reserves, and subsidies collected from the Low Countries. In the years following, this coalition became one of the most important factors in European politics, largely through the influence of Philip, who lost no opportunity in furthering the Protestant cause. Its alliance was sought by both France and England; it was extended for a period of ten years with The Constitution of the Smalkaldic League, December 23, 1535; and new members were added to it for the cause; "To begin with and first of all, this constitution shall have no other purpose, form, or intent than to provide defense and repulsion [of attack] and to keep ourselves and our subjects and related persons free of unjust violence. By this, we mean cases where, on account of the Christian, just, and correct cause – as defined in our treaty of Christian alliance – we are attacked, invaded, conquered, or in any other way injured, but only for this cause and no other."

On the other hand, the struggle between Protestant factions injured the advancement of their mutual interests, and Bucer, encouraged by Philip, was accordingly occupied in the attempt to bring Protestants together on a common religious platform, the result being the Wittenberg Concord. The emperor's fears as to the political purpose of the league were, for the time being, set aside, but at the same time a council which would include representatives of the pope was rejected and measures were taken to secure the permanence of the Protestant cause in the future. In 1538–39 relations between Roman Catholics and Protestants became strained almost to the breaking-point, and war was averted only by the Frankfort Respite. The Protestants, however, failed to avail themselves of their opportunities, largely through the extreme docility and pliability of Philip.

=== Bigamous marriage ===
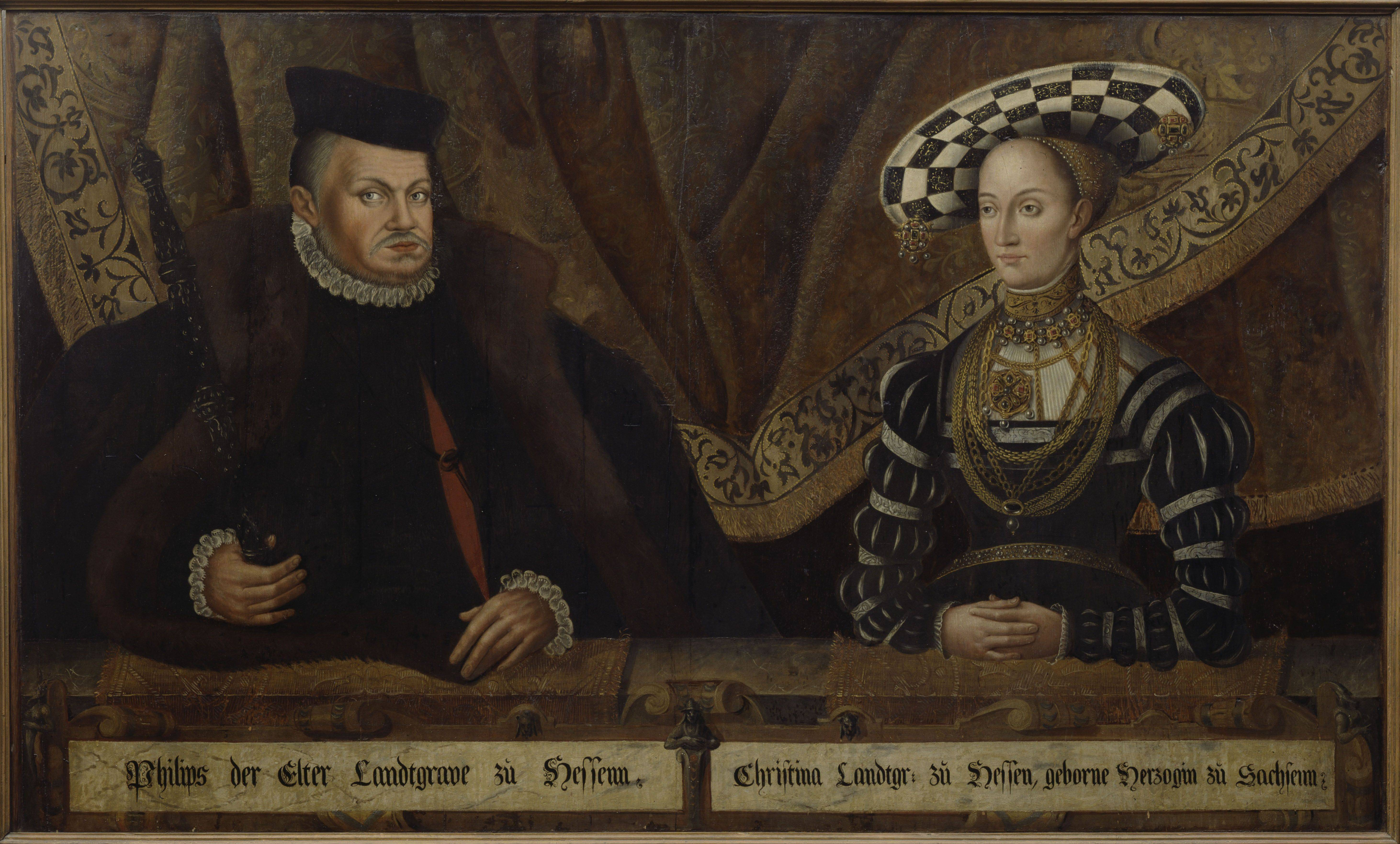
Philip of Hesse and Christine of Saxony, by Jost v. Hoff

Within a few weeks of his 1523 marriage to Christine of Saxony, who was also alleged to be an immoderate drinker, Philip committed adultery; and as early as 1526 he began to consider the permissibility of bigamy. According to Martin Luther, he lived "constantly in a state of adultery and fornication."

Philip accordingly wrote Luther for his opinion about the matter, alleging as a precedent the polygamy of the patriarchs, but Luther replied that it was not enough for a Christian to consider the acts of the patriarchs, rather that he, like the patriarchs, must have special divine sanction. Since such sanction was clearly lacking in this case, Luther advised against bigamous marriage, especially for Christians, unless there was extreme necessity, as, for example, if the wife was leprous, or abnormal in other respects. Despite this discouragement, Philip gave up neither his project to secure a bigamous marriage nor his life of sensuality, which kept him for years from receiving communion.

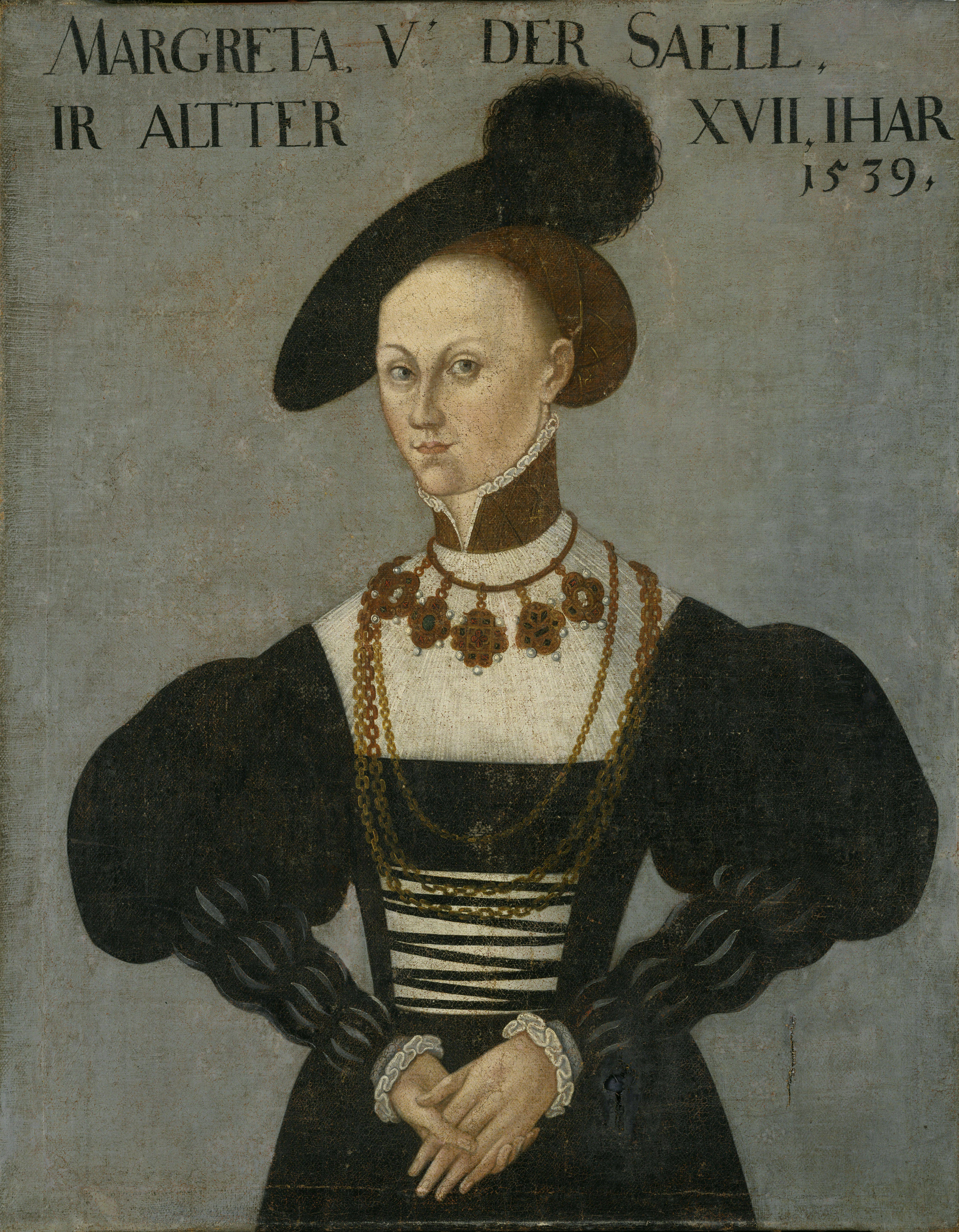
Margarethe von der Saale, copy of a painting by an unknown artist

Philip was affected by Melanchthon's opinion concerning the case of Henry VIII, where the Reformer had proposed that the king's difficulty could be solved by his taking a second wife better than by his divorcing the first one. To strengthen his position, there were Luther's own statements in his sermons on the Book of Genesis, as well as historical precedents which proved to his satisfaction that it was impossible for anything to be un-Christian that God had not punished in the case of the patriarchs, who in the New Testament were held up as models of faith. It was during an illness due to his excesses that the thought of taking a second wife became a fixed purpose.

It seemed to him to be the only salve for his troubled conscience and the only hope of moral improvement open to him. He accordingly proposed to marry the daughter of one of his sister's ladies-in-waiting, Margarethe von der Saale. While the landgrave had no scruples in this matter whatsoever, Margarethe was unwilling to take the step unless they had the approval of the theologians and the consent of the elector of Saxony, John Frederick I, and of Duke Maurice of Saxony. Philip easily gained his first wife's consent to the marriage. Bucer, who was strongly influenced by political arguments, was won over by the landgrave's threat to ally himself with the Emperor if he did not secure the consent of the theologians to the marriage, and the Wittenberg divines were worked upon by the plea of the prince's ethical necessity.

Thus the "secret advice of a confessor" was won from Luther and Melanchthon (on 10 December 1539), neither of them knowing that the bigamous wife had already been chosen. Bucer and Melanchthon were now summoned, without any reason given, to appear in Rotenburg an der Fulda, where, on 4 March 1540, Philip and Margarethe were united. The time was particularly inauspicious for any scandal affecting the Protestants, for the Emperor, who had rejected the Frankfort Respite, was about to invade Germany. A few weeks later, however, the whole matter was revealed by Philip's sister Elisabeth, and the scandal caused a painful reaction throughout Germany. Some of Philip's allies refused to serve under him, and Luther, under the plea that it was a matter of advice given in the confessional, refused to acknowledge his part in the marriage.

=== Overtures to the Emperor ===
This event had affected the entire political situation in Germany. Even while the marriage question was occupying his attention, Philip was engaged in constructing far-reaching plans for implementing the new religion and for drawing together all the opponents of the House of Habsburg, though at the same time he did not give up hopes of reaching a religious compromise through diplomatic means. He was bitter regarding the criticism directed against him, and feared that the law which he himself had enacted against adultery might be applied to his own case. In this state of mind he was now determined to make his peace with the Emperor on terms which would not involve desertion of the Protestant cause. He offered to observe neutrality regarding the imperial acquisition of the Duchy of Cleves and to prevent a French alliance, on condition that the emperor would pardon him for all his opposition and violation of the imperial laws, though without direct mention of his bigamy.

The advances of Philip, though he declined to do anything prejudicial to the Protestant cause, were welcomed by the Emperor. Following Bucer's advice, the landgrave now proceeded to take active steps with the hope of establishing religious peace between the Roman Catholics and Protestants. Secure of the imperial favor, he agreed to appear at the Diet of Regensburg in 1541, and his presence there contributed to the direction affairs took at the Regensburg religious colloquy, in which Melanchthon, Bucer, and Johann Pistorius the Elder represented the Protestant side. Philip was successful in securing the permission of the Emperor to establish a university at Marburg, and in return for the concession of an amnesty, he agreed to stand by Charles against all his enemies, excepting Protestantism and the Schmalkaldic League; to make no alliances with France, England, or the duke of Cleves; and to prevent the admission of these powers into the Schmalkaldic League.

For his part, the Emperor agreed not to attack him in case there was a common war against all Protestants. These arrangements for special terms led to the collapse of Philip's position as leader of the Protestant party. He had become an object of suspicion, and, although the league continued to remain in force, and gained some new adherents in succeeding years, its real power had dissipated. But while only Albrecht VII, Duke of Mecklenburg, and Henry V, Duke of Brunswick-Lüneburg, of the secular princes were still faithful to the Roman Catholic cause, and while united action might at the time easily have resulted in the triumph of Protestantism, there was no union of purpose. Duke Maurice of Saxony and Joachim II of Brandenburg would not join the Schmalkaldic League; Cleves was successfully invaded by imperial troops; and Protestantism was rigorously suppressed in Metz.

In 1543 the internal dissensions of the Protestant league compelled Philip to resign from its leadership and to think seriously of dissolving it. He put his trust entirely in the Emperor's good faith, agreeing to help him against both the French and the Turks. At the Diet of Speyer in 1544 he championed the Emperor's policy with eloquence. The bishop of Augsburg declared he must be inspired by the Holy Spirit, and Emperor Charles V now intended to make him commander-in-chief in the next war against the Turks.

=== Resumption of hostility to Charles ===
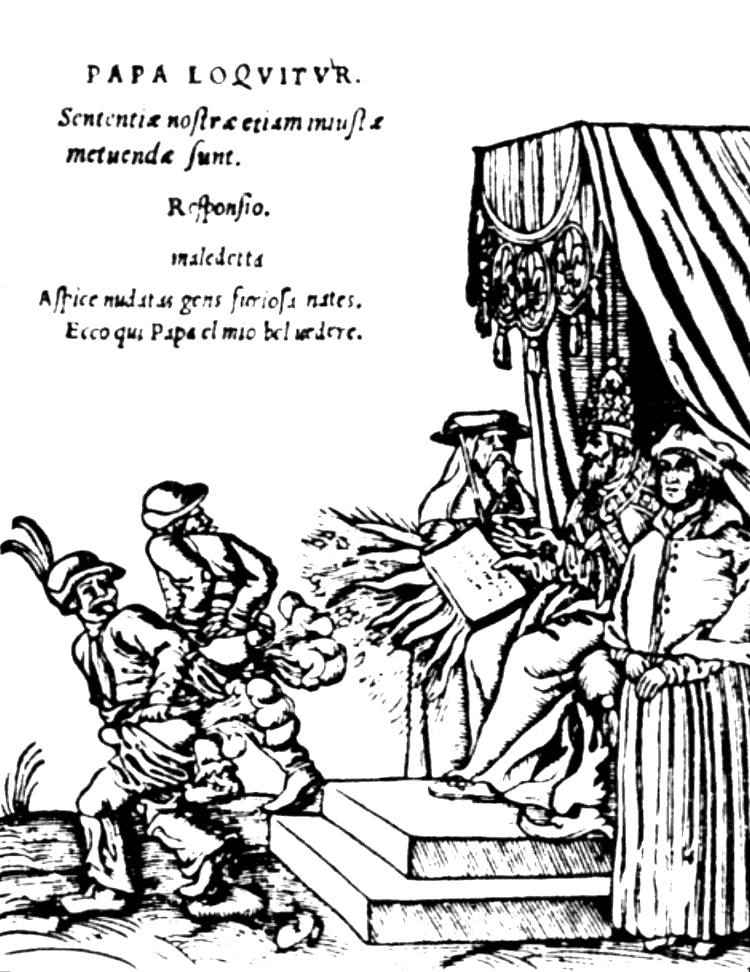
On 29 March 1545 Philipp read the pamphlet that contained this woodcut and wrote in a letter to John Frederick I, Elector of Saxony the next day that it pleased him very much. From a series of woodcuts (1545) usually referred to as the Papstspotbilder or Papstspottbilder in German or Depictions of the Papacy in English, by Lucas Cranach, commissioned by Martin Luther. Title: Kissing the Pope's Feet. German peasants respond to a papal bull of Pope Paul III. Caption reads: "Don't frighten us Pope, with your ban, and don't be such a furious man. Otherwise we shall turn around and show you our rears."

The situation was suddenly changed, however, and Philip was tardily forced again into the opposition against the Emperor, by the Treaty of Crépy of 1544, which opened his eyes to the danger threatening Protestantism. He prevented the Roman Catholic Duke Henry V of Brunswick-Lüneburg from taking forcible possession of his dominions and unsuccessfully planned a new alliance with German princes against Austria, pledging its members to prevent the acceptance of the decrees of the projected Council of Trent. When this failed, he sought to secure the neutrality of Bavaria in a possible war against the Protestants and proposed a new Protestant alliance to take the place of the Schmalkaldic League.

But all of this, like his projected coalition with the Swiss, was prevented from succeeding by the jealousy prevailing between Duke Maurice of Saxony and the Elector John Frederick I of Saxony. Fearful of the success of these plans, the emperor invited Philip to an interview at Speyer. Philip spoke plainly in criticism of the Emperor's policy, and it was soon evident that peace could not be preserved. Four months later (20 July 1546) the imperial ban was declared against John Frederick and Philip as perjured rebels and traitors. The result was the Schmalkaldic War, the outcome of which was unfavorable to Protestant interests. The defeat at the Battle of Mühlberg in 1547 and the capture of the Elector John Frederick marked the fall of the Schmalkaldic League.

In despair Philip, who had been negotiating with the Emperor for some time, agreed to throw himself on his mercy, on condition that his territorial rights would not be impaired and that he himself would not be imprisoned. These terms were disregarded, however, and on 23 June 1547 both the leaders of the Schmalkaldic League were taken to south Germany and held as captives.

=== Imprisonment of Philip and Interim in Hesse ===
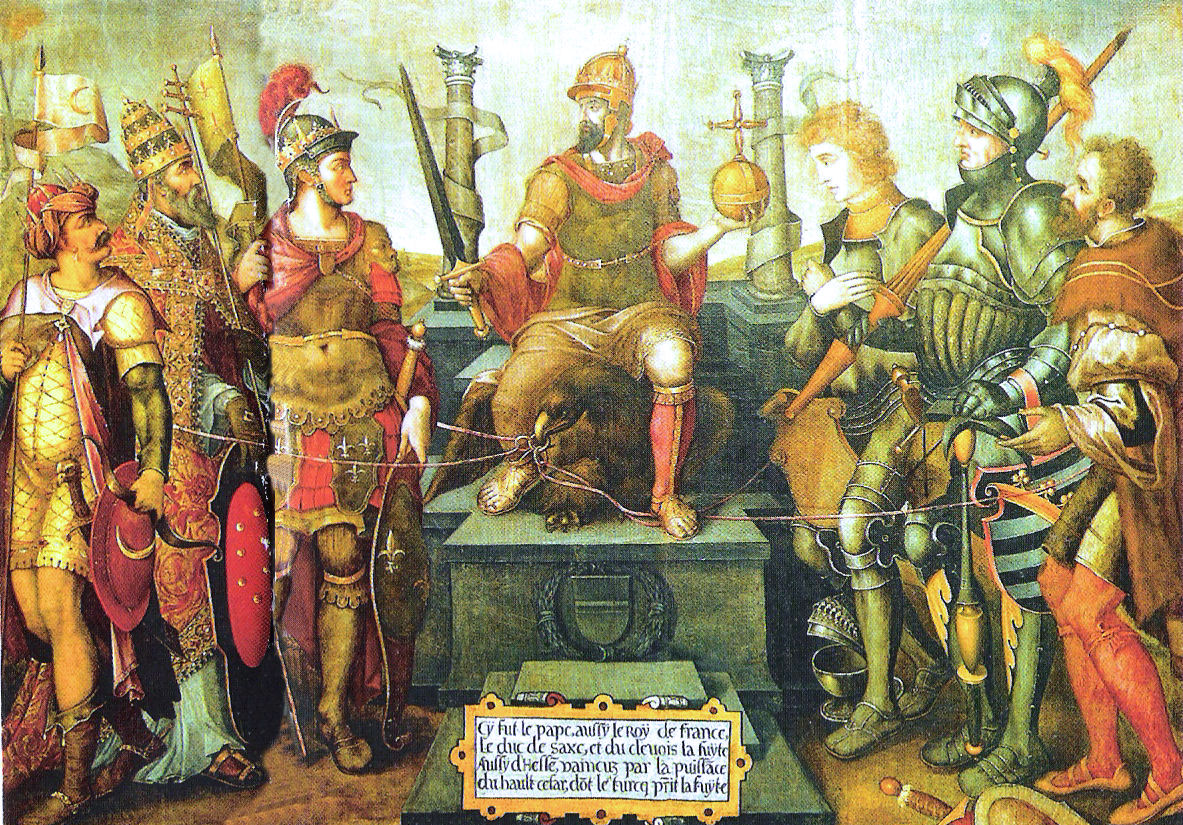
Allegory showing Charles V (centre) enthroned over his defeated enemies (from left to right): Suleiman the Magnificent, Pope Clement VII, Francis I, the Duke of Cleves, the Duke of Saxony and the Landgrave of Hesse

The imprisonment of Philip put the Protestants in Hesse into great trials and difficulties. It had previously been organized carefully by Philip and Bucer, and synods, presbyteries, and a system of discipline had been established. Now the public worship showed no uniformity, discipline was not applied, and many competing sectaries existed. The Augsburg Interim was finally introduced, sanctioning Catholic practises and terms.

Philip himself wrote from prison to forward the acceptance of the Augsburg Interim, especially as his liberty depended upon it. As long as the unrestricted preaching of the Gospel and the Protestant tenet of justification by faith were secured, other matters seemed to him of subordinate importance. He read Roman Catholic controversial literature, attended mass, and was much impressed by his study of the Fathers of the Church. The Hessian clergy, however, boldly opposed the introduction of the Interim and the government at Kassel refused to obey the landgrave's commands. Meanwhile, his imprisonment was made still more bitter by the information which he received concerning conditions in Hesse, and the rigor of his confinement was increased after he had made an unsuccessful attempt to escape. It was not until 1552 that the Peace of Passau gave him his long-desired freedom and that he was able, on 12 September 1552, to reenter his capital, Kassel.

=== Closing years ===
Though Philip was now active in restoring order within his territories, new leaders—such as Maurice of Saxony and Christopher of Württemberg—had come to the fore. Philip no longer desired to assume the leadership of the Protestant party. All his energies were now directed toward finding a basis of agreement between Protestants and Roman Catholics. At his direction his theologians were prominent in the various conferences where representative Roman Catholics and Protestants assembled to attempt to find a working basis for reunion.

Philip was also much disturbed by the internal conflicts that arose after Luther's death between his followers and the disciples of Melanchthon. He never wearied in urging the necessity of mutual toleration between Calvinists and Lutherans, and to the last cherished the hope of a great Protestant federation, so that, with this end in view, he cultivated friendly relations with French Protestants and with Elizabeth I of England.

Financial aid was given to the Huguenots, and Hessian troops fought side by side with them in the French religious civil wars, this policy contributing to the declaration of toleration at Amboise in March 1563. He gave permanent form to the Hessian Church by the great agenda of 1566–67, and in his will, dated 1562, urged his sons to maintain the Augsburg Confession and the Concord of Wittenberg, and at the same time to work in behalf of a reunion of Roman Catholics and Protestants if opportunity and circumstances should permit.

Philip died in 1567 and was interred in Kassel.

== Marriages and children ==
Philip married in Dresden on 11 December 1523 Christine of Saxony (daughter of George, Duke of Saxony) and had in this marriage 10 children:

1. Agnes (31 May 1527 – 4 November 1555), married:
  1. in Marburg on 9 January 1541 to Elector Maurice of Saxony;
  2. in Weimar on 26 May 1555 to Duke John Frederick II, Duke of Saxony.
2. Anna (26 October 1529 – 10 July 1591), married on 24 February 1544 to Count palatine Wolfgang of Zweibrücken.
3. William IV of Hesse-Kassel (or Hesse-Cassel) (24 June 1532 – 25 August 1592).
4. Philip Louis (29 June 1534 – 31 August 1535).
5. Barbara (8 April 1536 – 8 June 1597), married:
  1. in Reichenweier on 10 September 1555 to George I, Duke of Württemberg;
  2. in Kassel on 11 November 1568 to Count Daniel of Waldeck.
6. Louis IV of Hesse-Marburg (27 May 1537 – 9 October 1604).
7. Elisabeth (13 February 1539 – 14 March 1582), married on 8 July 1560 to Louis VI, Elector Palatine.
8. Philip II of Hesse-Rheinfels (22 April 1541 – 20 November 1583).
9. Christine (29 June 1543 – 13 May 1604), married in Gottorp on 17 December 1564 to Duke Adolf of Holstein-Gottorp.
10. George I of Hesse-Darmstadt (10 September 1547 – 7 February 1596).

Also, on 4 March 1540 he morganatically married Margarethe von der Saale, while remaining married to Christine of Saxony. With Margarethe he had the following children:

1. Philipp, Count of Dietz (12 March 1541 – 10 June 1569).
2. Hermann, Count of Dietz (12 February 1542 – ca. 1568).
3. Christopher Ernst, Count of Dietz (16 July 1543 – 20 April 1603).
4. Margretha, Countess of Dietz (14 October 1544 – 1608), married:
  1. in Kassel on 3 October 1567 to Count Hans Bernhard of Eberstein;
  2. in Frauenberg on 10 August 1577 to Count Stephan Heinrich of Everstein.
5. Albrecht, Count of Dietz (10 March 1546 – 3 October 1569).
6. Philipp Konrad, Count of Dietz (29 September 1547 – 25 May 1569),
7. Moritz, Count of Dietz (8 June 1553 – 23 January 1575).
8. Ernst, Count of Dietz (12 August 1554 – 1570).
9. Anna, Countess of Dietz (1557 – 2/5 January 1558).

On his death, his territories were divided (Hesse becoming Hesse-Kassel, Hesse-Marburg, Hesse-Rheinfels, and Hesse-Darmstadt) between his four sons by his first wife, namely William IV of Hesse-Kassel, Louis IV of Hesse-Marburg, Philip II of Hesse-Rheinfels, and Georg I of Hesse-Darmstadt.

== Ancestry ==
Ancestors of Philip I of Hesse

8. Louis I, Landgrave of Hesse
4. Louis II, Landgrave of Hesse
9. Anna of Saxony
2. William II, Landgrave of Hesse
10. Ludwig I, Count of Württemberg-Urach
5. Mathilde of Württemberg-Urach
11. Mechthild of the Palatinate
1. Philip I, Landgrave of Hesse
12. Henry IV, Duke of Mecklenburg
6. Magnus II, Duke of Mecklenburg-Schwerin and Güstrow
13. Dorothea of Brandenburg
3. Anna of Mecklenburg-Schwerin
14. Eric II, Duke of Pomerania-Wolgast
7. Sophie of Pommern-Wolgast
15. Sophia of Pomerania-Stolp

Regnal titles
Preceded by William II	Landgrave of Hesse; 1509–1567	Succeeded by William IV of Hesse-Kassel
Preceded by William II	Landgrave of Hesse; 1509–1567	Succeeded by Louis IV of Hesse-Marburg
Preceded by William II	Landgrave of Hesse; 1509–1567	Succeeded by Philip II of Hesse-Rheinfels
Preceded by William II	Landgrave of Hesse; 1509–1567	Succeeded by Georg I of Hesse-Darmstadt
