= Johann Forster (disambiguation) =

Johann Forster (1496–1556) was a German Lutheran theologian and professor.

Johann Forster may also refer to:

- Johann Reinhold Forster (1729–1798), German pastor and naturalist
- Johann Georg Adam Forster (1754–1794), son of previous, German naturalist and revolutionary
