= Schrade =

Schrade may refer to:

- Schrade (surname)
- Imperial Schrade, an American knife manufacturer
- 48422 Schrade, a main-belt asteroid
