= Schrade (surname) =

Schrade is a German surname. Notable people with the surname include:

- Christian Schrade (1876–1962), German architect
- Dirk Schrade (born 1978), German equestrian, Summer Olympics 2012
- Leo Schrade (1903–1964), American musicologist
- Ulrich Schrade (1943–2009), Polish philosopher, educationist, and ethicist
- Willi Schrade (1935–2025), German actor
