= Mehrstetten =

- Municipality
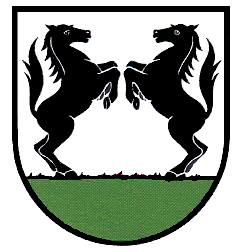
- Coat of arms

- Location of Mehrstetten within Reutlingen district
- Interactive map of Mehrstetten
- Location within Germany Location within Baden-Württemberg
- Coordinates: 48°22′32″N 09°34′00″E
- Country: Germany
- State: Baden-Württemberg
- Admin. region: Tübingen
- District: Reutlingen

Government
  - Mayor (2022–30): Robert Mellinghof

Area
  - Total: 17.10 km^{2} (6.60 sq mi)
- Elevation: 750 m (2,460 ft)

Population (2025-12-31)
  - Total: 1,507
  - Density: 88.13/km^{2} (228.3/sq mi)
- Time zone: UTC+01:00 (CET)
  - Summer (DST): UTC+02:00 (CEST)
- Postal codes: 72537
- Dialling codes: 07381
- Vehicle registration: RT
- Website: www.mehrstetten.de

Mehrstetten is a municipality in the district of Reutlingen in Baden-Württemberg in Germany. It is located seven kilometers southeast of Münsingen.

== Neighbouring communities ==
The city Münsingen district of Reutlingen and the community Schelklingen (Alb-Donau-Kreis) are bordering to the municipality Mehrstetten.

Mehrstetten in Reutlingen district

== Constituent communities ==
The municipality includes the village Mehrstetten, the settlement Greut, the homestead Ziegelhof and the group of houses Station Mehrstetten. In the municipality lies the deserted Aymstetten.

== History ==
Mehrstetten was mentioned around 1300 as Merstetten for the first time. Mehrstetten came in 1654 to the office Münsingen in the Duchy of Württemberg, this became in 1808 Oberamt and in 1938 district Münsingen and with its resolution on January 1, 1973 the district of Reutlingen.

== Religions ==
Since the 15th century there is in Mehrstetten a parish. Since the Reformation the place is marked Protestant.

== Community development ==
1977 part of the district-Schelklingen Sondernach with three repatriates courts came to Mehrstetten.

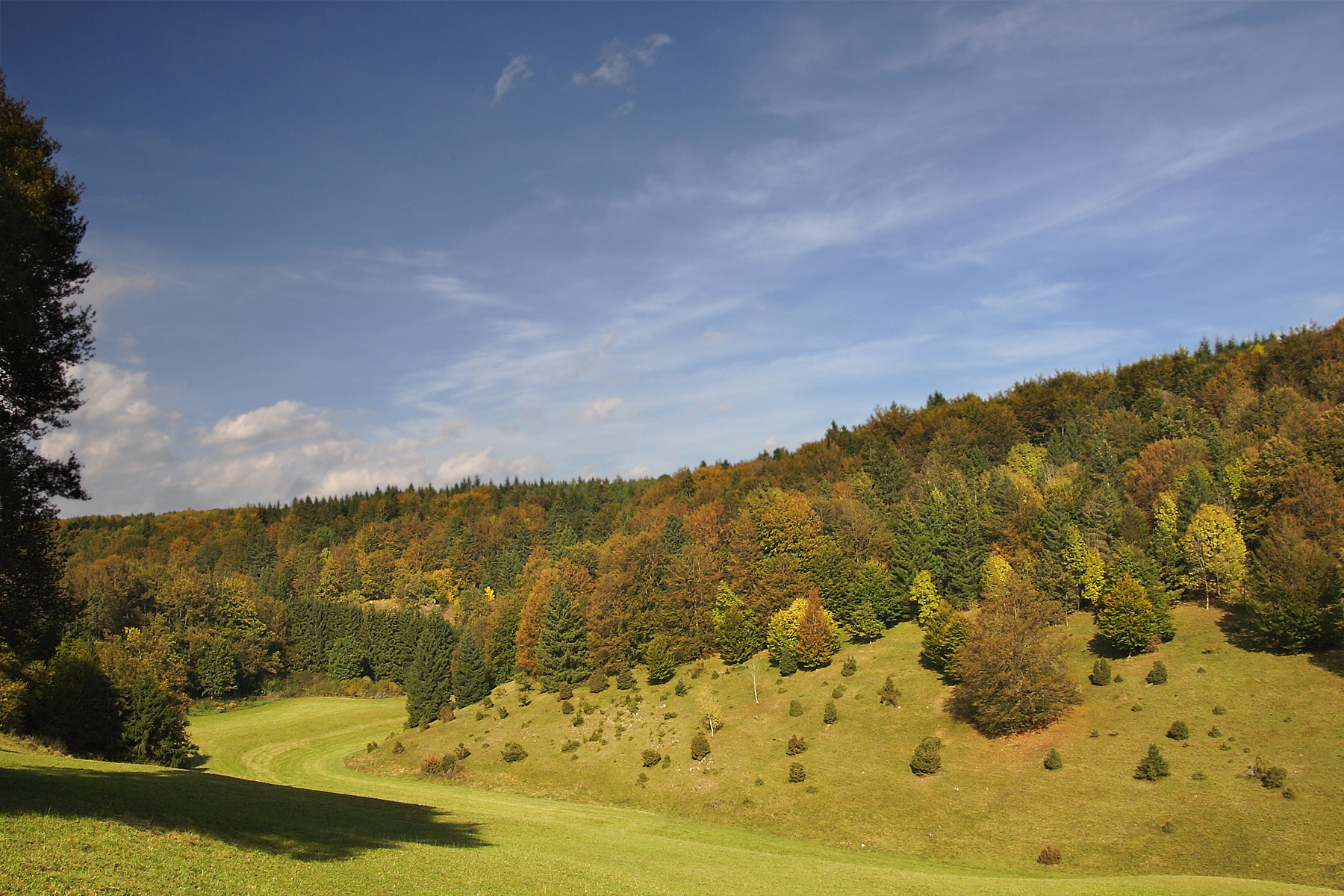
Böttinger Tal Nature protective area

== Population Development ==
The population figures are census results (¹) or official updates the State from the Statistical Office in Stuttgart (only principal residents).

Historical population
Date	Pop.	±%
December 1871 ¹	820	—
December 1900 ¹	882	+7.6%
December 1925 ¹	863	−2.2%
May 17, 1939 ¹	788	−8.7%
September 13, 1950 ¹	913	+15.9%
June 6, 1961 ¹	963	+5.5%
May 27, 1970 ¹	1,053	+9.3%
May 25, 1987 ¹	1,201	+14.1%
December 31, 1990	1,312	+9.2%
December 31, 1995	1,392	+6.1%
December 31, 2000	1,417	+1.8%
December 31, 2005	1,446	+2.0%
December 31, 2010	1,348	−6.8%

== Council ==
The council Mehrstetten has 10 members. The local elections in Baden-Württemberg on May 25, 2014 resulted in the following official results. The turnout was 57.00% (2009: 64.48%). The council consists of the elected honorary councilors and the mayor as chairman. The mayor is entitled to vote in the municipal council.

Free Voters Association (FWV)	44.3%	4 seats	2009: 54.3%, 5 seats	Independent Citizens' List (UB)	55.7%	6 seats 2009: 45.7%, 5 seats

== Mayor ==
The mayor is elected for a term of eight years. The current mayor is Robert Mellinghof, elected in 2022.

== Arms ==
Blazon: In silver on green bottom two facing upright black steeds.

== Community partnership ==
Mehrstetten maintains a partnership with the Hungarian Herceghalom.

== Things ==
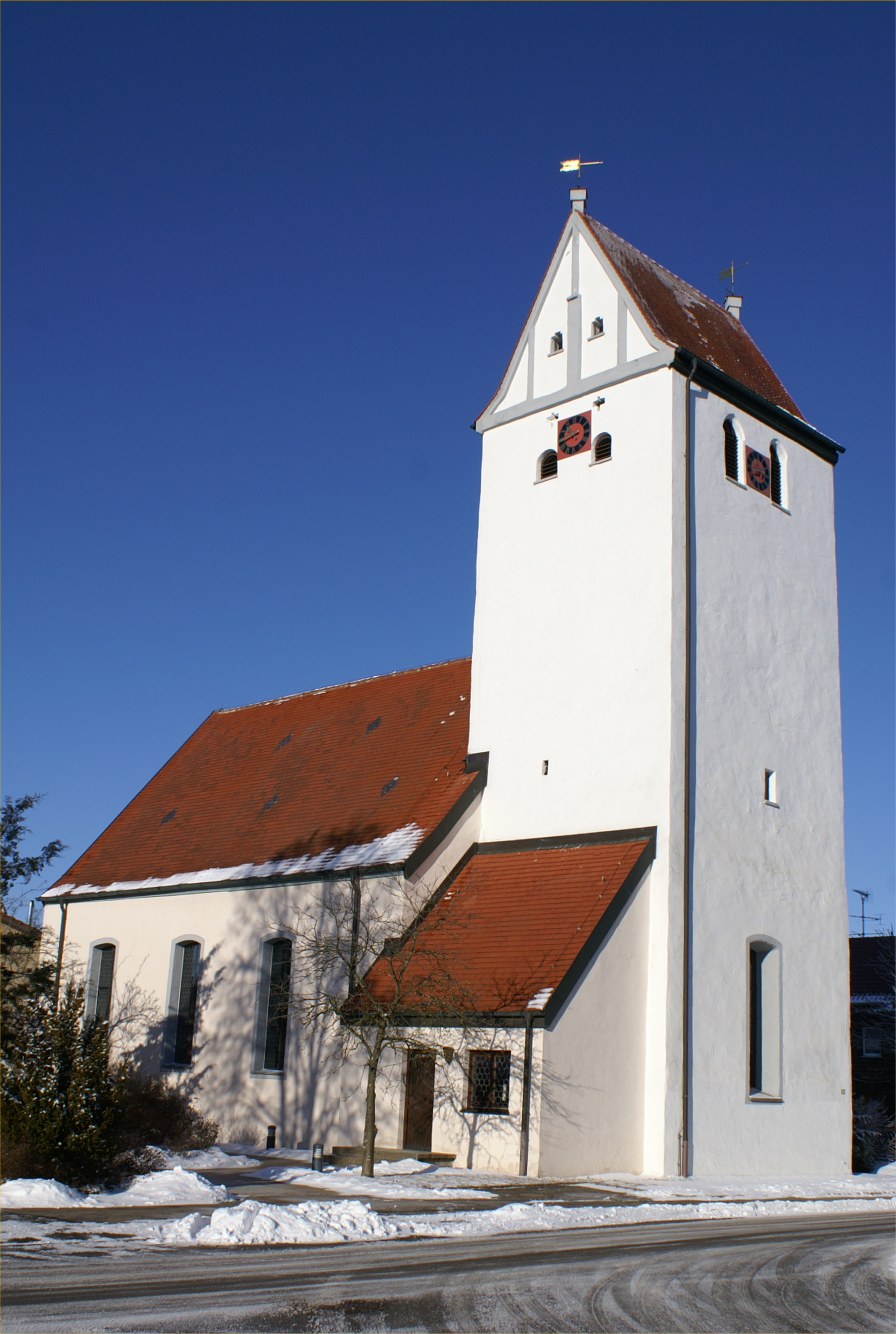
Evangelic church Mehrstetten

== Local museum ==
Exceptional pieces about the village life on the Alb plateau in the 19th century, gathered by members of the volunteer-run museum in the former bull stable of Mehrstetten. The museum was opened in 1991.

During a tour you will encounter a kitchen with the old wood stove and churn and the parlor, where hanging above the stove shoes and clothes could dry. Of interest is the unique collection of more than 200 old linen bags. These were formerly the most valuable possession of the people. They were given names and often numbered. Even changes of ownership by inheritance cases can be found on the linen today, old names were deleted and new written underneath.

There are show and craft days, where there is much to experience. The old forge (Alte Schmiede) is just put into operation, also an old transmission or a 400 year old loom. From May to October the museum is open every first Sunday of the month from 13:30 to 16:30.

== Regular events ==
- Hocketse from JuZe Mehrstetten annually on the second weekend of August
- Autumn Festival of the band Mehrstetten annually on the last weekend of October

== Traffic ==
The County Road 6772 connects Mehrstetten with the Bundesstraße 465, coming from Bad Urach via Münsingen and Ehingen (Donau) to Biberach an der Riss.

The public transport is guaranteed by the Verkehrsverbund Neckar-Alb-Donau (NALDO). The community is located in the comb 225. Mehrstetten received 1901 by the extension of the Reutlingen–Schelklingen railway connection to the rail network. The Royal Württemberg State Railways built the station building as Standardized railway station (Württemberg)

== Public institutions ==
- Youth Centre Mehrstetten

== Education ==
In Mehrstetten there is a primary and a Hauptschule. For the youngsters, there is a kindergarten.

== Personality ==
- Christian Schrade (1876-1964), architect, focus church buildings
