= Protestation at Speyer =

1529 petition of the Holy Roman Empire against an imperial ban of Martin Luther

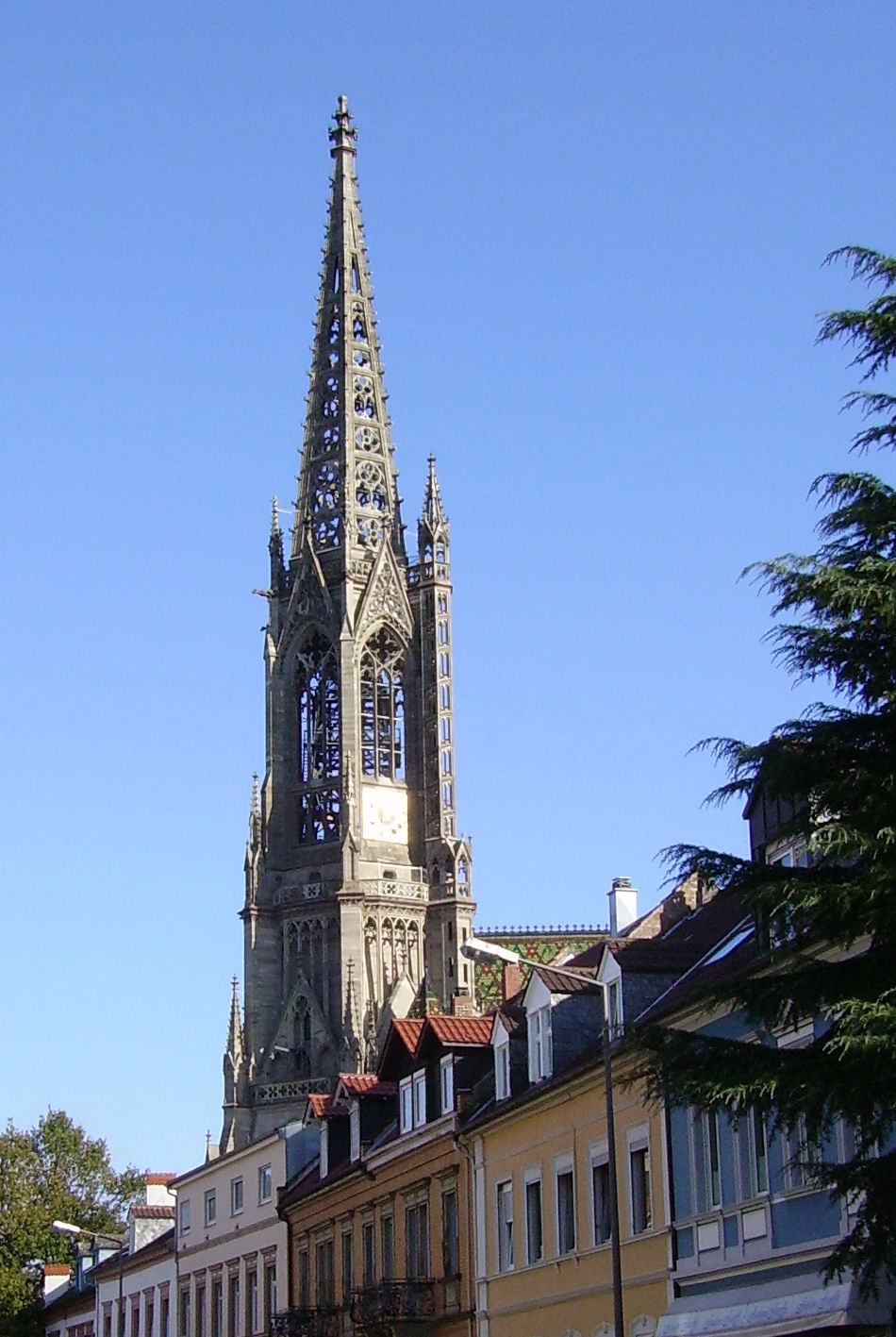
The Memorial Church, consecrated in 1904, commemorates the Protestation at Speyer.

On 19 April 1529, six princes and representatives of 14 Imperial Free Cities petitioned the Imperial Diet at Speyer against an imperial ban of Martin Luther, as well as the proscription of his works and teachings, and called for the unhindered spread of the evangelical faith.

== The "Protestants" ==
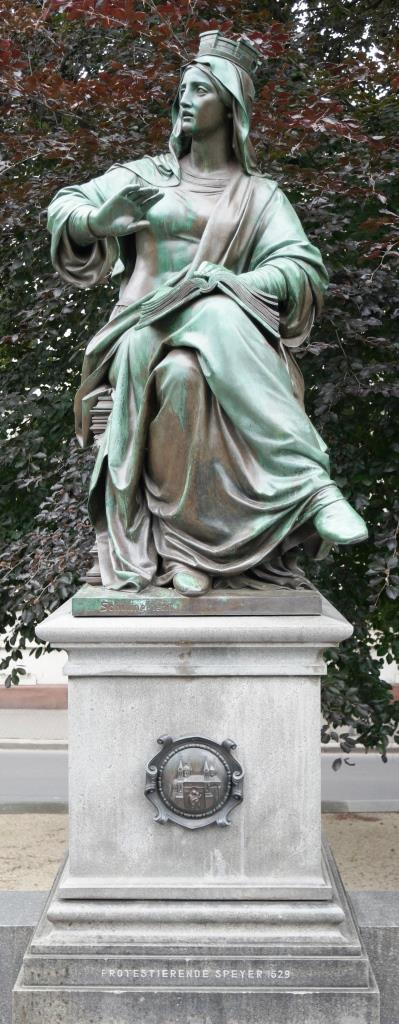
The Protesting Speyer, part of the Luther Monument in Worms

=== The Six Princes ===
1. John the Steadfast of Wettin, Elector of Saxony
2. George the Pious of Hohenzollern, Margrave of Brandenburg-Ansbach
3. Ernest I the Confessor of Brunswick-Lüneburg, Duke of Lüneburg-Celle and his brother
4. Francis, Duke of Brunswick-Lüneburg, Duke of Gifhorn
5. Philip I the Magnanimous, Landgrave of Hesse
6. Wolfgang of Ascania, Prince of Anhalt-Köthen

=== The 14 Imperial Free Cities ===
1. Strassburg
2. Augsburg
3. Ulm
4. Konstanz
5. Lindau
6. Memmingen
7. Kempten
8. Nördlingen
9. Heilbronn
10. Reutlingen
11. Isny
12. St. Gallen
13. Weissenburg
14. Windsheim

== "Protestants" withdrawing their initial support ==
1. Cologne
2. Frankfurt am Main

== Cause ==
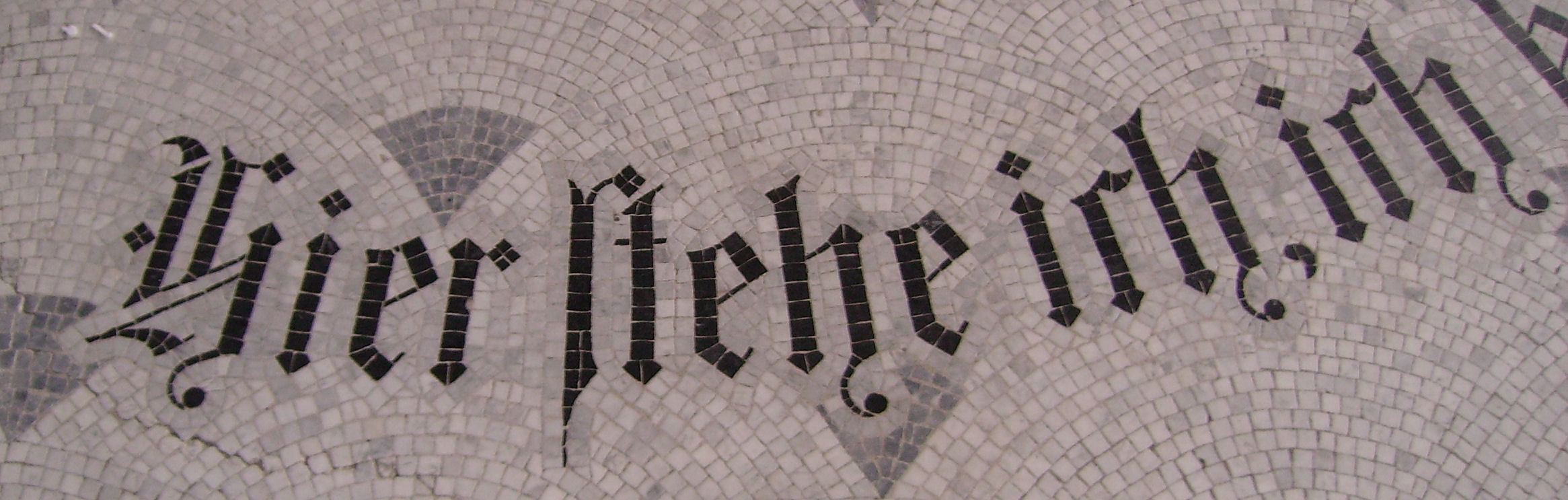
"Hier stehe ich. Ich kann nicht anders. Amen." ("Here I stand. I can not otherwise. Amen"), the words of Martin Luther now inscribed in the Memorial Church.

Eight years earlier, Martin Luther was banned by the Holy Roman Empire at the Diet of Worms of 1521. Emperor Charles V wanted to end the religious unrest between the Catholic majority and the evangelical minority at the Second Diet of Speyer. Lutheran heresy and the resulting religious strife did not figure in his political plans.

The Edict of Worms had been suspended in 1526 when the Diet of Speyer decided that every prince should hold whichever religious beliefs he could justify before his King and God.

Three years after the Diet of 1526, on the 1 March 1529, Charles V announced the second Diet of Speyer. He again let himself be represented by his brother Ferdinand, since he could not personally appear due to the ongoing war with France.

In his opening address, Ferdinand gave the decision of the Emperor: the annulment of the Diet's decision in 1526, recognition of "great mistakes and misunderstanding", and the threat of Imperial ban against "seduction by false beliefs". Until clarification from another council all further new developments would remain forbidden. He also made further declarations:

Those that until now have followed the Edict of Worms should continue to do so. In the areas where this has been deviated from, there shall be no further new developments and no-one shall be refused Mass. Finally, the sects which contradict the sacrament of the true body and blood, shall absolutely not be tolerated, no more than the Anabaptists.

On 19 April, the majority of representatives accepted the revocation of the 1526 edict. The evangelicals were told that they should yield "to the fair and proper decisions" of the majority. At this point the evangelical princes left the hall. When they returned somewhat later, Ferdinand wanted to leave the hall and refused to listen to them. So their objection was read out: they protested against the decision of the majority, to undo the decision of the 1526 Reichstag. Ferdinand demanded that they "accept and obey the decision".

The Protestant delegates refused to be bound by secular authority in matters of faith. Protestant delegates were worried that the Imperial edict would allow princes of a majority faith to war against what was deemed as heretical faiths. The result of such a ruling would entail lawlessness and warfare. Protestant delegates argued that faith is a personal fight that must be respected. Such a belief was revolutionary as it implied that secular authority and personal relationship to God was separate, and ones convictions could not be encroached upon was a controversial stance that future protestants would fight on. On 20 April they presented the "Letter of Protestation", which Ferdinand refused to accept. Therefore, it did not come to be read out, but was printed and made public.

The "Letter of Protestation" was signed by Johann, Elector of Saxony, Georg, Margrave of Brandenburg, Ernst, Duke of Braunschweig-Lüneburg, Philipp, Landgrave of Hesse, and Wolfgang, Prince of Anhalt.

At the final sitting of the Diet on 24 April, the "decision of the Diet" was once more read out, but no word was said of the protest by the evangelical princes. In response the councils of the evangelical princes and the agents of the Free Cities met on 25 April and drew up a Instrumentum Appellationis, in which complaints against the decision of the Diet were once more summarised. This text was brought to the Holy Roman Emperor by an embassy. Since this Diet in Speyer the adherents of the reform movement became known as "Protestants", and thus the protestation of the Princes and Free Cities has been seen as the birth of Protestantism.

== The decision of the Reichstag was protested by ==
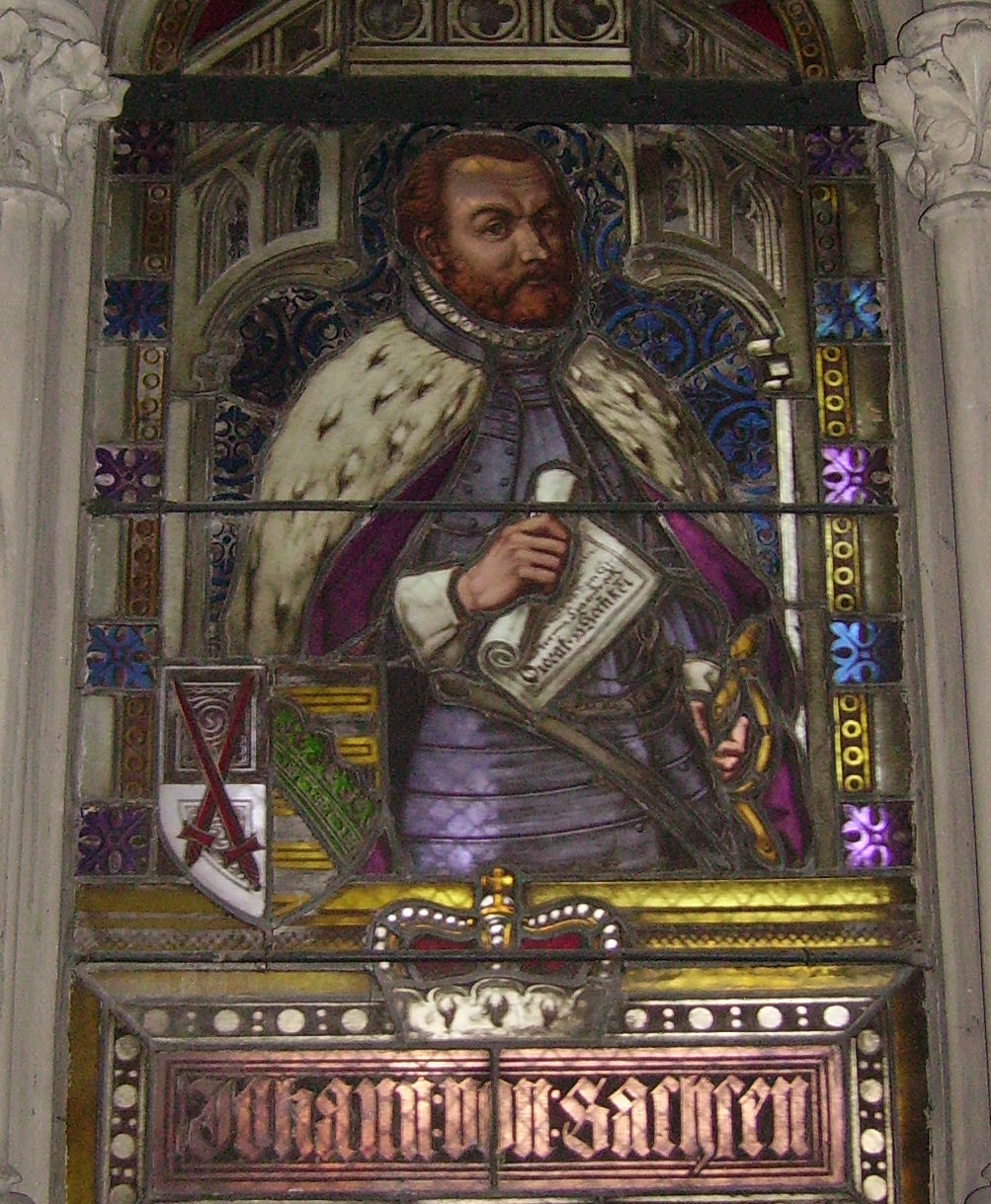
John, Elector of Saxony in the Speyer Memorial Church

1. Elector John the Steadfast of Saxony
2. Gregor Brück (Pontanus), Chancellor of Elector John
3. Philipp Melanchthon, companion of Elector John
4. Simon Grynaeus, companion of Philipp Melanchthon
5. Johann Agricola, chaplain of Elector John
6. Landgrave Phillip of Hesse
7. Erhard Schnepf, chaplain of Philip of Hesse
8. Margrave George of Brandenburg-Ansbach
9. Duke Ernst of Braunschweig-Lüneburg
10. Duke Franz of Braunschweig-Lüneburg
11. Johann Förster, Chancellor of Dukes Franz and Ernst of Braunschweig-Lüneburg
12. Prince Wolfgang of Anhalt
13. Count William of Fürstenberg
14. Bürgermeister Christoph Tetzel, representative of Nürnberg
15. Bürgermeister Christoph Kreß, representative of Nürnberg
16. Bürgermeister Bernhard B(P)aumgärtner, representative of Nürnberg
17. Councillor Jakob Sturm, representative of Straßburg
18. Guildmaster Matthias, clergyman, representative of Straßburg
19. Bürgermeister Bernhard Besserer, representative of Ulm
20. Bürgermeister Sebastian Hagelstein, representative of Windsheim
21. Bürgermeister Josef Weiß, representative of Reutlingen

== The decision of the Reichstag was voted for by ==
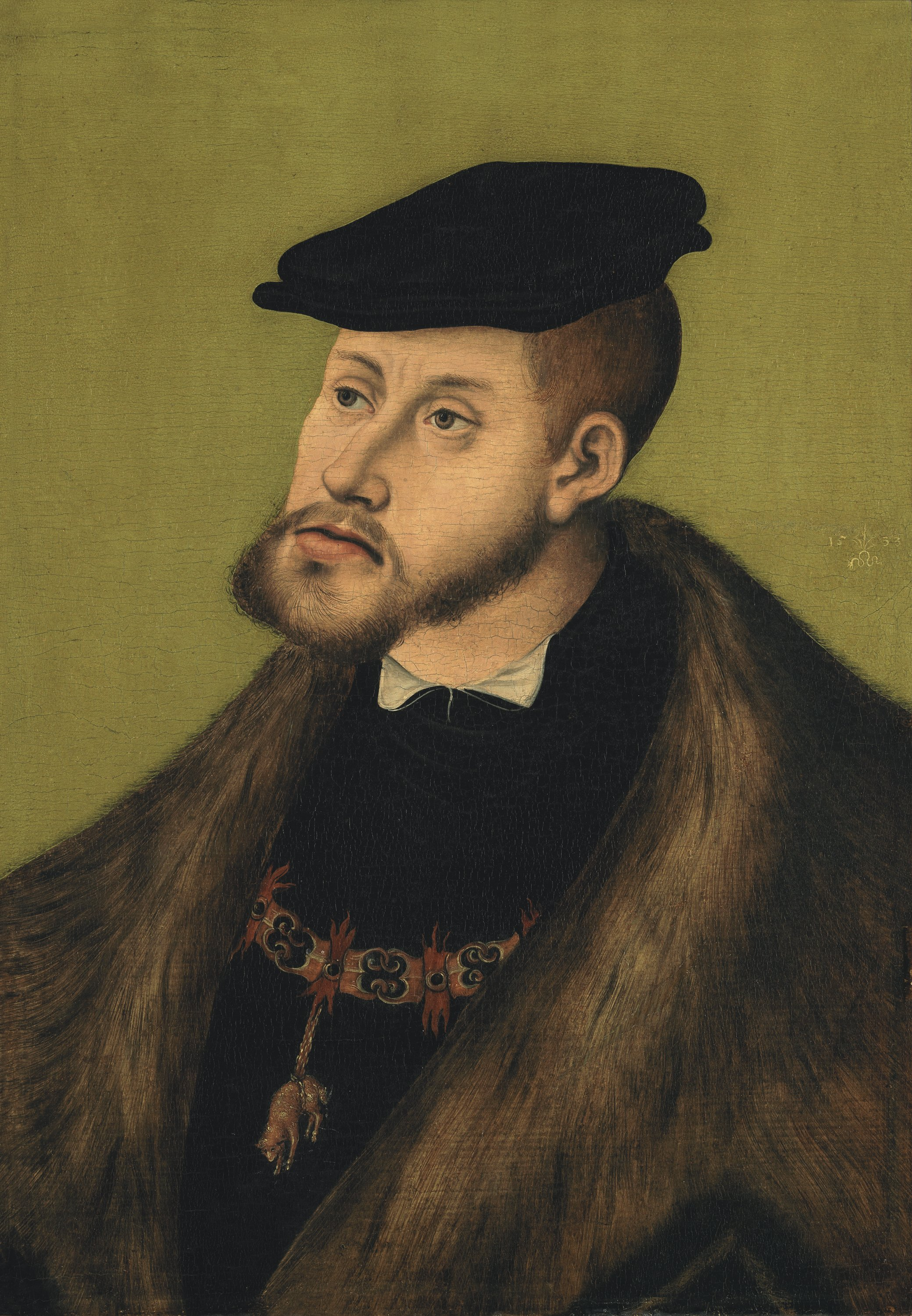
Charles V, Holy Roman Emperor by Lucas Cranach the Elder, 1533

1. Holy Roman Emperor Charles V,
2. Ferdinand, imperial commissioner and representative of Charles V
3. Grand Chancellor Bernhard Cles, Bishop of Trent, imperial commissioner
4. Freiherr Georg Truchsess von Waldburg, vice-regent of King Ferdinand
5. Dr. Johann Faber, canon of Konstanz and Basel
6. Probst Balthasar von Waldkirch, imperial commissioner
7. Frederick II, Elector Palatine, imperial commissioner
8. William IV, Duke of Bavaria, imperial commissioner
9. Leonhard von Eck, chancellor of Duke Wilhelm IV. of Bavaria
10. Louis X, Duke of Bavaria
11. Eric I, Duke of Brunswick-Lüneburg, imperial commissioner

== See also ==
- Approximate original German of the Protestation of 19 April on p. 50 of the edition ed. J. Ney; original German of the Appellation of 25 April on p. 27 of the edition ed. J. Ney. "Approximate original," I say, because according to Ney, “The protesting princes retained apparently no copy of the Protestation written down in a hurry and handed over to the Reichstag. For this reason, only the ‘approximate’ content of the Protestation handed over on the 19 April could be included in the Instrument of Appellation" (Ney, p. 50, note 1; cf. Ney, pp. 12 ff.). According to Eike Wolgast's entry in the Oxford encyclopedia of the Reformation ("Speyer, Protestation of"), "On 12 April 1529 the evangelical rulers submitted a written declaration to the diet that constituted an early draft of the subsequent protestation… On 19 April… the first protestation followed. It was rejected. Accordingly, the evangelical estates presented a second protestation on 20 April which repeated the previous day's arguments in greater detail… The protestation received legal status through the appeal that the Protestant princes and imperial cities lodged before two notaries in Speyer on 25 April 1529. This appeal contained a report on the proceedings between majority and minority and all important documents. The text was immediately disseminted in print," etc. (vol. 4, p. 104).
- An English translation of the Protestation.
- Speyer Memorial Church, consecrated in 1904 in honor of the Protestation.
