= Christian Schrade =

German architect

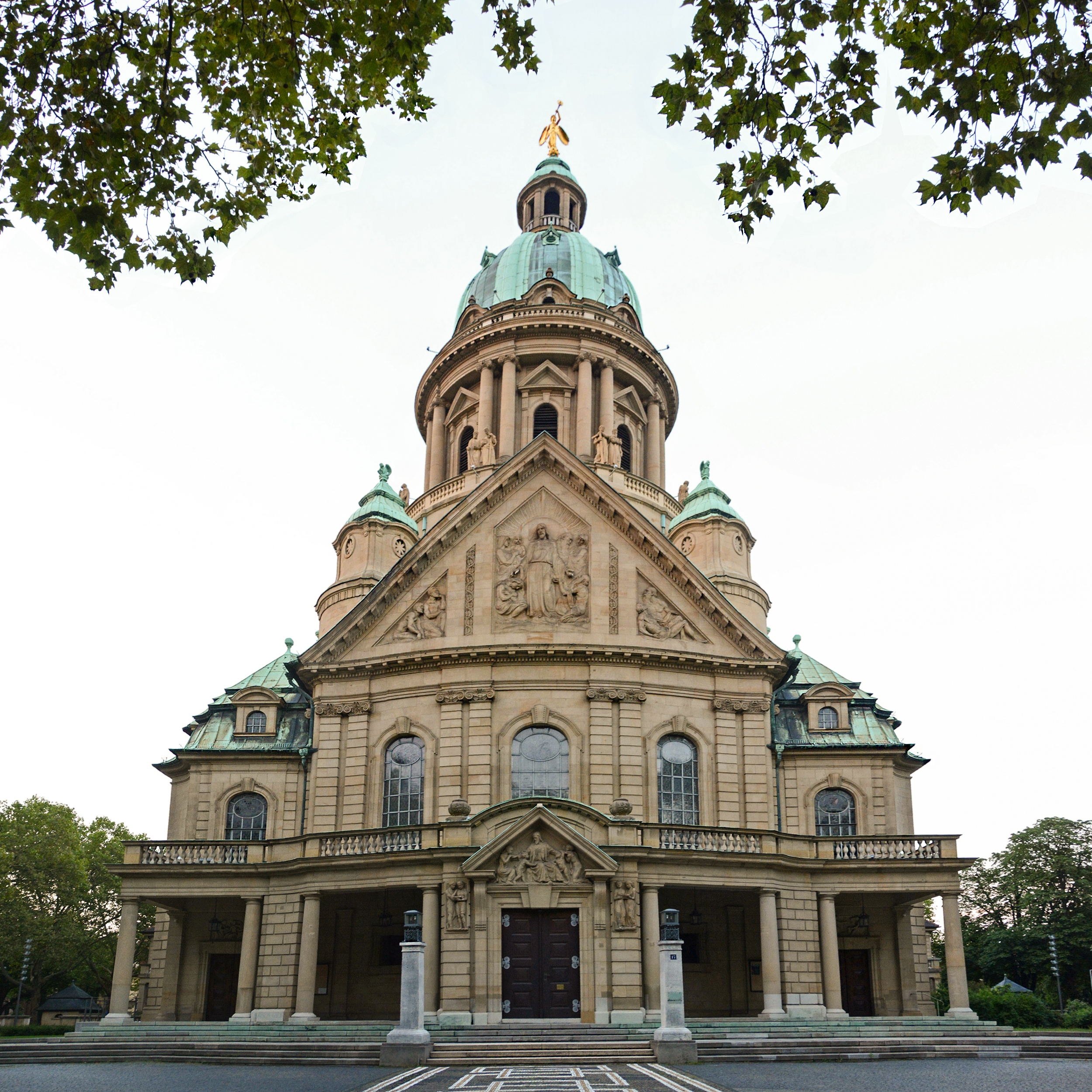
- Christ Church in Mannheim was built between 1907 and 1911 using plans produced by Christian Schrade.
- Born: 29 May 1876; Mehrstetten, Württemberg, Germany
- Died: 10 April 1962 (aged 85); Mannheim, Baden-Württemberg, West Germany
- Occupation: Architect

Christian Schrade (29 May 1876 – 10 April 1962) was a German architect. The focus of his work was on church buildings.

== Life ==
Schrade was born in Mehrstetten, a small village approximately 65 km (40 miles) to the south-east of Stuttgart. His father was a wheelwright.

Between 1896 and 1900 he was a student at the Stuttgart Technical Academy (Stuttgart University) and at the Munich Technical University. His teachers at Stuttgart included Gustav Halmhuber, the man who designed the (locally) iconic Friedrichsplatz Water Tower in Mannheim. He received a two-year travel bursary from the government which enabled him to study Italian Renaissance architecture. After that he was employed by the architectural partnership of Julius Flügge and Carl Nordmann, based in Essen. During this time he assisted with a high profile commission rather closer to his home that the firm had recently taken on, being the new Protestant Memorial Church of the Protestation at Speyer. In 1903 Schrade relocated back from Essen, taking a job as assistant to the Stuttgart church architect Theophil Frey.

At this time the Evangelical Church community were intending to build a high-profile "Central" church in a new quarter of Mannheim. A competition was held between various architects to present proposals for what would become Mannheim's new Christ Church. Theophil Frey won the first prize and on 24 June 1904 was commissioned to work up his winning proposal. Unfortunately, however, Frey died suddenly on 3 August 1904, and it was left to his young assistant to carry the project through to completion. Christ Church was built between 1907 and 1911, following plans prepared by Christian Schrade. Although it was a very early work, it has come to be seen as his most important work.

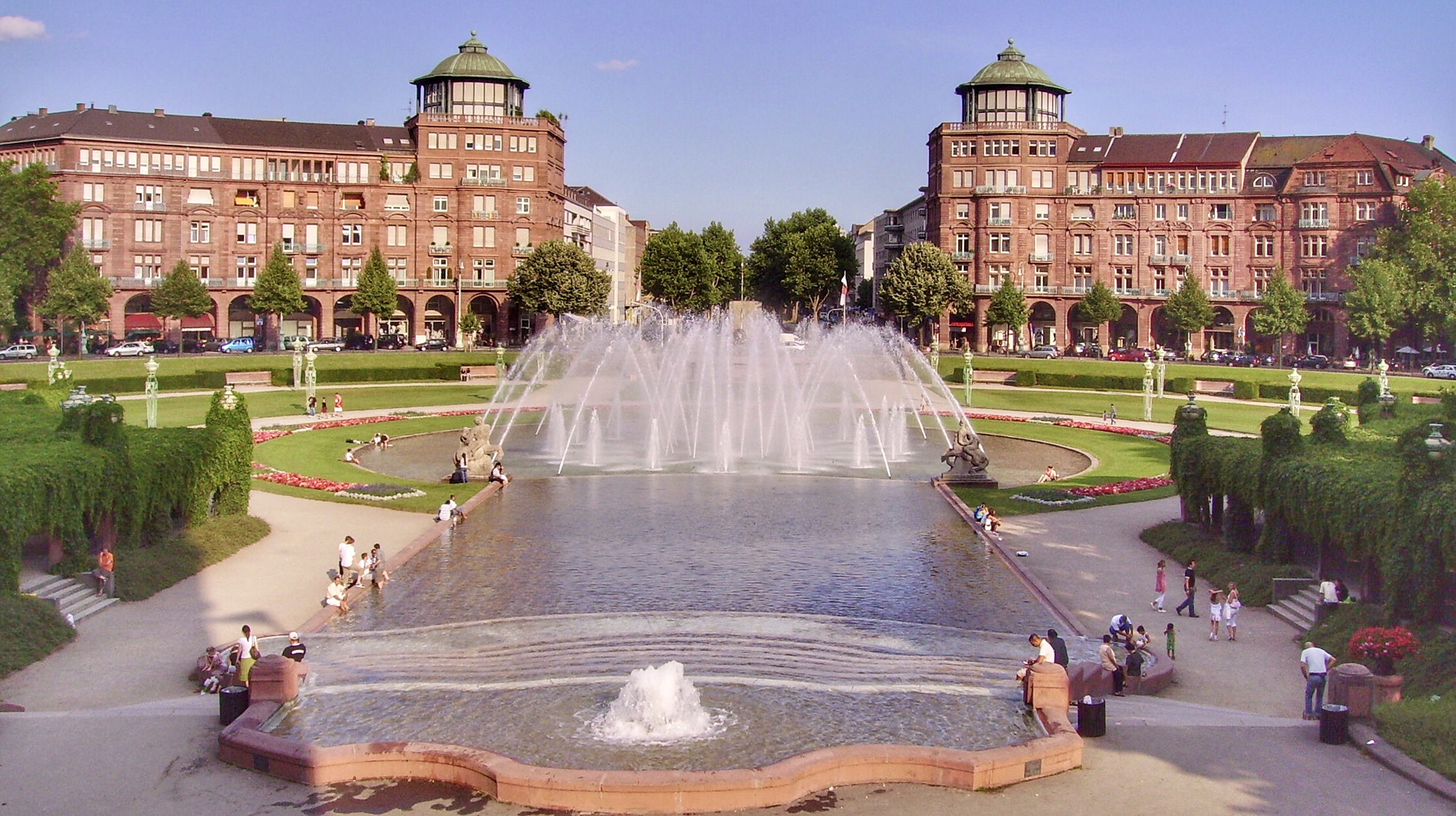
One of Scrade's last projects was the restoration/rebuild of the ( Arkadenhäuser) on Mannheim's Friedrichsplatz

Schrade's later commissions were built in and around Mannheim. They included the GBG Apartment block in Garnisonstraße. His principal focus was on church buildings, however, although there was no return to the prewar exuberant optimism of the Christ Church. His later churches, like the Christ Church, were almost all built for Evangelical congregations. Commissions included the Auferstehungskirche (1936) in the Mannheim Käfertal district and the Thomaskirche (1950) in the city's Neuostheim quarter. Churches commissioned outside Mannheim included one in Steinsfurt and one in Brötzingen (Pforzheim). New church building in the second part of the twentieth century was supported by massive population transfers in 1944/46 from what had before 1945 been the north-eastern eastern part of Germany: the transfers had fueled population growth and increased the proportion of non-Catholic Christians in the south-west of the country. Another of Schrade's projects was the rebuilding of the Evangelical Peace Church on the east side of central Mannheim. His proposal for the Trinity Church was never built, however. For the Trinity Church an uncompromisingly "contemporary" proposal from Helmut Striffler was preferred over Schrode's "Baroque revivalist" vision.

One of his last projects involved the restoration/rebuild of the Arcade Apartments ( Arkadenhäuser) in Mannheim, across the Friedrichsplatz from the Water Tower designed by his early mentor, Gustav Halmhuber.
