= Johann Forster =

German theologian (1496–1558)

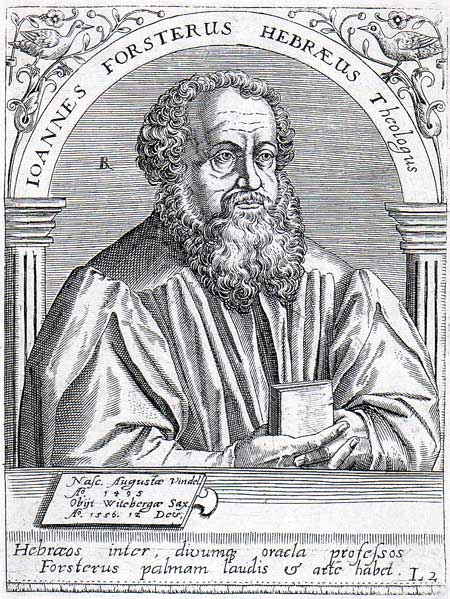
Johann Forster.

Johann Forster Forsterus, Förster or Forstheim (10 July 1495, in Augsburg - 8 December 1556, in Wittenberg) was a Lutheran theologian, Protestant reformer and professor of Hebrew. He took part in the Protestation at Speyer.

Johann-Forster studied Hebrew at the University of Ingolstadt under Johannes Reuchlin and continued his studies at the University of Leipzig and the University of Wittenberg. Being 24 years old, he was appointed professor for Hebrew at Zwickau in Saxony in 1525. He married his wife Margarethe née Fischer in Leipzig in the same year. After Zwickau, his next waystations then included Wittenberg (preacher and deacon 1530-1535), Augsburg (preacher 1535-1538), Tübingen (professor for Hebrew 1538-1541, here he became Dr. theol.), Regensburg (church reformer 1541-1543), Nuremberg (provost 1541, 1543), Schleusingen (church reformer 1544-1547), Merseburg (superintendent 1548-1549) and finally Wittenberg again (preacher and professor for Hebrew and theology, 1549 onward).

He was petitioned by Martin Luther to help him with the translation of the bible into German and became an esteemed guest at his house in Wittenberg in the early 1530s, being especially useful because of his knowledge of Hebrew. Forster lost several of his positions due to the zeal with which he pursued Lutheran theology, namely those of Augsburg and Tübingen, but he remained amicably with other employers like the counts of Henneberg-Schleusingen despite such differences.

His magnum opus was a Hebrew Lexicon (Dictionarium hebraicum novum) which he finalized in his last years in Wittenberg, and which was published posthumously in 1557 in Basel.
