= Gedächtniskirche, Speyer =

Coordinates: 49°18′53″N 8°25′48″E

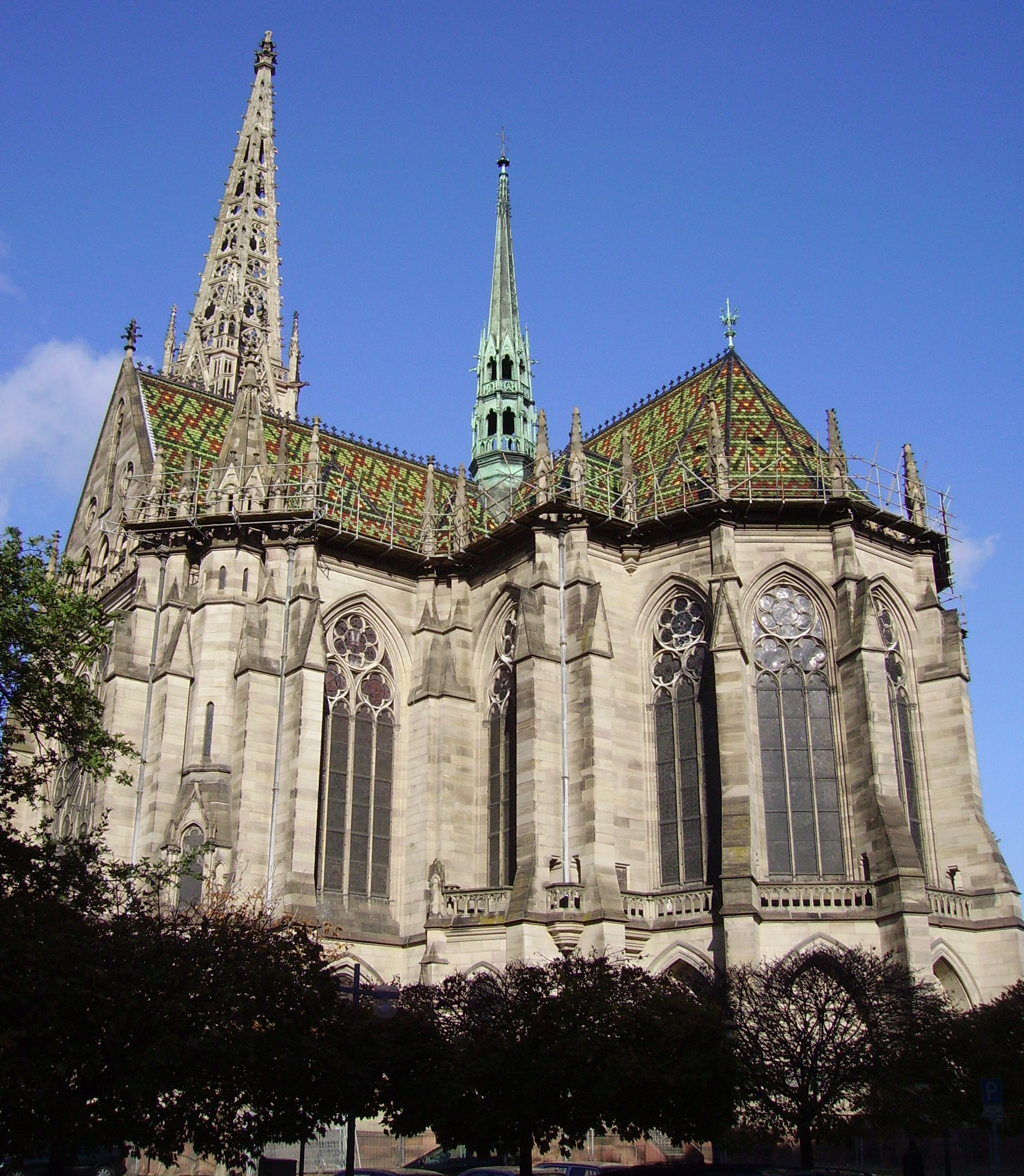
Gedächtniskirche from the south-east

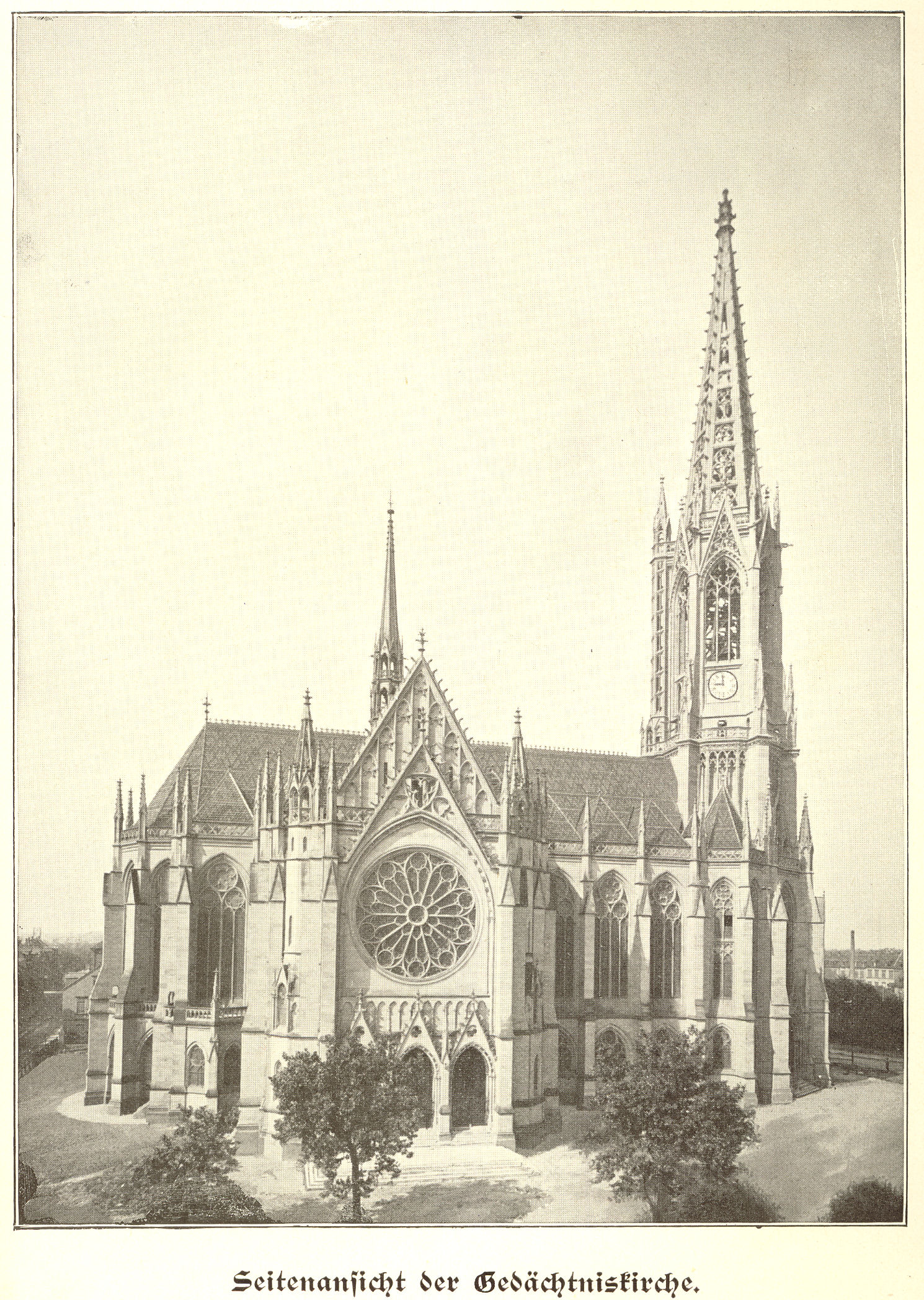
Gedächtniskirche in 1904

The Gedächtniskirche der Protestation (English: The Memorial Church of the Protestation) is a United Protestant church of both Lutheran and Reformed confessions in Speyer, Rhineland-Palatinate, Germany, that commemorates the Protestation at Speyer in defense of the evangelical faith, specifically Lutheranism. Built between 1893 and 1904, the church was constructed in memory of the protest that took place at the Diet of Speyer by the Protestant rulers of the Holy Roman Empire in 1529. The tower is the tallest bell tower in the whole Palatinate at 100 metres (330 ft).

== Historical background ==
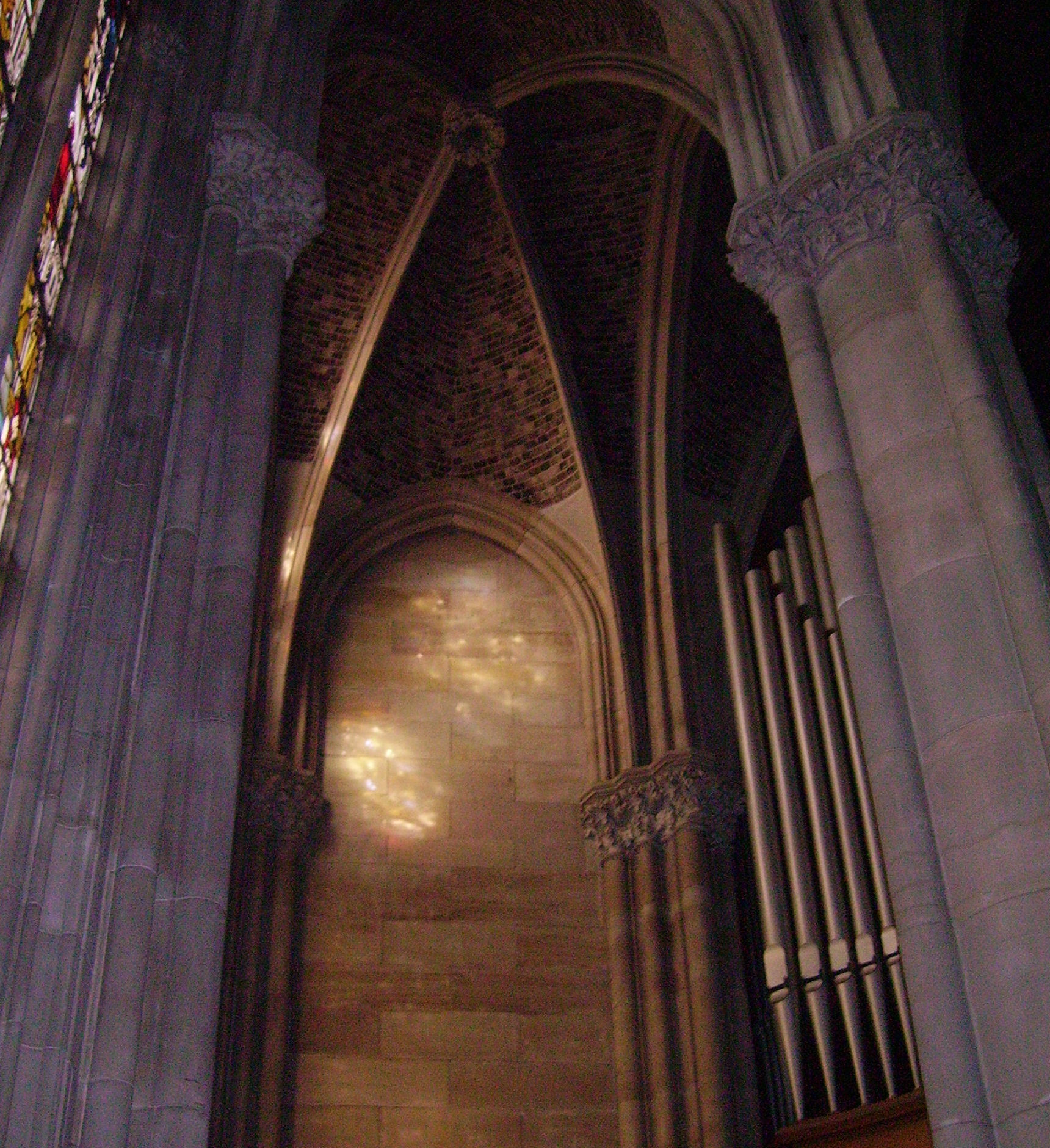
Inside the church

In the latter part of the nineteenth century during the time of the Kulturkampf, relations between Protestants and Catholics were strained. The Gedächtniskirche was intended as a mother church for Protestant Christianity, although debates among the Protestants led to a delay of about 35 years between the original idea and the laying of the foundations.

The building of the memorial church was a reaction to Johann von Schraudolph's structural renewal and painting of Speyer Cathedral in the years 1846 to 1856. Originally the intention was to renovate the Baroque Trinity Church, situated near the cathedral, but it was decided that a new building should be built instead.

In the decorative rose window, the protest is tied historically to events from the Old and New Testaments of the Christian Bible.

== Construction ==
At first, the reformation church was planned to be built on the site of the "Retscher", a ruin of an old manor house belonging to the family Retschelin, near the Trinity church. It was believed that this was the site of the 1529 Diet. In order to build the so-called Retscher Church, a building union was founded. With the permission of the Bavarian King Maximilian II the union launched a public fundraising drive in 1857. Because the Protestants were also financing the Luther Monument in Worms, the donations were quite meagre. The Luther monument was unveiled in 1868, in the presence of the Prussian king and the crown prince, who would later become Emperor Wilhelm I. The parish in Speyer used this event to make contact with the Prussian royal house, which would later become very valuable.

After it was revealed that the Diet of 1529 had not taken place in the so-called Retscher, the project broke ties to the Old Town. In 1883, the "Association for building the Memorial church of the 1529 Protestation" decided on the current location of the church. The announcement of the dogma of papal infallibility gave new life to the project in 1870, along with the foundation of the German Empire under a Lutheran emperor in 1871.

The builders were determined that the Protestant church should not be eclipsed by the cathedral, which required that its design had to be completely different from that of the Romanesque Cathedral. Forty-five architects from throughout the German empire applied for the call to tender. The five finalist architects all favoured the neo-Gothic style of architecture. The decision was made in 1884 in favour of the architectural partnership of Julius Flügge and Carl Nordmann from Essen.

== Architecture ==
As the funds for the building were not yet ready in 1890, the building association turned to the Protestant Emperor Wilhelm II, who promised to ensure the completion of the church. Another main benefactor of the church was Henry Villard. On 24 August 1893 the laying of the foundation stone took place. After eleven years of building, the memorial church was finally consecrated on 31 August 1904.

The church represents the doctrinary neo-Gothic style, and uses relatively pure historical forms. It was mostly modelled on the churches of the Viennese neo-Gothic style, particularly the Vienna Votivkirche, built between 1856 and 1879.

=== Dimensions ===
- Overall length of church and tower: 72 metres (236 ft)
- Overall length of the church inside: 51 metres (167 ft)
- Width in the nave: 24 metres (79 ft)
- Width in the transverse house: 45 metres (148 ft)
- Inside surface area: 1,200 square metres (13,000 sq ft)
- Height of the arch in the central nave: 22 metres (72 ft), in the intersection: 24 metres (79 ft), in the aisles: 20 metres (66 ft)
- Tower height: 100 metres (330 ft)

=== Site ===
The church is located to the southwest of the city of Speyer, outside the old city walls, in front of the former Landau Gate, where in the 19th century a new suburb with houses in the Wilhelminian style developed.

=== Materials and Design ===
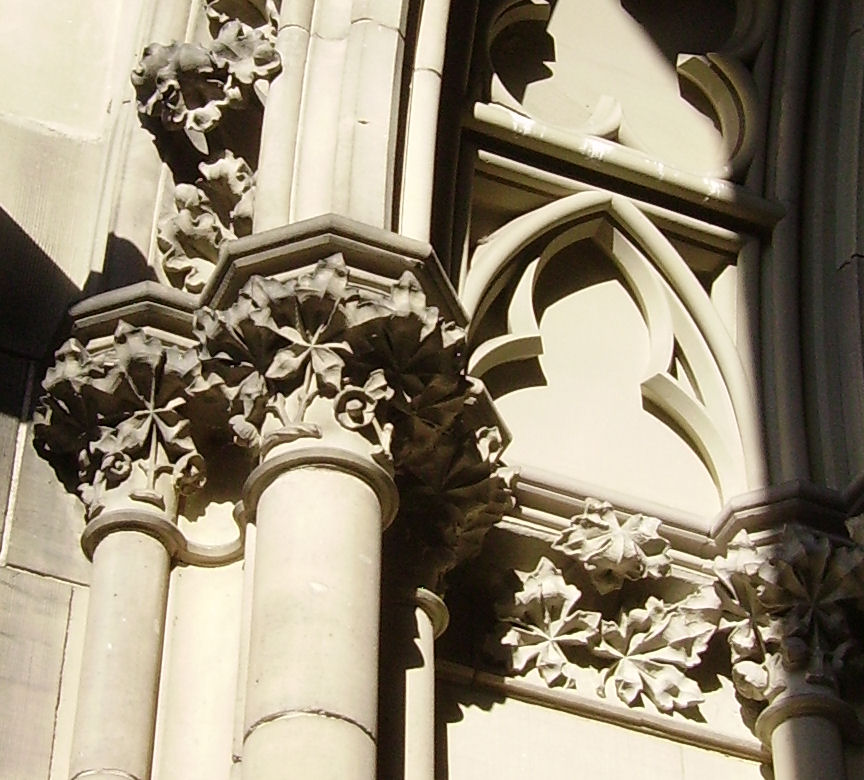
Construction materials

The building stones were very carefully chosen. Several quarries were researched. The red sandstone from Weidenthal that was used for the foundations could not be used for further building as it was riddled with pebble stones and therefore not suitable for statuary work. It was also feared that the red sandstone would get darker through weathering, whereas the whitish-grey sandstone from Vogesen would retain its pale colour. The quarry in Lauterecken could not be used because the strata were too low and it was impossible to cut large slabs. A total of 6,622 cubic metres (233,900 cu ft) quarry stone and 1,935 cubic metres (68,300 cu ft) wallstones were delivered.

The idea of a slated roof was abandoned, because this would have required frequent repairs. Instead, the roof was laid with glazed tiles, fixed with copper wire.

The church consists of an arched vault with 3 naves over the outline of a Latin cross. Because of their lighter weight, the arches are built of artificial tuff stones. The 100 metres (330 ft) high bell tower stands in front of the short nave, with the Memorial Hall in its ground floor.

The facades have no steady contours. In the spirit of the Gothic style, it is dominated by the split form, which doesn't leave any larger surfaces, but instead surrounds the whole structure with alternating with abutments and window hinges. The roofs are covered with different coloured glazed tiles that build small diamond patterns.

=== Memorial Hall ===
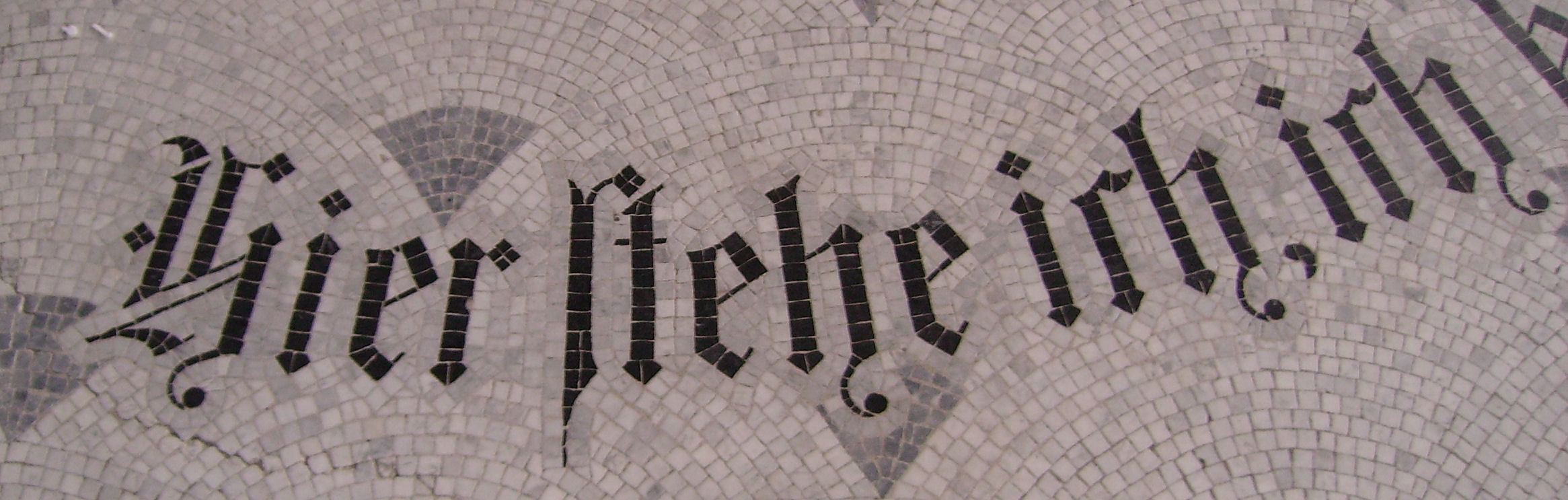
"Hier stehe ich..."

The Memorial Hall is situated in the ground floor of the tower. Like the tower, this has a hexagonal layout. It was a deliberate choice to situate the Memorial Hall in front of the main entrance, as that was the only place where visitors to the church can see the witnesses of the Protest, as their statues were not allowed to be situated in the interior of the church.

A bronze likeness of Martin Luther stands on a pedestal made of Swedish granite in the centre of the Memorial Hall. This was a donation from the German-American Lutherans. In his left hand Luther is holding an open Bible, and his right hand is formed into a fist. With his right foot he is stamping on the papal bull of excommunication. Sunk into the ground are the words to remind of Luther's appearance at the Diet of Worms in 1521 ("Hier stehe ich, ich kann nicht anders, Gott helfe mir. Amen!", which mean "Here I stand. I can do nothing else, God help me. Amen.")

Statues of the six princes who protested at the Diet of Speyer on 19 April 1529 are situated on six further pedestals:

1. Elector of Saxony, John the Constant
2. Ernest I, Duke of Brunswick-Lüneburg
3. Duke Franz of Braunschweig-Lüneburg
4. Prince Wolfgang of Anhalt
5. George, Margrave of Brandenburg-Ansbach
6. Philip I, Landgrave of Hesse

At the intersections of the archway ridges in the archway are the coats of arms of the subscribers. In the haunches of the neighbouring portals are the coats of arms of the 14 Imperial cities which affiliated themselves with the Speyer Protest (Strassburg, Augsburg, Ulm, Constance, Lindau, Memmingen, Kempten, Nördlingen, Heilbronn, Reutlingen, Isny, St. Gallen, Weißenburg and Windsheim).

=== Main Portal ===
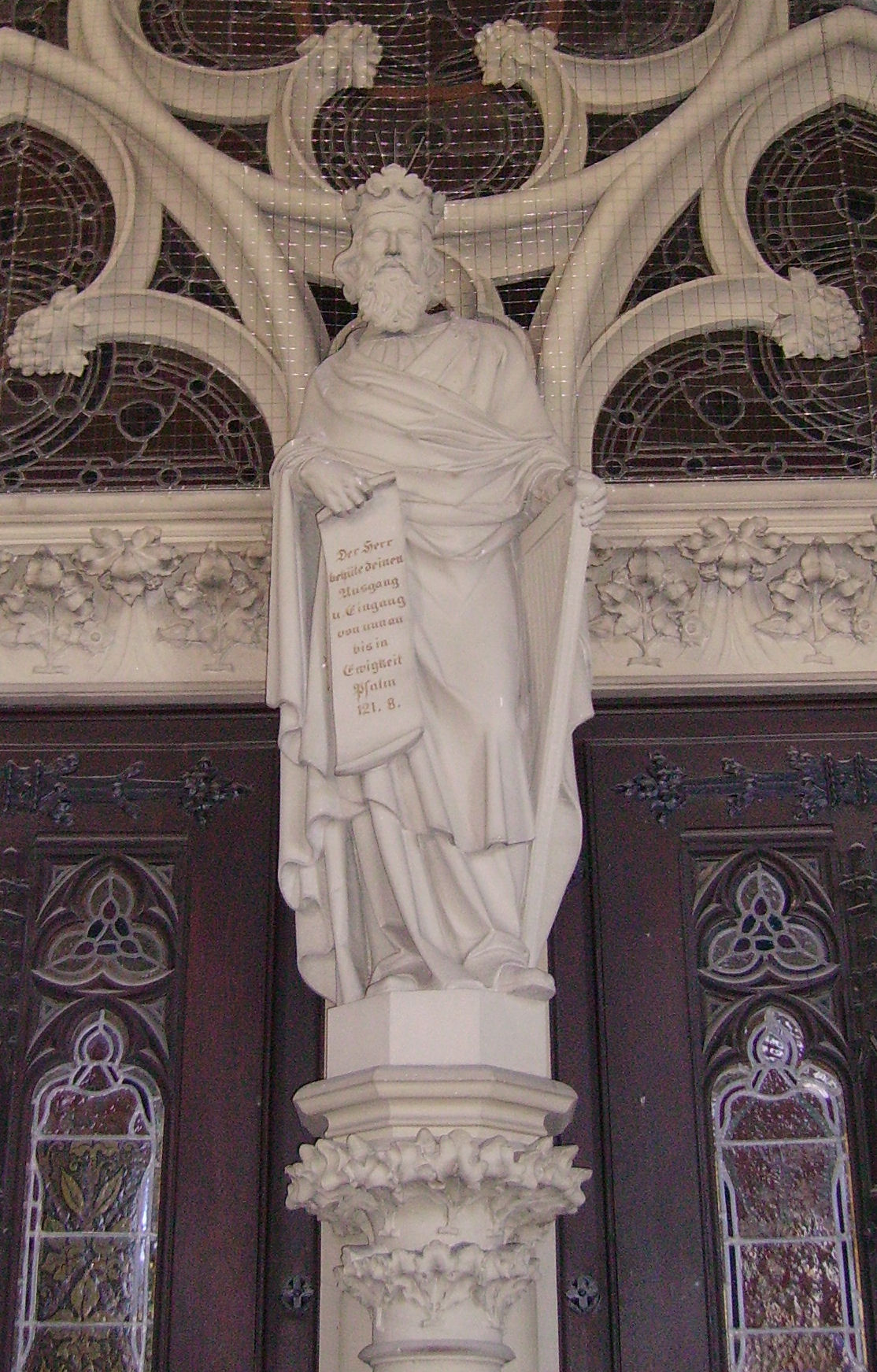
David

The two parts of the main portal include on the middle column a sandstone figure of King David with his harp, who greets visitors to the church with a psalm on a scroll, and draws attention to the importance of music in the Protestant church:

"The Lord will guard your going out and coming in From this time forth and forevermore. " Psalm 121 verse 8

On the inside of the portal an angel stands with an open book, warning visitors as they leave to heed God's word:

"Blessed are they that hear the word of God and keep it"

=== The interior ===
The interior differs from a medieval cathedral in that there is no plastering or painting. Pillars and walls are similarly bare, and the only colour comes from the glass painting.

==== The 36 Windows ====
As with Gothic cathedrals, the colourfully designed window panes are an integral component of the construction. The windows originate from nine well-known studios across various cities of the then German empire. All 36 windows are created in the historism style.

The main window in the apse was donated by the last German imperial couple, Wilhelm II and his wife Auguste Victoria. This is why the chancel is also known as the Emperor's Chorus. The seven angel's heads in the three middle windows are portraits of the Emperor's children. Wilhelm II had this to say on this representation of his children: "Before they were seven little rascals, today they are angels." German: Früher war'n dat mal sieben Bengelchen, heute sind es Engelchen.

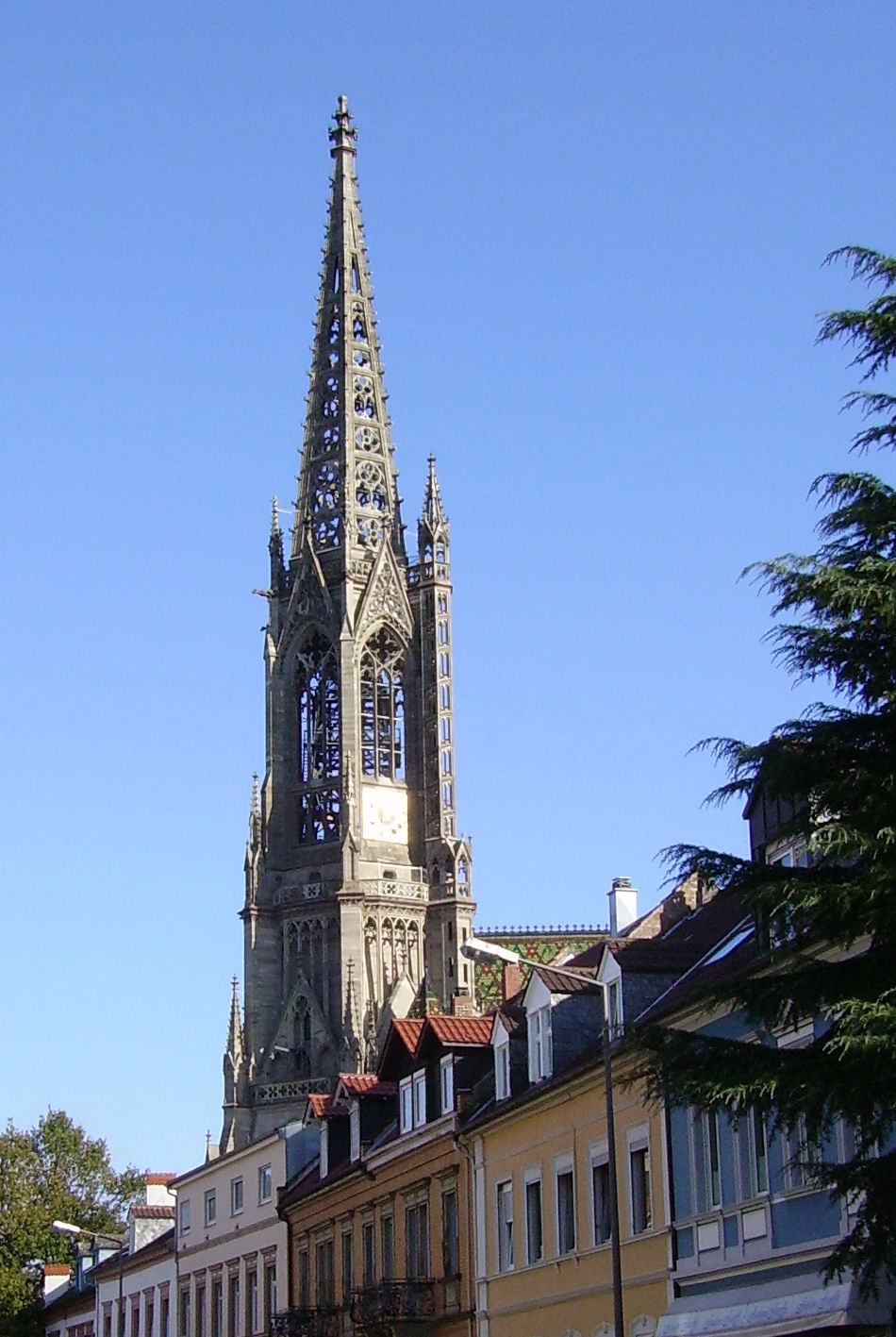
Spire from the south-east

===== Ground floor =====
1 Death bed of a Christian woman, which is a symbol of the virtue of Hope
2 The sacrifice of Isaac by his father Abraham is a symbol of the virtue of Faith
3 The work of deaconesses is a symbol of the virtue of Love
4 The burial of Jesus
5 `Protest at Speyer' (1529) with John of Saxony and Jakob Sturm in 1529, the main reason for the construction of the church.
6 `Defiant Worms' (1521) with Georg von Frundsberg and Landgrave Philip of Hesse reminds of Luther's appearance before the Diet of Worms in 1521
7 Whitsun
8 Twelve-year-old Jesus in the Temple links with the scholarliness of Melanchthon in the neighbouring window
9 `Confessing Augsburg' (1530) with Philip Melanchthon and Chancellor Dr. Christian Baier reminds of the Confessio Augustana of 1530
10 `Sorrowing Magdeburg' (1631) with the Swedish king Gustav II Adolf and the Magdeburg Cathedral preacher Dr. Reinhardt Bake reminds of the destruction of Magedbury by Tilly in the Thirty Years War.
11 Jesus heals the sick man at the Pool of Bethesda, one of Jesus's healing miracles
12 Jesus with Mary and Martha
13 The Capernaum Centurion
14 The stoning of Stephen

===== Vestibule =====
15 Duke Ludwig II of Pfalz-Zweibrücken and Elector Ottheinrich of the Palatinate
16 Luther burning the bull of excommunication (1520)
17 Elector Friedrich the Wise of Saxony and Franz von Sickingen

===== Above the galleries =====
18 The calling of the prophet Isaiah
19 The calling of the apostle Paul
20 Farel calling Calvin to Geneva (1536)
21 The crucifixion
22 Left-hand transept rosette: Martyr window
23 Easter morning (angel and women at the empty tomb)
24 Baptism window: Jesus blessing the children
25 The Reformers Philip Melanchthon and Martin Luther
26 The Apostle Paul
27 Christ resurrected and bestowing his blessing
28 The Apostle John
29 The Reformers Zwingli and Calvin
30 Communion window: Elector Joachim II. of Brandenburg and his wife receiving for the first time Communion in both kinds (Berlin 1539)
31 Christmas (The proclamation by the angel to the shepherds)
32 Right-hand transept rosette: Mission window
33 Jesus in Gethsemane
34 Luther posting the theses (Wittenberg 1517)
35 The Sermon on the Mount
36 Moses receiving the Ten Commandments on Sinai

==== Pulpit ====
The pulpit at the altar is a more recent addition. It was created by the Palatinate sculptor Gernot Rumpf, who, as in other areas, has shown his sense of humour here. It represents a net, and is a play on the words that Jesus said to Peter: "From now on, you will be a fisher of men."

For this reason, there is a net hanging from the pulpit, in which fish have been caught in the shape of those legendary Palatinate figures, the Elwetrischen. The fattest fish with an open book is Martin Luther, and this fish with plaits next to him is his wife, Katherina von Bora.

==== Lectern ====
The lectern is characterised by a grand structure with a variety of materials. Around the main part there are four bronze reliefs, representing the birth, baptism, crucifixion and resurrection of Christ. The top is made of oak in the style of a gothic sacristy. Already shortly after the opening of the church the lectern was seen as too flamboyant, but it was never removed or simplified.

The base of the lectern consists of different coloured marble. The lectern was donated by the American railway magnate John Pierpont Morgan, and the columns were a gift from fellow New Yorker William Ziegler.

==== Seating ====
The oak pews have decorations on the ends, which echo those around the church building, along with the arms and names of their benefactors. There are 1,800 seats in total.

==== Organ ====
The original organ is no longer available. This was begun in 1900 by the Stuttgart Organ company C. F. Weigle, and was finished by the Öttingen Firm Steinmeyer in 1902. It had 65 sounding registers, divided across four manuals and a pedal. This organ was sacrificed during refurbishments in 1938–39. The current organ came from the Organ workshop D. Kleuker in Bielefeld in 1979. Its 97 registers make it the largest organ in south-west Germany. The completely plain backdrop from 1939 is still intact, and was designed by the Munich sculptor Hans Miller.

See the German Wikipedia page for specifications: Orgel

==== Bells ====
The original bells were cast by Franz Schilling in Apolda in 1900–1903. The 9,150-kilogram (20,170 lb) main bell (donated by the Emperor) was destroyed in the so-called Glockenfriedhof ("Bell cemetery") in Hamburg in 1942. The four remaining bells returned to the church after the end of the war, but after their ordeal they were of such a poor quality that a whole new peal was cast by the Karlsruhe foundery the Brothers Bachert in 1959.

The eight bells, funded through donations, were named after well-known Reformation figures, along with the Swedish King Gustav II Adolf:

1. Martin Luther

7,540 kilograms (16,620 lb) − 2.33 metres (7 ft 8 in) − f°

2. Johannes Calvin

4,452 kilograms (9,815 lb) − 1.95 metres (6 ft 5 in) − a♭°

3. Huldrych Zwingli

2,530 kilograms (5,580 lb) − 1.59 metres (5 ft 3 in) − c’

4. Gustav II Adolf

1,578 kilograms (3,479 lb) − 1.33 metres (4 ft 4 in) − e♭’

5. Philipp Melanchthon

1,106 kilograms (2,438 lb) − 1.16 metres (3 ft 10 in) − f’

6. Martin Butzer

729 kilograms (1,607 lb) − 1.00 metre (3 ft 3 in) − a♭’

7. Zacharias Ursinus

627 kilograms (1,382 lb) − 0.93 metres (3 ft 1 in) − b♭’

8. Johannes Bader

443 kilograms (977 lb) − 0.83 metres (2 ft 9 in) − c’’

=== The Josephskirche ===
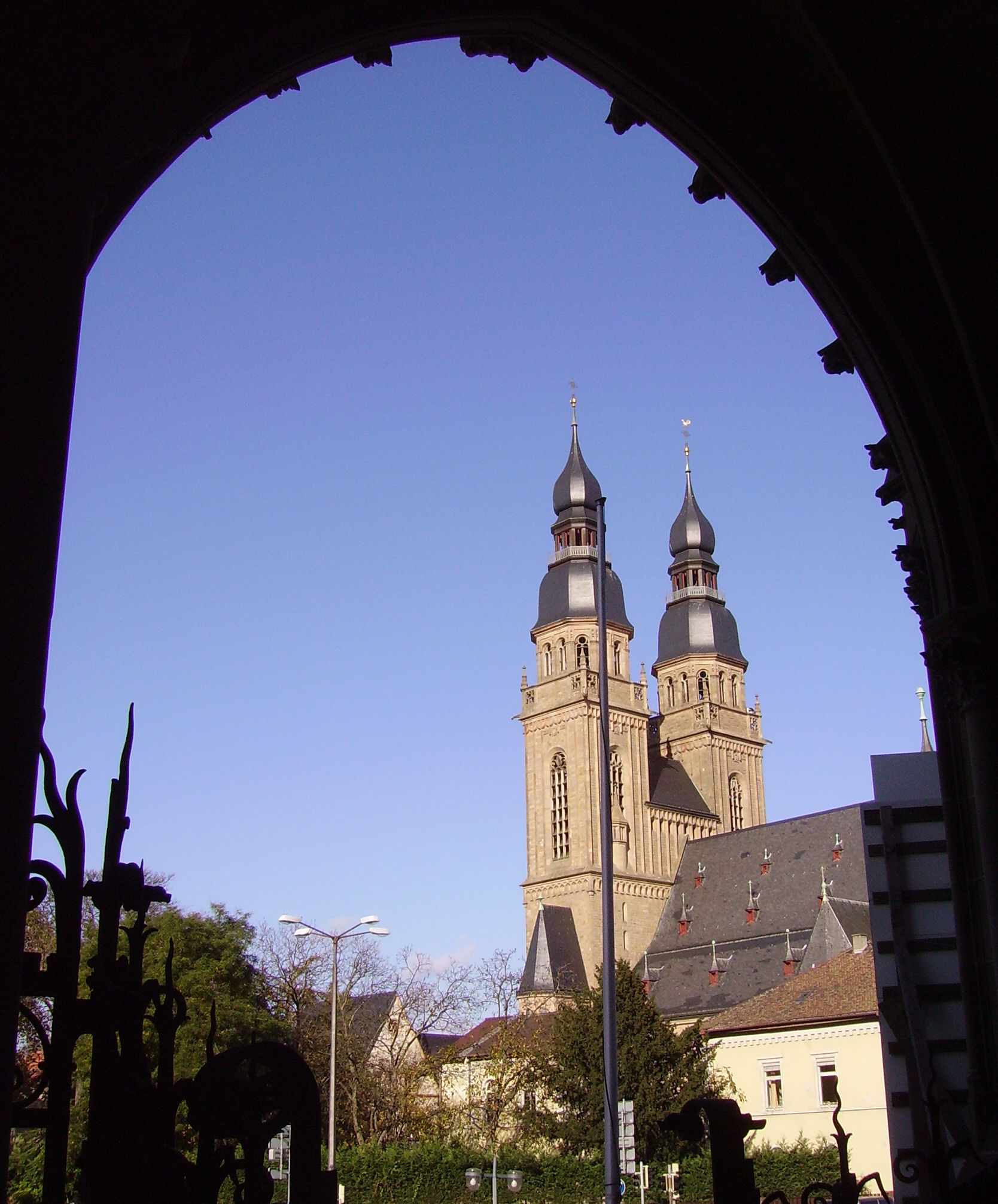
Josephskirche

The Catholics, too, were not keen on the "Protestant Cathedral". When the Building Association of the Gedächtniskirche acquired its site at what was then the edge of the city, the Catholics endeavoured to find a site in immediate proximity. Thus, a Catholic church building association was founded in 1887, and the foundation stone was laid in 1912 near the Gedächtniskirche. Already in 1914 the church could be consecrated in honour of the patron of the Electorate of the Palatinate and the patron saint of the workers, Joseph.

In terms of the architectural style of St Joseph as opposed to the Gedächtniskirche it was said to be: "Catholic variety compared to Protestant austerity". The Mainz cathedral builder Ludwig Becker developed the plan, including influence from Art Nouveau, late Gothic, Baroque and the Renaissance. The Josephskirche was meant to be in stark contrast to the Speyer cathedral and the Gedächtniskirche.

As a particular provocation against the Protestants, the bottom half of the right middle window above the high altar is a proclamation of the dogma of papal infallibility, as this was the motive for the building of the Gedächtniskirche.

=== Emperor William II ===
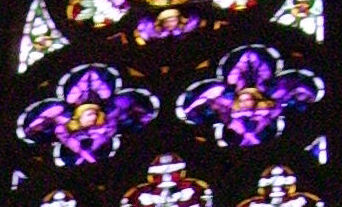
children of the imperial household

One of the firm supporters of the building was the Prussian imperial family. The five large windows of the choir are also known as the "imperial choir", because they were donated by Emperor William II and his wife Auguste Viktoria. William II preferred the Romanesque style of building, because of the French origins of Gothic.

=== Karl Barth ===
In the 1950s, there were plans to completely replace the church windows, which no longer fit in with the prevailing taste. Critics included Swiss theologian Karl Barth, who, after a visit to the church, stated that "in the war, there was one bomb too few that fell in Speyer".

=== Situation today ===
The Gedächtniskirche is now the main church of the Evangelical Church of the Palatinate, whose main administrative centre is situated very close to the Speyer cathedral.

To celebrate its centenary in 2004, a huge investment was made to renovate the Gedächtniskirche. This led to some displeasure among the followers of the Evangelical Church of the Palatinate, as the remaining parishes had to restrict their building work due to budgetary problems.
