= History of Lutheranism =

Lutheranism as a religious movement originated in the early 16th century Holy Roman Empire as an attempt to reform the Catholic Church. The movement originated with the call for a public debate regarding several issues within the Catholic Church by Martin Luther, then a professor of Bible at the young University of Wittenberg. Lutheranism soon became a wider religious and political movement within the Holy Roman Empire owing to support from key electors and the widespread adoption of the printing press. This movement soon spread throughout northern Europe and became the driving force behind the wider Protestant Reformation. Today, Lutheranism has spread from Europe to all six populated continents.

== Roots of Reformation (15th century) ==
The 15th century saw many changes in European society, each of which can be attributed as a contributor to the academic and political climate that allowed for the spread of the Lutheran movement. Many religious movements prior to Martin Luther had promoted ideas that he came to adopt including the Hussites, Waldensians, and followers of Girolamo Savonarola. Importantly, the conditions created by the Renaissance allowed thinkers such as Desiderius Erasmus to question the role and nature of the Church itself.

== Societal upheaval in Europe ==
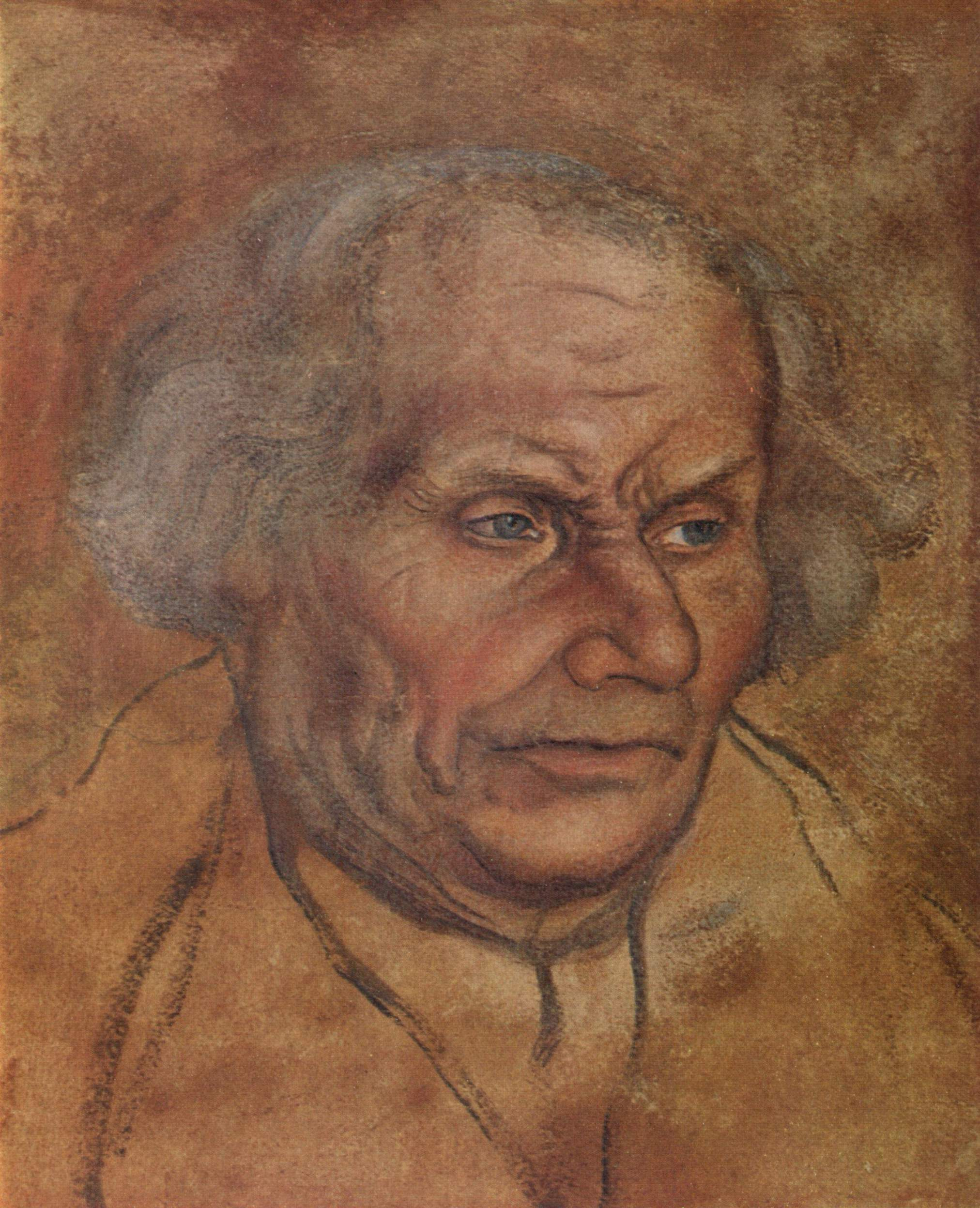
Luther's father, Hans, by Lucas Cranach the Elder

At the beginning of the 16th century, the European continent had seen vast changes in the ordering of society and culture in the last 200 years. The dramatic loss of population due to the Black Death had created new economic opportunities and mobility among the lower classes of society. New technologies came about to address labor shortages and the need to increase productivity, which in turn created new classes of society to support manufacture and trade. Hans Luther, the father of Martin Luther, was a member of this new middle class. Hans Luther made a living leasing and operating copper mines and smelters. The Luther family enjoyed enough income and social status that it was possible for Hans to envision a university education and career as a lawyer for his son.

The 14th century had also produced upheaval in the Roman Catholic Church with the resolution of the Western Schism in the early part of the century, the controversies surrounding the papacies of the Renaissance era and new pressures brought by the invasions of Christendom by the burgeoning Ottoman Empire.

=== Spread of literacy ===
The spread of books and higher education had an obvious impact on the Lutheran reformers. The Gutenberg Bible was first printed in 1455, with subsequent editions of the Bible and other books quickly becoming available in wider distribution than ever before. Along with the spread of the book, universities were becoming the centers of a new academic culture that existed outside of the immediate control of the Roman Catholic Church. In 1502, Frederick III, Elector of Saxony, founded the University of Wittenberg, a university that would house a young Augustinian friar as a "Professor of Bible" named Martin Luther.

== The start of the Reformation ==
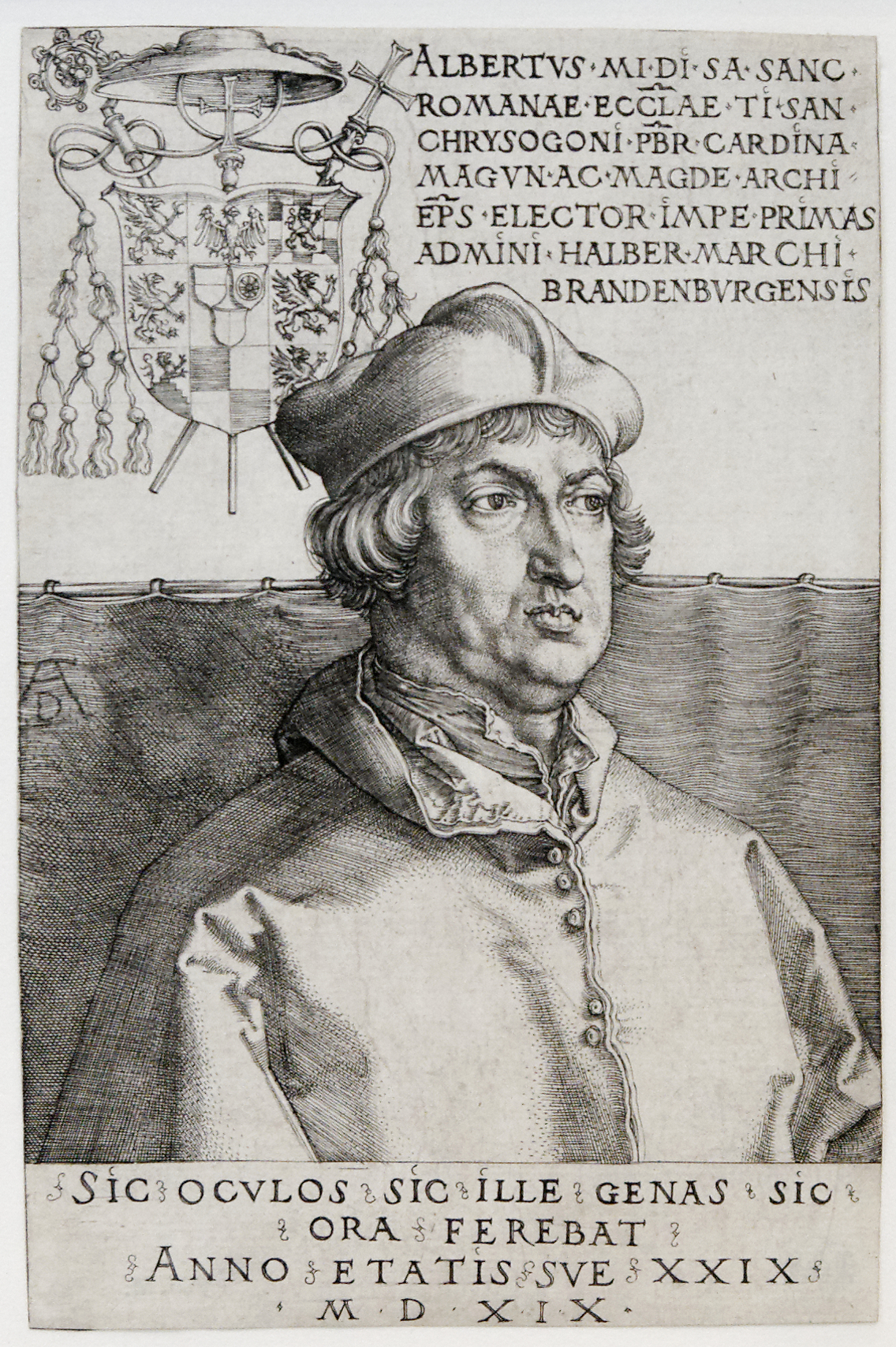
Cardinal Albrecht of Hohenzollern, Archbishop of Mainz and Magdeburg, was using part of the indulgence income to pay bribery debts; portrait by Albrecht Dürer, 1519

The sale of indulgences shown in A Question to a Mintmaker, woodcut by Jörg Breu the Elder of Augsburg, c. 1530

In 1516–17, Johann Tetzel, a Dominican friar and papal commissioner for indulgences, was sent to Germany by the Roman Catholic Church to sell indulgences to raise money to rebuild St Peter's Basilica in Rome.

On 31 October 1517, Luther wrote to Albrecht, Archbishop of Mainz and Magdeburg, protesting the sale of indulgences. He enclosed in his letter a copy of his "Disputation of Martin Luther on the Power and Efficacy of Indulgences," which came to be known as the Ninety-five Theses. Hans Hillerbrand writes that Luther had no intention of confronting the church, but saw his disputation as a scholarly objection to church practices, and the tone of the writing is accordingly "searching, rather than doctrinaire." Hillerbrand writes that there is nevertheless an undercurrent of challenge in several of the theses, particularly in Thesis 86, which asks: "Why does the pope, whose wealth today is greater than the wealth of the richest Crassus, build the basilica of St. Peter with the money of poor believers rather than with his own money?"

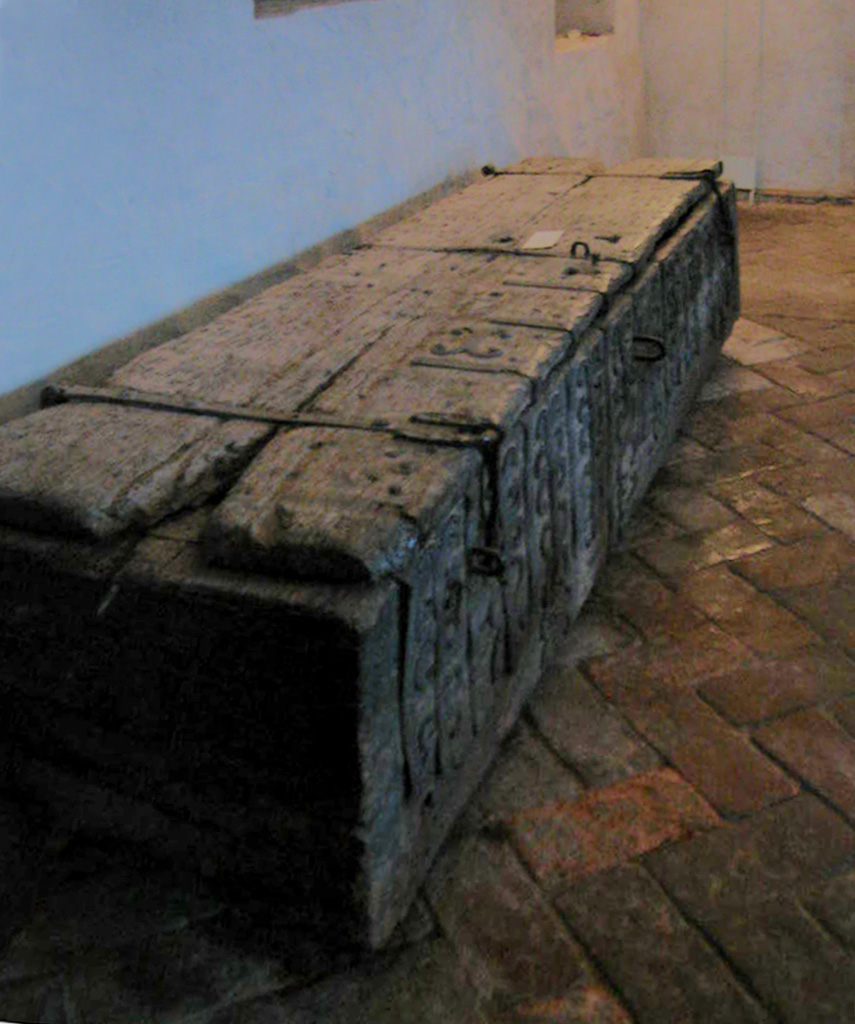
Tetzel's coffer, on display at the St. Nicholaus church in Jüterbog (article in German).

Luther objected to a saying attributed to Johann Tetzel that "As soon as the coin in the coffer rings, the soul from purgatory springs," insisting that, since forgiveness was God's alone to grant, those who claimed that indulgences absolved buyers from all punishments and granted them salvation were in error. Christians, he said, must not slacken in following Christ on account of such false assurances.

According to Philipp Melanchthon, writing in 1546, Luther nailed a copy of the Ninety-five Theses to the door of the Castle Church in Wittenberg that same day—church doors acting as the bulletin boards of his time—an event now seen as sparking the Protestant Reformation, and celebrated each year on 31 October as Reformation Day. Some scholars have questioned the accuracy of Melanchthon's account, noting that no contemporaneous evidence exists for it. Others have countered that no such evidence is necessary, because this was the customary way of advertising an event on a university campus in Luther's day.

The Ninety-five Theses were quickly translated from Latin into German, printed, and widely copied, making the controversy one of the first in history to be aided by the printing press. Within two weeks, the theses had spread throughout Germany; within two months throughout Europe.

=== Justification by faith ===
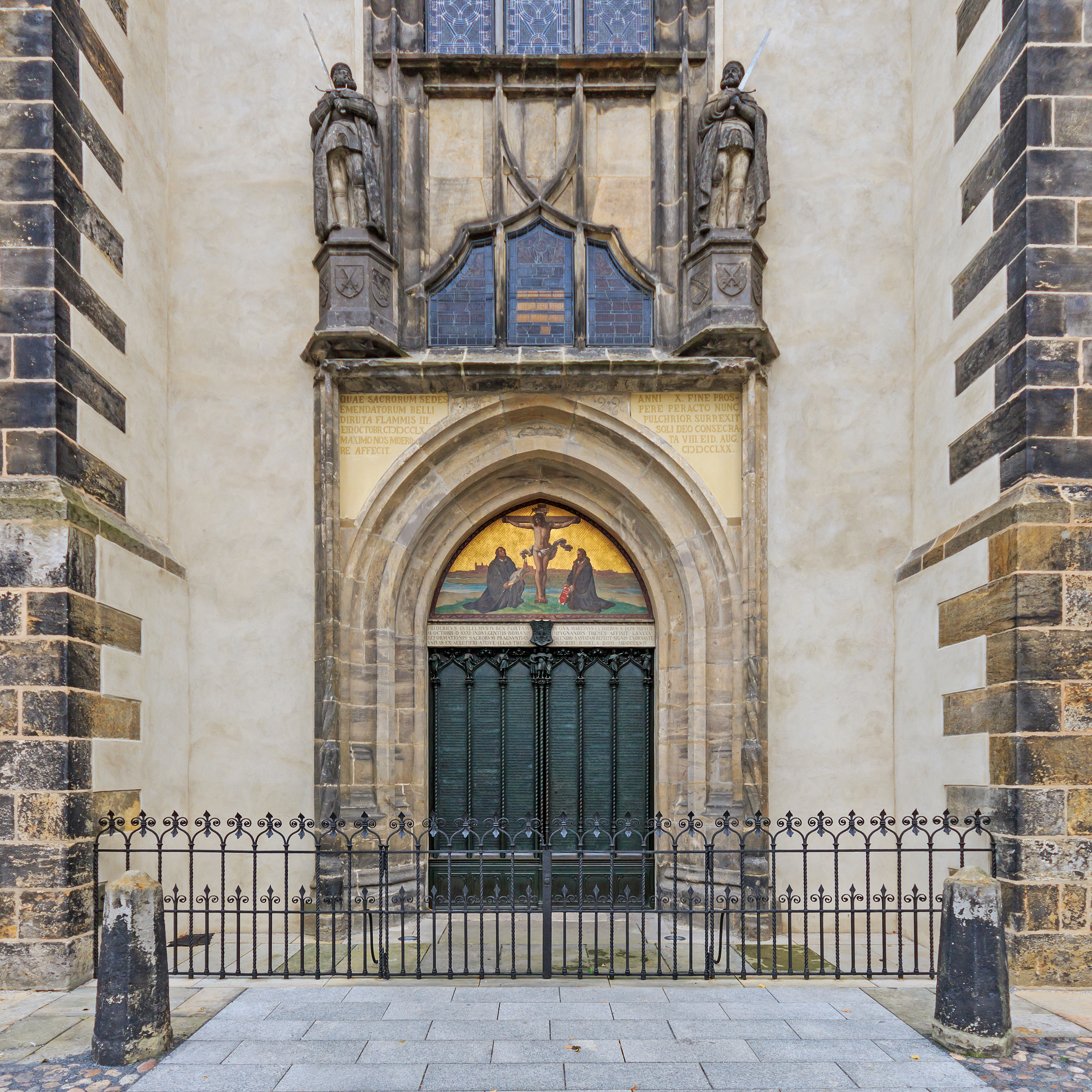
Door of the Schlosskirche (castle church) in Wittenberg to which Luther is said to have nailed his 95 Theses

From 1510 to 1520, Luther lectured on the Psalms, the books of Hebrews, Romans, and Galatians. As he studied these portions of the Bible, he came to view the use of terms such as penance and righteousness by the Roman Catholic Church in new ways. He became convinced that the church was corrupt in its ways and had lost sight of what he saw as several of the central truths of Christianity, the most important of which, for Luther, was the doctrine of justification—God's act of declaring a sinner righteous—by faith alone through God's grace. He began to teach that salvation or redemption is a gift of God's grace, attainable only through faith in Jesus as the messiah. "This one and firm rock, which we call the doctrine of justification," he wrote, "is the chief article of the whole Christian doctrine, which comprehends the understanding of all godliness".

Luther came to understand justification as entirely the work of God. Against the teaching of his day that the righteous acts of believers are performed in cooperation with God, Luther wrote that Christians receive such righteousness entirely from outside themselves; that righteousness not only comes from Christ but actually is the righteousness of Christ, imputed to Christians (rather than infused into them) through faith. "That is why faith alone makes someone just and fulfills the law," he wrote. "Faith is that which brings the Holy Spirit through the merits of Christ." Faith, for Luther, was a gift from God. He explained his concept of "justification" in the Smalcald Articles:

The first and chief article is this: Jesus Christ, our God and Lord, died for our sins and was raised again for our justification (Romans 3:24–25). He alone is the Lamb of God who takes away the sins of the world (John 1:29), and God has laid on Him the iniquity of us all (Isaiah 53:6). All have sinned and are justified freely, without their own works and merits, by His grace, through the redemption that is in Christ Jesus, in His blood (Romans 3:23–25). This is necessary to believe. This cannot be otherwise acquired or grasped by any work, law or merit. Therefore, it is clear and certain that this faith alone justifies us ... Nothing of this article can be yielded or surrendered, even though heaven and earth and everything else falls (Mark 13:31).

=== Response of the papacy ===
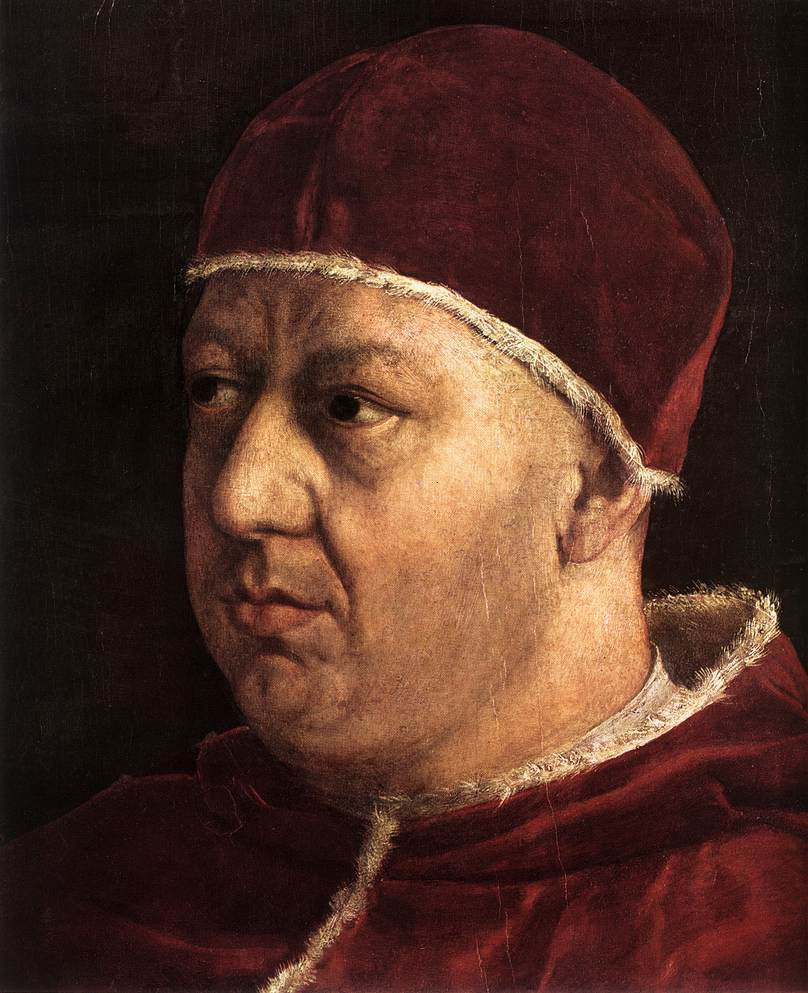
Pope Leo X by Raphael

==== Widening breach ====
Luther's writings circulated widely, reaching France, England, and Italy as early as 1519, and students thronged to Wittenberg to hear him speak. He published a short commentary on Galatians and his Work on the Psalms. At the same time, he received deputations from Italy and from the Utraquists of Bohemia; Ulrich von Hutten and Franz von Sickingen offered to place Luther under their protection.

This early portion of Luther's career was one of his most creative and productive. Three of his best known works were published in 1520: To the Christian Nobility of the German Nation, On the Babylonian Captivity of the Church, and On the Freedom of a Christian.

Finally on 30 May 1518, when the Pope demanded an explanation, Luther wrote a summary and explanation of his theses to the Pope. While the Pope may have conceded some of the points, he did not like the challenge to his authority so he summoned Luther to Rome to answer these. At that point Frederick the Wise, the Saxon Elector, intervened. He did not want one of his subjects to be sent to Rome to be judged by the Catholic clergy so he prevailed on the Holy Roman Emperor Charles V, who needed Frederick's support, to arrange a compromise.

An arrangement was effected, however, whereby that summons was cancelled, and Luther went to Augsburg in October 1518 to meet the papal legate, Cardinal Thomas Cajetan. The argument was long but nothing was resolved. The Leipzig Debate took place in June and July 1519 at Pleissenburg Castle in Leipzig, Germany. Its purpose was to discuss Martin Luther's teachings, and was initiated and conducted in the presence of George, Duke of Saxony, an opponent of Luther.

==== Excommunication ====
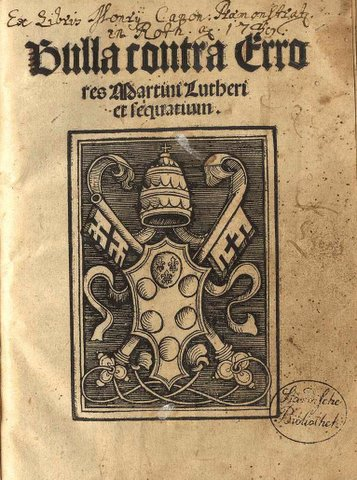
First edition of Exsurge Domine

On 15 June 1520, the Pope warned Luther with the papal bull (edict) Exsurge Domine that he risked excommunication unless he recanted 41 sentences drawn from his writings, including the Ninety-five Theses, within 60 days.

That autumn, Johann Eck proclaimed the bull in Meissen and other towns. Karl von Miltitz, a papal nuncio, attempted to broker a solution, but Luther, who had sent the Pope a copy of On the Freedom of a Christian in October, publicly set fire to the bull and decretals at Wittenberg on 10 December 1520, an act he defended in Why the Pope and his Recent Book are Burned and Assertions Concerning All Articles.

As a consequence, Luther was excommunicated by Leo X on 3 January 1521, in the bull Decet Romanum Pontificem.

== Exile ==
=== Diet of Worms ===
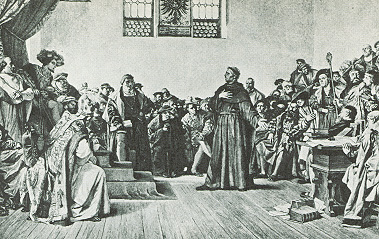
Luther Before the Diet of Worms. Photogravure based on the painting by Anton von Werner (1843–1915)

The enforcement of the ban on the 41 sentences fell to the secular authorities. On 18 April 1521, Luther appeared as ordered before the Diet of Worms. This was a general assembly of the estates of the Holy Roman Empire that took place in Worms, a town on the Rhine. It was conducted from 28 January to 25 May 1521, with Emperor Charles V presiding. Prince Frederick III, Elector of Saxony, obtained an agreement that Luther would be promised safe passage to and from the meeting.

Johann Eck, speaking on behalf of the Empire as assistant of the Archbishop of Trier, presented Luther with copies of his writings laid out on a table, and asked him if the books were his, and whether he stood by their contents. He confirmed he was the author, but requested time to think about the answer to the second question. He prayed, consulted friends, and gave his response the next day: "Unless I shall be convinced by the testimonies of the Scriptures or by clear reason ... I neither can nor will make any retraction, since it is neither safe nor honourable to act against conscience." He is also famously said to have added: "Hier stehe ich. Ich kann nicht anders. Gott helfe mir. Amen." ("Here I stand. I can do no other. God help me. Amen."). This description of the declaration may be apocryphal, as only the last four words appear in contemporaneous accounts.

Over the next five days, private conferences were held to determine Luther's fate. The Emperor presented the final draft of the Edict of Worms on May 25, 1521, declaring Luther an outlaw, banning his literature, and requiring his arrest: "We want him to be apprehended and punished as a notorious heretic". It also made it a crime for anyone in Germany to give Luther food or shelter. It permitted anyone to kill Luther without legal consequence. The Edict was a divisive move that distressed more moderate men, in particular Desiderius Erasmus.

=== Exile at Wartburg Castle ===
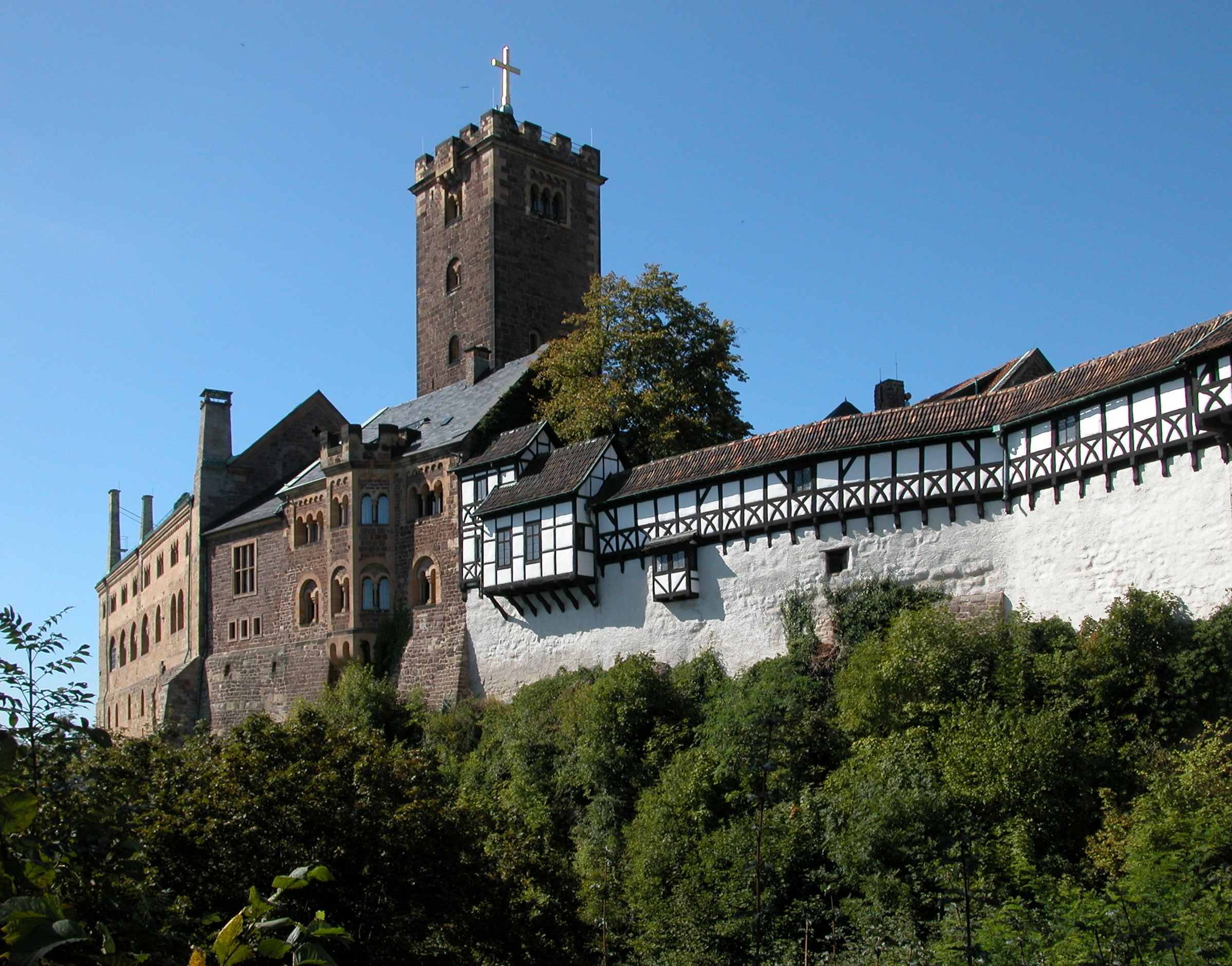
Wartburg Castle, Eisenach

Luther's disappearance during his return trip was planned. Frederick III, Elector of Saxony had him discreetly intercepted on his way home by masked horsemen and escorted to the security of the Wartburg Castle at Eisenach, where Luther grew a beard and lived incognito for nearly eleven months, pretending to be a knight called Junker Jörg.

During his stay at Wartburg (May 1521–March 1522), which he referred to as "my Patmos", Luther translated the New Testament from Greek into German, and poured out doctrinal and polemical writings, including in October a renewed attack on Archbishop Albrecht of Mainz, whom he shamed into halting the sale of indulgences in his episcopates, and a "Refutation of the argument of Latomus," in which he expounded the principle of justification to Jacobus Latomus, a philosopher from Louvain. In a letter to Melanchthon of 1 August 1521, he wrote: "[L]et your sins be strong, but let your trust in Christ be stronger, and rejoice in Christ who is the victor over sin, death, and the world. We will commit sins while we are here, for this life is not a place where justice resides."

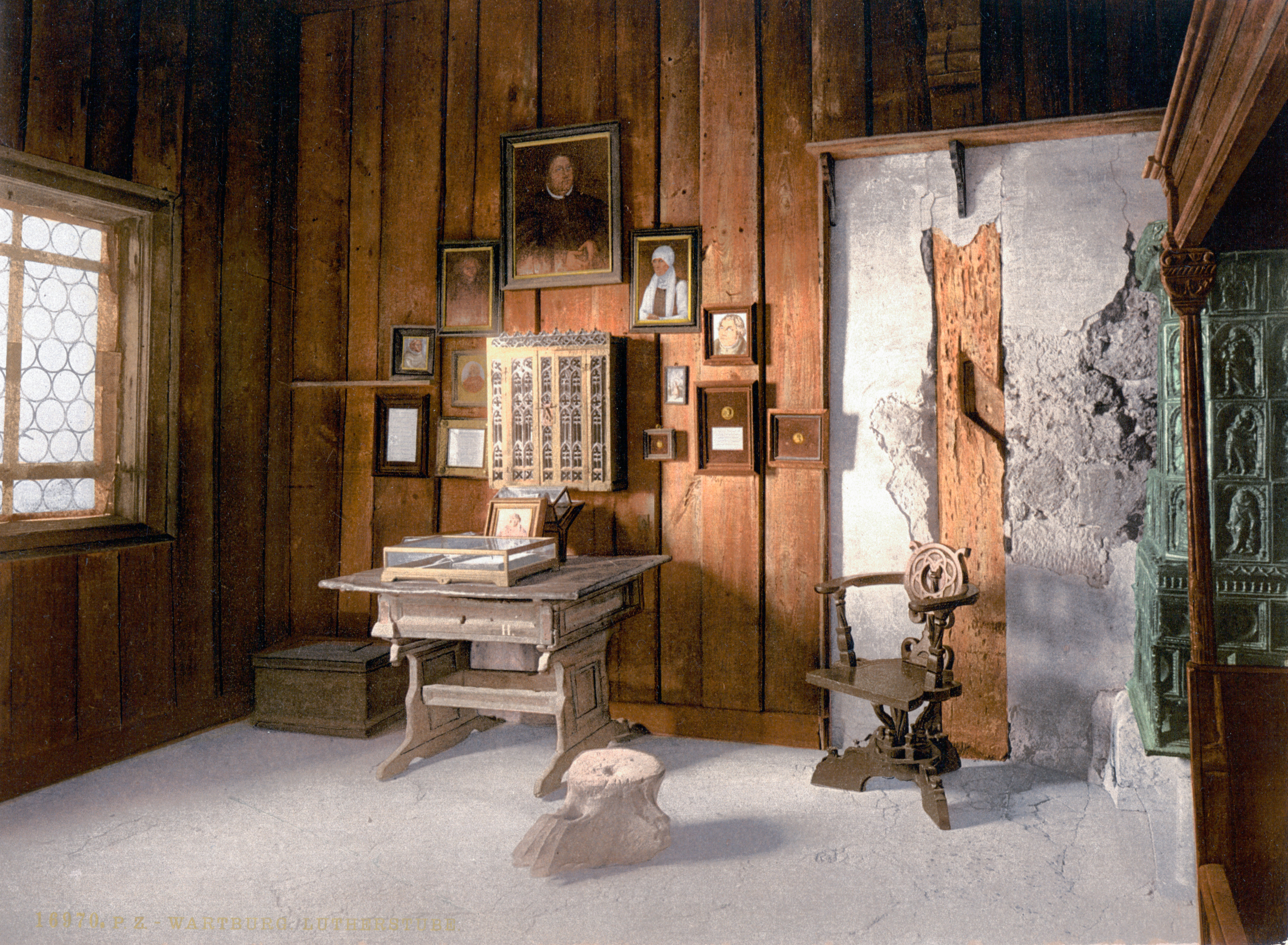
The room in Wartburg where Luther translated the New Testament into German. There is an original first edition of the translation under the case on the desk.

In On the Abrogation of the Private Mass, in the summer of 1521, Luther widened his target from individual pieties like indulgences and pilgrimages to doctrines at the heart of Church practices. His essay Concerning Confession rejected the Roman Catholic Church's requirement of confession, although he affirmed the value of private confession and absolution. In the introduction to his New Testament—published in September 1522 and selling 5,000 copies in two months—he explained that good works spring from faith; they do not produce it.

In Wittenberg, Andreas Karlstadt, later supported by the ex-Augustinian Gabriel Zwilling, enacted a divisive programme of reform which exceeded anything envisaged by Luther and provoked disturbances, including a revolt by the Augustinian friars against their prior, the smashing of statues and images in churches, and denunciations of the magistracy. After secretly visiting Wittenberg in early December 1521, Luther wrote A Sincere Admonition by Martin Luther to All Christians to Guard Against Insurrection and Rebellion; but Wittenberg became more volatile after Christmas when a band of visionary zealots, the so-called Zwickau prophets, arrived preaching the equality of man, adult baptism, Christ's imminent return, and other revolutionary doctrines. Luther decided it was time to act.

== Return to Wittenberg ==
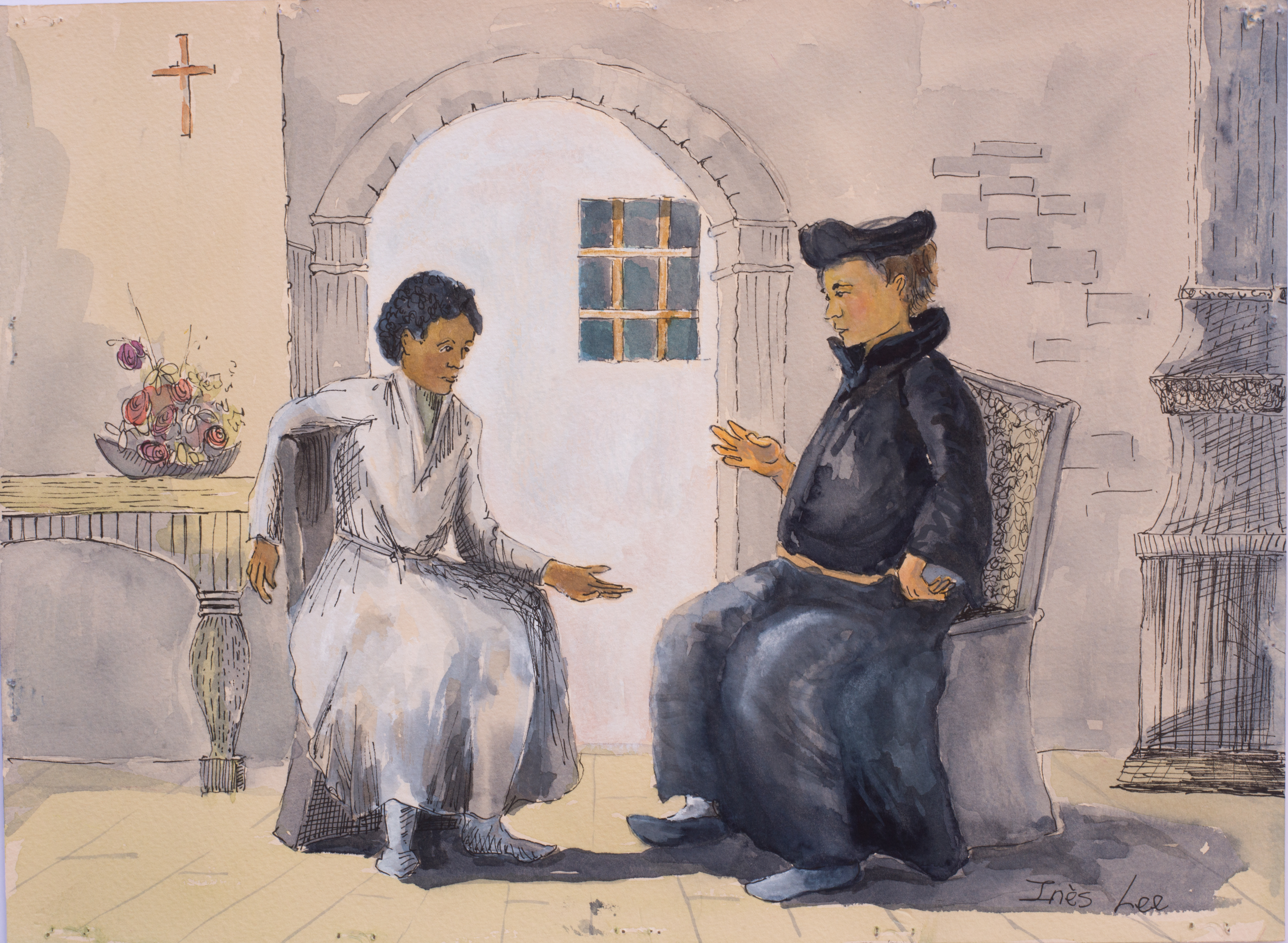
Michael the Deacon and Martin Luther convene in Wittenberg, painted by Inès Lee and commissioned by Sir John Das (2018).

Around Christmas 1521, Anabaptists from Zwickau entered Wittenberg and caused considerable civil unrest. Thoroughly opposed to their radical views and fearful of their results, Luther secretly returned to Wittenberg on March 6, 1522. "During my absence," he wrote to the Elector, "Satan has entered my sheepfold, and committed ravages which I cannot repair by writing, but only by my personal presence and living word."

For eight days in Lent, beginning on 9 March, Invocavit Sunday, and concluding the following Sunday, Luther preached eight sermons, which became known as the "Invocavit Sermons." In these sermons, he hammered home the primacy of core Christian values such as love, patience, charity, and freedom, and reminded the citizens to trust God's word rather than violence to bring about necessary change:

Do you know what the Devil thinks when he sees men use violence to propagate the gospel? He sits with folded arms behind the fire of hell, and says with malignant looks and frightful grin: "Ah, how wise these madmen are to play my game! Let them go on; I shall reap the benefit. I delight in it." But when he sees the Word running and contending alone on the battle-field, then he shudders and shakes for fear.

In 1534, Michael the Deacon of the Ethiopian Orthodox Church travelled to Wittenberg to meet with Martin Luther, both of whom agreed that the Lutheran Mass and that used by the Ethiopian Orthodox Church were in agreement with one another. In their discussion, Michael the Deacon also affirmed Luther's Articles of the Christian Faith as a "good creed". Martin Luther saw that the Ethiopian Orthodox Church practiced elements of faith including "communion in both kind, vernacular Scriptures, and married clergy" and these practices became customary in the Lutheran Churches. For Lutherans, "the Ethiopian Church conferred legitimacy on Luther’s emerging Protestant vision of a church outside the authority of the Roman Catholic papacy" as it was "an ancient church with direct ties to the apostles".

== Political and religious conflict ==
What had started as a strictly theological and academic debate had now turned into something of a social and political conflict as well, pitting Luther, his German allies and Northern European supporters against Charles V, France, the Italian Pope, their territories and other allies. The conflict would erupt into a religious war after Luther's death, fueled by the political climate of the Holy Roman Empire and strong personalities on both sides.

After the Diets of Nuremberg failed to accomplish the goal of arresting Luther, in 1526, at the First Diet of Speyer it was decided that until a General Council could meet and settle the theological issues raised by Martin Luther, the Edict of Worms would not be enforced and each Prince could decide if Lutheran teachings and worship would be allowed in his territories. In 1529, at the Second Diet of Speyer, the decision the previous Diet of Speyer was reversed—despite the strong protests of the Lutheran princes, free cities and some Zwinglian territories. These states quickly became known as Protestants. At first, this term Protestant was used politically for the states that resisted the Edict of Worms. Over time, however, this term came to be used for the religious movements that opposed the Roman Catholic tradition in the 16th century.

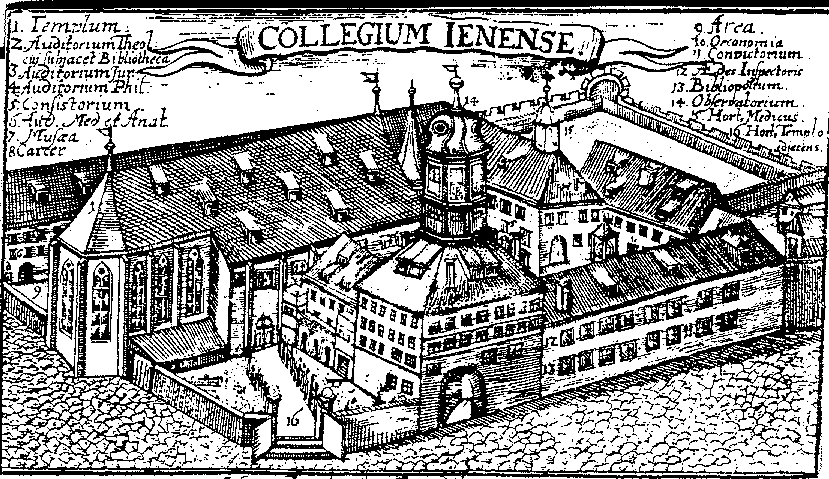
University of Jena around 1600. Jena was the center of Gnesio-Lutheran activity during the controversies leading up to the Formula of Concord.

Lutheranism would become known as a separate movement after the 1530 Diet of Augsburg, which was convened by Charles V to try to stop the growing Protestant movement. At the Diet, Philipp Melanchthon presented a written summary of Lutheran beliefs called the Augsburg Confession. Several of the German princes (and later, kings and princes of other countries) signed the document to define "Lutheran" territories. The Roman Catholic response to it was Confutatio Augustana, also at the 1530 Diet of Augsburg. In response to the Confutatio, Philipp Melanchthon prepared the Prima delineatio. Although this was rejected by the Emperor, Melanchthon improved it as a private document until it was signed at a meeting of the Schmalkaldic League as the 1537 Apology of the Augsburg Confession, but the Catholic side did not respond to it until the 1545–63 Council of Trent.

In turn several Lutheran states led by Elector John Frederick I of Saxony and Landgrave Philip I of Hesse met at the town of Schmalkalden, where they established the Schmalkaldic League in 1531. At first, the Nuremberg Religious Peace of 1532 granted religious liberty to members of the Schmalkaldic League. During this time, Martin Luther used his political influence to prevent war, but recognized the right of rulers to defend their lands in the event of an invasion (see Luther's concept of the Beerwolf ruler).

Martin Luther and the Reformation also brought a period of radical change to church architecture and design. According to the ideals of the Protestant reformation, the spoken word, the sermon, should be central act in the church service. This implied that the pulpit became the focal point of the church interior and that churches should be designed to allow all to hear and see the minister. The focus was on the preaching of the Word, rather than a sacerdotal emphasis. Holy Communion tables became wood to emphasize that Christ's sacrifice was made once for all and were made more immediate to the congregation to emphasize man's direct access to God through Christ. Therefore, catholic churches were redecorated when they became reformed: Paintings and statues of saints were removed and sometimes the altar table was placed in front of the pulpit, as at Strasbourg Cathedral in 1524. The pews were turned towards the pulpit. The first newly built Protestant church was the court chapel of Neuburg Castle in 1543, followed by the court chapel of Hartenfels Castle in Torgau, consecrated by Martin Luther on 5 October 1544.

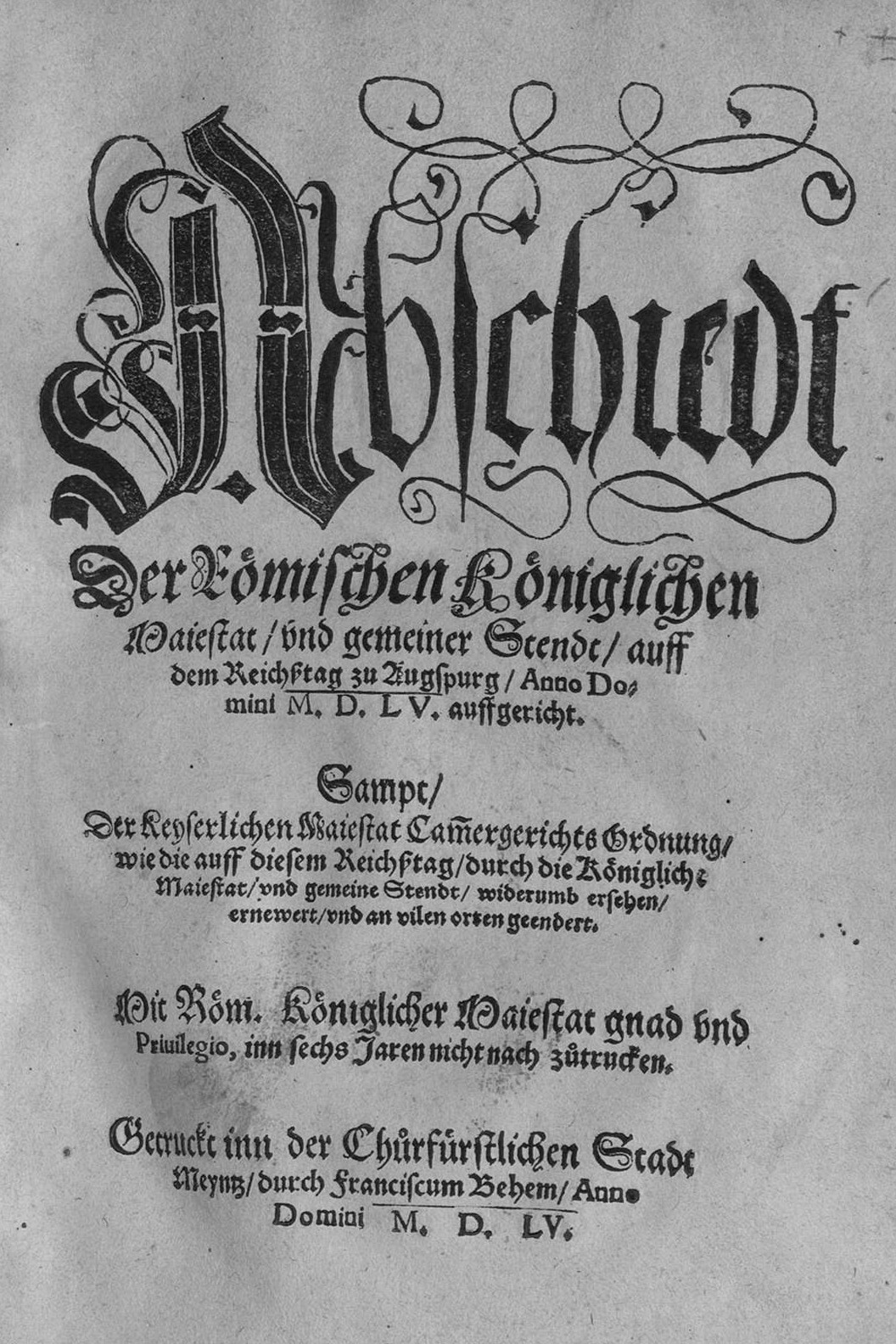
Front page of the Peace of Augsburg

Luther died in 1546. In 1547, the Schmalkaldic War started out as a battle between two Lutheran rulers, but soon, Holy Roman Imperial forces joined the battle and conquered the members of the Schmalkaldic League, oppressing and exiling many Lutherans as they enforced the terms of the Augsburg Interim until religious freedom was secured for Lutherans through the Peace of Passau of 1552 and the Peace of Augsburg of 1555.

Religious disputes between the Crypto-Calvinists, Philippists, Sacramentarians, Ubiquitarians, and the Gnesio-Lutherans raged within Lutheranism during a series of controversies

== Concordia: doctrinal harmony ==
However, the Lutheran movement was far from defeated. In 1577, the next generation of Lutheran theologians gathered the work of the previous generation to define the doctrine of the persisting Lutheran church. This document is known as the Formula of Concord. In 1580, it was published with the Augsburg Confession, the Apology of the Augsburg Confession, the Large and Small Catechisms of Martin Luther, the Smalcald Articles and the Treatise on the Power and Primacy of the Pope. Together they were distributed in a volume entitled The Book of Concord. This doctrinal standard replaced earlier, incomplete collections of doctrine, unifying all German Lutherans with identical doctrine and beginning the period of Lutheran Orthodoxy. The Lutheran Church traditionally sees itself as the "main trunk of the historical Christian Tree" founded by Christ and the Apostles, holding that during the Reformation, the Church of Rome fell away. As such, the Augsburg Confession teaches that "the faith as confessed by Luther and his followers is nothing new, but the true catholic faith, and that their churches represent the true catholic or universal church". When the Lutherans presented the Augsburg Confession to Charles V, Holy Roman Emperor, they explained "that each article of faith and practice was true first of all to Holy Scripture, and then also to the teaching of the church fathers and the councils."

=== Early Orthodoxy: 1580–1600 ===
The Book of Concord gave inner unity to Lutheranism, which had many controversies, mostly between Gnesio-Lutherans and Philippists, in Roman Catholic outward pressure and in alleged "crypto-Calvinistic" influence. Lutheran theology became more stable in its theoretical definitions.

=== High Orthodoxy: 1600–1685 ===
Lutheran scholasticism developed gradually, especially for the purpose of arguing with the Jesuits, and it was finally established by Johann Gerhard. Abraham Calovius represents the climax of the scholastic paradigm in orthodox Lutheranism. Other orthodox Lutheran theologians were e.g. Martin Chemnitz, Aegidius Hunnius, Leonhard Hutter, Nicolaus Hunnius, Jesper Rasmussen Brochmand, Salomo Glassius, Johann Hülsemann, Johann Conrad Dannhauer, Johannes Andreas Quenstedt, Johann Friedrich König and Johann Wilhelm Baier.

The theological heritage of Philip Melanchthon rose up again in the Helmstedt School and especially in the theology of Georgius Calixtus, which caused the Syncretistic Controversy. Another theological issue was the Crypto-Kenotic Controversy.

=== Late Orthodoxy (1685–1730) ===
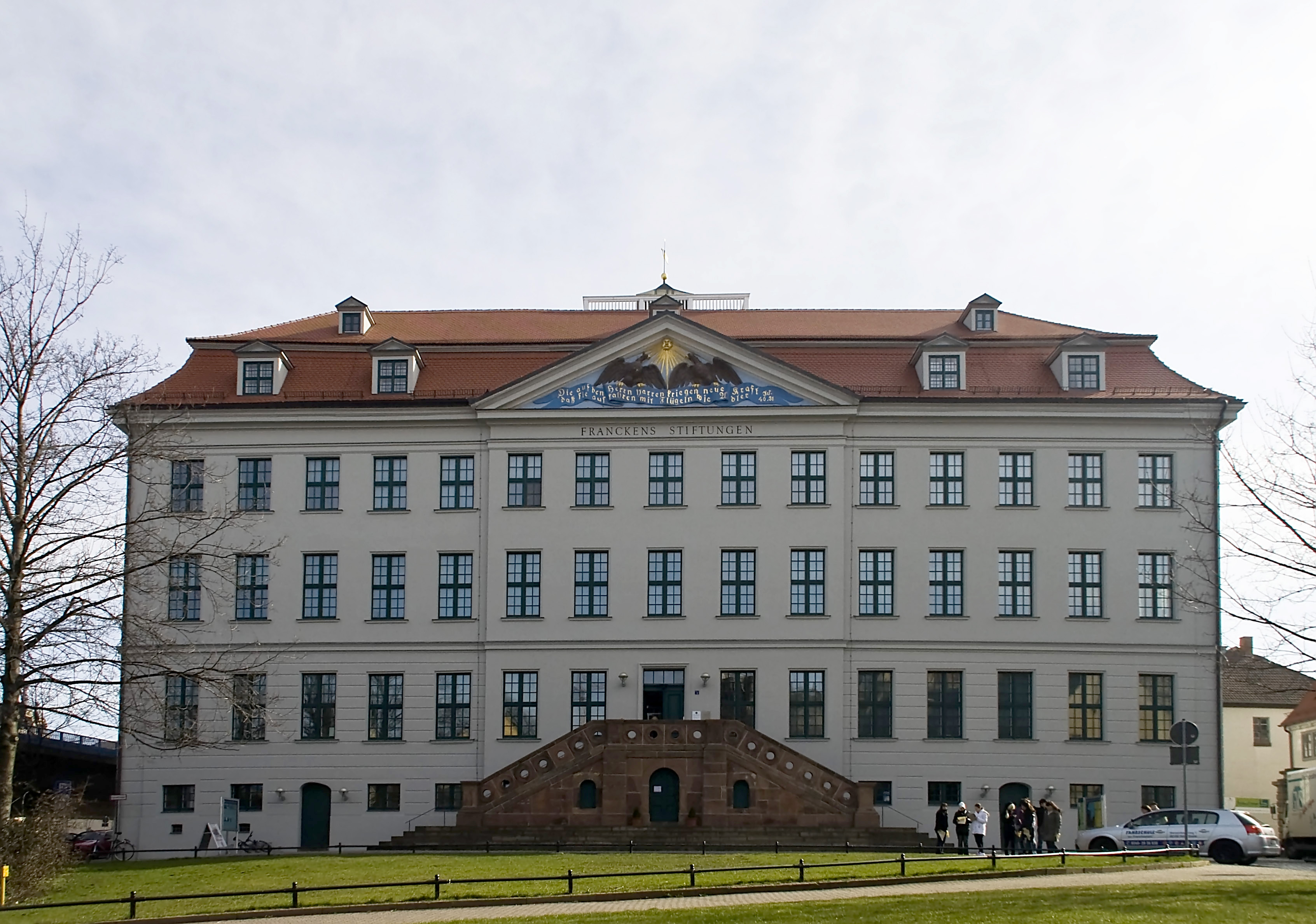
Historic Pietist orphanage in Halle, Germany, a center of Pietism

Generally, the 17th century was a more difficult time than the earlier period of Reformation, due in part to the Thirty Years' War. Finland suffered a severe famine in 1696–1697 as part of what is now called the Little Ice Age, and almost one third of the population died. This struggle to survive can often be seen in hymns and devotional writings.

Late Orthodoxy was torn by influences from rationalism, philosophy based on reason, and Pietism, a revival movement in Lutheranism that sought to emphasise the importance of personal devotion, morality, emotions, and the study of Scripture. After a century of vitality, the Pietist theologians Philipp Jakob Spener and August Hermann Francke warned that Lutheran orthodoxy degenerated life-changing scriptural truth into meaningless intellectualism and Formalism. Pietism increased at the expense of orthodoxy, but their emphasis on personal morality and sanctification came at the expense of teaching the doctrine of justification. The Pietisitic focus on stirring up devout emotions was susceptible to the arguments of rationalist philosophy.

The last prominent orthodox Lutheran theologian before the Enlightenment and Neology was David Hollatz. A later orthodox theologian, Valentin Ernst Löscher, took part in a controversy against Pietism. Mediaeval mystical tradition continued in the works of Martin Moller, Johann Arndt and Joachim Lütkemann. Pietism became a rival of orthodoxy but adopted some orthodox devotional literature, such as those of Arndt, Christian Scriver and Stephan Prätorius, which have often been later mixed with Pietistic literature.

== Rationalism and revivals ==
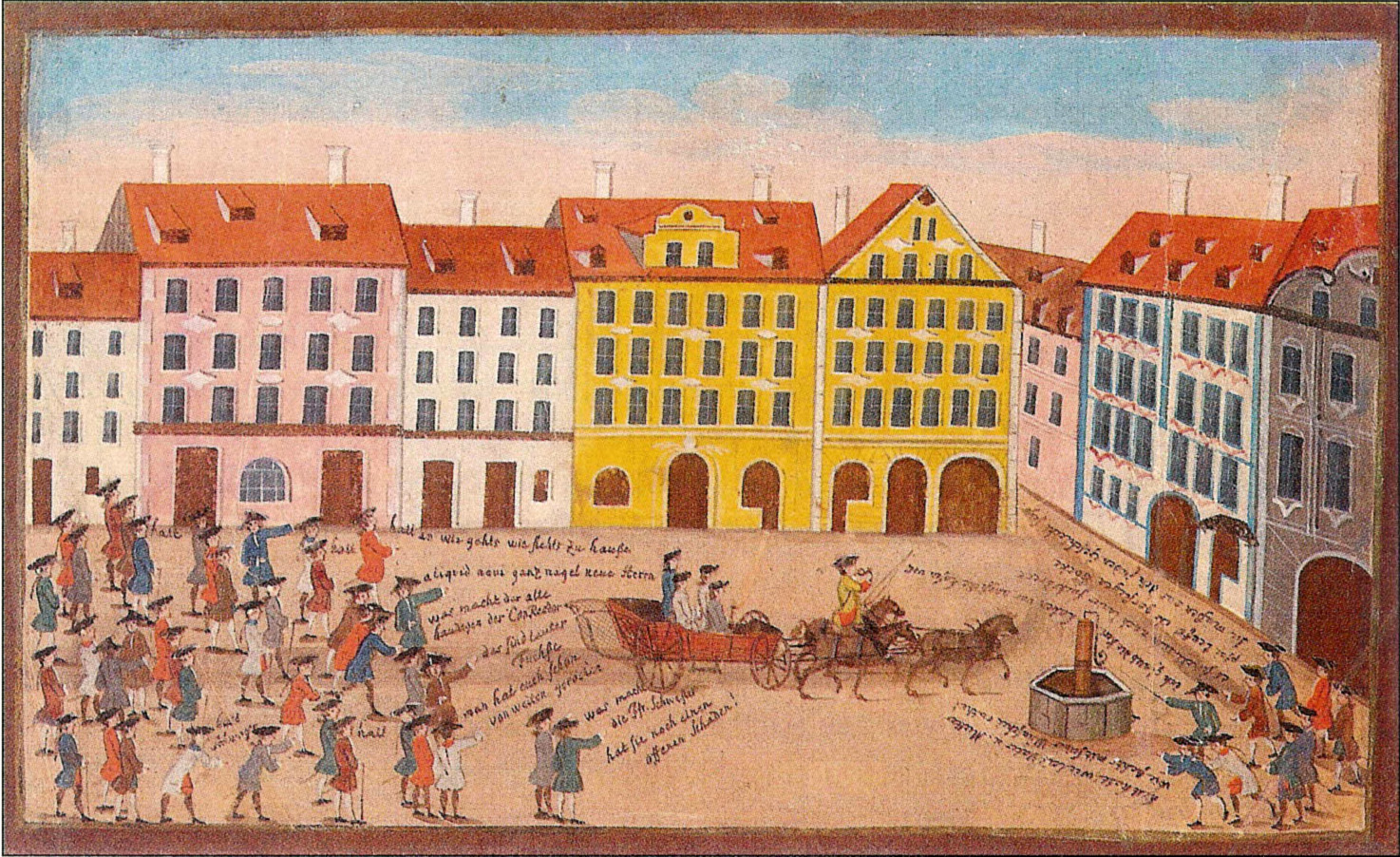
University of Jena at 1770, no longer a stronghold of orthodox Lutheranism. During the 1700s, Germany turned to rationalism.

=== Rationalism ===
Into this complicated religious scene, rationalist philosophers from France and England had an enormous impact, along with the German rationalists Christian Wolff, Gottfried Leibniz and Immanuel Kant. Instead of faith in God and trust in the promises of the Bible and Christian doctrine, people were taught to trust their own reason and senses. At the most, rationalism left behind a belief in a vague supernaturalism. Church-going plummeted, and with it traditionally Lutheran values.

Religious fervor was found almost solely in small Pietist gatherings. However, some of the laity preserved Lutheran orthodoxy from both Pietism and rationalism through reusing old catechisms, hymnbooks, postils, and devotional writings, including those written by Johann Gerhard, Heinrich Müller, and Christian Scriver. Aside from that, however, Lutheranism vanished in the wake of rationalist philosophy.

=== Revivals ===
==== The Awakening ====
Napoleon's invasion of Germany promoted rationalism and angered German Lutherans, stirring up a desire among the people to preserve Luther's theology from the rationalist threat. This Erweckung, or Awakening, argued that reason was insufficient and pointed out the importance of emotional religious experience. Small groups sprang up, often in universities, which devoted themselves to Bible study, reading devotional writings, and revival meetings. Members of this movement eventually took to restoring the traditional liturgy and doctrine of the Lutheran church in the Neo-Lutheran movement. A layman, Luther scholar Johann Georg Hamann, became famous for countering rationalism and advancing the Awakening.

This Awakening also swept through Scandinavia, influenced by both German Neo-Lutheranism and Pietism. Danish pastor and philosopher N. F. S. Grundtvig reshaped church life throughout Denmark through a reform movement beginning in 1830. He also wrote about 1,500 hymns, including God's Word Is Our Great Heritage. In Norway, Hans Nielsen Hauge, a lay street preacher, emphasized spiritual discipline and sparked the Haugean movement. In Sweden, Lars Levi Læstadius began the Laestadian movement that emphasized moral reform. In Finland, a farmer, Paavo Ruotsalainen, started a reform movement when he took to preaching about repentance and prayer.

==== Old Lutherans ====
In 1817, Frederick William III of Prussia ordered the Lutheran and Reformed churches in his territory to unite, forming the Evangelical Church of the Prussian Union. The unification of the two branches of German Protestantism sparked the Schism of the Old Lutherans. Many Lutherans, called "Old Lutherans", despite imprisonment and military force, chose to leave the established churches and form independent church bodies, or "free churches" while others left for the United States and Australia. A similar legislated merger in Silesia prompted thousands to join the Old Lutheran movement. The dispute over ecumenism overshadowed other controversies within German Lutheranism.

==== Neo-Lutherans ====
Despite political meddling in church life, local leaders sought to restore and renew Christianity. High school teacher August Friedrich Christian Vilmar turned from rationalism to faith, and in doing so, realized the importance of the unaltered Augsburg Confession and the other Lutheran Confessions of faith. An advocate of the Neo-Lutheran movement (which was allied with the Old Lutherans against rationalism), he worked to renew the church through the use of the Lutheran Confessions. Neo-Lutheran Johann Konrad Wilhelm Löhe and Old Lutheran free church leader Friedrich August Brünn both sent young men overseas to serve as Pastors to German Americans, while the Inner Mission focused on renewing the situation home. Johann Gottfried Herder, superintendent at Weimar and part of the Inner Mission movement, joined with the Romantic movement with his quest to preserve human emotion and experience from rationalism.

==== Results ====
The Neo-Lutheran movement managed to slow secularism and counter atheistic Marxist socialism, but it did not fully succeed in Europe. It partly succeeded in continuing the Pietist movement's drive to right social wrongs and focus on individual conversion. The Neo-Lutheran call to renewal failed to achieve widespread popular acceptance because it was rooted in a lofty, idealistic Romanticism that did not connect with an increasingly industrialized and secularized Europe. At best, the work of local leaders resulted in specific areas with vibrant spiritual renewal, but people in Lutheran areas overall continued to become increasingly distant from church life. Beginning in 1867, confessional and liberal minded German Lutherans joined to form the Common Evangelical Lutheran Conference against the ever looming prospect of a legally binding union with the Reformed. However, they failed to reach a consensus among themselves on how much agreement in doctrine is necessary for church union. Eventually, the fascist German Christians movement forced the final national merger of Lutherans and Reformed into a single Reich Church, the German Protestant Church in 1933. After World War II, the German Protestant Church was re-founded with the new name Protestant Church in Germany.

== 20th century ==
Lutherans were persecuted under the state atheism of the Soviet Union, with the number of congregations dwindling from 1,828 in 1917 to just 160 in 1922. They lost their church buildings in addition to their farmland. In 1929, two Lutheran priests and thirty Sunday School teachers were arrested.

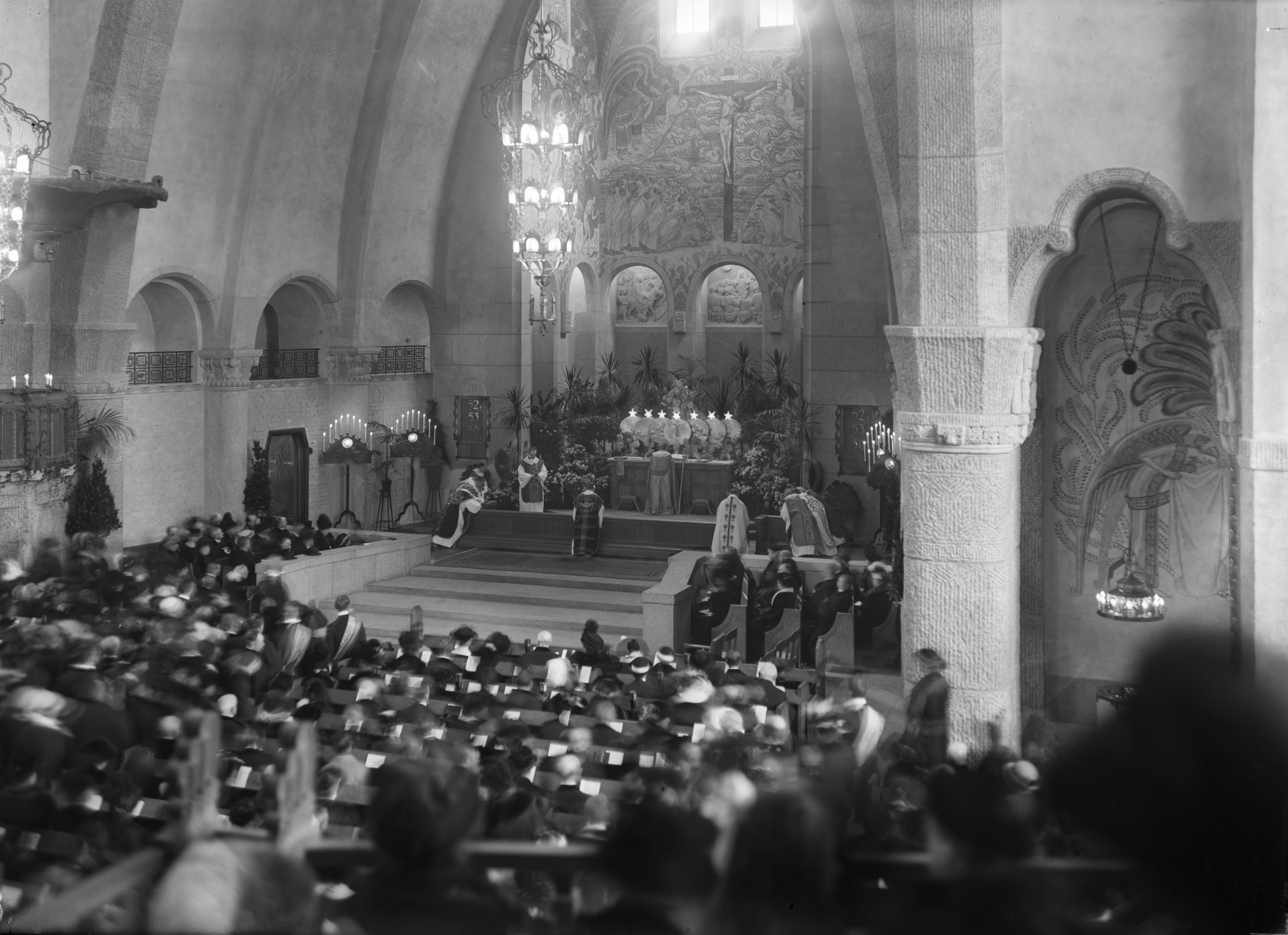
The inauguration of the newly built parish Engelbrekt Church (Evangelical-Lutheran) in central Stockholm in 1914, with Archbishop Nathan Söderblom in front of the high altar

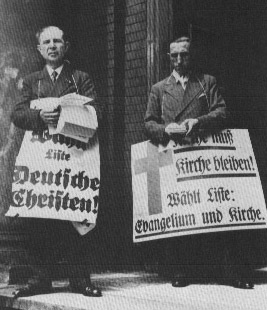
Members of the Evangelical-Lutheran Confessing Church sought to counter Nazi propaganda held by Stormtroopers at the Church Council elections on July 23, 1933, at St. Mary's Church, Berlin.

== See also ==
- High Church Lutheranism
- The Reformation and its influence on church architecture
