= Lutheran orthodoxy =

Era in the history of Lutheranism (1580–1730)

Lutheran orthodoxy was an era in the history of Lutheranism, which began in 1580 from the writing of the Book of Concord and ended at the Age of Enlightenment. Lutheran orthodoxy was paralleled by similar eras in Calvinism and tridentine Roman Catholicism after the Counter-Reformation.

Lutheran scholasticism was a theological method that gradually developed during the era of Lutheran orthodoxy. Theologians used the neo-Aristotelian form of presentation, already popular in academia, in their writings and lectures. They defined the Lutheran faith and defended it against the polemics of opposing parties.

== History ==
Martin Luther died in 1546, and Philipp Melanchthon in 1560. After the death of Luther came the period of the Schmalkaldic War and disputes among Crypto-Calvinists, Philippists, Sacramentarians, Ubiquitarians, and Gnesio-Lutherans.

=== Early orthodoxy: 1580–1600 ===
The Book of Concord gave inner unity to Lutheranism, which had many controversies, mostly between Gnesio-Lutherans and Philippists, in Roman Catholic outward pressure and in alleged "crypto-Calvinistic" influence. Lutheran theology became more stable in its theoretical definitions.

=== High orthodoxy: 1600–1685 ===
Part of the series on
Modern scholasticism
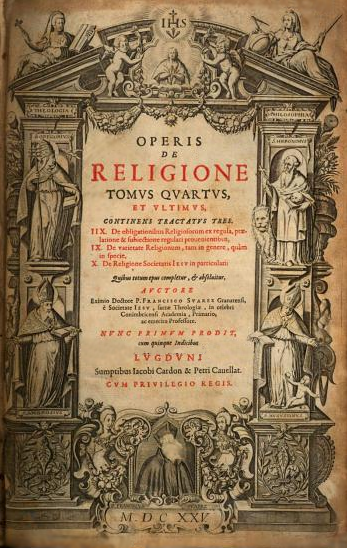
Title page of the Operis de religione (1625) from Francisco Suárez
Background

Protestant Reformation
Counter-Reformation
Aristotelianism
Scholasticism
Patristics

Modern scholastics

Second scholasticism of the School of Salamanca
Lutheran scholasticism during Lutheran orthodoxy
Ramism among the Reformed orthodoxy
Metaphysical poets in the Church of England

Reactions within Christianity

Jesuits against Jansenism
Labadists against the Jesuits
Pietism against orthodox Lutherans
Nadere Reformatie within Dutch Calvinism
Richard Hooker against the Ramists

Reactions within philosophy

Neologists against Lutherans
Spinozists against Dutch Calvinists
Deists against Anglicanism
John Locke against Bishop Stillingfleet

Lutheran scholasticism developed gradually, especially for the purpose of disputation with the Jesuits, and it was finally established by Johann Gerhard (1582–1637). Abraham Calovius (1612–1686) represents the climax of the scholastic paradigm in orthodox Lutheranism. Other orthodox Lutheran theologians include (for example) Martin Chemnitz, Aegidius Hunnius, Leonhard Hutter (1563–1616), Nicolaus Hunnius, Jesper Rasmussen Brochmand, Salomo Glassius, Johann Hülsemann, Johann Conrad Dannhauer, Valerius Herberger, Johannes Andreas Quenstedt, Johann Friedrich König and Johann Wilhelm Baier.

The theological heritage of Philip Melanchthon arose again in the Helmstedt School and especially in the theology of Georgius Calixtus (1586–1656), which caused the syncretistic controversy of 1640–1686. Another theological issue was the Crypto-Kenotic Controversy of 1619–1627.

=== Late orthodoxy: 1685–1730 ===
Late orthodoxy was torn by influences from rationalism and pietism. Orthodoxy produced numerous postils, which were important devotional readings. Along with hymns, they conserved orthodox Lutheran spirituality during this period of heavy influence from pietism and neology. Johann Gerhard, Heinrich Müller and Christian Scriver wrote other kinds of devotional literature. The last prominent orthodox Lutheran theologian before the Enlightenment and Neology was David Hollatz. A later orthodox theologian, Valentin Ernst Löscher, took part in a controversy against Pietism. Mediaeval mystical tradition continued in the works of Martin Moller, Johann Arndt and Joachim Lütkemann. Pietism became a rival of orthodoxy but adopted some orthodox devotional literature, such as those of Arndt, Scriver and Stephan Prätorius, which have often been later mixed with pietistic literature.

David Hollatz combined mystic and scholastic elements.

=== Content ===
Scholastic dogmaticians followed the historical order of God's saving acts. First Creation was taught, then the Fall, followed by Redemption, and finished by the Last Things. This order, as an independent part of the Lutheran tradition, was not derived from any philosophical method. It was followed not only by those using the loci method, but also those using the analytical. The usual order of the loci:

1. Holy Scriptures
2. Trinity (including Christology and the doctrine of the Holy Spirit)
3. Creation
4. Providence
5. Predestination
6. Image of God
7. Fall of Man
8. Sin
9. Free Will
10. Law
11. Gospel
12. Repentance
13. Faith and Justification
14. Good Works
15. Sacraments
16. Church
17. Three Estates
18. Last Things

== Lutheran scholasticism ==
=== Background ===
High Scholasticism in Western Christianity aimed at an exhaustive treatment of theology, supplementing revelation by the deductions of reason. Aristotle furnished the rules according to which it proceeded, and after a while he became the authority for both the source and process of theology.

=== Initial rejection ===
Lutheranism began as a vigorous protest against scholasticism, starting with Martin Luther. Around the time he became a monk, Luther sought assurances about life, and was drawn to theology and philosophy, expressing particular interest in Aristotle and the scholastics William of Ockham and Gabriel Biel. He was deeply influenced by two tutors, Bartholomaeus Arnoldi von Usingen and Jodocus Trutfetter, who taught him to be suspicious of even the greatest thinkers, and to test everything himself by experience. Philosophy proved to be unsatisfying, offering assurance about the use of reason, but none about the importance, for Luther, of loving God. Reason could not lead men to God, he felt, and he developed a love-hate relationship with Aristotle over the latter's emphasis on reason. For Luther, reason could be used to question men and institutions, but not God. Human beings could learn about God only through divine revelation, he believed, and Scripture therefore became increasingly important to him.

In particular, Luther wrote theses 43 and 44 for his student Franz Günther to publicly defend in 1517 as part of earning his Baccalaureus Biblicus degree:

It is not merely incorrect to say that without Aristotle no man can become a theologian; on the contrary, we must say: he is no theologian who does not become one without Aristotle

Martin Luther held that it was "not at all in conformity with the New Testament to write books about Christian doctrine." He noted that before the Apostles wrote books, they "previously preached to and converted the people with the physical voice, which was also their real apostolic and New Testament work." To Luther, it was necessary to write books to counter all the false teachers and errors of the present day, but writing books on Christian teaching came at a price. "But since it became necessary to write books, there is already a great loss, and there is uncertainty as to what is meant." Martin Luther taught preaching and lectured upon the books of the Bible in an exegetical manner. To Luther, St. Paul was the greatest of all systematic theologians, and his Epistle to the Romans was the greatest dogmatics textbook of all time.

Analysis of Luther's works, however, reveals a reliance on scholastic distinctions and modes of argument even after he had dismissed scholasticism entirely. Luther seems to be comfortable with the use of such theological methods so long as the content of theology is normed by scripture, though his direct statements regarding scholastic method are unequivocally negative.

=== Loci method ===
==== Beginning of the loci method ====
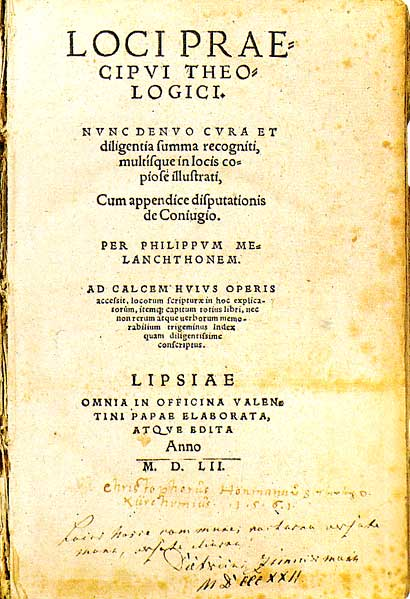
Loci Communes, 1521 edition

In contrast, Philipp Melanchthon scarcely began to lecture on Romans before he decided to formulate and arrange the definitions of the common theological terms of the epistle in his Loci Communes.

==== Flourishing of the loci method ====
Martin Chemnitz, Mathias Haffenreffer, and Leonhard Hutter simply expanded upon Melanchthon's Loci Communes. With Chemnitz, however, a biblical method prevailed. At Melanchthon's suggestion he undertook a course of self-study. He began by carefully working through the Bible in the original languages while also answering questions that had previously puzzled him. When he felt ready to move on, he turned his attention to reading through the early theologians of the church slowly and carefully. Then he turned to current theological concerns and once again read painstakingly while making copious notes. His tendency was to constantly support his arguments with what is now known as biblical theology. He understood biblical revelation to be progressive—building from the earlier books to the later ones—and examined his supporting texts in their literary contexts and historical settings.

=== Analytic method ===
Properly speaking, Lutheran scholasticism began in the 17th century, when the theological faculty of Wittenberg took up the scholastic method to fend off attacks by Jesuit theologians of the Second Scholastic Period of Roman Catholicism.

==== Origin of the analytic method ====
The philosophical school of neo-Aristotelianism began among Roman Catholics, for example, the universities Padua and Coimbra. However, it spread to Germany by the late 16th century, resulting in a distinctly Protestant system of metaphysics associated with humanism. This scholastic system of metaphysics held that abstract concepts could explain the world in clear, distinct terms. This influenced the character of the scientific method.

Jacopo Zabarella, a natural philosopher from Padua, taught that one could begin with a goal in mind and then explain ways to reach the goal. Although this was a scientific concept that Lutherans did not feel theology had to follow, by the beginning of the 17th century, Lutheran theologian Balthasar Mentzer attempted to explain theology in the same way. Beginning with God as the goal, he explained the doctrine of man, the nature of theology, and the way man can attain eternal happiness with God. This form of presentation, called the analytic method, replaced the loci method used by Melancthon in his Loci Communes. This method made the presentation of theology more uniform, as each theologian could present Christian teaching as the message of salvation and the way to attain this salvation.

==== Flourishing of the analytic and synthetic methods ====
After the time of Johann Gerhard, Lutherans lost their attitude that philosophy was antagonistic to theology. Instead, Lutheran dogmaticians used syllogistic arguments and the philosophical terms common in the neo-Aristotelianism of the time to make fine distinctions and enhance the precision of their theological method. Scholastic Lutheran theologians engaged in a twofold task. First, they collected texts, arranged them, supported them with arguments, and gave rebuttals based on the theologians before them. Second, they completed their process by going back to the pre-Reformation scholastics in order to gather additional material which they assumed the Reformation also accepted. Even though the Lutheran scholastic theologians added their own criticism to the pre-Reformation scholastics, they still had an important influence. Mainly, this practice served to separate their theology from direct interaction with Scripture. However, their theology was still built on Scripture as an authority that needed no external validation. Their scholastic method was intended to serve the purpose of their theology. Some dogmaticians preferred to use the synthetic method, while others used the analytic method, but all of them allowed Scripture to determine the form and content of their statements.

==== Abuse of the methods ====
Some Lutheran scholastic theologians, for example, Johann Gerhard, used exegetical theology along with Lutheran scholasticism. However, in Calov, even his exegesis is dominated by his use of the analytic method With Johann Friedrich König and his student Johannes Andreas Quenstedt, scholastic Lutheran theology reached its zenith. However the 20th century Lutheran scholar Robert Preus was of the opinion that König went overboard with the scholastic method by overloading his small book, Theologia Positiva Acroamatica with Aristotelian distinctions. He noted that the scholastic method was inherently loaded with pitfalls. In particular, dogmaticians sometimes established cause and effect relationships without suitable links. When dogmaticians forced mysteries of the faith to fit into strict cause and effect relationships, they created "serious inconsistencies". In addition, sometimes they drew unneeded or baseless conclusions from the writings of their opponents, which not only was unproductive, but also harmed their own cause more than that of their rivals. Later orthodox dogmaticians tended to have an enormous number of artificial distinctions.

==== Merits of the methods ====
On the other hand, the Lutheran scholastic method, although often tedious and complicated, managed to largely avoid vagueness and the fallacy of equivocation. As a result, their writings are understandable and prone to misrepresentation only by those entirely opposed to their theology. The use of scholastic philosophy also made Lutheran orthodoxy more intellectually rigorous. Theological questions could be resolved in a clean cut, even scientific, manner. The use of philosophy gave orthodox Lutheran theologians better tools to pass on their tradition than were otherwise available. It is also worth noting that it was only after neo-Aristotelian philosophical methods were ended that orthodox Lutheranism came to be criticized as austere, non-Christian formalism.

== Distinction between scholastic theology and method ==
The term “scholasticism” is used to indicate both the scholastic theology that arose during the pre-Reformation Church and the methodology associated with it. While Lutherans reject the theology of the scholastics, some accept their method. Henry Eyster Jacobs writes of the scholastic method:

The method is the application of the most rigorous appliances of logic to the formulation and analysis of theological definitions. The method per se cannot be vicious, as sound logic always must keep within its own boundaries. It became false, when logic, as a science that has only to do with the natural, and with the supernatural only so far as it has been brought, by revelation, within the sphere of natural apprehension, undertakes not only to be the test of the supernatural, but to determine all of its relations.

== Worship and spirituality ==
Congregations maintained the full Mass rituals in their normal worship as suggested by Luther. In his Hauptgottesdienst (principal service of worship), Holy Communion was celebrated on each Sunday and festival. The traditional parts of the service were retained and, sometimes, even incense was also used. Services were conducted in vernacular language, but in Germany, Latin was also present in both the Ordinary and Proper parts of the service. This helped students maintain their familiarity with the language. As late as the time of Johann Sebastian Bach, churches in Leipzig still heard Polyphonic motets in Latin, Latin Glorias, chanted Latin collects and The Creed sung in Latin by the choir.

Church music flourished and this era is considered as a "golden age" of Lutheran hymnody. Some hymnwriters include Philipp Nicolai, Johann Heermann, Johann von Rist and Benjamin Schmolck in Germany, Haquin Spegel in Sweden, Thomas Hansen Kingo in Denmark, Petter Dass in Norway, Hallgrímur Pétursson in Iceland, and Hemminki Maskulainen in Finland. The most famous orthodox Lutheran hymnwriter is Paul Gerhardt. Prominent church musicians and composers include Michael Praetorius, Melchior Vulpius, Johann Hermann Schein, Heinrich Schütz, Johann Crüger, Dieterich Buxtehude and Bach. Generally, the 17th century was a more difficult time than the earlier period of Reformation, due in part to the Thirty Years' War. Finland suffered a severe famine in 1696-1697 as part of what is now called the Little Ice Age, and almost one third of the population died. This struggle to survive can often be seen in hymns and devotional writings.

== Evaluation ==
The era of Lutheran orthodoxy is not well known, and it has been very often looked at only through the view of liberal theology and pietism and thus underestimated. The wide gap between the theology of Orthodoxy and rationalism has sometimes limited later theological neo-Lutheran and confessional Lutheran attempts to understand and restore Lutheran orthodoxy.

More recently, a number of social historians, as well as historical theologians, have brought Lutheran orthodoxy to the forefront of their research. These scholars have expanded the understanding of Lutheran orthodoxy to include topics such as preaching and catechesis, devotional literature, popular piety, religious ritual, music and hymnody, and the concerns of cultural and political historians.

The most significant theologians of Orthodoxy can be said to be Martin Chemnitz and Johann Gerhard. Lutheran orthodoxy can also be reflected in such rulers as Ernst I, Duke of Saxe-Coburg-Altenburg and Gustavus Adolphus of Sweden.

== See also ==
- Loci Theologici
- Protestant scholasticism
- Reformed orthodoxy
- Scholastic Lutheran Christology
