= Church Order (Lutheran) =

General ecclesiastical constitution of a State Church

The Church Order or Church Ordinance (German: Kirchenordnung) means the general ecclesiastical constitution of a State Church.

== History ==
The early Evangelical Church attached less importance to ecclesiastical rituals than the Catholic Church did. As early as 1526 Martin Luther observed in Deutsche Messe und Ordnung des Gottesdiensts: "In sum, this and all other forms were to be used in a manner that where they gave rise to a misuse they should be forthwith set aside, and a new form be made ready; since outward forms are intended to serve to the advancement of faith and love, and not to the detriment of faith. Where they ceased to do the above, they are already dead and void, and are of no more value; just as when a good coin is debased, sad or retired on account of its abuse, and issued anew; or when everyday shoes wax old and rub, they are no longer worn, but thrown away and new ones bought. The form is an external thing, be it ever so good, and thus it may lapse into misuse; but then it is no longer an orderly form, but a disorder; so that no external order stands and avails itself, as hitherto the papal forms are judged to have done, but all forms have their life's worth, strength, and virtues in proper use; or else they are of no value whatsoever" (Werke, Weimar ed., xix. 72 aqq.). According to Lutheran ecclesiastical teaching (Formula of Concord, II; Solida declaratio, x.; Apology, xiv.; Melanchthon's Loci, 2d redaction in CR, xxi. 555-556; the Saxon Visitationsbuch of 1528; etc.) a uniform liturgy is requisite only in so far as it is indispensable to uphold proper doctrine and the administration of the sacraments; whereas in general the rightful appointment of the external functions of church officers and their sphere in the congregations is committed to the church governing board of the state authorities. The spontaneous development of church law, and especially the regulation of divine service, the sacraments, and discipline, as Luther ideally conceived it, proved impracticable, and gave place, though not invariably so, to definition on the part of temporal sovereigns. All these regulations, especially those of governments and cities, through which the canonical church forms that had previously prevailed in the land were modified in a reformatory direction, while the newly developing church system became progressively established, are called "Church Orders". Those established in the sixteenth century are the most important.

== Format ==
A Church Order usually begins with a dogmatic part in which the agreement of the State Church with the general Lutheran confessions is set forth with more or less detail (Credenda); then it follows regulations concerning the liturgy, the appointment of church officers, organization of church government, discipline, marriage, schools, the pay of church and school officials, the administration of church property, care of the poor, etc. (Agenda). A systematic topical arrangement is by no means always adhered to. As a rule, later compilations have made use of earlier forms, and thus the Orders are grouped in families.

== See also ==
- Swedish Church Ordinance 1571
- Canon law
- Ecclesiastical Ordinances
