= Letter on certain questions concerning eschatology =

Letter on certain questions concerning eschatology is a Congregation for the Doctrine of the Faith letter published on May 17, 1979. In this letter, the congregation, describing itself as having the task "to advance and protect the doctrine of the faith," answers questions about the Catholic Church's eschatology. Specifically, the congregation wrote that it "wishes to recall what the Church teaches in the name of Christ" about what happens right after death, "between the death of the Christian and the general resurrection."

== Eschatological points ==
=== Resurrection ===
The church believes, based on the Nicene Creed, in the "resurrection of the dead". This resurrection the church understands as referring to "the whole person".

=== Soul ===
The church uses the term "soul", taken from Scripture and tradition, to designate a "spiritual element" of man, "endowed with consciousness and will", in which one's self subsists and which "survives and subsists after death." The church excludes, as loci theologici, "every way of thinking or speaking" that would render her prayers, rites, and acts "meaningless or unintelligible".

=== Second Coming ===
The church anticipates the "glorious manifestation of our Lord", which is distinct from the afterlife and which is yet to happen.

=== Assumption of Mary ===
The church teaches, in the context of "man's destiny after death", that the Assumption of Mary has a unique meaning: the "bodily glorification of the Virgin" anticipates the "glorification that is the destiny of all the other elect."

=== Heaven, Hell, and Purgatory ===
The church believes, via the New Testament and tradition, in heaven, hell, and purgatory.

Heaven will be the "happiness of the elect", who will "be with Christ", "shall see God", and will share in "God's glory" in proportion to their "charity on Earth", since "charity is the law of the Kingdom of God." In heaven, the "economy of faith will be replaced by the economy of fullness of life."

Hell will be "eternal punishment for the sinner", which will consist in being "deprived of the sight of God" and which will have "a repercussion on the whole being of the sinner."

Purgatory will be possible, as it is "purification for the elect before they see God," which will be "altogether different from the punishment of the damned."

=== Limits of divine revelation and human intellect ===
The church believes "[n]either Scripture nor theology provides sufficient light for a proper picture of life after death." The images of life after death found in Scripture must not be "over-attenuated", since they have specific meanings. Also, "arbitrary imaginative representations" must not be used for life after death, since the imagination is incapable of conceiving of heaven.
