= Nicolaus Hunnius =

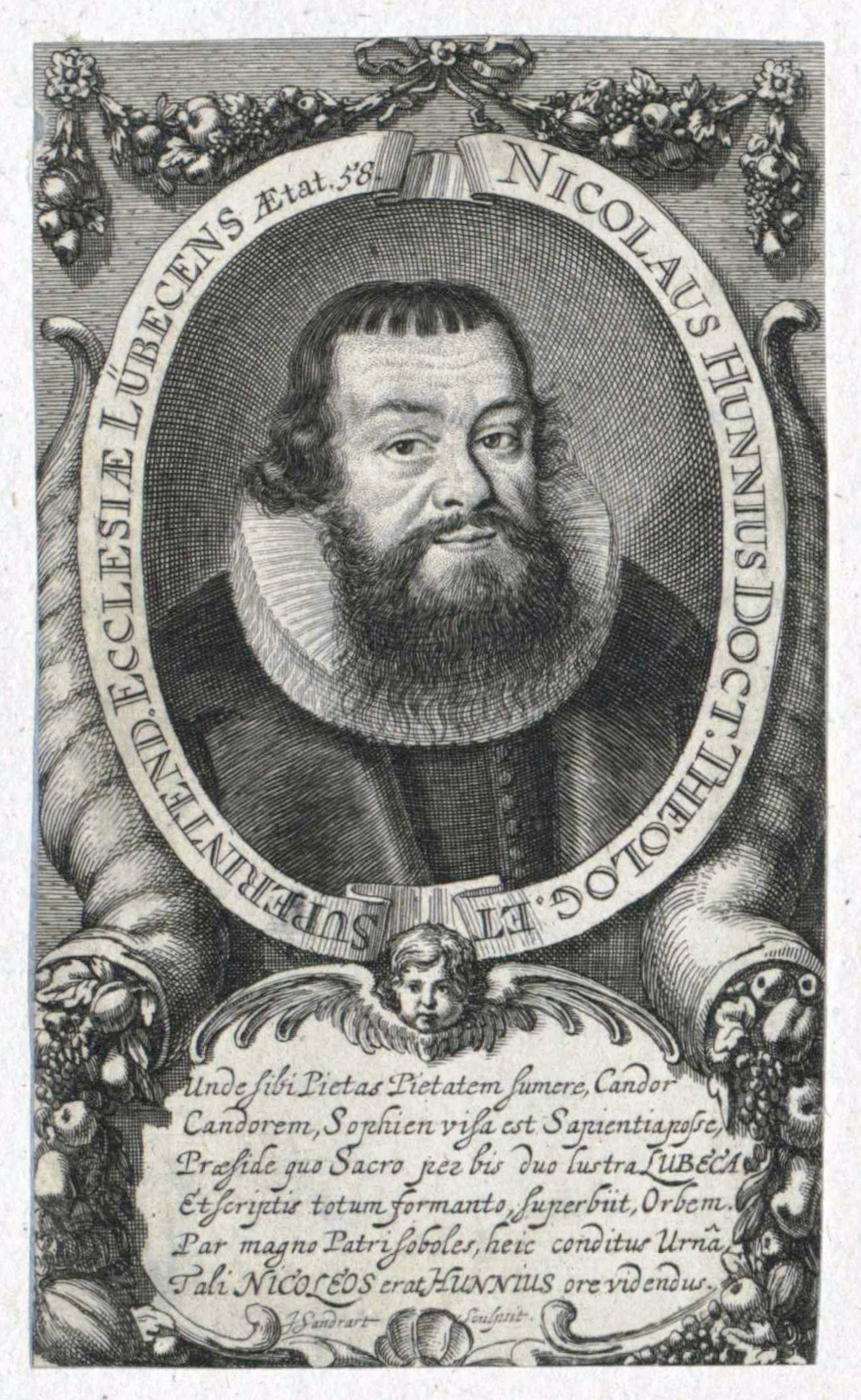
Nicolaus Hunnius

Nicolaus Hunnius (11 July 1585 – 12 April 1643) was an orthodox Lutheran theologian of the Lutheran scholastic tradition.

Hunnius was born at Marburg, the third son of Egidius Hunnius. At the age of fifteen he entered the University of Wittenberg, where he studied philology, philosophy, and theology. In 1609 he joined the philosophical faculty and lectured in philosophy and theology. He followed the same theological direction as his father, inherited his temper and talent as a polemist, and was like him, possessed of great learning. In virtue of his ability Elector John George I. of Saxony appointed him, in 1612, superintendent of Eilenburg, where he won the respect of his superiors and the affection of his congregation. In 1617 Hunnius was called to succeed Leonhard Hutter, at Wittenberg, as professor of theology. In 1623 he was appointed pastor of St. Mary's Church at Lübeck; the following year he became superintendent. For the suppression of the enthusiasts who pervaded the region, Hunnius reunited the dioceses of Lübeck, Hamburg, and Lüneburg (Ministrium tripolitanum), and at a convention held in 1633 at Mölln measures were proposed and adopted for the same purpose. For the suppression of the adherents of Calvinism Hunnius frustrated the efforts of John Durie, who tried to establish harmony between the Lutherans and the Reformed. To check the proselytizing tendencies of the Roman Catholics, he even invoked the aid of the secular powers. At the same time he made earnest efforts to elevate the religious and ecclesiastical life. He died at Lübeck, aged 57.

== Works ==
It was however, chiefly his polemical literary activity that made Hunnius known among his contemporaries. He wrote against the Roman Church Ministerii Lutherani divini adeoque legitimi demonstratio (Wittenberg, 1614) and Capistrum Hunnio paratum, etc. (1617); against the Socinians, whom he considered as Photinians, Examen errorum Photinianorum, 1620); and against the enthusiasts, Christliche Betrachtung (1622), Nedder Sächsisches Handtbaeck (Lübeek, 1633), Ausführlicher Bericht von der neuen Propheten Religion, Lehr und Glauben, etc. (Lübeck, 1634; 2d ed. by J. H. Feustking, Wittenberg, 1708, under the title Mataeologia fanatica). Against the unionistic tendencies of John Durie he wrote Ministerii ecclesiastici Lubecensis theologica Consideratio interpositionis, seu pacificatoriae transactionis, inter religionen Lutheranam ex una, et Reformatam ex altera parta profitentes, abs D. Johanne Duraeo, ecclesiaste Britanno, his temporibus tentatae (Lübeck,1677). Another writing during his activity at Lübeck is his Diaskepsis theologica de fundamentali, dissensu doctrinae Evangelicae Lutheranae et Calvinianae seu Reformatae, (Wittenberg, 1626), which is important in so far as the distinction between fundamental articles and non-fundamental articles of faith may be traced to it. (An English translation of “Diaskepsis theologica” was published in 2001.) But the greatest sensation was created by his Consultatio oder wohlmeinendes Bedenken, ob und wie die evangelisch-lutherischen Kirchen die jetzt schwebenden Religionsstreitigkeiten entweder beilegen oder durch christliche und bequems Mittel fortstellen und endigen mögen (Lübeck, 1632). Here he proposed the institution of a perpetual theological senate for the purpose of investigating and settling all theological disputes. Among his didactic writings may be mentioned the Epitome credendorum oder Inhalt der christlichen Lehre, etc. (Wittenberg, 1625). This work ran through nineteen editions, and was translated into Dutch, Swedish, Polish, and Latin. It is a book of popular instruction in Christianity, was reprinted in 1844 for the seminary of American missionaries at Neuendettelsau (see. Wilhelm Löhe), and a third edition appeared at Nördlingen, 1870. An epitome of it was made the basis of religious instruction in elementary schools.
