= Loci theologici =

Classification of sources in theology

Loci Theologici was a term applied by Melanchthon to Protestant systems of dogmatics and retained by many as late as the seventeenth century. It is also a way of ordering the strength of different sources used in Catholic theology, usually attributed to Melchor Cano, and still in use today.

The word was borrowed, as he himself says, from the usage of the classic rhetoricians, in whose works topoi or loci, denote the places or sources from which proofs are deduced. Various systematized indexes of these loci were made from the days of Aristotle, and mere formal categories, such as "person," "nature," or "fortune," were also reckoned under this head. It was the particular task of the rhetorician, however, to trace the concrete case, or "hypothesis," to the general, or "thesis." Thus were evolved loci communes, or arguments which could be applied to many specific cases. The humanistic rhetoricians frequently confused loci communes with simple loci, or general basal concepts. This was especially true of Melanchthon, as is clear from his De rhetorica libri tres (Cologne, 1519), in which he sought to train students for disputation.

== Lutheran View ==
Melanchthon accordingly advised them to prepare lists of all possible loci communes, and to enter under the proper rubrics (capita) any examples gathered in the course of their reading. Among theological loci communes he lists "faith," "destruction of the body," "Church," "word of God," "patience," "sin," "law," "grace," "love," and "ceremony." Elsewhere he defines loci communes as "certain general rules of living, of which men are persuaded by nature, and which I might not unjustly call the laws of nature." These two definitions, however, are not clearly distinguished and the discussion of the loci communes is consequently somewhat vague.

This criticism applies also to the loci theologici of his famous Loci communes rerum theologicarum (1521), which are primarily basal concepts appearing in the science of theology, to which all in it must be referred. He accordingly begins with his favorite list "God," "one," "triple," and "creation," and closes with "condemnation " and "beatitude." Although this list was derived from Peter Lombard, Melanchthon's treatment is not only more clear than that of his predecessor, but he draws his examples from the Bible instead of from the Church Fathers, and under Pauline influence deduces, in addition to loci communes, certain loci communissimi, such as "sin," "grace," and "law." In view of the long and powerful influence of this book, the result of his failure to give a methodical proof of his series of loci was that Lutheran dogmatics was slow in reaching inherent unity. The term loci theologici gradually came to denote the content, and thus the chief passages of the Bible as included in the individual loci.

For Lutheran theology, Melanchthon's book had the same importance which the work of Peter Lombard possessed for scholasticism. His loci were the subject of commentary as late as Leonhard Hutter, and the term loci communes came to connote any work dealing with the sum of Christian doctrine. Among the Reformed the phrase loci communes was accepted by Wolfgang Musculus (Basel, 1560), Peter Martyr (London, 1576), Johannes Maccovius (Franeker, 1639), and Daniel Chamier (Geneva, 1653). After the middle of the seventeenth century, however, with the rise of a more systematic treatment of dogmatics the term fell into disuse.

== Catholic View ==
Melchor Cano provided a Catholic version of this in his posthumous work, De Locis theologicis (Salamanca, 1562). In this Renaissance work, Cano tried to free Catholic dogmatic theology from the vain subtleties of the schools; by returning to first principles, and by giving rules, method, co-ordination and system, to build up a scientific treatment of theology. In discussing the credibility of sources, he was one of the first to inquire into the principles of the credibility of historical documents. He argues that if all serious historians agree about a fact, then we should believe it, even if it is unlikely. Otherwise "It would be as if the Mediterranean peoples were to deny the existence of the ocean ... or if, indeed, we should mock at him who speaks of elephants." Cano lists 10 Loci theologici: Seven proper to theology: (1) Sacred Scripture,(2) apostolic traditions, (3) the universal Church, (4) Church councils, (5) the papal magisterium, (6) Church Fathers, and (7) theologians and canonists; and three borrowed by theology: (8) natural reason, (9) philosophers and jurists, and (10) history and human tradition.

== See also ==
- Loci Communes
- Lutheran scholasticism
