= Rudolf Hospinian =

Swiss Reformed theologian and controversialist

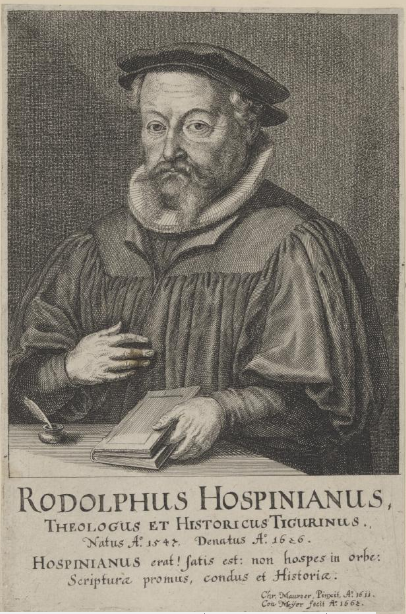

Rudolf Hospinian (7 November 1547 – 11 March 1626), real name Rudolf Wirth, was a Swiss Reformed theologian and controversialist.

== Life ==
He was born in Fehraltorf, Zürich, Switzerland, as son of Adrian Wirth, a minister. He studied in Marburg and Heidelberg in Germany. Returning to Switzerland, he joined the church of Zürich, and was a pastor and schoolteacher. He ministered at Fraumünster from 1594 to 1623, and died in Zurich.

== Works ==
His anti-Catholic writing was against the supposed harmony of Catholic doctrines and institutions with the early Church, concentrating on baptism, the Eucharist, church festivals, fasting, religious orders, the rule of the papacy, and funerals. He wrote:

- De origine et progressu rituum et ceremoniarum ecclesiasticarum (Zurich, 1585);
- De templis, hoc est de origine, progressu et abusu templorum, ac omnia rerum omnium ad templa pertinentium (1587; revised ed., 1603);
- De monachis, seu de origine et progressu monachatus ac ordinum monasticorum, equitum militarium tam sacrorum quam sæcularium omnium (1588; 1609);
- De festia Judæorum et Ethnicorum, hoc est de origine, progressu, ceremoniis et ritibus festorum dierum Christianorum (2 vols., 1592-93; enlarged and revised, 1611 and 1612);
- Historia sacramentaria (2 vols., 1598-1603). The first volume was directed against the Catholic view of the sacraments, and the second treated the sacramental dispute among Protestants, under the title De origine et progressu controversiæ sacramentatiæ de cœna Domini inter Lutheranos et orthodoxos quos Zwinglianos et Calvinistas vocant, exortæ ab anno 1517 usque ad annum 1612.

He was a vocal opponent of the Jesuits, and also attacked the Lutheran Formula of Concord. His final work was Historia Jesuitica (1619; continued by Ludwig Lucius, 1632). A partial English translation was made. Polemical works against Lutherans included his Concordia discors, seu de origines et progressu formulæ concordiæ Bergensis (1607), which was directed against the Formula of Concord. Leonard Hutter answered in his Concordia concors (1614). A collected edition of Hospinian's works appeared at Geneva, 1681 (7 vols.), with a life by J. H. Heidegger.
