= Johannes Andreas Quenstedt =

German theologian

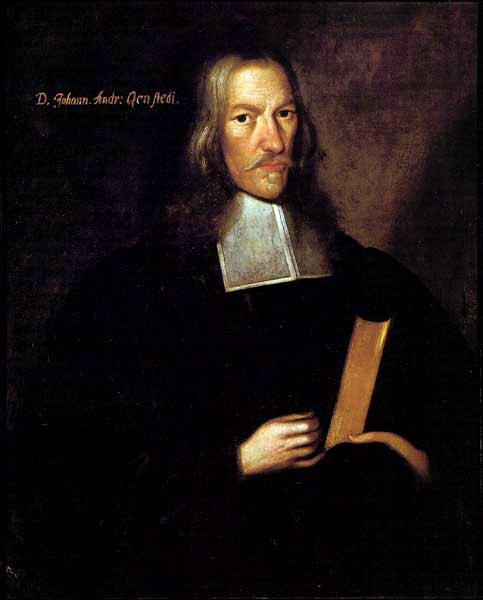
- Portrait of Johann Andreas Quenstedt
- Born: 13 August 1617; Quedlinburg
- Died: 22 May 1688 (aged 70); Wittenberg
- Scientific career
- Fields: Theology
- Doctoral advisor: Georg Calixt; Christoph Notnagel

Johannes Andreas Quenstedt (13 August 1617 – 22 May 1688) was a German Lutheran dogmatician in the Lutheran scholastic tradition.

Quenstedt was born at Quedlinburg, a nephew of Johann Gerhard. He was educated at the University of Helmstedt, 1637–1643, and at the University of Wittenberg, 1644, where afterwards he lectured on geography; was adjunct professor in the philosophical faculty, 1646–1649; ordinary professor of logic and metaphysics and associate professor of theology, 1649–1660; and ordinary professor of theology, 1660–1688 until his death.

Quenstedt represents the old orthodox reaction after the period of reconstruction had set in. The fruit of his thirty years of work in the university lectureship was published in the Theologia didactico-polemica sive systema theologicum (Wittenberg, 1685; Leipzig, 1715), a work according to the strictest standard of Lutheran orthodoxy, based upon the Theologia, positiva acroamatica of his teacher, Johann Friedrich König, and characterized by external dogmatization instead of a development of the subject from within, and abounding in artful scholastic refinements.

Quenstedt was noted among his contemporaries for his mild, irenic spirit and retiring, pious disposition, which is also shown by his Ethica pastorum et instructio cathedralis (1678), in which he advises to temper severity with gentleness in resisting heretics, and to distinguish between the tempters and the tempted; warns against pedantry in the pulpit; and recommends the reading of Johann Arndt's Vom wahren Christenthum. His other works include the Dialogus de patriis illustrium doctrina et scriptis virorum (Wittenberg, 1654), and a collection of dissertations, Exercitationes de theologia in genere ejusque principio sancta scriptura (1677).

== Theology ==
Quenstedt believed in conditional election: "Faith, and that, too, as persevering or final faith, enters into the sphere of eternal election, not as already afforded, but as foreknown."
