= Joachim Lütkemann =

German Lutheran theologian and writer

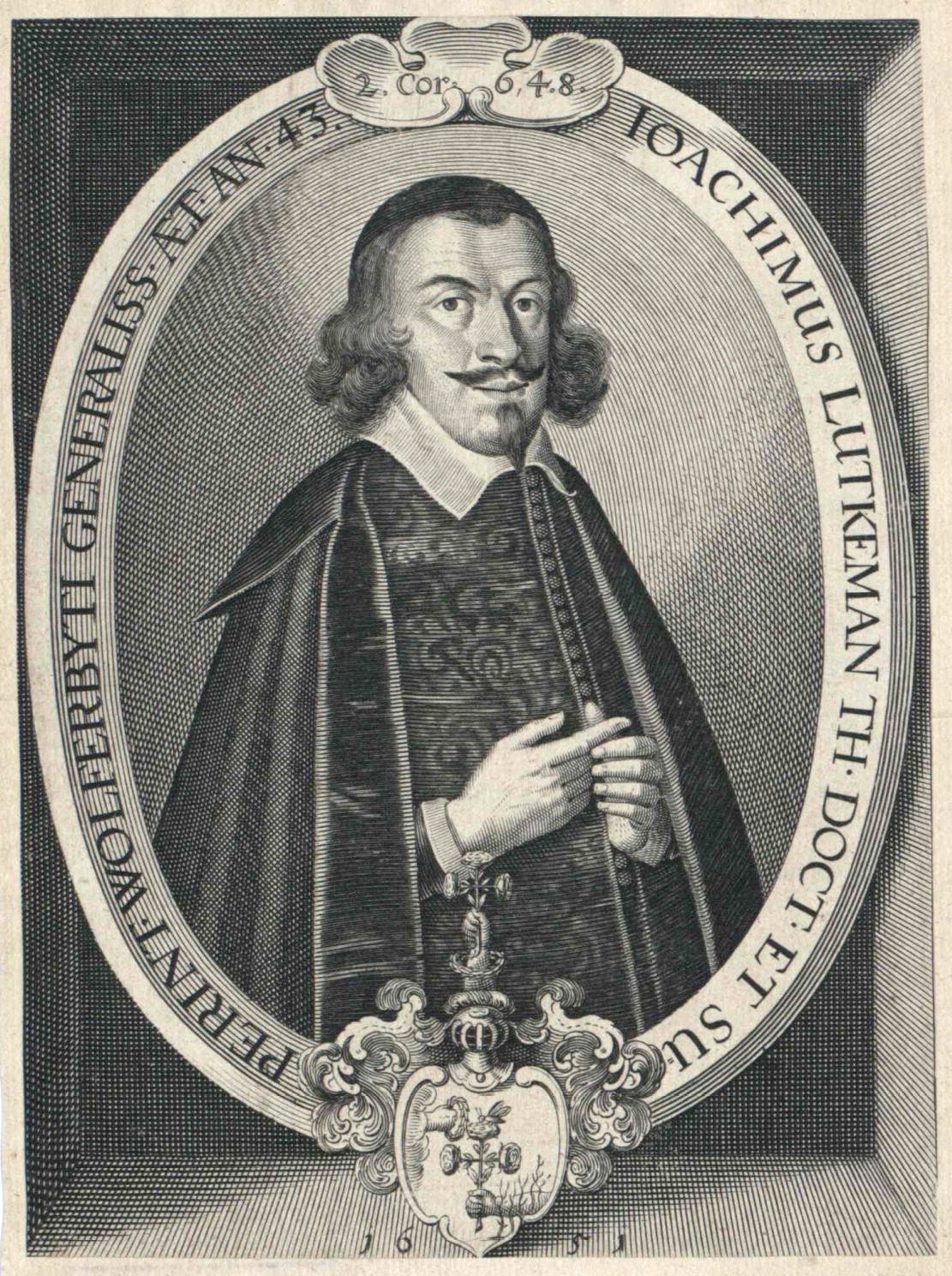
Joachim Lütkemann (1651)

Joachim Lütkemann (15 December 1608, Demmin - 18 October 1655, Wolfenbüttel) was a German Lutheran theologian and writer of devotional literature.

== Life ==
Joachim Lütkemann was the son of Samuel Lütkemann, an apothecary from Demmin who had become mayor, and his wife Katharina, née Zander. After attending school in Demmin, he went to university in Greifswald in 1624, then in 1626 to the Marienstiftsgymnasium in Stettin. From 1629–1634he then studied philosophy and theology at the University of Strasbourg, where he was especially influenced by the teachings of Johann Conrad Dannhauer and Johann Schmidt, and later by those of Philipp Jakob Spener. After a study-trip to France and Italy, he joined the University of Rostock in November 1637, graduating from it in 1638 as a magister legens.

In 1639 he became a deacon in the Jakobikirche in Rostock and later that year was elected to replace the lately-deceased Zacharias Deutsch as archdeacon, also marrying Deutsch's widow Dorothea. In 1643 he became the Professor of Metaphysics and Physics in the University of Rostock. In 1646 he disputed on De viribus naturae et gratiae at the University of Greifswald pro licentia. From November 1646 he taught theology classes in Rostock and was chosen as the university's rector. In 1648 in Greifswald he was promoted De baptismo to Doctor of Theology.

In 1649 Lütkemann presented his thesis that during his three days in the tomb (tempore mortis) Jesus Christ was not truly human, since there was the soul had left the body and so there was not the human connection between the soul and body that there had been in life. Lütkemann's true intention was to say that the death of the son of God was real, but this led to a controversy with the Rostock theologian Johann Cothmann. Lütkemann was then denounced as a heretic and dismissed by Adolf Frederick I, Duke of Mecklenburg. Lütkemann asked for the suspension to be lifted but this was conditional on signing a recantation, which Lütkemann was unwilling to do, so he left the country.

Lütkemann then followed the court of Augustus the Younger, Duke of Brunswick-Wolfenbüttel, where he became court-preacher and Generalsuperintendent. There, in 1651, he set up a new education policy introducing compulsory schooling. From 1650 to 1653 he led a general visitation. In 1653 he was made abbot of Riddagshausen Abbey.

== Family ==
In 1639 Joachim Lütkemann married Dorothea von Levetzow (1612–1666), the widow of Zacharias Deutsch. They had twelve children, of which five died in infancy. In 1734 his great-nephew Timotheus Lütkemann became Generalsuperintendent in Greifswald.

== Works ==
His literary work was very prolific and, though his writings on philosophical and dogmatic themes were of little importance, they influenced the devotional writers Heinrich Müller, Christian Scriver and Theophil Großgebauer.

- Der Vorschmack göttlicher Güte. 1653, 1673. - His first work, whose title translates as Foretaste of divine goodness. It became one of the most popular devotional works in Lutheranism. Lütkemann's approach in that work was mystical spiritualism, though he also tried to distance himself from that approach at the same time, describing the necessary connection between inner faith and outer words. It was influenced by Johann Arndt's work Vier Bücher vom wahren Christentum and was highly esteemed by Philipp Jacob Spener, who made it compulsory reading in his first collegia pietatis.
- Regenten Predigt (von der höchsten Tugend hoher Obrigkeit, über Psalm 37 V. 34). 1655. - A sermon first pronounced in September 1655, in which he criticised contemporary rulers' notions of absolutism and contrasted them with the notions of piety.
- Harpffe von zehen Seyten, Das ist: Gründliche Erklärung Zehen Psalmen Davids. 1658. - A work on the Psalms of David.

== Bibliography ==
- Hartmut Lohmann (1993). "Joachim Lütkemann". In Bautz, Traugott (ed.). Biographisch-Bibliographisches Kirchenlexikon (BBKL) (in German). Vol. 5. Herzberg: Bautz. cols. 399–401. ISBN 3-88309-043-3.
- Rudolf Mohr (1987). "Lütkemann, Joachim". Neue Deutsche Biographie (in German). Vol. 15. Berlin: Duncker & Humblot. pp. 482–483.
- Julius August Wagenmann (1884). "Lütkemann, Joachim". Allgemeine Deutsche Biographie (in German). Vol. 19. Leipzig: Duncker & Humblot. pp. 696–699.
- (in German) Johannes Wallmann: Theologie und Frömmigkeit im Zeitalter des Barock. Mohr Siebeck, Tübingen 1995, ISBN 3-16-146351-X, S. 82–86.
- (in German) Wolfgang Sommer: Gottesfurcht und Fürstenherrschaft. Studien zum Obrigkeitsverständnis Johann Arndts und lutherischer Hofprediger zur Zeit der altprotestantischen Orthodoxie. Vandenhoeck u. Ruprecht, Göttingen 1988, ISBN 3-525-55148-7.
- (in German) Philipp Julius Rehtmeyer: Nachricht von den Schicksalen, Schriften und Gaben des um die Evangelische Kirche Hochverdienten Theologi, D. Joachim Lütkemanns. Braunschweig 1740.
