= David Hollatz (dogmatician) =

German Lutheran theologian (1648–1713)

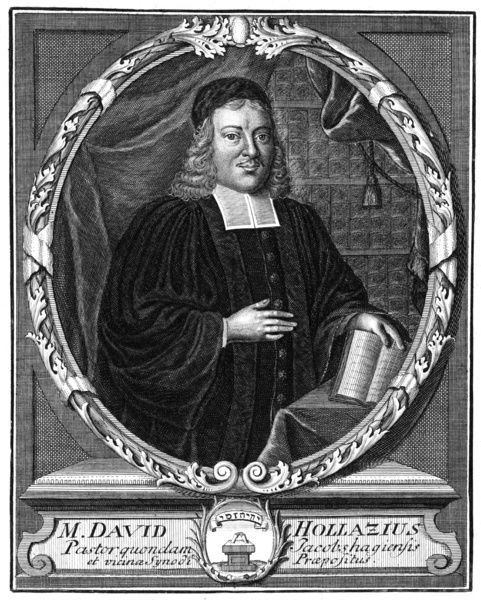
Hollatz

David Hollatz (1648 – 17 April 1713) was a German Lutheran theologian.

== Life ==
Born in 1648, in Wulkow, near Stargard (34 km ESE of Stettin), in Pomerania.

He studied at Erfurt and Wittenberg, and became preacher at Pützerlin near Stargard in 1670, at Stargard in 1681 (in 1683 also conrector), rector in Colberg in 1684, and pastor in Jakobshagen in 1692.

He died at Jakobshagen (24 km E of Stargard) on 17 April 1713.

== Works ==
His principal work is his Examen theologicum acroamaticum (Rostock – afterward Stockholm – and Leipzig, 1707; 7th and 8th eds. by Romanus Teller, 1750 and 1763). The work is the last of the strict Lutheran systems of dogmatics in the era of Lutheran orthodoxy. Hollatz knows Pietism, but does not mention it, although he refutes mysticism. The system is divided into quaestiones, which are explained by probationes; these are followed by antitheses, against which the different instantia are brought forward. Hollatz also published Scrutinium veritatis in mysticorum dogmata (Wittenberg, 1711); Ein gottgeheiligt dreifaches Kleeblatt (Leidender Jesus) (1713); a collection of sermons; and other works.

== Theology ==
Hollatz believed in conditional election: "Predestination is the eternal decree of God to bestow eternal salvation upon all of whom God foresaw that they would finally believe in Christ."

According to Robert Preus, Hollaz is significant in further defining Lutheran beliefs in relation to fundamental and non-fundamental articles, a topic hotly debated during the time. For Hollaz, primary fundamental articles could be divided into a three-fold taxonomy: constituent, antecedent, and consequent. In this way Hollaz was able to define and order articles based on their salvific import, although his system was not without disagreement among other Lutheran scholastics.

== Translated works ==
From Examen Theologicum Acroamaticum

- The Restoration and Resurrection of the Dead (Part I) Tr. by Kirk E. Lahmann
- The Restoration and Resurrection of the Dead (Part II) Tr. by Kirk E. Lahmann
- The Highest Mystery of the Most Holy Trinity in the Old Testament Tr. by Nathaniel J. Biebert
- Baptism and the Means of Salvation Tr. by Nathaniel J. Biebert
