= Neology =

Lutheran theology from 18th-19th century

Neology ("study of new [things]") was the name given to the rationalist theology of Germany or the rationalisation of the Christian religion. It was preceded by slightly less radical Wolffism.

Chambers English Dictionary of 1872 adds the application of this term specifically to new theological doctrines, especially those arising from German Rationalism: which would have been by those who deprecated them.

The Swedish encyclopaedia Nationalencyklopedin defines neology as a type of Protestant theology during the second half of 18th century, to large extent formed by ideas from the Enlightenment including British deism.

According to Encyclopaedia Britannica, neology was based on the downplaying of revelation, fulfillment of biblical prophecies, and miracles, in favor of reason as the most important tool for understanding God. Important figures were the philosopher Christian Wolff (1679–1754) and theologian Johann Salomo Semler (1725–1791). Neology dominated Lutheranism during the late 18th century.
