= Salomo Glassius =

German theologian (1593–1656)

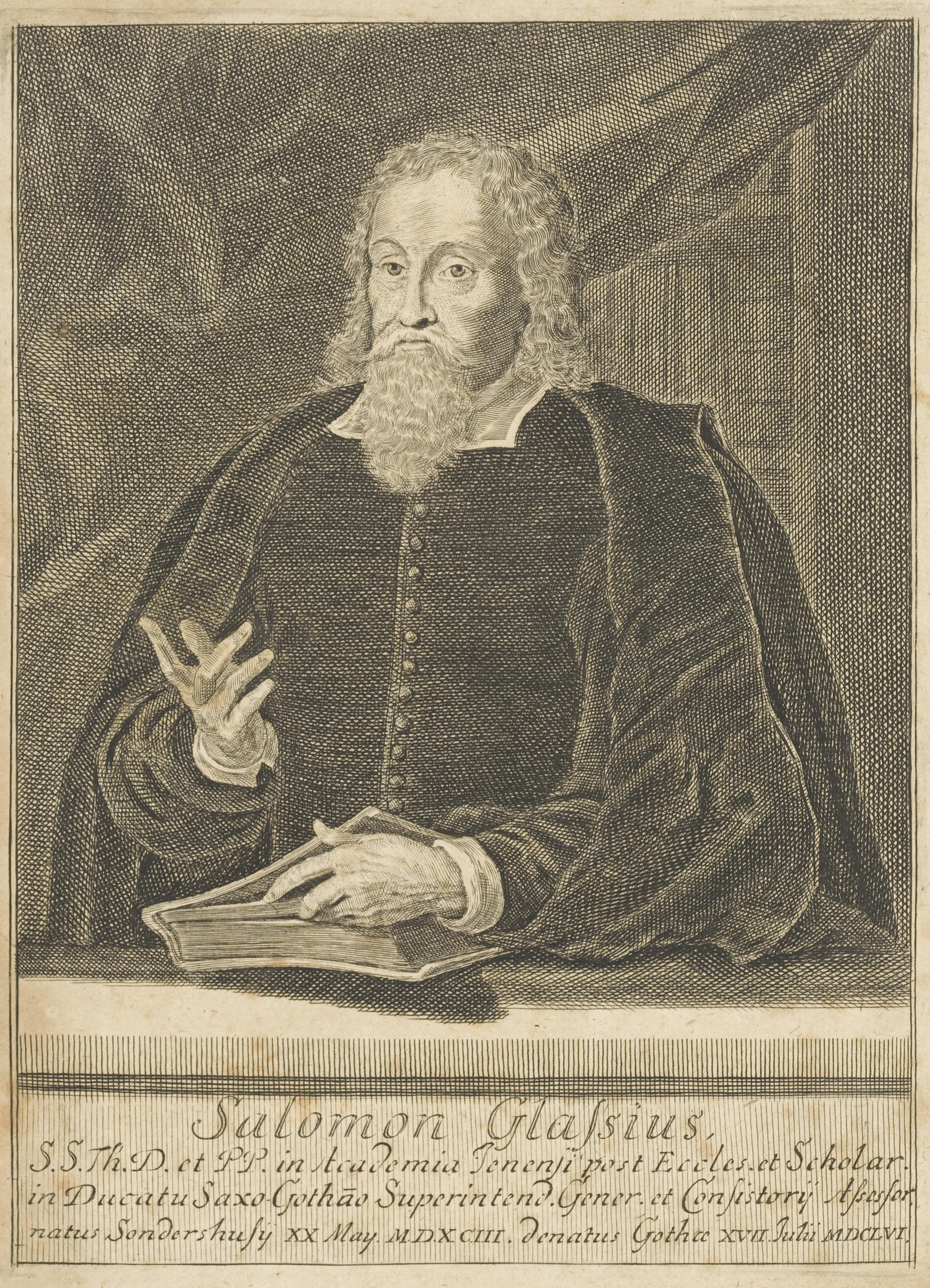
Salomo Glassius

Salomo Glassius (German: Salomon Glaß; 20 May 1593 – 27 July 1656) was a German theologian and biblical critic born at Sondershausen, in the principality of Schwarzburg-Sondershausen.

In 1612, he entered the University of Jena. In 1615, with the intent of studying law, he moved to Wittenberg. Due to illness, he returned to Jena after a year. Here, as a student of theology under Johann Gerhard, he directed his attention especially to Hebrew and the cognate dialects. In 1619 he was made an adjunctus of the philosophical faculty. He later was appointment as Professor of Hebrew.

From 1625 to 1638, he was superintendent in Sondershausen. Shortly after the death of Gerhard (1637) he was, in accordance with Gerhard's last wish, appointed to succeed him at Jena. Later, at the earnest invitation of Duke Ernest the Pious, he relocated in 1640 to Gotha as court preacher and general superintendent in the execution of important reforms which had been initiated in the ecclesiastical and educational establishments of the Duchy. He played a role in the Syncretistic Controversy. His principal work, Philologia sacra (1623), marked the transition from the earlier views on questions of biblical criticism to those of the school of Spener. It was more than once reprinted during his lifetime, and appeared in a new and revised form, edited by J. A. Dathe (1731-1791) and G. L. Bauer at Leipzig. Glassius succeeded Gerhard as editor of the Weimar Bibelwerk, one of the Elector Bibles, this particular one called the Nuremberg Bible. He wrote the commentary on the poetical books of the Old Testament for that publication. A volume of his Opuscula was printed at Leiden in 1700.

Glassius died in Gotha on 27 July 1656, aged 63.
