= Christian Scriver =

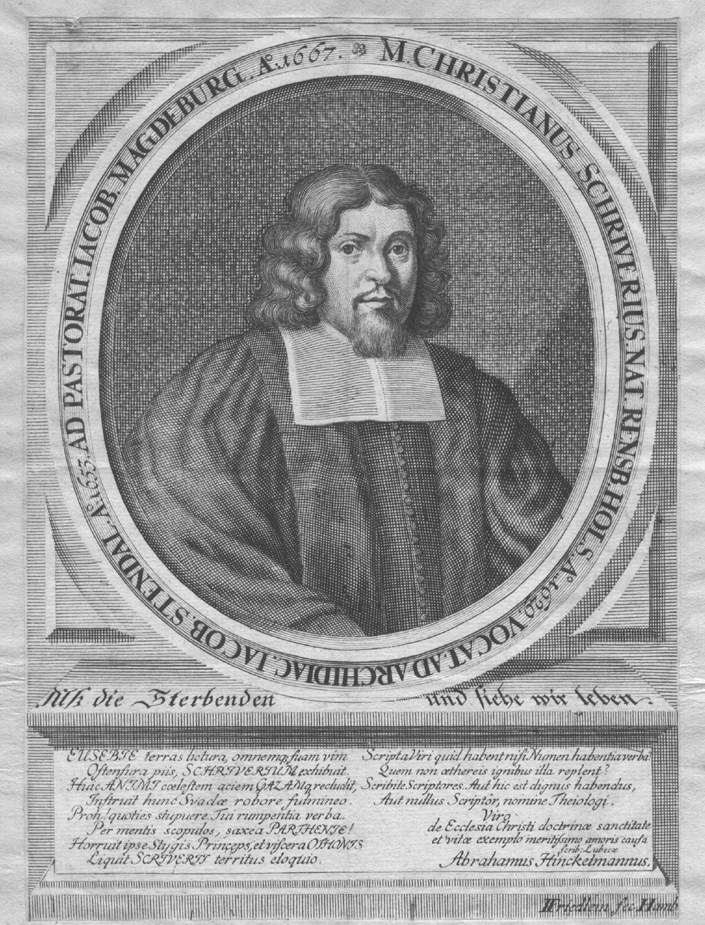
Christian Scriver.

Christian Scriver (2 January 1629 – 5 April 1693) was a German Lutheran minister and devotional writer.

== Biography ==
Christian Scriver was born at Rendsburg in the Duchy of Schleswig, Germany. He entered the University of Rostock in 1647. He was awarded a master's degree in Theology in 1651. During 1653, he was appointed archdeacon at Stendal. He was called in 1667 to Magdeburg in Saxony as pastor of St. James's Church (Sankt-Jakobi-Kirche Magdeburg). Here he remained twenty-three years, until in 1690 he was made chief court chaplain at Quedlinburg, a position which he held until his death.

The friend of Philipp Jakob Spener, Scriver was one of those theologians of the latter part of the seventeenth century who opposed the formalism then besetting Lutheranism, and thus prepared the way for Pietism, even while himself maintaining strict orthodoxy. Scriver died in Quedlinburg.

The writings of Scriver were devotional, including Gottholds vierhundert zufällige Andachten (1667; last ed., Basel, 1893; Eng. transl., (Gotthold's Emblems: or, Invisible Things understood by Things that are made), by R. Menzies, Edinburgh, 1857), a collection of 400 parables; Gotthold's Siech- und Siegesbette (1687; new ed., Stuttgart, 1870); and Chrysologia Catechetica, Goldpredigten über die Hauptstücke des lutherischen Katechismus (1687; new ed., Stuttgart, 1861). The collected works of Scriver have been edited by J. H. Heinrich and R. Stier (6 vols., Barmen, 1847–52).

His most important work was Seelen-Schatz ("The Soul's Treasure", 5 parts, 1675-1692; new ed., 3 vols., Berlin, 1852–53), describing the progress of the soul from misery to eternal life and combining allegory, dogmatics, and ethics. It has been translated into numerous languages, including Norwegian, Danish, Swedish and Finnish.

Scriver was also a hymn-writer, though his hymns never gained wide acceptance. A number of his compositions have been translated into English including Auf, Seel, und danke deinem Herrn ("To God, my soul, thank-offerings pay") and Hier lieg ich nun, mein Gott, zu deinen Füssen ("Here, O my God, I cast me at Thy feet"). His most well-known hymn Den lieben Sonne Licht und Pracht ("Love the sun light and splendor") is found in a number of renderings.

== See also ==
- Lutheran Orthodoxy

== Other sources ==
- Lund, Eric (2011) Seventeenth-Century Lutheran Meditations and Hymns (New York: Paulist Press) ISBN 9780809147298
