= Johann Conrad Dannhauer =

German theologian (1603–1666)

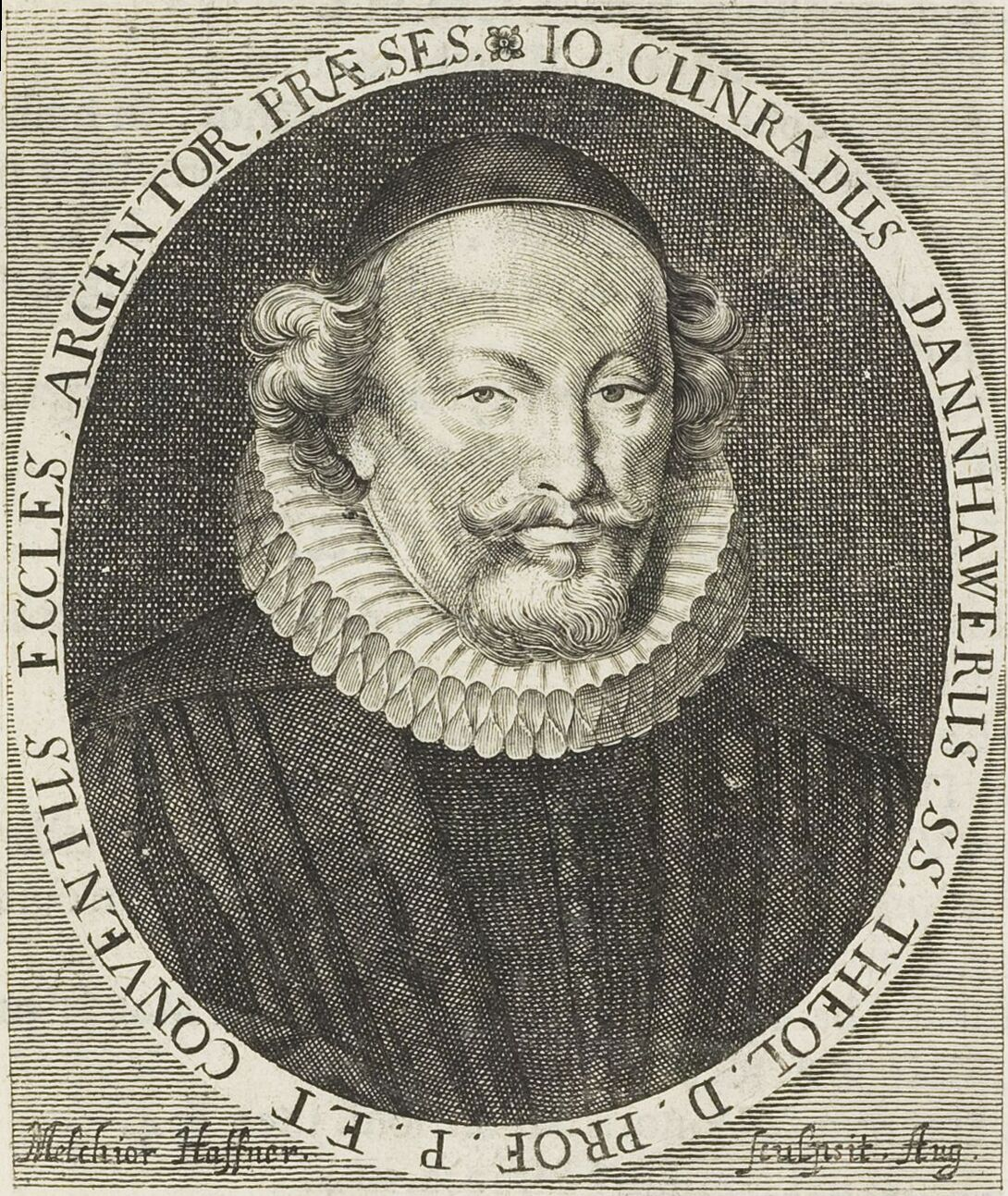
Johann Conrad Dannhauer

Johann Conrad Dannhauer (b. at Köndringen (10 m. n. of Freiburg) 24 March 1603; d. at Strasburg 7 November 1666) was an Orthodox Lutheran theologian and teacher of Spener.

Dannhauer began his education in the gymnasium at Strasburg and was the master of a thorough philosophical training before he commenced his theological work in 1624. He continued his studies at Marburg, Altorf, and Jena, lecturing at the same time on philosophy and linguistics and winning recognition at Jena by his exegesis of the Epistle to the Ephesians. Returning to Strasburg in 1628, he entered upon an active career as administrator, teacher, and theologian. Made seminary inspector in 1628, he became in the following year professor of oratory, and in 1633 professor of theology, pastor of the cathedral, and president of the ecclesiastical assembly. Although the judgment of his contemporaries, Bebel, Spener, and others, placed him in the front rank of the theologians of the time, Dannhauer has received scant justice at the hands of posterity. The influence exerted upon Spener by his teacher must not be underestimated because of the formal tone of the poem dedicated by the founder of the Pietists to his teacher's memory. Their relations were certainly not characterized by the warmth of personal friendship, but were rather in the nature of an intercourse based on common interests. Dannhauer ordained Spener, and in all probability secured for him the post of private tutor at the court of the elector palatine. Spener, in return, seems to have been connected with the preparation of the second edition of the Hodosophia for the press and to have acted as critic of another work of Dannhauer's which has not yet been identified. The estrangement between the two was apparently caused by Dannhauer's nephew, Balthasar Bebel, who was in control of the theological faculty at Strasburg at the time of the publication of Spener's Pia desideria. Dannhauer was a prolific writer, his principal works being as follows: Hodosophia christiana sive theologia positiva (1649); Katechismusmilch oder Erklärung des kirchlichen Katechismus (1657–78) and Liber conscientiae apertus sive theologia conscientiaria (1662–67).
