= Stephan Praetorius =

German theologian

Stephan Prætorius
- Stephan Prätorius
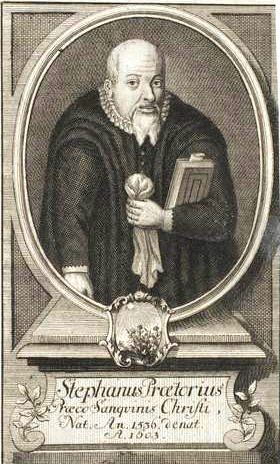
- Stephan Prætorius
- Born: 3 May 1536; Salzwedel
- Died: 4 May 1603 (aged 67); Salzwedel
- Occupation(s): minister, author
- Notable work: Acht-und-fünfzig schöne, auserlesne, geist- und trostreiche Traktätlein
- Theological work
- Language: German

Stephan Praetorius (or Prætorius) (German: Stephan Prätorius; 3 May 1536, in Salzwedel – 4 May 1603, in Salzwedel) was a German Lutheran theologian and pastor.

== His life and work ==
Prætorius was born in Salzwedel, Margraviate of Brandenburg. He was educated at the University of Rostock, (Note: This article incorporates text from a publication in the public domain: Jackson, Samuel Macauley, ed. (1911). "Prætorius, Stephan". New Schaff–Herzog Encyclopedia of Religious Knowledge. Vol. 9 (third ed.). London and New York: Funk and Wagnalls. p. 151.) where he also taught in the local schools; was ordained by Agricola at Berlin in 1565; became preacher in the same year at the monastery of the Holy Ghost at Salzwedel, and soon after deacon of the Church of St. Mary's; and from 1569 until his death was pastor in Salzwedel.

A great admirer of Martin Luther, and an opponent of Jesuitism and Calvinism alike, Prætorius laid great stress on the sacraments, though not in the Roman Catholic sense, and held to justification by faith, though he also insisted on purity of life.

He was a precursor of Johann Arndt and Philipp Jakob Spener, though not Pietist in the narrow sense. His lack of caution brought upon him the charges of antinomianism and "perfectionism", the latter theory later even being called "Prætorianism". Through his tracts, published by him or his friends after 1570, Prætorius exercised an influence far beyond his own congregation. These were collected and published by Arndt under the title Acht-und-fünfzig schöne, auserlesne, geist- und trostreiche Traktätlein (Lüneburg, 1622), containing also fourteen hymns with their melodies, one of them being "Was hat gethan der heilige Christ?" Prætorius was also one of the few Protestant theologians of his century who exhorted the Christianity to comply with the worldwide proclamation of the Gospel.

Prætorius' tracts were later arranged in the form of dialogues, with certain moderations, by M. Statius in his Geistliche Schatzkammer der Gläubigen (Lüneburg, 1636, and often). There arose over his writings the Prætorian controversy, Abraham Calovius assailing the view of Prætorius and Statius that the faithful possess salvation not only in prospect but in reality. Spener's antagonist, G. C. Dilfeld, considered Prætorius akin to Esaias Stiefel, and the general superintendent of Greifswald, Tiburtius Rango, secured the prohibition of the Schatzkammer in Swedish Pomerania. Despite all this, Prætorius' writings were continually read, and in the second quarter of the 17th century, they influenced a circle of converts in Cottbus and its vicinity. Spener frequently alludes to him admiringly, and the Schatzkammer has been revised by the Kornthal pastor J. H. Stoudt (Stuttgart, 1869).
