= Leonhard Hutter =

German Lutheran theologian (1563–1616)

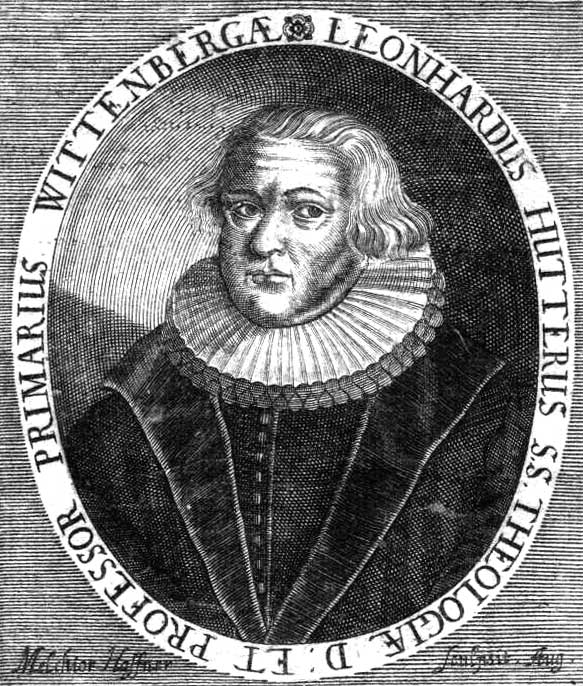
Leonhard Hutter

Leonhard Hutter (also Hütter, Latinized as Hutterus; 19 January 1563 – 23 October 1616) was a German Lutheran theologian.

== Life ==
He was born at Nellingen near Ulm. From 1581 he studied at the universities of Strasbourg, Leipzig, Heidelberg and Jena. He earned his Doctorate in Theology through a disputation in 1593 titled "On Predestination" under the supervision of George Mylius. In 1594 he began to give theological lectures at Jena, and in 1596 accepted a call as professor of theology at Wittenberg. He replaced Samuel Huber in Wittenberg and worked to reverse the trend towards Crypto-Calvinism in the birthplace of the Reformation. He died in Wittenberg after 20 years.

== Works ==
Hutter was a stern champion of Lutheran orthodoxy, as set down in the Lutheran confessions and embodied in his own Compendium locorum theologicorum (1610; reprinted 1863). Many schools in Saxony adopted the Compendium as the official theological textbook. Hutter remained faithful to the Lutheran tradition and won the titles of "Luther redonatus" (Luther restored) and "Malleus Calvinistarum" (Hammer of the Calvinists).

In reply to Rudolf Hospinian's Concordia discors (1607), he wrote a work, rich in historical material but one-sided in its argument, Concordia concors (1614), defending the Formula of Concord, which he regarded as inspired. Hutter's works demonstrate a thorough understanding of the context and sources for the Book of Concord. His Irenicum vere christianum is directed against David Pareus (1548–1622), professor primarius at Heidelberg, who in Irenicum sive de unione et synodo Evangelicorum (1614) had pleaded for a reconciliation of Lutheranism and Calvinism. His Calvinista aulico-politicus (1610) was written against the "damnable Calvinism" which was becoming prevalent in Holstein and Brandenburg. Hutter wrote so vehemently against the conversion of Elector John Sigismund of Brandenburg that the Elector forbade Brandenburgers from attending the University of Wittenberg. In the context of his anti-Calvinist polemics, Hutter wrote a great deal about predestination, free will and universal grace. Another work Loci communes theologici was based on Phillip Melanchthon’s Loci communes. Each locus comments on Melanchthon’s locus, corrects or reframes the doctrine where deemed appropriate, and reviews the historical reception of the doctrine (especially in 16th-century religious history).

== Death ==
Leonhard Hutter died aged 53 on 23 October 1616 in Wittenberg of a feverish illness, shortly after being honored with his fourth term as Rector of the University of Wittenberg. According to Balthasar Meisner’s funeral sermon, his passing was sudden and deeply mourned within the theological faculty and the wider Lutheran community. Meisner compared Hutter’s role in Lutheran theology to that of Martin Luther himself, writing of the first Lutheran century, "Lutherus incepit, Hutterus finijt" (Luther began it; Hutter finished it), emphasizing his status as a defender of orthodox Lutheran doctrine during a time of growing Calvinist and Jesuit influence.

== Legacy ==
Hutter’s legacy endured through his published works, which became standard references in Lutheran scholastic theology. Hutter was celebrated by some for his unwavering commitment to the Formula of Concord and his vigorous opposition to Reformed theology and Roman Catholic polemics. His writings, including the Concordia Concors and Irenicum verè Christianum, were praised for their clarity and strength in preserving Lutheran orthodoxy. His efforts to articulate and defend confessional unity earned him recognition as one of the great systematizers of Lutheran thought in the early seventeenth century. Schaff summarizes Hutter's legacy:

He has been regarded as the prototype of orthodox Lutheran dogmatics and polemics. No one has confined himself more strictly within the borders of the Lutheran doctrine as authorized and formulated by the Church; no one has adhered with greater faithfulness not only to the spirit, but to the letter of the Lutheran symbols, especially of the Formula of Concord, to which he ascribed almost the character of inspiration. He did not recognize a developing dogmatics; for him dogma was fixed and crystallized, and he considered it as the objective norm against all attacks of other churches and sects.
