= Johann Friedrich König =

German Lutheran theologian

Johann Friedrich König (also: Köning; 16 October 1619 – 15 September 1664) was a German Lutheran theologian, born in Dresden. From 1656 he was a professor at the university of Rostock. He died in Rostock, aged 44.
