= Loci communes =

1521 work by Philipp Melanchthon

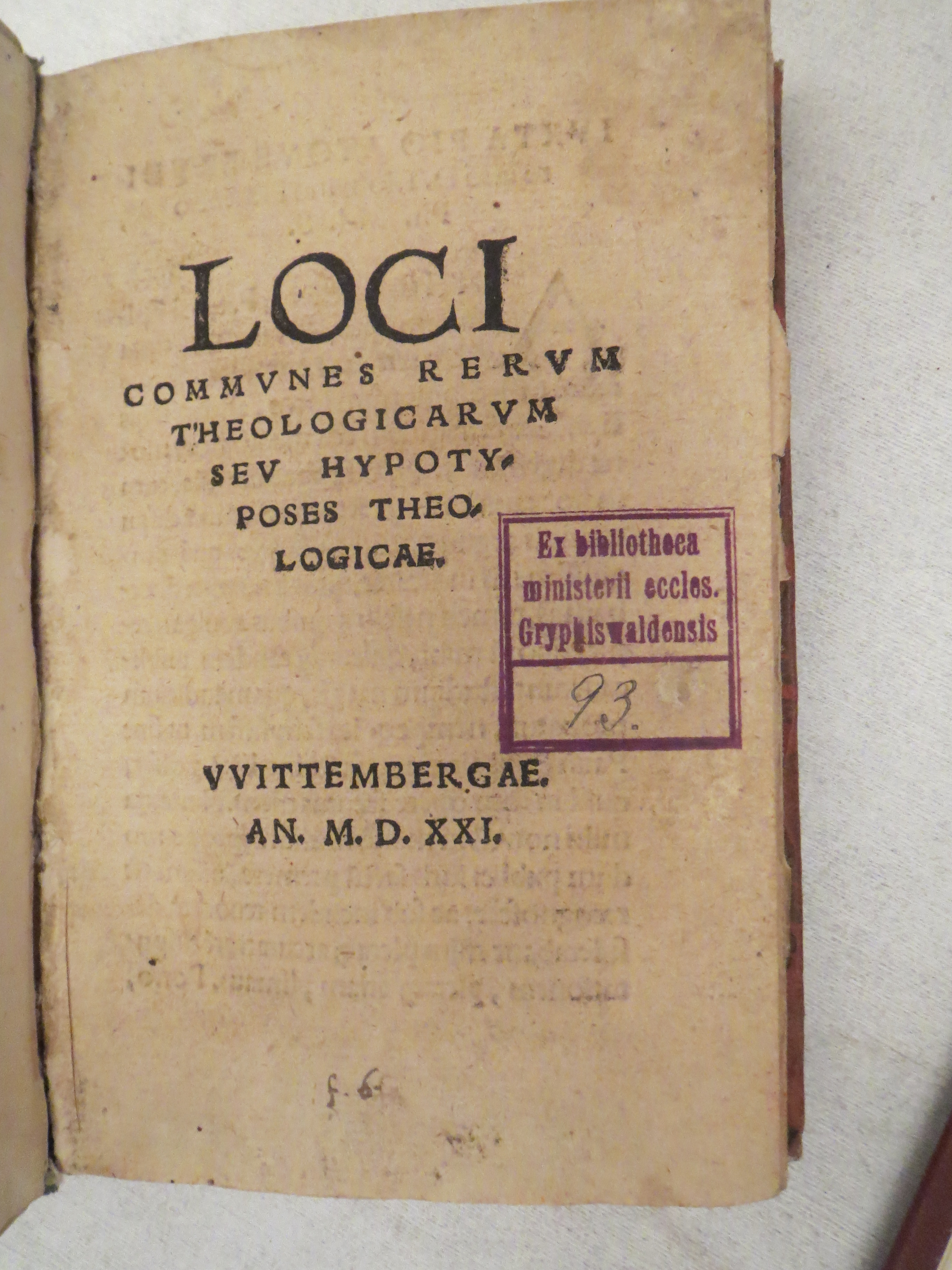

Loci communes or Loci communes rerum theologicarum seu hypotyposes theologicae (Latin for Common Places in Theology or Fundamental Doctrinal Themes) was a work by the Lutheran theologian Philipp Melanchthon published in 1521 (other, modified editions were produced during the life of the author in 1535, 1543 and 1559). Martin Luther said of it, "Next to Holy Scripture, there is no better book," and its existence is often given as a reason that Luther never wrote a systematic theology of his own. In an overture to the English king, Henry VIII, to gain the English crown as converts to Lutheran protestantism, Melanchthon provided a dedication to the king in one of his printed editions.

The book lays out Christian doctrine by discussing the "leading thoughts" from the Epistle to the Romans, and they were intended to guide the reader to a proper understanding of the Bible in general.
