= Johann Friedrich Mayer (theologian) =

German Lutheran theologian (1650–1712)

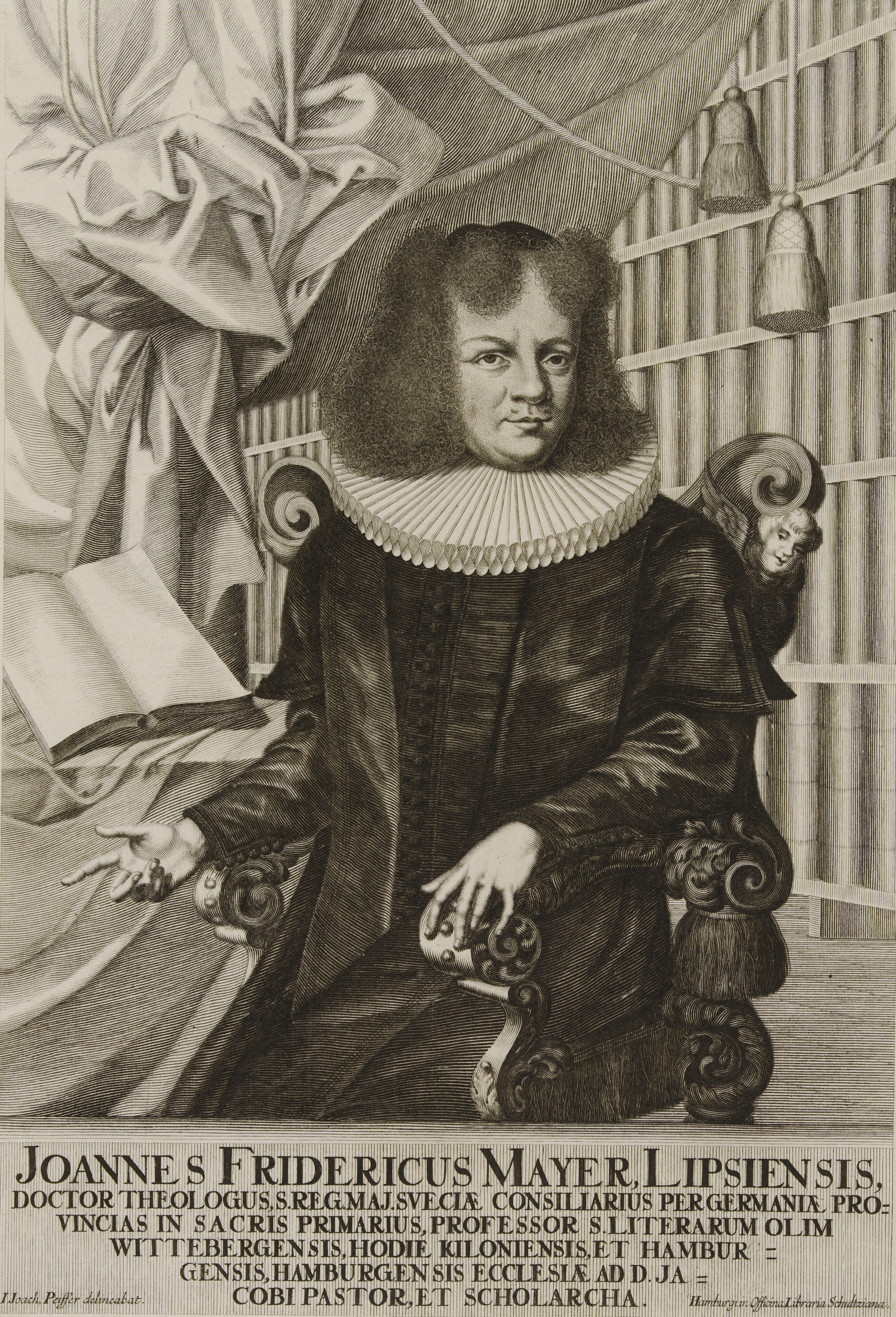
- Born: 6 December 1650; Leipzig
- Died: 30 March 1712 (aged 61); Stettin
- Movement: Lutheran Orthodoxy
- Spouse: Catharina Sabina Welsch
- Children: Johann Abraham Mayer

Johann Friedrich Mayer (6 December 1650 – 30 March 1712) was a German Lutheran theologian and professor of theology at Wittenberg University. He was an important champion of Lutheran orthodoxy and General Superintendent of Swedish Pomerania.

== Life ==
Johann Friedrich Mayer was born in Leipzig on 6 December 1650 as the son of Johann Ulrich Mayer and his wife Ursula Sophia Braun. He attended the University of Leipzig and was awarded a bachelor's degree on 21 April 1666. A master's degree in liberal arts from the Faculty of Philosophy Faculty followed on 30 January 1668. He then attended the University of Strasbourg, where he applied himself to theological studies under Balthasar Friedrich Salzmann and Balthasar Bebel until 1670.

On 13 February 1671, he joined the Theological Faculty of Leipzig University. On 29 January 1672, he was made Saturday preacher (assistant pastor) in Leipzig, and later that year he was appointed superintendent in Leisnig. On 29 May 1673 he obtained his licentiate and on 19 October 1674 his doctorate in Theology. On 27 November 1678, he was appointed pastor and superintendent in Grimma.

However, he did not find the position in Grimma fulfilling and wished to pursue an academic career. During his work as pastor, Mayer had made a name for himself as a writer of pamphlets against Syncretists, Arminianists and Papists.

By decision of the Saxon High Consistory in Dresden, he was appointed fourth professor of theology at the University of Wittenberg on 12 May 1684, where he worked alongside Abraham Calovius, Johannes Andreas Quenstedt, and Johann Deutschmann. This post entailed serving as second preacher at the Wittenberg Castle Church and administering the state scholarships. In his inaugural address he argued, with reference to Philipp Spener's Pia desideria, that theology should pursue piety rather than engaging in speculation.

Mayer was rector of Wittenberg University in the winter semester of 1684. The scandal of the breakdown of his marriage, ending in divorce, which was rare at that time, impaired Mayer's effectiveness in Wittenberg, and he accepted the position of senior pastor of St. James' Church, Hamburg, though he would have preferred to remain in Wittenberg. Spener had admonished Mayer in connection with his marital problems and prevented him from obtaining positions that became available in Wittenberg, which led to a deep and lasting rift between Mayer and Spener. As a champion of Lutheran orthodoxy, Mayer later became one of Spener's most troublesome opponents.

In 1692–93 there was a serious controversy among the senior pastors in Hamburg concerning the admissibility of Pietist conventicles. Mayer vehemently rejected them, along with Pietism in general, while Johann Heinrich Horb, the senior pastor at St. Nicholas', approved them, supported by Abraham Hinckelmann, senior pastor at St. Catherine's, and Johann Winckler, senior pastor at St. Michael's. Mayer prevailed and Horb was removed from his post; after Mayer's departure, however, Winckler, who had formerly acted as mediator, became the senior minister in Hamburg.

During his time in Hamburg, Mayer conducted a lively correspondence with leading figures of his time. He was active at the Hamburg Academic Gymnasium, was briefly professor at the University of Kiel, and was made a Senior Church Councillor (Oberkirchenrat) of Holstein. In addition, in 1691 King Charles XI of Sweden made him Senior Church Councillor (Oberkirchenrat) of the German territory under Swedish rule. In 1698 he was Consistorial Councillor to Anna Dorothea, Abbess of Quedlinburg and was also involved in theological affairs in Berlin.

In Hamburg Mayer had advanced to the status of an important champion of Lutheran orthodoxy. Following the death of Konrad Tiburtius Rango, Charles XII of Sweden, on 11 May 1701, offered Mayer Rango's post of General Superintendent of Swedish Pomerania, a position which he took up on 12 August. By virtue of this office he was professor of the Theological Faculty of the University of Greifswald, pastor and senior city minister at the collegiate church of St. Nicholas, assistant chancellor of the university, and chairman of the Greifswald Consistory. Aided by his already voluminous library and art collection, Mayer developed extensive activity as an author in Greifswald.

Mayer played an active role in the organizational work at the university and was its rector in 1701 and 1705.

He concerned himself with the history of Pomerania and intended to establish a learned society. However, the events of the Great Northern War intervened. Despite his loyalty to his Swedish master, after the entry of the enemy army on 25 January 1712, he was supposed to hold a prayer service for Peter the Great and Augustus II the Strong in St. Nicholas's church, where he was supposed to pray for the permanent expulsion of his Swedish employer. This caused him such agitation that he suffered a stroke. Because of this he resigned all his offices and went to Stettin, where he died of a further stroke.

On 29 May 1673 J. F. Mayer married Catharina Sabina Welsch, the daughter of Gottfried Welsch, a Leipzig Professor of Medicine. His son Johann Abraham Mayer later became a Professor of Medicine in Greifswald. The marriage was dissolved in 1686.

Johann Friedrich Mayer died 30 March 1712 in Stettin.

== Importance ==
As a strictly orthodox Lutheran, Mayer brooked no deviations from prescribed beliefs and, even during this period of late Orthodoxy, insisted on the sole validity of Lutheran orthodoxy. He did not realize that this obduracy deprived orthodoxy of its legitimation. It was this rigid attitude that enabled the currents of Rationalism and early Enlightenment to develop, which could not have been his intention.

== Book and Art Collections ==
Mayer built up a large book and art collection. He had one of the largest private libraries of the early 18th century. His art collection included a synagogue scene, a large collection of medals and a large number of pictures, including Cranach's portraits of the Protestant Reformers of Wittenberg. In 1694, Mayer was given an eight-voice residence organ by the organ builder Arp Schnitger, and he took this with him when he moved to Greifswald. After his death, his library was sold at auction. Most of the pictures remained in the family's possession until they were auctioned at the end of the 18th century. A copy of a Rubens painting from Mayer's collection now hangs in the church of Neuenkirchen. In 1742, the organ was installed in the Gutskapelle Deyersdorf; the box and two original registers by Arp Schnitger are still intact.

== Writings ==
=== Independent works (selection) ===
Mayer had 281 printed works published, so only a selection is given here.

- Museum ministri ecclesiae
- L. de electione Pontificis Rom. Hamburg, 1700
- Historia versionis Germanicae Bibiorum Lutheri
- Historia synodorum Gryphiswaldensium
- De side Baronii & Bellarmini ipsis Pontificiis ambigua
- Ecclesia Papaia Luterane patrona & cliens
- Biblotheca Biblica, Greifswald, 1702
- Chrysostomus Lutheranus, Wittenberg, 1686
- Ves und wiedergefundenes Kind Gottes
- Hamburgischer Sabbath
- Hamburgisches Ninive
- Biblotheca scriptorum Theologiae moralis, published with Strauchen's Theologiae morali, Greifswald, 1705
- Eclogae evangelicae
- Erste Früchte der Beredsamkeit
- Würdiger Communicant
- Warnung für einen falschen Eyd
- Betendes Kind Gottes
- Buß und Gebetsprüche
- Evangelischer Engel
- Wiederholung der heiligen Sabbathsarbeit
- Gottgeheiligte Früh-Stunden; 1706, Leipzig, published by Nicolaus Thürmann
- Lanx satura lucubrationum philologicarum, Strasbourg, 1669
- Bild Königs Karl XII, Greifswald, 1708

=== Letters ===
- Greifswaldisches Wochen-Blatt. 1744. (Copies of extracts from Mayer's correspondence)
- Handschriftliche Briefe Mayers an Johann Albrecht Fabricius. In: Staats- und Universitätsbibliothek Hamburg. Nachlass Reimarus M. 7-55.
- Handschriftliche Briefe Mayers an G. Spizel. In: Staatsbibliothek Augsburg.

=== Others ===
- Johann Carl Dähnert: "Pommersche Bibliothek". Vol. 2, Greifswald 1753, S. 405–424, 445–459, 525–535 Bd. 3, Greifswald 1754. pp. 41–58, 83–93.
- Kurt Detlev Möller: Johann Albrecht Fabricius 1668–1736. In: Zeitschrift des Vereins für Hamburgische Geschichte Jg. 36 (1937) pp. 1–64, here especially p. 43.

== Bibliography ==
- Hoffmann, Friedrich Lorenz (1870). Schröder, Hans (ed.). Lexikon der hamburgischen Schriftsteller bis zur Gegenwart [Lexicon of Hamburg writers to the present] (in German). Vol. 5. Hamburg. pp. 89–164.
- Krauter-Dierolf, Heike (2005). "Speners 'Erfordertes Bedencken' zum Hamburger Revers (1690) und die sich daran anschließende Auseinandersetzung mit Johann Friedrich Mayer in den Jahren 1691–1696". Die Eschatologie Philipp Jakob Speners: der Streit mit der lutherischen Orthodoxie um die 'Hoffnung besserer Zeiten' [The Eschatology of Philipp Jakob Spener: the dispute with Lutheran Orthodoxy over 'Hope of Better Times'] (in German). Mohr Siebeck. ISBN 9783161485770.
- Pyl, Theodor (1885). "Mayer, Johann Friedrich". Allgemeine Deutsche Biographie [General German Biography] (in German). Vol. 21. Leipzig: Duncker & Humblot. pp. 99–108.
- Zedler, Johann Heinrich (1739). "Mayer, Johann Friedrich". Grosses vollständiges Universal-Lexicon Aller Wissenschafften und Künste (in German). Vol. 19. Leipzig. columns 2336–2341.

The following are cited indirectly via the German Wikipedia article (q.v.). The translator of the English article may not have seen the original sources:

- Alvermann, Dirk; Dahlenburg, Birgit (2006). Greifswalder Köpfe [Greifswald figures] (in German). Rostock: Hinstorff. pp. 136 f. ISBN 3356011391.
- Blaufuss, Dietrich (1994). "Der Theologe Johann Friedrich Mayer (1650–1712). Fromme Orthodoxie und Gelehrsamkeit im Luthertum" [The theologian Johann Friedrich Mayer (1650–1712). Pious orthodoxy and scholarship in Lutheranism]. In Kühlmann, Wilhelm; Langer, Horst (eds.). Pommern in der Frühen Neuzeit: Literatur und Kultur in Stadt und Region [Pommerania in the Early Modern Period: Literature and Culture in the Town and the Region] (in German). Tübingen. ISBN 9783484365193.
- Fischer, Ernst (1989). "Patrioten und Ketzermacher" [Patriots and Heretic Producers]. Festschrift Wolfgang Martens' [Festschrift for Wolfgang Martens] (in German). Tübingen. pp. 17–47.
- Geffcken, Johannes. "Johann Friedrich Mayer als Prediger" [Johann Friedrich Mayer as a Preacher]. Zeitschrift des Vereins für Hamburgische Geschichte (in German). Jg. 1 (1841): 567–588.
- Gummelt, Volker (1996). Johann Friedrich Mayer. Seine Auseinandersetzungen mit Philipp Jacob Spener und August Hermann Francke [Johann Friedrich Mayer. His disputes with Philipp Jacob Spener and August Hermann Francke] (Habilitation thesis) (in German). Greifswald.
- Gummelt, Volker (2012). "Eine wiederentdeckte Rubens-Kopie aus dem Nachlass des Generalsuperintendenten Johann Friedrich Mayer". Pommern. Zeitschrift für Kultur und Geschichte (in German) (2): 26–28. ISSN 0032-4167.
- Hoffmann, F. L. (1865). "Johann Friedrich Mayer". Serapaeum (in German) (26): 209–222.
- Hofmeister, Adolf (1931). "Eine Denkschrift Johann Friedrich Mayers" [A Denkschrift for Johann Friedrich Mayer]. Monatsblätter der Gesellschaft für Pommersche Geschichte und Altertumskunde (in German). 45: 157–161, 173–181.
- Krause, Friedehilde (1972). "Eine Buchauktion ... Das abenteuerliche Schicksal der Bibliothek von Johann Friedrich Mayer" [A Book Auction ... The fantastic fate of the library of Johann Friedrich Mayer]. Marginalien. Zeitschrift für Buchkunst u. Bibliographie (in German) (45, H. 1): 16–28.
- Krolzik, Udo (1993). "Mayer, Johann Friedrich". Biographisch-Bibliographisches Kirchenlexikon [Biographical-Bibliographical Church Lexicon] (in German). Vol. 5. Herzberg: Bautz. columns 1108–1114. ISBN 3883090433.
- Lother, Helmut (1925). Pietist. Streitigkeiten in Greifswald [Pietist. Disputes in Greifswald] (in German). Gütersloh.
- Rüdiger, O. (1903). "Das Pfalzgrafendiplom für Johann Friedrich Mayer". Mitteilungen des Vereins für hamburgische Geschichte (in German). 7: 339–346.
- Rückleben, Hermann (1970). Die Niederwerfung der hamburgischen Ratsgewalt (in German). Hamburg.
- Steiger, Johann Anselm (2005). 500 Jahre Theologie in Hamburg: Hamburg als Zentrum christlicher Theologie [500 Years of Theology in Hamburg: Hamburg as a Centre of Christian Theology] (in German). Walter de Gruyter. ISBN 3110185296.
- von Busch, Jan (2014). "Arp Schnitgers Hausorgel für Dr. Johann Friedrich Mayer". Ars Organi (3): 141–147. ISSN 0004-2919.
- Walch, Johann Georg (1985) [reprint; originally published in 1733 (Part 3) and 1739 (Part 5)]. Historische und theologische Einleitung in die Religions-Streitigkeiten der evangelisch-lutherischen Kirche: von der Reformation bis auf jetzige Zeiten (in German). (orig. Jena) Stuttgart.
