= Balthasar Cellarius =

German theologian (1614–1689)

Lothar Berthold
- Born: 10 October 1640; Rottleben, Duchy of Brunswick-Lüneburg
- Died: 15 September 1689 (aged 48); Helmstedt, Duchy of Brunswick-Lüneburg
- Education: Jena
- Occupations: theologian university teacher
- Spouse: Elisabeth Gesenius
- Children: Justus Cellarius

Balthasar Cellarius (10 October 1614 - 15 September 1689) as a German Lutheran theologian and preacher. He wrote prolifically. In 1642 he moved to the University of Helmstedt where became a professor in New Testament studies.

== Life ==
The son of a rural pastor, Balthasar Cellarius was born in Rottleben, a village in the hills west of Leipzig and north of Erfurt. He grew up in modest circumstances, obtaining his schooling atfrom the Gymnasium in Gera. In 1632 he moved on to Jena where he studied Theology, emerging in 1638 with a Magister ("Masters") degree. Between 1637 and 1641 he supported himself as a teacher and author. He spent around a year working in Wittenberg during 1641/42 and then went to Rudolstadt near Jena, where he was employed as a "mentor" by Friedrich Hofer von Uhrfahren, a leading citizen of the town.

In 1642 he joined the University of Helmstedt, where he became a lecturer. Here he met Georg Calixtus, later described as his tutor, and Konrad Hornejus. The three began to exchange ideas. After two years, on 5 July 1644, apparently at the instigation of Georg Calixtus, Cellarius was summoned to move to Braunschweig to become a preacher at the St.-Ulrici church. Two years later he was called back to Helmstedt to take up the office of General Superintendent, and the associated Theology professorship. A senior colleague, Justus Gesenius, objected to the appointment, believing that Cellarius had yet to pass all the necessary examinations. In the event the appointment was deferred for two years, but went ahead in 1648. An intriguing further detail is that around this time Balthasar Cellarius married Elisabeth, one of the daughters of Justus Gesenius. Justus Cellarius, the couple's son, was born towards the end of 1649.

Cellarius now took on a second professorship at Helmstedt, and gave lectures on the New Testament, focusing on the Pericopes. He also joined in the polemics against the Roman Church. In 1650 the University of Helmstedt received a visitation in the course of which doctorates were conferred on Balthasar Cellarius, along with Gerhard Titius. At the same time he was appointed Abbot of the monastery at Marienthal. He managed largely to steer clear of the Syncretistic controversy with the so-called Orthodox Luterhans.

On 10 April 1656 Cellarius delivered the funeral oration for his old teacher, the controversialist Georg Calixtus. Cellarius himself died on 15 September 1689.

== Output (selection) ==
- Examen potiorum controversiarium, quae ecclesiis A. Confessioni addictis cum Pontificiis intercedunt 1657
- Theologia naturalis
- Tabulae ethicae, politicae et physicae
- De constitutione, natura et paribus theologiae 1651
