= Johann Hülsemann =

German Lutheran theologian (1602–1661)

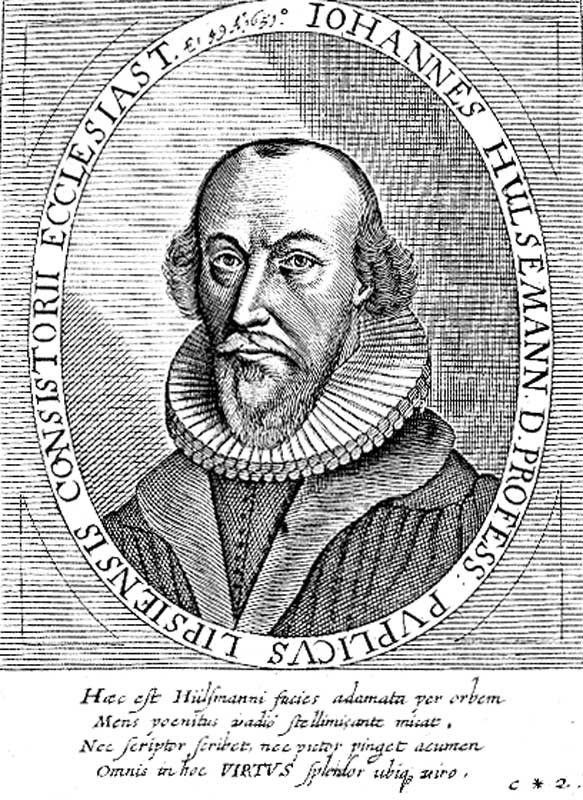
Johann Hülsemann

Johann Hülsemann (4 December 1602 – 13 June 1661) was a German Lutheran theologian. He is known as one of the most prominent Lutheran scholastic opponents of Georgius Calixtus in the Syncretistic Controversy.

== Biography ==
=== Early life and education ===
Hülsemann was born at Esens, 65 miles n.w. of Bremen in East Frisia, 4 December 1602. He was educated at Norden, Stade, and Hanover. Before he had reached the age of eighteen, he went to the University of Rostock, and two years later to Wittenberg. He also studied briefly at Marburg.

=== Career ===
In 1627 he removed to Leipzig, where he was permitted to lecture. In 1629 he was appointed professor at Wittenberg, where he achieved an authoritative position. In 1630 he was sent to Leipzig as a delegate to a convention in behalf of the Augsburg Confession, and in 1645 he took a leading position at the colloquy of Thorn. In 1646 he became professor of systemic theology at Leipzig. During that time he also served as pastor of St. Nicholas Church and as superintendent from 1657.

He wrote Calvinisimus irreconciliabilis (Wittenberg 1644) as the counterpart to Bishop Joseph Hall's Roma irreconciliabilis, adding an appendix Quae dogmata sint ad salutem creditu necessaria, which is somewhat conciliatory towards the Reformed doctrine of the Lord’s Supper and the personal union. In his later years he denied his appendix and asked for it to be considered an immature writing of his youth.

Though Hülsemann had been friends with Calixtus before Thorn, he became his declared opponent. In the years following Thorn, he became one of the most prominent adversaries of Calixtus, and though Abraham Calovius is more remembered today, many of his contemporaries considered him the leader of German Lutheranism. According to Ingetraut Ludolphy, he was a born systematician, whose attacks on Calixtus and the other Helmstedt theologians are far superior to most other anti-Helmstedt polemics.

=== Death and afterward ===
Hülsemann died at Leipzig, June 13, 1661.

== Works ==
Huelsemann’s principal works are his Brevarium theologiae (Wittenberg, 1640 which was enlarged with the title, Extensio brevarii theologiae, Leipzig, 1655). He also wrote Muster und Ausbund gutter Werke (1650); Dialysis apologetica problematic Calixtini (1651); and Der Calixtuinische Gewissenswurm (1653).

== Family ==
The theologian Abraham Calovius was his son-in-law.
