= Johann Friedrich Mayer =

Johann Friedrich Mayer may refer to:

- Johann Friedrich Mayer (theologian) (1650–1712), German theologian
- Johann Friedrich Mayer (agriculturist) (1719–1798), German agriculturist
