= Aegidius Strauch II =

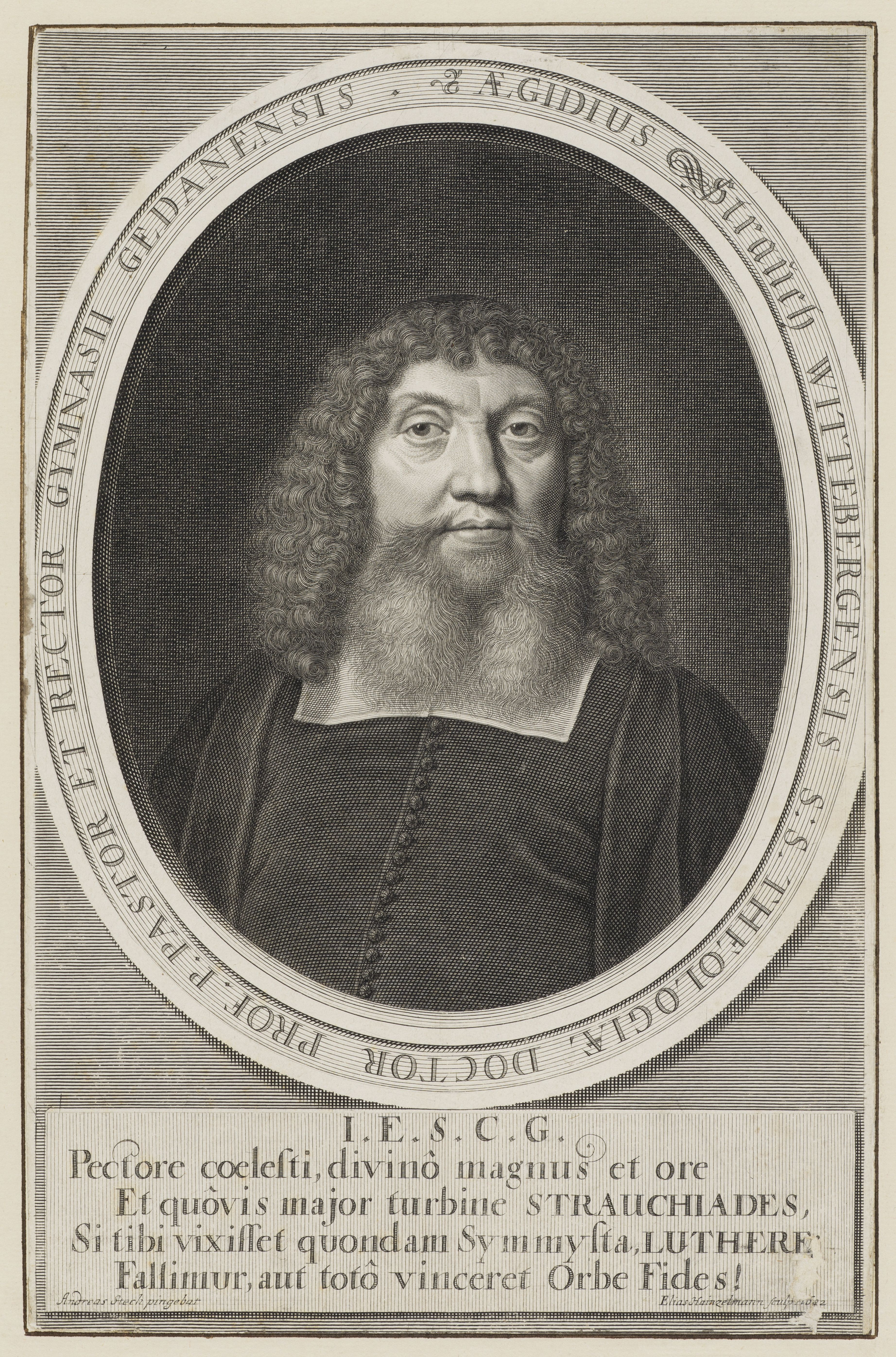
Aegidius Strauch (1682)

Aegidius Strauch (21 February 1632 – 13 December 1682) was a German mathematician and theologian.

== Life ==
Aegidius Strauch was born in Wittenberg, the son of the Electoral Councillor Johann Strauch. As early as 1646 he attended lectures at Wittenberg University and studied in the fields of history, mathematics and oriental languages. In 1649 he moved to the University of Leipzig, where he continued his language studies and devoted himself to the study of theology. In 1650 he returned to Wittenberg, and on 29 April 1651, became a Doctor of Philosophy. He was appointed adjunct professor of the Faculty of Philosophy on October 18, 1653, and, in 1656, professor of Mathematics as substitute of Reinhold Frankenberger. He became a theological licentiate in 1657, and a Doctor of Theology on October 13, 1662.

On 9 February 1658, Strauch married Martha Magarethe Sibylle Cranach (born 29 September 1634 in Wachsdorf).

In 1664 he published the Breviarium Chronologicum with the subtitle Being a treatise describing the terms and most celebrated characters, periods and epocha's us'd in chronology, by which that useful science may easily be attained to. In this book, he used mathematics and chronology to assign exact dates and times to major historical events, from the beginning of the world until the split of the Roman Empire in 285. This includes events in the Bible, such as the Exodus.

After Frankenberger's death, he took over as professor in 1664 as substitute for his brother Michael Strauch, who had held the post since 1565. Strauch took over the professorship for history and was subsequently able to devote himself to theological studies. In 1666 he was appointed as assessor of the theological faculty at Wittenberg University.

Because of the disputes with Friedrich Ulrich Calixt, (son of George Calixt) he followed a call as pastor of the Trinity Church and rector of the Gymnasium in Gdańsk.

He was a polemicist against Calvinists, syncretists, and papists and criticized them from the pulpit and in writings. When, in 1673, he did not comply with the Council's attempts to reach an agreement, he was dismissed on 28 December 1673. However, he had gained respect for the common people who forced the Council of Danzig to reinstate him on 4 January 1674.

When he went to Greifswald in 1675, he was imprisoned in Küstrin. It was only when the Electorate of Saxony and the King of Poland asked the Elector of Brandenburg for his release, that he was released on 9 July 1678. Strauch returned to Gdansk after his release on July 20, 1678, and was reinstated by the Gdansk Council on September 8, 1678. Eventually the disputes with the Danzig clergy were settled.

Strauch died on 13 December 1682 in Gdańsk.

== Works ==
- Breviarium chronologicum (in Latin). Wittenberg: Joannis Haken. 1657.
- De computo Gregoriano (in Latin). Wittenberg: Michael Wendt. 1660.
- Dissertatio de Anno Ebroeorum Ecclesiastico (Wittenberg, 1661)
- Dissertatio de Computo Talmudico-Rabbinico (Wittenberg, 1661)
- Dissertatio de Computo Julio-Constantineano (Wittenberg, 1662)
- Tabulae per universam mathesin summopere necessariae (in Latin). Wittenberg: Johann Röhner. 1662.
- De Poenitentia Ninevitarum (Wittenberg, 1664)

== See also ==
Syncretistic Controversy
