= Alvermann =

Alvermann is a surname. Notable people with the surname include:

- Dirk Alvermann (1965–2023), German archivist and historian
- Donna Alvermann, American educator and researcher
- Gustav Alvermann (1897–1942), German World War II military officer
