= Botanical Museum Greifswald =

Museum in Greifswald

Coordinates: 54.0947°N 13.3665°E

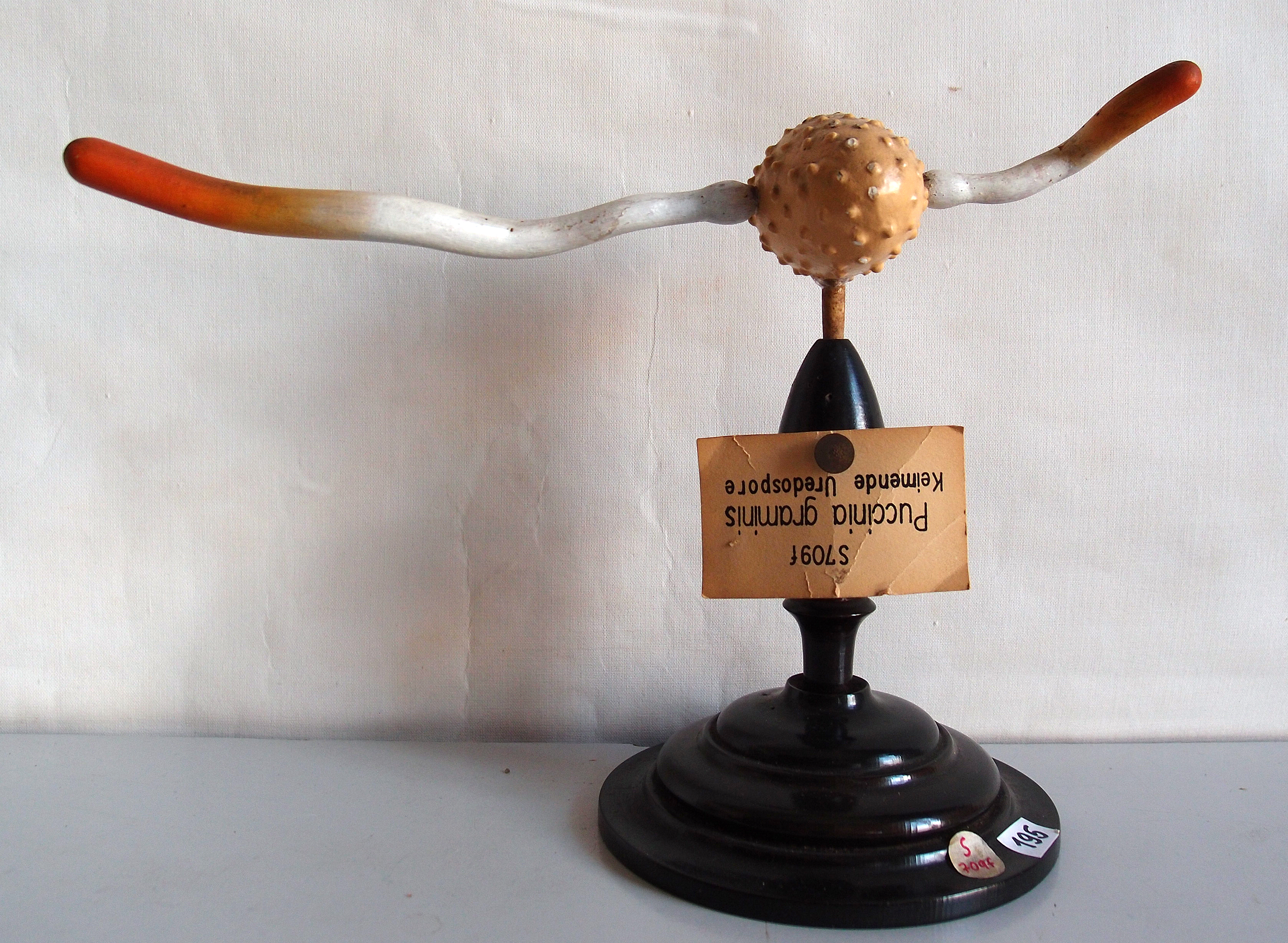
A model from the teaching collection, Puccinia graminis

Botanical Museum Greifswald

The Botanical Museum Greifswald (German: Botanisches Museum Greifswald) is a scientific collection at the department of botany of the University of Greifswald. It was founded around 1850 by Julius Münter and is the largest botanical collection in the state of Mecklenburg-Vorpommern.

== History ==
A herbarium was created in the 17th century when Samuel Gustav Wilcke founded the Botanical Gardens of Greifswald. The Botanical museum was founded by Julius Münter between 1845 and 1855. Münter and his assistants Hermann Zabel and Ludwig Holtz collected botanical objects from the region of New Western Pomerania. The collections were later extended to specimens from other regions.

== Holdings ==
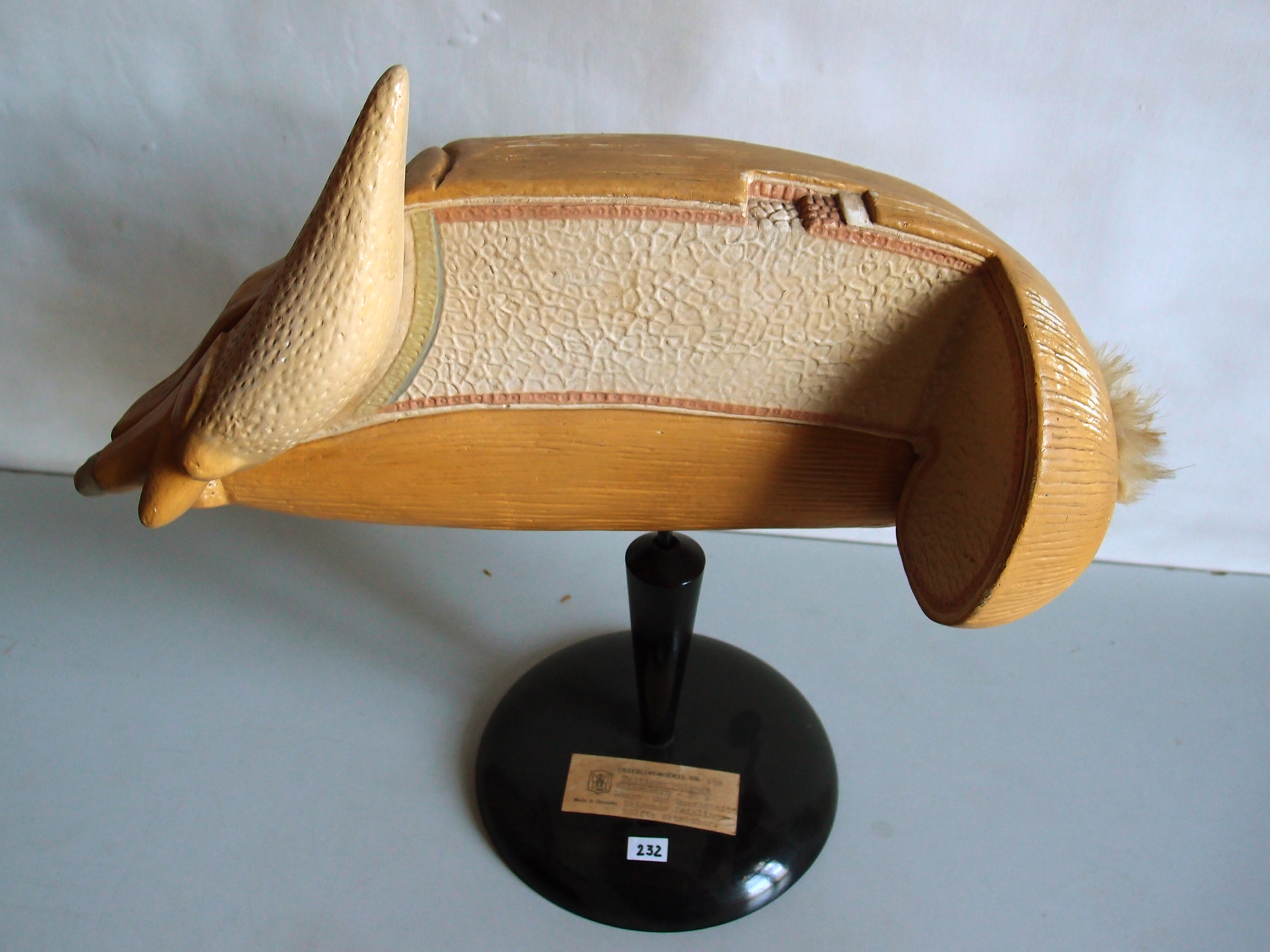
Model of a wheat grain

The collection includes naturalia such as wood samples, plant compounds, and drugs as well as artificialia such as scientific models, instruments, and wall charts. The core of the collection consists of the herbarium with roughly 300.000 specimens and the teaching collection with many botanical models.

The “Herbarium Higher Plants” (GFV) documents many endangered or extinct species and serves as the central herbarium of the state of Mecklenburg-Vorpommern. The holdings include 250.000 specimens of ferns and spermatophytes, 30.000 algae, 17.000 moss, and 8.000 lichens. The teaching collection contains flower models of the model makers Robert Brendel and Paul Osterloh, as well as the "Arnoldsche Obst-Cabinet" (Arnold’s fruit cabinet) with 214 (originally 455) models of fruits. The porcelain models were produced between 1856 and 1899 in Gotha.

== Sources ==
- Birgit Dahlenburg (edit.): Wissen sammeln. Die digitalisierten Schätze der Universität Greifswald. Sammlungsobjekte der Botanik, Zoologie sowie Ur- und Frühgeschichte Greifswald 2011
- Birgit Litterski: Sammlungen des Botanischen Institutsin: Kulturbesitz und Sammlungen der Ernst-Moritz-Arndt-Universität Greifswald. Hrsg. von Ernst-Moritz-Arndt-Universität Greifswald, Rostock 1995, p. 81-82
- Susanne Starke & Martin Schnittler (2009): Die Sammlungen des Botanischen Institutes der Ernst-Moritz- Arndt-Universität Greifswald. In: Obst, K., Reinicke, G.-B., Richter, S. & Seemann, R. [edit.] Schatzkammern der Natur – Naturkundliche Sammlungen in Mecklenburg-Vorpommern. – 100 pages, ISBN 978-3-00-025888-6.
