= Karl Friedrich Walch =

German legal scholar

Karl Friedrich Walch (1734 – 20 July 1799) was a German legal scholar.

== Biography ==
Walch was a son of German theologian Johann Georg Walch. He devoted himself to the study of law, and became professor of law at the University of Jena in 1759. His most important works were Introductio in controversias juris civilis recentioris (Jena, 1771) and Geschichte der in Deutschland geltenden Rechte (Jena, 1780). He also wrote Das Näherrecht.

== See also ==
- Johann Franz Buddeus, grandfather
- Johann Georg Walch, father
- Johann Ernst Immanuel Walch, brother
- Christian Wilhelm Franz Walch, brother
