= Johannes Musaeus =

German Protestant theologian

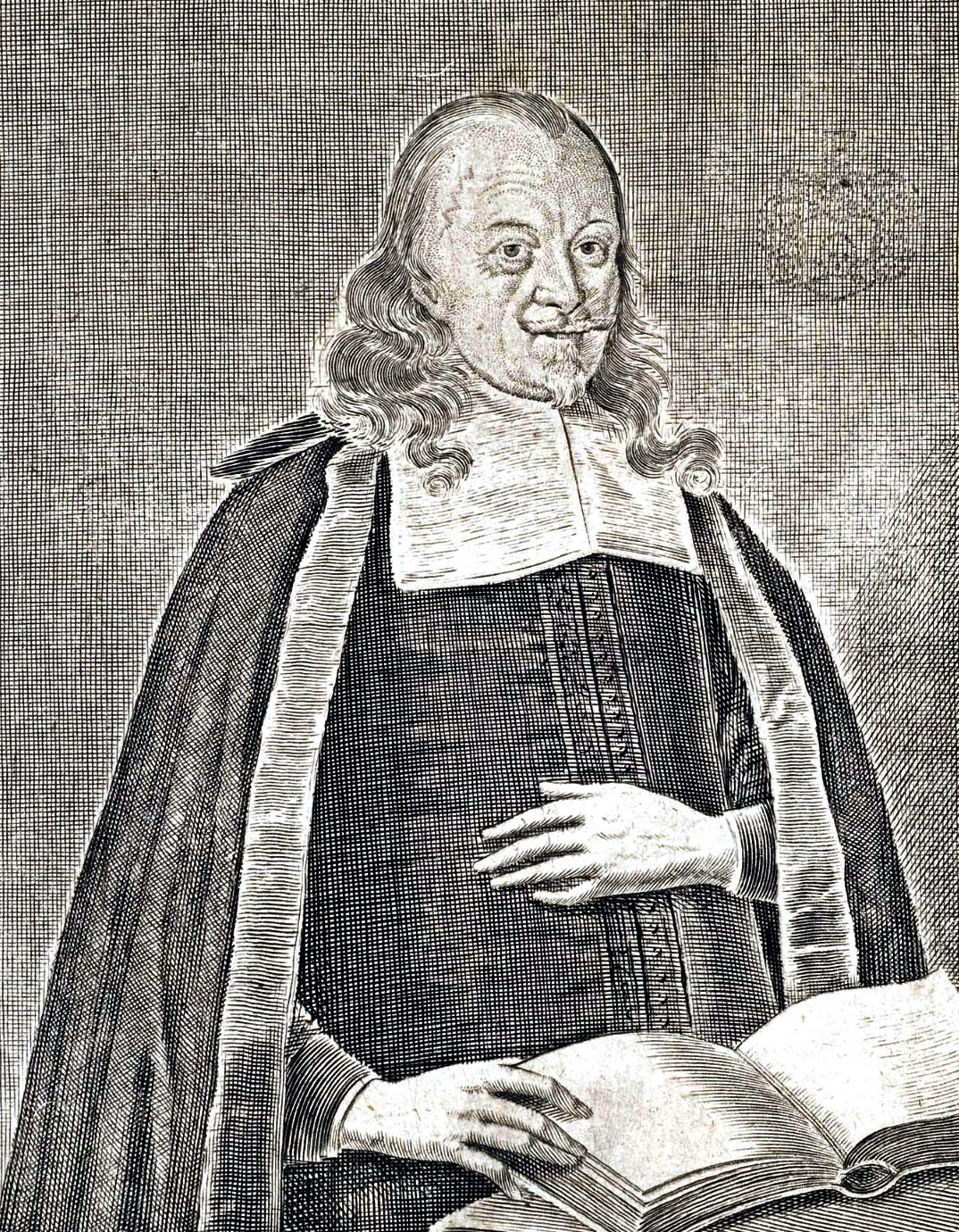
- Born: 7 February 1613; Langewiesen, Schwarzburg-Sondershausen
- Died: 4 May 1681 (aged 68); Jena, Saxe-Jena
- Education: University of Erfurt
- Scientific career
- Fields: Theologian and natural philosopher
- Workplaces: University of Jena
- Doctoral advisor: Georg Grosshain
- Doctoral students: Johann Georg Macasius

Notes
- He was the brother of Peter Musaeus.

Johannes Musaeus (7 February 1613 – 4 May 1681) was a German Protestant theologian.

== Education ==
After visiting the Latin school in Arnstadt he studied at the University of Erfurt starting from 1633 in the Arts Faculty and in Jena with Damiel Stahl. In 1634 he received the Magister Artium, studying theology under Georg Grosshain, producing a thesis entitled: Disputatio Apologetica In qua Germanica B. Lutheri versio adversus Georgium Holzaium Jesuitam Ingolstad. defenditur In causa De Cultu Divino Enoschi. In 1643 he became professor of history and poetry. He obtained a doctorate to 1646 in theology and changed to the Theological Faculty.

== Career ==
He fought against the catholic controversial theologians V. Erbermann, J. Kedde, and Jacobus Masenius, and positioned himself against Socinianism. He was founder of the Jenenser Richtung followed by orthodox Lutherans.

== Family ==
His daughter Anna Catharina Musäus married his student Johann Wilhelm Baier. Through this marriage, Musäus was the grandfather of physician Johann Jacob Baier, and theologians Johann David Baier and Johann Wilhelm Baier Junior.

== Books by Musaeus ==
- Disquisitio philologica de stylo Novi Testamenti, 1641, Jena
- De usu principiorum rationis et philosophiae in controversiis theologicis libri III, 1644, Jena
- Disputatio de aeterno dei decreto an absolutum sit, 1646, Jena
- Verteidigung des unbeweglichen Grundes, dessen der Augsburgischen Confession verwandte Lehrer zum Beweis ihrer Kirchen sich gebrauchen, 1654, Jena
- Tractatus theologicus de conversione hominis peccatoris ad Deum, 1661, Jena
- Biblia Lutheri auspiciis Ernesti Ducis. .. glossis ac interpretationibus illustrata, a Viti Erbermanni iterata maledicentia vindicata, 1663, Jena

== See also ==
- Syncretistic controversy
- Georg Calixt
- Abraham Calov
