= Johann Georg Walch =

German Lutheran theologian (1693-1775)

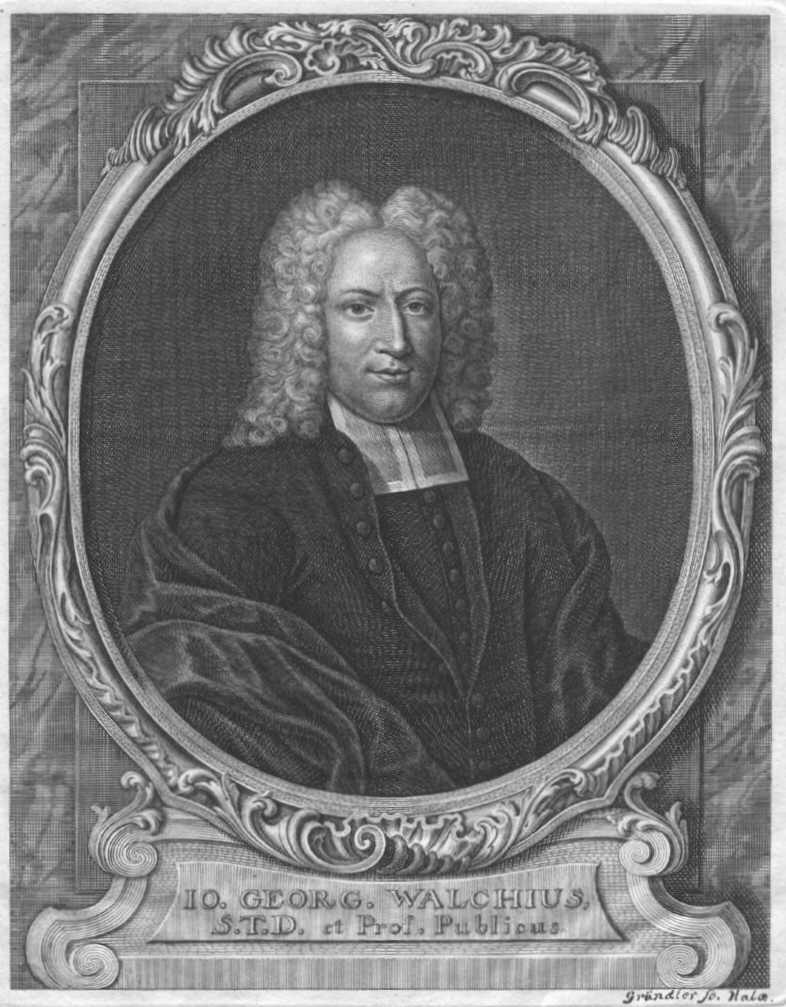
- Born: 17 June 1693; Meiningen, Germany
- Died: 13 January 1775 (aged 81); Jena, Germany
- Education: Leipzig University
- Children: Christian Wilhelm Franz Walch; Johann Ernst Immanuel Walch
- Theological work
- Language: German

Johann Georg Walch (17 June 1693 – 13 January 1775) was a German Lutheran theologian.

== Life ==
He was born in Meiningen, where his father, Georg Walch, was general superintendent. He studied at Leipzig and Jena, amongst his teachers being J. F. Buddeus, whose only daughter he married. He published in 1716 a work, Historia critica Latinae linguae, which soon came into wide use. Two years later he became professor extraordinarius of philosophy at Jena. In 1719, he was appointed professor ordinarius of rhetoric, in 1721 of poetry, and in 1724 professor extraordinarius of theology. In 1728 he became professor ordinarius of theology, and in 1730 professor primarius.

Johann Georg Walch died in Jena on 13 January 1775.

His theological position was that of moderate orthodoxy, greatly influenced by the philosophy and controversies of the Deistic period. His university lectures and published works ranged over the wide fields of church history in its various branches, particularly the literature and the controversies of the church, dogmatics, ethics and pastoral theology.

== Writings ==
Of his works the most valuable were Bibliotheca theologica (1757–1765); Bibliotheca patristica (1770); his edition of Luther's works in 24 vols. (1740–1752); Historische und theologische Einleitung in die religiösen Streitigkeiten, welche sonderlich ausser der evangelische-lutherischen Kirche entstanden (5 vols., 1733 ff.); the companion work to this, Einleitung in die Religionsstreitigkeiten der evangel.-luth. Kirche (1730–1739), and Philosophisches Lexikon (1726, 4th ed. 1775).

Also important is the Historia logicae, published in Leipzig in 1721.

His life, with a complete list of his writings, which amounted to 287, Leben und Charakter des Kirchenraths J. G. Walch, was published anonymously by his son CWF Walch (Jena, 1777). Cf. Wilhelm Gass, Protestantische Dogmatik, iii. p. 205 sq.

=== Publications ===
His publications include;

- Philosophical Lexicon (1726)
- Historische und theologische Einleitung in die vornehmsten Religions-Streitigkeiten (1728)
- Historia transsubstantionis Pontificiae (1738)
- Works of Luther (1740-1751)
- Dissertatio qua historiam doctrinae de peccato originis ... (1738)
- Introduction to the Theological Sciences (1747)
- Bibliotheca patristica (1770)

== Family ==
He was married to Charlotte Katharina Buddeus.

His sons, Johann Ernst Immanuel and Christian Wilhelm Franz Walch were also noted theologians. His son Karl Friedrich Walch became a law professor.
