= Christian Wilhelm Franz Walch =

German theologian

Christian Wilhelm Franz Walch (25 December 1726 – 10 March 1784) was a Protestant German theologian and professor of theology from Göttingen. He authored numerous books.

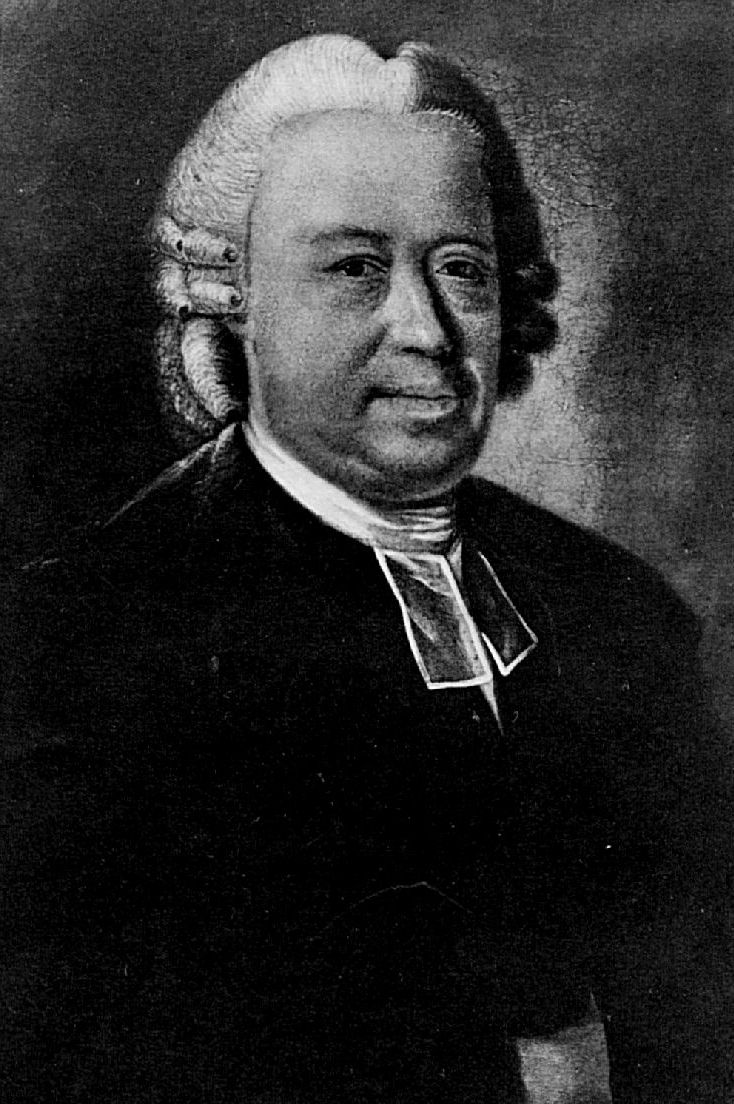
Christian Wilhelm Franz Walch (1726–1784)

== Life ==
Walch was born on 25 December 1726 in Meiningen. His father Johann Georg Walch (1693–1775) was a theologian who took the theological position of moderate Lutheran orthodoxy. His older brother was Johann Ernst Immanuel Walch. In 1763 he married Eleonore Friderike Crome. Walch died on 10 March 1784 in Göttingen.

He studied theology, philosophy and oriental languages at the University of Jena. In 1745, he received MA degree of Philosophy. Here in the same year he became doctor of Theology and three years later Professor of Theology. He was interested in dogmatic theology, morality, exegesis, church history, history Christian of literature, and the canon law. He travelled with his brother to Netherlands, France, Italy, and Switzerland, making the acquaintance of the learned men of each country.

In 1750 he started work at the University of Jena as professor of philosophy. In 1754, he started work at the University of Göttingen. The history of theology was the field of his special interest.

In 1760 he was promoted in the university administration as Curator Aerariorum piorum, in 1765 and in 1784 he became manager of the "Repetentenkollegs". At the end of 1766, he became the first professor of the theological faculty and in the Society of the sciences, philological-historical class, in Göttingen. In 1780, he was a manager of the society of the sciences in Göttingen.

His main work was Entwurf einer vollständigen Historie der Ketzereien (11 volumes, 1762–85), in which he described the history of the church from the apostolic age until the Reformation. In this work he defined a heresy on the one hand as a branch of Christianity and on the other as one in fundamental error. He claimed for the heretics a place in the church. This monumental work is still reprinted until the present day. One of the last edition of this work was published in 2002 by Adamant Media Corporation.

== Works ==
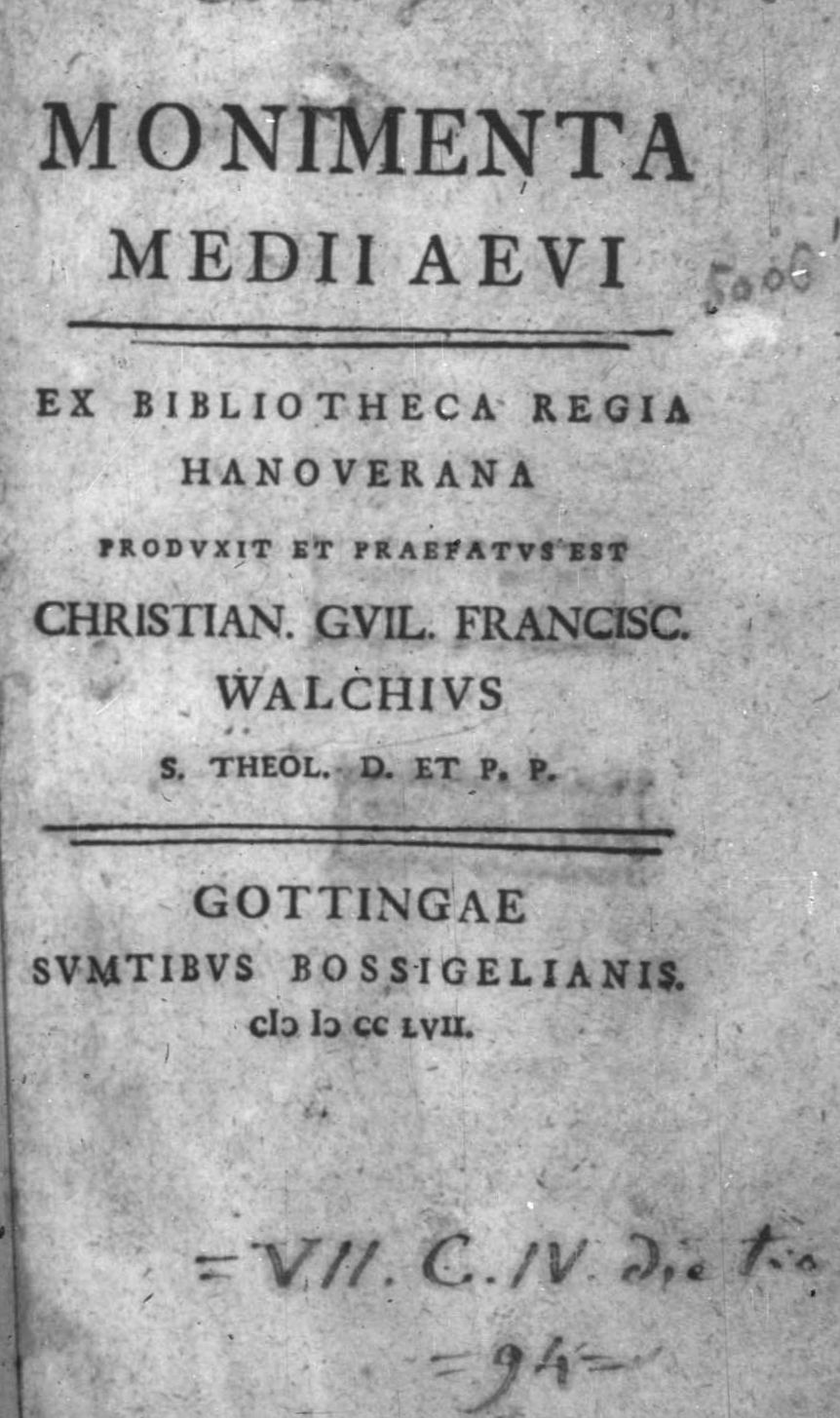
Monimenta Medii Aevi ex Bibliotheca regia Hanoverana, 1757

- Epistola de pallio philosophico veterum Christianorum, 1744;
- Antiquitates pallii philosophici veterum Christianorum, 1745;
- De Deo Ebraeorum montano, 1747;
- De Ottone Magno, Italiae rege ac Romanorum imperatore, 1747;
- De Felice, Judaeae procuratore, 1747;
- De pietate Ludovici Pii, Imperatoris Augusti, 1748;
- Censura diloatica, quod Ludovicus Pius Imperator Aug. Paschali I., Pontifici Romano, concessisse fertur, summo viro, Ludovico Ant. Muratorio inscripta, et celeberrimo Patavinorum historico, Antonio Sandino, opposita, 1749;
- Entwurf der Staatsverfassung der vornehmsten Reiche und Völker in Europa, 1749;
- De Missis dominicis, Pontificis Romani iudicibus, 1749;
- De Eruditione Laicorum medii aevi, 1750;
- Historis canonisationis Caroli Magni, variis observationibus illustrata, 1750;
- Christus solus ex virgine natus, 1750;
- Wahrhaftige Geschichte der seligen Frau Catharina von Bora, D. Martini Luther's Ehegattin, wider Eusebii Engelhardi Morgenstern zu Witenberg, 1751 (1752^{2}; 2. Teil 1754);
- De Chlodovaeo Magno ex rationibus politicis Christiano, 1751;
- De unctionibus veterum Hebraeorum convivalibus, 1751;
- Historia Patriarcharum Judaeorum, quorum in libris iuris Judaeorum sit mentio, 1752;
- Oratio de eloquentia Latina veterum Germanorum, 1752;
- Maria virgo non monialis, 1752;
- Teutsche Reichshistorie, 1753;
- Geschichte der Evangelisch-Lutherischen Religion, als ein Beweis, daß sie die wahre sey, 1753;
- Commentatio de senatore Romano medii aevi, fratri optimo, Car. Frid. Walchio Walchio, gratulationis caussa consecrata, 1753;
- Comentatio de litteris Electorum consensionis testibus, 1754;
- Oratio de Georgia Augusta, providentiae divinae testi, 1754;
- Oratio de Georgia Augusta, providentiae testi, 1754;
- De Bonoso haereticos, 1754;
- Commentatio de Luthero disputatore, 1754;
- De obedientia Christi activa, 1754;
- Historia Adoptianorum, 1755;
- De testimonio Christi de se ipso, 1755;
- De testimonio Christi de se ipso, 1755;
- De liberis S. R. I. civitatibus, a pace religiosa nunquam exclusiis, 1755;
- Caroli Magni de gratia septiformis spiritus disputatio, 1755;
- Entwurf einer vollständigen Historie der Römischen Päpste, 1756 (London 1759);
- Gedanken von der Geschichte der Glaubenslehren, 1756 (1764^{2});
- De consensu Christi et Pauli, a Criminatione Henrici Vicecomitis Bolingbrokii vindicatio, 1756;
- De Vigilantio, haeretico orthodoxo, 1756;
- Programma quo expenditur veterum sententia de conceptione Christi per auditum, 1756;
- Compendium historiae ecclesiasticae recentissimae, ut Compendio historiae ecclesiasticae Gothano supplemento sit, adornatum, 1757;
- Theologia dogmatica epitome, tabulis analyticis expressa, 1757;
- Monumenta medii aevi, ex Bibliotheca regia Hanoverana, Vol. I-II, 1757–1764;
  - Monimenta Medii Aevi ex Bibliotheca regia Hanoverana (in Latin). Vol. 1. Göttingen: Victor Bossigel. 1757.
  - Monimenta Medii Aevi ex Bibliotheca regia Hanoverana (in Latin). Vol. 2. Göttingen: Victor Bossigel. 1758.
  - Monimenta Medii Aevi ex Bibliotheca regia Hanoverana (in Latin). Vol. 3. Göttingen: Victor Bossigel. 1759.
  - Monimenta Medii Aevi ex Bibliotheca regia Hanoverana (in Latin). Vol. 4. Göttingen: Victor Bossigel. 1760.
- Observationes de Christo Papa, 1757;
- Theologia moralis epitome, tabulis synopticis expressa, 1758;
- De pompis Satanae, 1758;
- De illuminatione Apostolorum successiva, 1758;
- De verbia Christi redivivi: Pax vobis, 1758;
- Historia controversiae saeculi XI de partu beatae virginis, 1758;
- Entwurf einer vollständigen Historie der Kirchenversammlungen, 1759;
- De resurrectione carnis, adversus Arthur Ashley Sykesium, 1759;
- Observationes de nomine servi Dei in monumentis Christianis, 1759;
- De Consensu virtutis moralis et politicae, maxime contra Helvetium, 1759;
- Grundsätze der natürlichen Gottesgelahrtheit, 1760 (1779^{2});
- Epitome Theologiae polemicae, tabulis analyticis expressa, 1760;
- Historia Protopaschitarum, 1760;
- Grundsätze der Kirchengeschichte des Neuen Testaments, 1761 (1773^{2}; 1792^{3} by J. Chr. F. Schulz);
- Observationes ecclesiasticae de traditione Spiritus Sancti, 1761;
- Entwurf einer vollständigen Historie der Ketzereyen, Spaltungen und Religionsstreitigkeiten bis auf die Zeiten der Reformation, 11 vols., 1762-1785 (Erster Theil, 1762, Zweiter Theil, 1764);
- Oratio solemnis, qua Regi suo augustissimo de victoriis natoque filio inter sacra sua anniversaria d. XI Oct. MDCCLXII devotissime gratulata est Academia Georgia Augusta, 1762;
- Programma quo illustratur, quae Angelus de nato soteri krito kyrio pastoribus nuntiavit, 1762;
- Oratio, cum Magistratum academicum deponeret, 1763;
- Interpretatio oraculi Domini de sua, vitam ponendi et resumendi, potestate, 1764;
- Breviarium Theologiae symbolicae Ecclesiae Lutheranae, 1765 (1781^{2});
- Auspicia regii Collegii theologici Repetentium in Academia Georgia Augusta, 1765;
- Nachricht von dem königlichen theologischen Repetentencollegio zu Göttingen, 1765;
- Programma quo illustratur particula Symboli Nicaeni-Constantinopolitani de Spiritu Sancto, qui locatus est per Prophetas, 1765;
- De lege Leviratus, ad fratres non germanos, sed tribules referenda, ad Deuteronomium XXV, 5, 1765;
- Admonitio de evitando abusu exegetico doctrinae de donis miraculosis, 1766;
- De Christo, filio Dei proprio, 1766);
- Oratio de felicitate vitae academicae, cum magistratum academicum susciperet, 1767;
- De culpa Adami nn felice, 1767;
- De cura veterum Christianorum, memoriam resurrectionis Christi conservandi propagandique, 1767;
- Patri summe venerando J. G. Walchio, pro quinquaginta annis muneris academici feliciter exactis d. IV Martii A. MDCCLXVIII, 1768;
- De successione ministrorum ecclesiae in iura Apostolorum caute definienda, 1768;
- Patrum sententiae de filio Dei per incarnationem exinanito enarratur et convellitur, 1769;
- Bibliotheca symbolica vetus ex monimentis quinque priorum saeculorum maxime selecta et observationibus historicis et criticis illustrata, 1770;
- De sanctitatis elogio, quod Spiritui Sancto tribui consuevit, 1770;
- De concordia rationis et fidei in describenda labe hominis naturali, 1770;
- Kritische Nachricht von den Quellen der Kirchenhistorie, 1770 (1773^{2} verb.);
- Neueste Religionsgeschichte, 9 vols., 1771–1783;
- De decretis, praedestinationis et reprobationis ex rationis iudicio non absolutis, sed hypotheticis, 1771;
- Num Ignatius Christum post resurrectionem in carne viderit?, 1772;
- Grundsätze der zur Kirchenhistorie des neuen Testaments nöthigen Vorbereitungslehren und Bücherkenntniss, 1773;
- De satisficatione pro omnium peccatis a Christo praestita, 1773;
- De uno, ex quo Christus et homines sunt omnes, 1774;
- Grundsätze der Kirchengeschichte des achtzehnten Jahrhunderts, 1774;
- Breviarium Theologiae dogmaticae, 1775;
- Doctrinae de futura mortuorum resurrectiones ad excitanda pietatis studia vis et usus, 1775;
- De intercessione Christi sacerdotali, 1775;
- De epistolis Patriarcharum Alexandrinorum paschalibus, 1776;
- De lege iusto non posita, 1776;
- Origenis de diebus Christianorum festis disputatio illustrata, 1777;
- Lebensbeschreibung D. Johannes Georg Walch's, 1777;
- Illustratio particulae symbolorum veterum de Christo ex maria nato, 1778;
- Kritische Untersuchung vom Gebrauch der heiligen Schrift unter den alten Christen in den ersten vier Jahrhunderten, 1779;
- Antiquitates symbolicae articuli de resurrectione Christi, 1780;
- Pseudoparakletos historia, 1781;
- Variarum de voce Joannis: Ecce agnus Dei, qui tollit peccatum mundi, recte explicanda sententiarum narratio critica, 1783.

== See also ==
- Johann Franz Buddeus, grandfather
- Karl Friedrich Walch, brother
