= Johann Ernst Immanuel Walch =

German theologian (1725–1778)

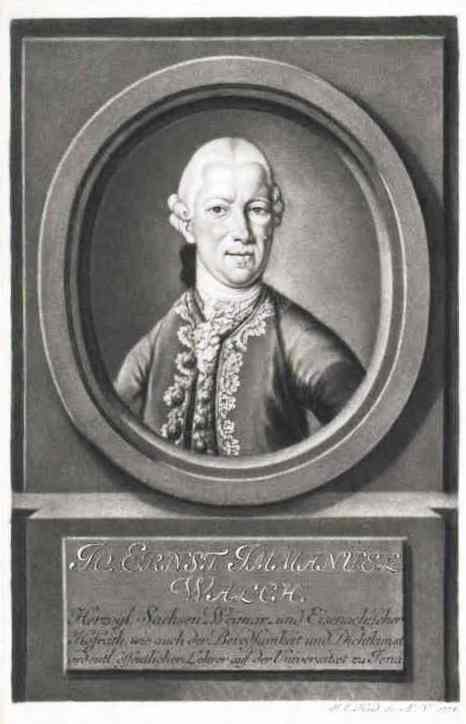
Johann Ernst Immanuel Walch

Johann Ernst Immanuel Walch (29 August 1725 – 1 December 1778) was a German theologian, linguist, and naturalist from Jena.

== Life ==
He was the son of the theologian Johann Georg Walch and the brother of theologian Christian Wilhelm Franz Walch.

He studied Semitic languages at the University of Jena, and also natural science and mathematics. In 1749 he published Einleitung in die Harmonie der Evangelien. In 1750 he was appointed professor extraordinarius of theology. Five years later he became professor ordinarius of logic and metaphysics; in 1759 he exchanged this for a professorship of rhetoric and poetry.

Amongst his theological works were Dissertationes in Acta Apostolorum (1756–1761); Antiquitales symbolicae (1772). After his death his Observationes in Matthaeum ex Graecis inscriptionibus (1779) was published. He also edited a periodical Der Naturforscher (1774–1778), and during the years 1749-1756 he took an active part in editing the Zeitungen von gelehrten Sachen.

"Most of Walch’s interests and publications were on topics in the humanities. These included early Christian church history; New Testament exegesis and commentary; Latin and Greek linguistics, literature, and inscriptions; Roman history and antiquities; Celtic religion; and the history of medicine."

— Kihm & St. John, 2007, p117

In the later part of his career Walch found interest in the natural sciences, particularly fossils and geology. One significant result was the beautifully illustrated, four-volume Die Naturgeschichte der Versteinerungen ("The Natural History of Petrifactions"), released from 1768 to 1773, and also published in French and Dutch editions. A comprehensive chapter on trilobites in 1771 contains the first use of the word "trilobite" and predates other equally comprehensive treatments by 50 years.

"By the end of his career, he had completed over 80 publications (books, chapters, and articles) on various topics in the humanities and about 50 publications in natural history. He became ill in Summer 1778 with the onset of hypochondriac (abdominal) seizures... his death on December 1, 1778, [was] from intestinal infections."

— Kihm & St. John, 2007, p. 117

Walch died in Jena.

== Family ==
He married Wilhelmina Fides Friederika in 1753; they had no children.

== Publications ==
His publications included;

- De magistris veterum Romanorum, 1745;
- Einl. in d. Harmonie d. Evangelisten, 1749;
- Antiquitates Herculanenses litterariae, 1751;
- De mysteriis philosophicis, 1755;
- A Compendious History of the Popes, 1759;
- Introductio in linguam graecam, 1763;
- Observatt. in Matthew ex Graec. Inscriptt, 1779.

== See also ==
- Johann Franz Buddeus, grandfather
- Karl Friedrich Walch, brother
