= Nils Jörn =

German historian and author (born 1964)

Nils Jörn (born 31 October 1964) is a German historian and author. Since 2004 he has been working at the Archive of the Hanseatic City of Wismar, and since 2012 as its director.

== Life ==
Jörn was born in Bergen auf Rügen. After attending school in Usedom and Wolgast, he completed his military service with the NVA from 1983 to 1986. In September 1986 he began studying history and German studies at the Ernst-Moritz-Arndt-Universität Greifswald, where between 1987 and 1990 he specialized in medieval and early modern history under the supervision of Konrad Fritze. He completed his studies in 1991 with the authority to teach history. Subsequently, he stayed at the University Greifswald to complete a research study under the supervision of Horst Wernicke on the subject "The Hanseatic Stalhof in London in the period from 1474 to 1554".

From 1991 to 1992, a research period took him to the German Historical Institute London and the London School of Economics. From 1994 until his doctorate in 1996, he worked as a research assistant on the joint project "The Hanseatic Flemish Trade" at the Universities of Greifswald and Kiel. From 1996 to 1999 he worked on the joint project "The Integration of the Southern Baltic Sea Region into the Old Reich 1555-1806" of the Universities of Greifswald, Kiel and Augsburg. The following two years until 2001 he worked on the project "Judicial activity, personnel structures and politically relevant jurisdiction at the Wismar Tribunal 1653-1806" at the Chair of General History of the Modern Era at the University of Greifswald, funded by the Fritz Thyssen Foundation. He then moved to the Johann Wolfgang Goethe University Frankfurt am Main as a postdoctoral researcher for fifteen months. Between 2002 and 2004 he worked as a scholarship holder of the German Research Foundation at the University of Greifswald in research and teaching.

Since October 2004 Jörn has been working at the archive of the Hanseatic city Wismar. Initially, he worked as a research assistant on the inventory and evaluation of the trial records of the Wismar Tribunal, and since 2012 he has been head of the archive. Since 2006, Jörn has been a member of the board of the Historical Commission for Pomerania and the Society for Pomeranian History, Classical Studies and Art. and since 2008 member of the board of the Hansischer Geschichtsverein, also a member of the Historical Commission for Mecklenburg, founding president of the David Mevius Society and member of the board of the Association of Friends and Sponsors of the Archive of the Hanseatic City of Wismar.

Together with the Greifswald historian Dirk Alvermann, Jörn publishes the Biographical Encyclopaedia for Pomerania.

As author, editor and co-author he is involved in numerous publications.
