= Johann Wilhelm Baier =

German theologian (1647–1695)

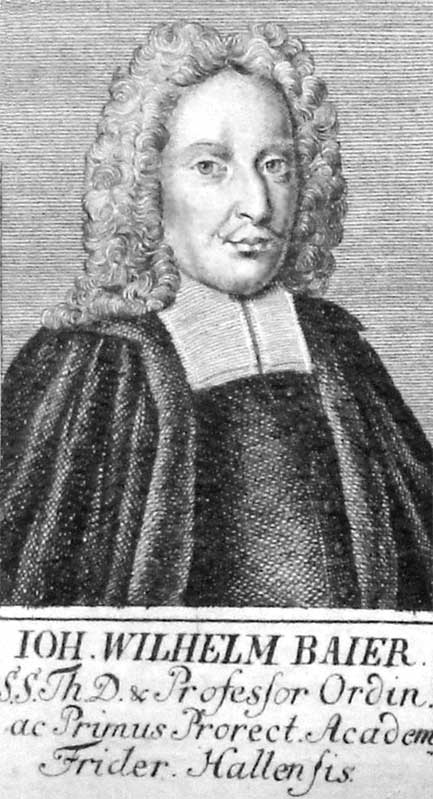
- Born: 11 November 1647
- Died: 19 October 1695 (aged 47)
- Citizenship: Germany
- Education: University of Altdorf

Johann Wilhelm Baier (11 November 1647 – 19 October 1695) was a German theologian in the Lutheran scholastic tradition. He was born at Nuremberg, and died at Weimar.

He studied philology, especially Oriental, and philosophy at Altdorf from 1664 to 1669, in which year he went to Jena and became a disciple of the celebrated Johannes Musäus, the representative of the middle party in the Syncretistic Controversy. Baier married Musäus's daughter in 1674.

Taking his doctor’s degree the same year, in 1675 he became professor of church history at the university, and lectured with great success on several different branches of theology.

In 1682 he was chosen to represent the Protestant side in the negotiations with the papal legate Nicolas Steno, bishop of Titiopolis, for reunion of the Churches. He was three times rector at Jena before he was called by the elector Frederick III, in 1694, as professor and provisional rector to the new university of Halle. Here his devotion to strict orthodoxy brought him into conflict with some of his colleagues, and the pietistic movement also gave him trouble, so that after a year he was glad to accept the combined positions of chief court preacher, superintendent, and pastor at Weimar - which, however, he held only a few months until his death.

He left a name in the history of theology, especially by his dogmatic compendium, which still preserves the early Protestant traditions among High Lutherans, especially in America. The Jena theologians, and Johannes Musaeus in particular, had been asked by Ernest the Pious to draw up such a work, to take the place of the antiquated Hutter, and Musæus urged his son-in-law to do it. The first edition appeared in 1686. The second edition, enlarged, was published in 1691, and it has been frequently reprinted since. It was commended for general use as a textbook by its method, its conciseness, and its absence of mere polemics. It was obviously, however, intended by its author as a vindication of the Jena theology, which had been sharply attacked from Wittenberg, and lay under some suspicion of syncretism. Its dependence upon Musæus is really the distinguishing feature of the book, which is largely a compilation from him. Baier’s other works include polemical writings against Erbermann, a convert to Roman Catholicism and a Jesuit, and against the Quakers; and three other compendiums, published after his death (1698), one of exegetical, and one of moral theology, as well as one of the history of dogma. His read significance lies in the fact that he handed on and popularized the theology of Musæus; and his work was continued by Buddeus, whom he left at Halle as professor of moral philosophy.

== Family ==
Baier was married to Anna Catharina Musäus.

He was the father of physician Johann Jacob Baier, and theologians Johann David Baier and Johann Wilhelm Baier Junior.
