= Johann Franz Buddeus =

German Lutheran theologian and philosopher (1667–1729)

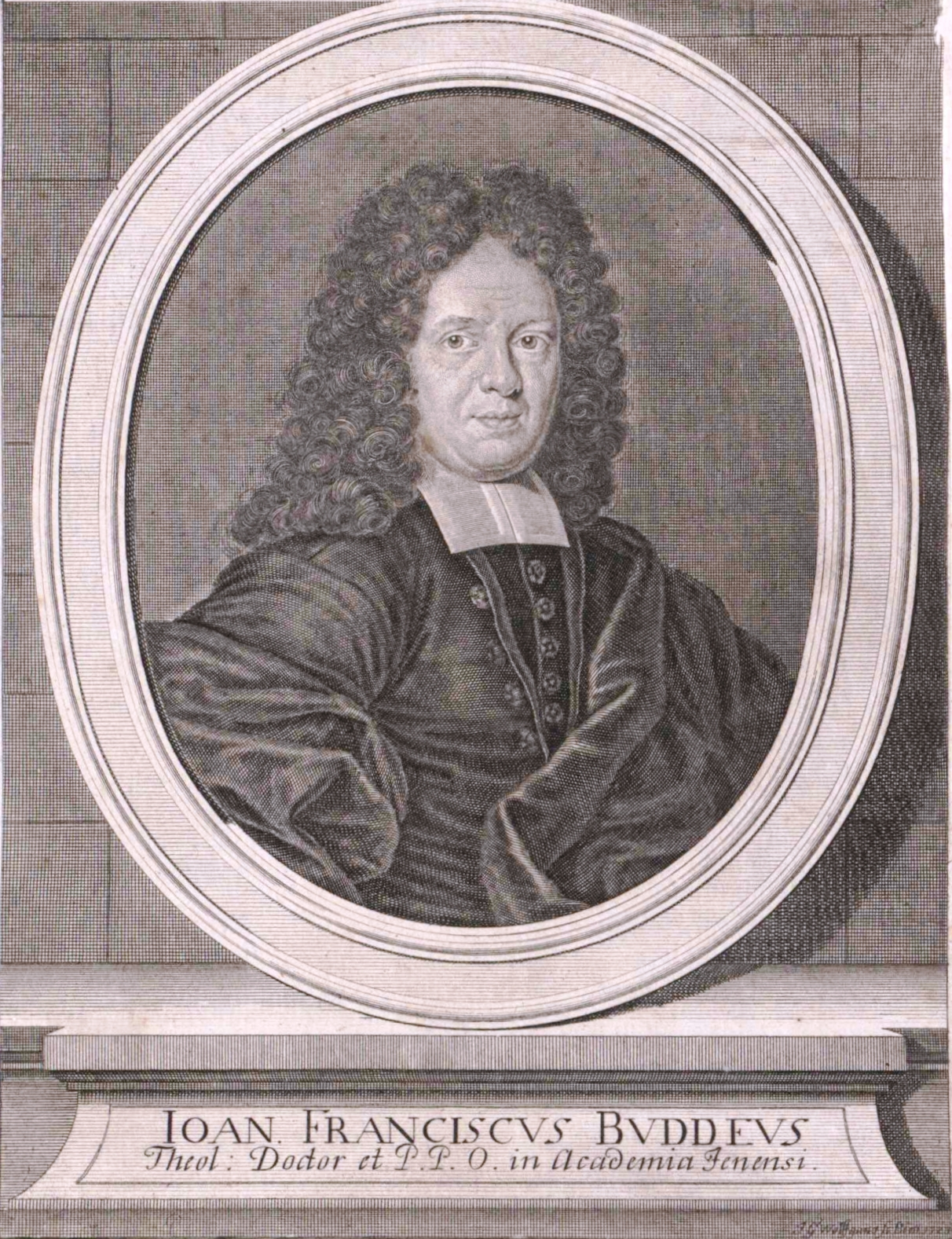
Johann Franz Buddeus

Johann Franz Buddeus or Budde (sometimes Johannes Franciscus Buddeus; 25 June 1667, Anklam – 19 November 1729, Gotha) was a German Lutheran theologian and philosopher.

== Early life and education ==
Buddeus was a descendant of the French scholar Guillaume Budé, also known by the Latinized name Budaeus; the Huguenots family fled France after the St. Bartholomew's Day Massacre, and those who emigrated to Pomerania Germanized their name as Budde, the Latin equivalent of which was Buddeus.

He was born at Anklam, Swedish Pomerania, where his father was pastor. He early received a thorough education in classical and Oriental languages, and had read the Bible through in the original before he went to the University of Wittenberg in 1685. He was appointed adjunct professor of philosophy there soon after taking his master's degree in 1687, and in 1689 exchanged this for a similar position at Jena, where he also paid much attention to the study of history.

== Career ==
In 1692, he went to Coburg as professor of Greek and Latin in a Gymnasium, and the next year to the new University of Halle as professor of moral philosophy; he remained at Halle until 1705, when he went to Jena as professor of theology. His lectures embraced all branches of this science, and frequently touched on philosophy, history, and politics.

He remained at Jena for the rest of his life, several times acting as rector of the university temporarily and being head of his department and an ecclesiastical councilor from 1715.

He was considered the most universally accomplished German theologian of his time. In philosophy he professed an eclecticism which rested on a broad historical foundation; but he recognized in Descartes the originator of a new period, and in attacking the "atheist" Spinoza followed especially the upholders of the law of nature, such as Hugo Grotius, Puffendorf, and Thomasius. His theological position was determined by the tradition of Johannes Musäus at Jena, partly through his close relations with Baier; but on another side he was inclined toward Pietism.

== Works ==
His works number over a hundred.

Those published during the Halle period include Elementa philosophiæ practicæ (1697) and Elementa philosophiæ eclecticæ (1703).

To the second Jena period belong among others;

- Institutiones theologiæ moralis (1711; German transl., 1719), a work strictly in accordance with his philosophical ethics
- Historia ecclesiastica veteris testamenti (1715–18)
- Theses theologicæ de atheismo et superstitione (1716), which, directed especially against Spinoza, attracted much attention
- Institutiones theologiæ dogmaticæ (1723), a work once very influential, obviously founded on Baier's Compendium
- Historische und theologische Einleitung in die vornehmsten Religionsstreitigkeiten (1724, 1728), edited by Walch
- Isagoge historico-theologica ad theologiam universam (1727), dealing with the problems methods, and history of theology in a way remarkable for that time
- Ecclesia apostolica (1729), intended as an introduction to the study of the New Testament.
- Observationes Theol. De Paedobaptismo Oppositae Clarissimo Viro Antonio Van Dalen
- Divinae Providentiae Circa Ecclesiae Reformationem a B. Martino Luthero Susceptam Assertio
- Galilaeam Rebus Gestis Et Miraculis Christi Claram

== Family ==
His daughter Charlotte Katharina Buddeus married theologian Johann Georg Walch; their sons Johann Ernst Immanuel Walch and Christian Wilhelm Franz Walch were also noted theologians.

== Collected works ==
- Gesammelte Schriften. Reprint Hildesheim, Georg Olms, 1999–2006 (10 vols.)
