= Calov Bible =

17th-century German-language Bible

The Calov Bible is a three-volume 17th-century Bible that contains German translations and commentary by Martin Luther and additional commentary by Wittenberg theology professor Abraham Calovius.

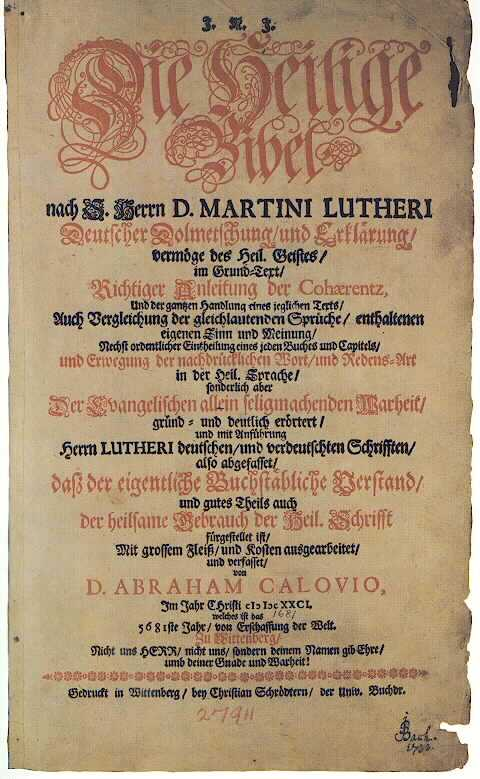
Title page of the Calov Bible, with Bach's signature and date (1733) in the bottom right hand corner

== Connection with J. S. Bach ==
The Calov Bible was made famous with the discovery of a long-lost copy that had once belonged to the composer Johann Sebastian Bach. At the time of his death, the inventory of Bach's library specified ownership of Calovii Schrifften ("Writings of Calovius"). It was not known until the 20th century what these writings were.

In June 1934, a Lutheran pastor named Christian G. Riedel was attending a convention of the Lutheran Church–Missouri Synod in Frankenmuth, Michigan. While a guest in the home of his cousin, Leonard Reichle, Riedel was shown a volume of the Bible in which he recognized Bach's signature on the title page. Reichle subsequently located the other two volumes in his attic, relating that his family had purchased them in the 1830s in Philadelphia. In October 1938, Reichle donated the three volumes to the Concordia Seminary Library in St. Louis, Missouri. Only after the upheavals of World War II, however, did this Bible become known to Bach scholarship. In 1985 two books on the annotations and its translations and interpretations were published. At the end of 2017, a facsimile reprint of Bach's Bible was published by the Dutch publisher Van Wijnen of Franeker, in close co-operation with the owners, Concordia Seminary Library.

The Calov Bible is in three volumes, each signed on its main title page by J. S. Bach, who followed his signature with the date, 1733. The volumes contain 348 underlinings, marks of emphasis, and marginalia in Bach's hand, an attribution that has been proven by handwriting analysis and chemical analysis of the ink. In many instances Bach was correcting typographical or grammatical errors. Three of Bach's more important annotations are in proximity to the following passages.

Bible passage	Bible text (KJV)	Bachs's annotation
Exodus 15:20	And Miriam the prophetess, the sister of Aaron, took a timbrel in her hand; and all the women went out after her with timbrels and with dances.	First prelude for two choirs to be sung to the glory of God.
I Chronicles 25	... who should prophesy with harps, with psalteries, and with cymbals ... who prophesied with a harp ... All these were under the hands of their father for song in the house of the LORD, with cymbals, psalteries, and harps, for the service of the house of God ...	This chapter is the true foundation of all God-pleasing church music.
I Chronicles 28:21	And, behold, the courses of the priests and the Levites, even they shall be with thee for all the service of the house of God: and there shall be with thee for all manner of workmanship every willing skilful man, for any manner of service: also the princes and all the people will be wholly at thy commandment. Leaver remarks that the musicians of the old covenant were members of the Levites, see also I Chronicles 9:33 and 15:16.	Splendid proof that, besides other arrangements of the service of worship, music too was instituted by the Spirit of God through David.
II Chronicles 5:12-13	Also the Levites which were the singers, all of them of Asaph, of Heman, of Jeduthun, with their sons and their brethren, being arrayed in white linen, having cymbals and psalteries and harps, stood at the east end of the altar, and with them an hundred and twenty priests sounding with trumpets:) 13 It came even to pass, as the trumpeters and singers were as one, to make one sound to be heard in praising and thanking the LORD; and when they lifted up their voice with the trumpets and cymbals and instruments of musick, and praised the LORD, saying, For he is good; for his mercy endureth for ever: that then the house was filled with a cloud, even the house of the LORD;	In devotional music, God is always present with His Grace.
