= Johann Georg Macasius =

German physician (1617–1653)

- Born: 17 March 1617; Eger, Kingdom of Bohemia, Holy Roman Empire
- Died: 1653 (aged 35–36); Zwickau, Holy Roman Empire
- Education: University of Jena
- Scientific career
- Fields: Physician
- Workplaces: University of Jena
- Doctoral advisor: Johannes Musaeus; Balthasar Widmarcter
- Doctoral students: Georg Balthasar Metzger

Johann Georg Macasius (1617–1653) was a physician from the Holy Roman Empire. He was born in Eger, Bohemia (part of the Holy Roman Empire, now in the Czech Republic).

== Education ==
He received the Medicinae Doctorate from the University of Jena in 1638 under Johannes Musaeus with a thesis entitled De natura et causis externis. In 1640, he received a second Medicinae Doctorate from the University of Jena under Balthasar Widmarcter with a thesis entitled Disputatio de inflammatione.

== Books by Macasius ==
- Johann Georg Macasius and Johann Mathias Nester, Promptuarium materiae medicae, sive Apparatus ad praxim medicam libris duobus adornatus (1654).
