= Johann Jacob Baier =

German physician and naturalist

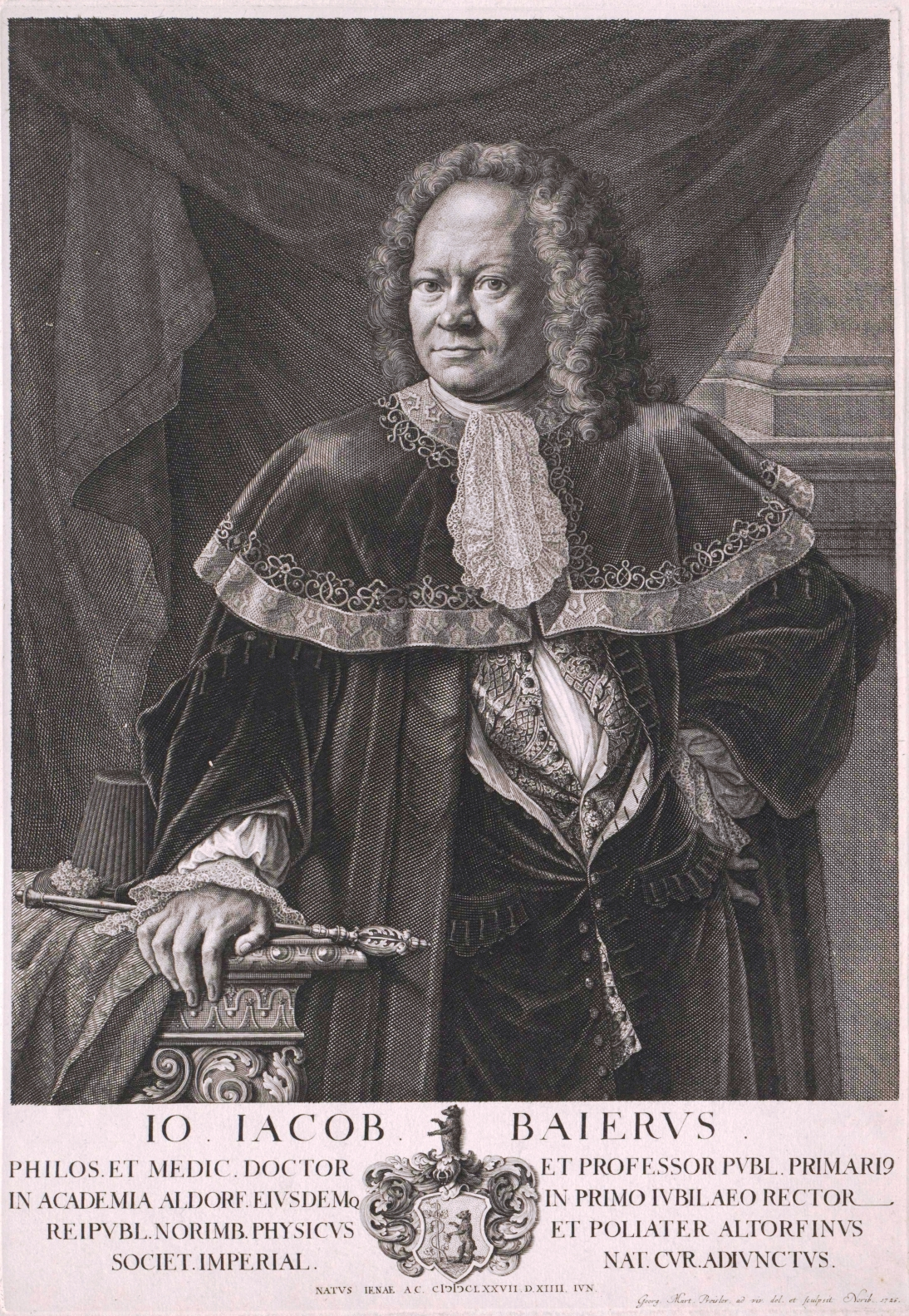

Johann Jacob Baier (14 June 1677 – 14 July 1735) was a German physician and naturalist who wrote on the geology and fossils of the Nuremberg area in his book Oryctographia Norica. He considered the Deluge of the Bible to be the only catastrophe to have occurred in earth history.

== Life and work ==
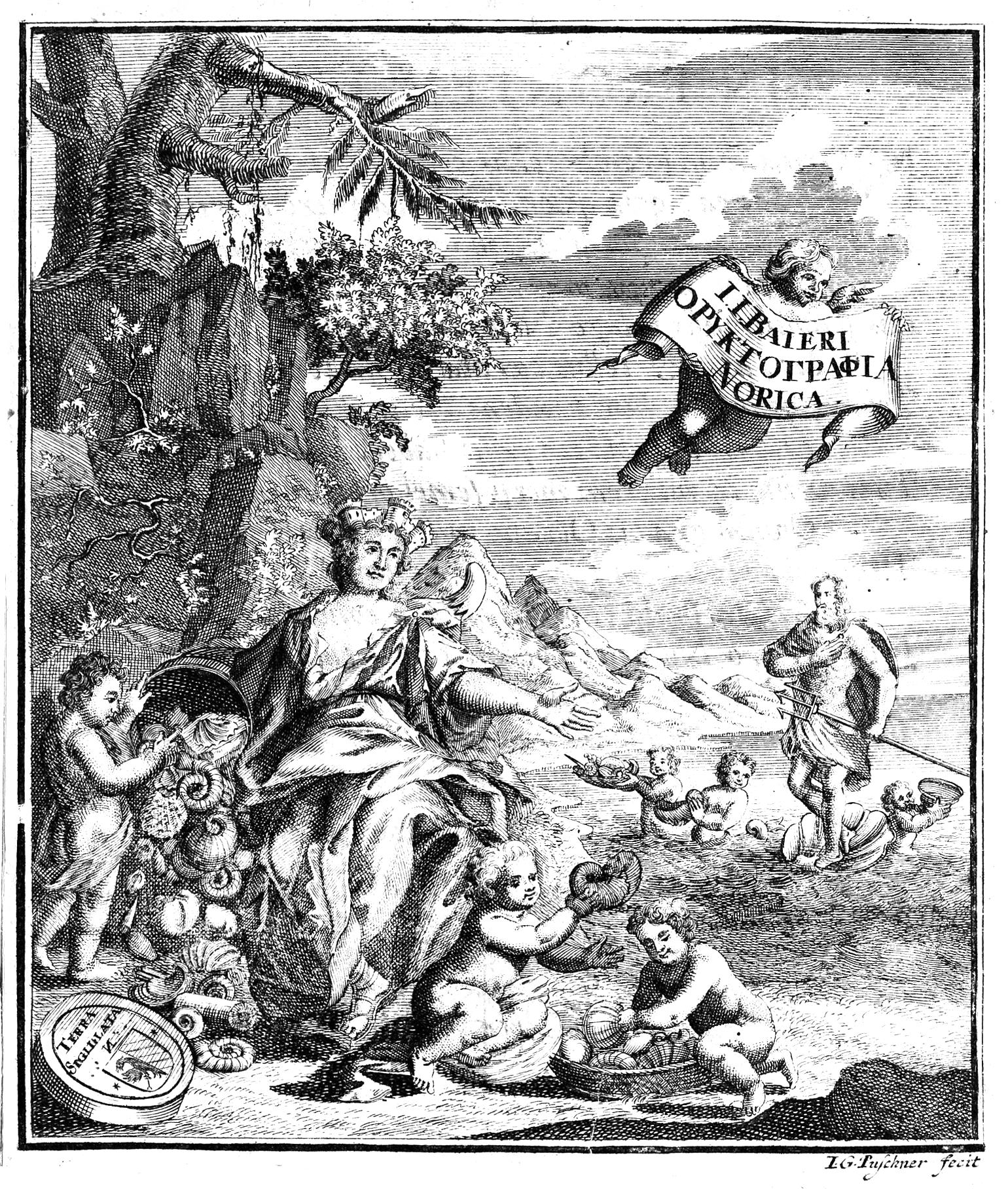
Frontispiece from Oryctographia Norica depicting a beach with putti presenting Cybele with baskets of ammonites, fossil echinoderms, belemnites, etc., while Neptune rides on a shell on the sea surrounded by naiads bearing baskets of shells showing the affinities of the living and fossil forms.

Baier was born in Jena, the son of theologian Johann Wilhelm Baier and Anna Katharine Musaeus; he was the grandson of theologian Johannes Musaeus.

He was educated at Jena then received a degree in medicine from Halle after which he became a professor at Altdorf, Switzerland from 1704. He became a personal physician to the Emperor in 1731. Baier was elected to the Leopoldina Academy over which he presided from 1731. Apart from his collections of fossils, he also collected portraits of learned people, with a collection of nearly 600 of them. Baier also published a biographical account of the medical faculty at Altdorf. His son Ferdinand Jacob Baier (1707-1788) was also a physician and naturalist.

His specimens are distributed in collections. A specimen of the ammonite Phylloceras heterophyllum was purchased by the Jena museum in 1728.
