= Birgit Dahlenburg =

German art historian

- Born: Birgit Handschel; 16 April 1959; Heldburg
- Died: 29 January 2017 (aged 57); Greifswald
- Education: University of Greifswald
- Occupation: Art historian
- Organization: University of Greifswald

Birgit Dahlenburg, née Handschel (16 April 1959 – 29 January 2017) was a German art historian. She worked as custodian for the art collections of the University of Greifswald and was instrumental in digitising art.

== Life ==
Born in Heldburg, she studied German studies, art history and art didactics at the University of Greifswald. She received her doctorate in art history there in 1986 with a dissertation on the history of romantic art in Northern Germany. She worked as a research assistant for the Chair of Contemporary Art History from 1987.

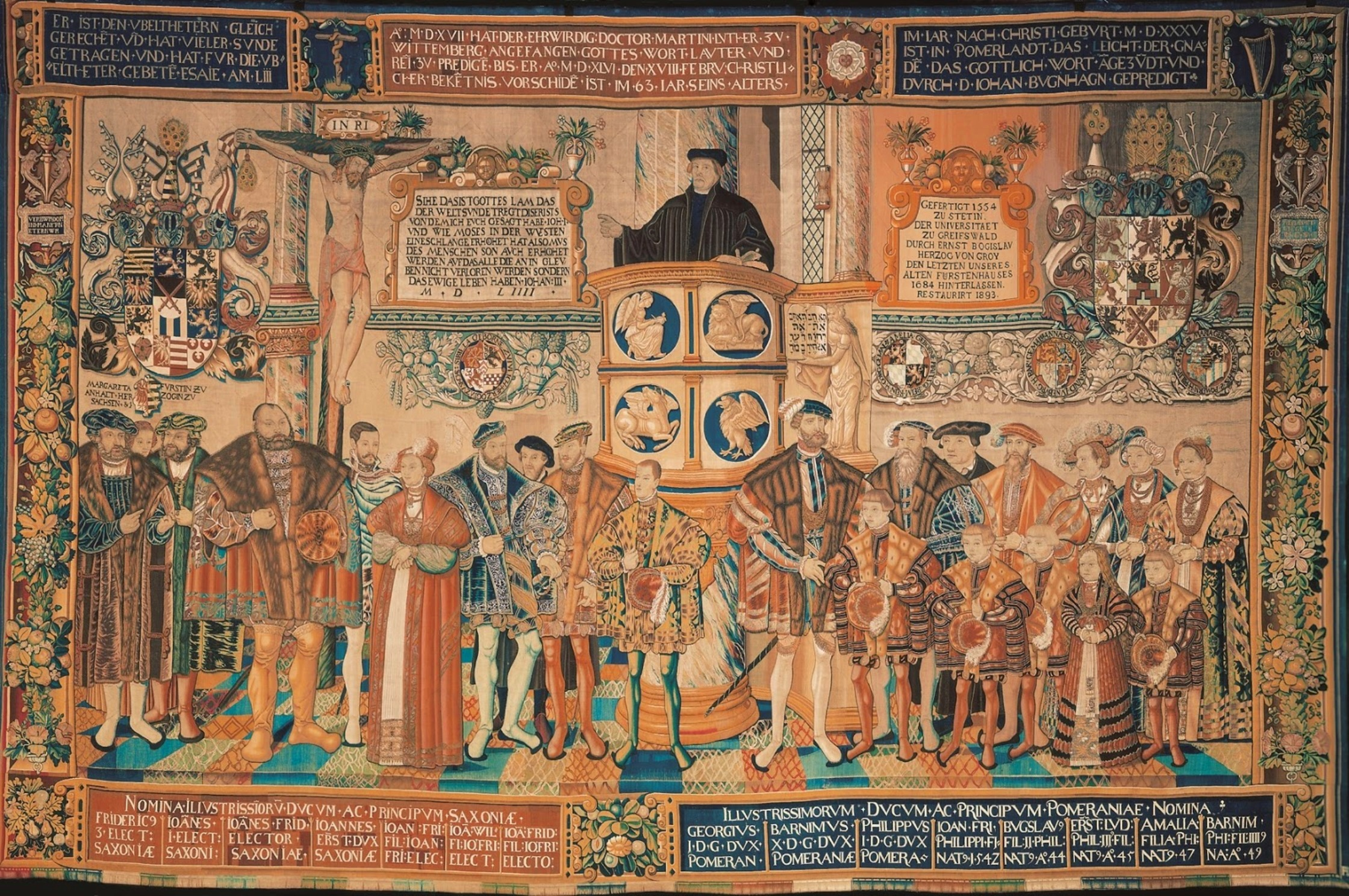
Croy Tapestry

From 1988 to 1989 Dahlenburg was head of the graphics department at the Kunstsammlungen Zwickau. In 1989, she was appointed university curator and director of the Academic Art Collection of the university, where she was also a research assistant for the university's chair of Neuere Kunstgeschichte des Caspar-David-Friedrich-Instituts für Kunst und Kunstwissenschaft. She organised exhibitions and published books about treasures of the collection, such as the Croÿ-Teppich and the Pomeranian Fishermen's Tapestry). The Croy Tapestry was included in the list of National wertvolles Kulturgut (Cultural heritage of national value), due to her efforts.

From 2013 Dahlenburg was a member of the board of the Digicult-Verbund eG, a cooperative society which has set itself the goal of long-term safeguarding cultural heritage through digital recording and distribution. In addition, she was an active member of the German Museum Association, the International Council of Museums (ICOM) and the Coordination Office for Scientific Collections in Germany.

Dahlenburg died in Greifswald at age 57.

== Publications ==
- Kunstbesitz und Sammlungen der Ernst-Moritz-Arndt-Universität Greifswald. Edit.: Ernst-Moritz-Arndt-Universität Greifswald. Hinstorff Verlag, Rostock 1995.
- Der Croÿ-Teppich der Ernst-Moritz-Arndt-Universität Greifswald. Thomas Helms Verlag, Schwerin 2000.
- with Dirk Alvermann: Greifswalder Köpfe. Gelehrtenporträts und Lebensbilder des 16.–18. Jahrhunderts aus der pommerschen Landesuniversität. Hinstorff, Rostock 2006, ISBN 3-356-01139-1.
- with Kurt Feltkamp: Pommersche Fischerteppiche der Ernst-Moritz-Arndt Universität Greifswald. Greifswald 2008.
- Künstlerisch bewundert und von der Staatssicherheit verfolgt – der Surrealist Manfred Kastner (1943–1988). Greifswald 2008.
