= Syncretistic controversy =

The syncretistic controversy was the theological debate focusing on efforts to unite Protestant churches in 17th century Germany.

Syncretism in a religious setting occurs when two religious systems come together or emphasise their similarities.

== Debate ==
The syncretistic controversy began when Georg Calixtus and his supporters decided to work to secure a basis on which Lutherans could have a good relationship with both the Reformed Church and the Roman Catholic Church. The resulting controversy was headed by three men, Calixt, Abraham Calov, who supported the Lutheran cause above other Christian groups, and Johannes Musaeus, who disagreed with both Calixt and Calov; in particular, the three disagreed on which articles of faith were essential in order to become a genuine Christian.

It lasted from 1640 to 1686.

== Georg Calixtus ==
Calixtus, a professor at Helmstedt, had travelled through England, the Netherlands, Italy, and France. His acquaintance with the different churches and their representatives there, and his extensive study, had given him a more friendly attitude towards the different religious bodies than the majority of his contemporary Lutheran theologians.

While the latter firmly adhered to the "pure doctrine", Calixtus tended not to regard doctrine as the one thing necessary for a Christian and did not regard everything in doctrine as equally certain and important. Consequently, he advocated unity between those who agreed on the fundamental minimum, and liberty with regard to the less fundamental points. In regard to Catholicism, he would have (as Melanchthon once would have) conceded to the pope a primacy by human right, rather than divine right; he also stated that one might call the Mass a sacrifice.

Abraham Calov in particular opposed Calixtus. In 1645, he prevented Calixtus from attending the Colloquy of Thorn as a representative of Dantzic. Calixtus eventually attended with the Königsberg group and publicly renounced the Reformed Confession of Thorn.

The theological faculties of universities in Helmstedt, Rinteln, and Königsberg stood with Calixtus the theologians of the universities of the Leipzig, Jena, Strasburg, Giessen, Marburg, and Greifswald stood in opposition to his views.

== Elector of Saxony ==
The Elector of Saxony, for political reasons, opposed the Reformed Church, as the other two secular electors (Palatine and Brandenburg) were Reformed, and were gaining an advantage on him. In 1649, he sent a communication to the three dukes of Brunswick, who maintained Helmstedt as their common university, in which he voiced all the objections of his Lutheran professors, and complained that Calixtus wanted to extract the elements of truth from all religions, fuse them into an entirely new religion, and so provoke a violent schism.

In 1650, Calov became a professor at Wittenberg, marking his entrance into office with a vehement attack on the syncretists in Helmstedt. A stream of polemical writings followed. In 1650, the dukes of Brunswick responded to the Elector of Saxony, urging that the discord not be allowed to continue and proposing a meeting of the political councillors. Saxony, however, did not favour this suggestion. An attempt to convene a meeting of theologians was not successful. The theologians of Wittenberg and Leipzig then elaborated a new formula, condemning 98 heresies of the Helmstedt theologians. This formula (consensus) was to be signed by everyone who wanted to remain in the Lutheran Church. Outside Wittenberg and Leipzig, however, it was not accepted, and Calixtus' death in 1656 ushered in five years of almost undisturbed peace.

== Strife in Hesse-Kassel ==
The disagreement arose again in Hesse-Kassel, where Landgrave William VI sought to unite his Lutheran and Reformed subjects, or at least to lessen their mutual hatred. In 1661, he held a colloquy in Cassel between two Lutheran theologians of the University of Rinteln and two from the Reformed theologians of the University of Marburg. They drew up a statement which recognised differences of opinion between the parties, but at the same-time showed an agreement between them on all essential matters. It urged the exercise of brotherly love and the recognition that both parties belonged to one Church, shared in a common faith, and looked forward to a shared heaven.

The Wittenberg theologians were angered at this revival of syncretism and called on all Lutherans to reject the colloquy. They also called on the Rinteln professors to make their submission, whereupon the latter answered with a detailed defence. Another long series of polemical treatises followed.

== Disputes in Brandenburg-Prussia ==
In 1663 in Brandenburg-Prussia, the "Great Elector" Frederick William I forbade preachers to speak of the disputes between the Evangelical bodies.

A long colloquy in Berlin (September 1662 to May 1663) led only to fresh discord and the conferences ended in 1664 with the publication of another "syncretistic" edict. Since the edict disallowed the Formula of Concord (one of the Lutheran Confessions as contained in the 1580 Book of Concord), many Lutheran clergy refused to comply with the edict.

Any person refusing to sign the form declaring his intention to observe this regulation was deprived of his position, including Paul Gerhardt, a pastor and noted hymnwriter. The citizens of Berlin petitioned to have him restored and, owing to their repeated requests, an exception was made for him, although his conscience did not allow him to retain a post which, as it appeared to him, could be held only on condition of a tacit repudiation of the Formula of Concord. He continued to live in Berlin for over a year without a secure job. During this time his wife died, leaving him with one surviving child. The edict was withdrawn a few months later, although by this time his patroness, Electress Louisa Henrietta had died and so he was still without a position.

Many Lutherans choose to move abroad rather than sign the form.

== Final phase ==
The attempts of the Wittenberg theologians to declare Calixtus and his school un-Lutheran and heretical were now met by Calixtus' son, Friedrich Ulrich Calixtus. The latter defended the theology of his father, but also tried to show that his doctrine did not differ much from that of his opponents. Wittenberg found its new champion in Aegidius Strauch, who attacked Calixtus with all the resources of learning: polemics, sophistry, wit, cynicism, and abuse. The Helmstedt side was defended by the scholar and statesman Hermann Conring. The Saxon princes now recognized the danger that the attempt to carry through the "Consensus" as a formula of belief might lead to a fresh schism in the Lutheran Church, and might thus render its position difficult in the face of the Catholics.

The proposals of Calov and his party to continue the refutation and to compel the Brunswick theologians to bind themselves under obligation to the old Lutheran confession therefore remained unimplemented. The Saxon theologians were forbidden to continue the controversy in writing.

Negotiations for peace were established, with Duke Ernst the Pious of Saxe-Gotha especially active. The work of establishing a permanent college of theologians to decide theological disputes was considered. The negotiations with the courts of Brunswick, Mecklenburg, Denmark, and Sweden were fruitless; the only benefit was that peace was maintained until 1675. Calov then renewed hostilities. He attacked not only Calixtus, but also and particularly the moderate John Musæus of Jena. By 1679, Calov had succeeded in having the University of Jena (and after a long resistance, Musæus himself) compelled to renounce syncretism. The elector renewed his prohibition against polemical writings. This was Calov's last victory. In 1680, Johann Georg II of Saxony passed away and Calov lost his strongest supporter in his campaign.

Calov seemed to give way in 1683 when he asked whether, in the view of the danger that France constituted for Germany, a Calixtine Syncretism with "Papists" and the Reformed was still condemnable, and in deference to the Elector of Brandenburg and the dukes of Brunswick, the strife should be buried by an amnesty, or whether, on the contrary, the war against syncretism should be continued.

Calov later returned to his attack on the syncretists, but died in 1686. The syncrestic controversy ended with his death.

== Aftermath ==
The Syncretistic Controversy had the result of lessening religious hatred and of promoting mutual forbearance. Catholicism thus benefited, as Protestants came to better understand and appreciate it. In Protestant theology it prepared the way for the sentimental theology of Pietism to become more popular than orthodoxy.

== Additional perspectives ==
While traditional accounts focus on Calixtus and Calovius, recent scholarship and primary documents offer deeper insight.

For example, Calixtus' own writings and correspondence (published from Wolfenbüttel manuscripts) reveal his network of international contacts and detailed proposals.

The conflict also had "regional ripple effects" beyond Germany: Protestant princes in Denmark and Sweden monitored it, and their theological faculties (such as Jesper Brochmand in Denmark) debated related issues. Archival records (ducal letters, synod reports) show that secular leaders such as Duke Ernst of Gotha attempted to arbitrate peace.

Neglected in many retellings is the Eastern Orthodox dimension: Calixtus even corresponded with Greek monastics (Metrophanes Kritopoulos) exploring union with Constantinople. Later figures such as Hermann Conring (professor and philosopher at Helmstedt) and moderate Johann Musæus played key roles that older narratives underemphasize.
