= Dirk Alvermann =

German historian (1965–2023)

Dirk Alvermann (24 December 1965 – 17 October 2023) was a German historian and archivist.

== Early life and education ==
Born in Berlin, Alvermann was the son of the photographer Dirk Alvermann. From 1988 he studied archive science and history at the Humboldt-Universität zu Berlin and the Sapienza University of Rome. In 1993 he took his master's degree in Berlin. Alvermann was a scholarship holder of the German Historical Institute in Rome in 1994. In 1995, he received his doctorate in Berlin with a dissertation suggested by Eckhard Müller-Mertens and supervised by Michael Borgolte on the integration of the Reich and the practice of rule under Kaiser, Otto II, Holy Roman Emperor.

== Career ==
=== Posts ===
After his doctorate, Alvermann worked for the Landesarchiv Greifswald and the Landesarchiv Sachsen-Anhalt. Since 1998 he has been director of the Universitätsarchiv Greifswald. Alvermann is member of the Historical Commission for Pomerania and was from 2001 to 2011 as editor of the Baltic studies board member of the Gesellschaft für pommersche Geschichte, Altertumskunde und Kunst. Since 2011 he has been a member of the board of directors of the society.

=== Research ===
Alvermann's research focuses on medieval diplomatics, archival studies, history of Pomerania and university history.

In his dissertation, Alvermann used the methods of itinerary analysis of Müller-Mertens' "Reichtsstruktur und Herrschaftspraxis Otto II". He not only concentrated on the northern alpine region, but also included Italy in his analysis. Alvermann concluded that "the structural characteristics of the early medieval East Franconian German Empire, which Müller-Mertens described on the basis of Otto I's itinerarium, are also confirmed for Otto II's reign". However, there are "partial discontinuities with regard to the structure of the empire and the practice of rule". Thus, under Otto II, all of Thuringia became a close zone of royal rule. The two southern German duchies Bavaria and Swabia remained also under Otto II's far zones of the royal rule. Otto II visited the "political central areas" in the north, especially during the high church festivals. Italy was a "development and construction phase" both for Otto I's reign and for his son. The presence in Salerno is "perhaps the most striking sign of an intensification of rule in the Lombard south" under Otto II. Together with the historian Nils Jörn, Alvermann was editor of the Biographisches Lexikon für Pommern.

== Death ==
Dirk Alvermann died on 17 October 2023, at the age of 57.

== Publications ==
Monographs

- Königsherrschaft und Reichsintegration. Eine Untersuchung zur politischen Struktur von regna und imperium zur Zeit Kaiser Ottos II. (967) 973–983 (Berliner historische Studien. Vol. 28). Duncker und Humblot, Berlin 1998, ISBN 3-428-09190-6 (At the same time: Berlin, Humboldt-Universität, dissertation, 1995).

Editorial boards

- ... die letzten Schranken fallen lassen. Studien zur Universität Greifswald im Nationalsozialismus. Böhlau, Cologne among others. 2015, ISBN 978-3-412-22398-4}.
- with Karl-Heinz Spieß: Quellen zur Verfassungsgeschichte der Universität Greifswald. (Beiträge zur Geschichte der Universität Greifswald. vol. 10, 1–3). 3 volumes. Steiner, Stuttgart 2011–2014;
  - Volume 1: Benjamin Müsegades, Sabine-Maria Weitzel: Von der Universitätsgründung bis zum Westfälischen Frieden. 1456–1648. 2011, ISBN 978-3-515-09655-3;
  - Volume 2: Marco Pohlmann-Linke, Sabine-Maria Weitzel: Die schwedische Großmachtzeit bis zum Ende des Großen Nordischen Krieges 1649–1720. 2012, ISBN 978-3-515-09834-2;
  - Volume 3: Sabine-Maria Weitzel, Marco Pohlmann-Linke: Von der Freiheitszeit bis zum Übergang an Preußen 1721–1815. 2014, ISBN 978-3-515-10420-3.
- with Irmfried Garbe: Ernst Moritz Arndt. Anstöße und Wirkungen (= Veröffentlichungen der Historischen Kommission für Pommern. 5th series: Forschungen zur Pommerschen Geschichte. Vol. 46). Böhlau, Cologne among others 2011, ISBN 978-3-412-20763-2.
- with Karl-Heinz Spieß: Bausteine zur Greifswalder Universitätsgeschichte. Vorträge anlässlich des Jubiläums „550 Jahre Universität Greifswald“ (Beiträge zur Geschichte der Universität Greifswald. Vol. 8). Steiner, Stuttgart 2008, ISBN 978-3-515-09151-0.
- with Nils Jörn and Jens E. Olesen: Die Universität Greifswald in der Bildungslandschaft des Ostseeraums (Nordische Geschichte. Vol. 5). Lit, Berlin among others 2007, ISBN 978-3-8258-0189-2.
- with Irmfried Garbe and Manfred Herling: Gerhardt Katsch: Greifswalder Tagebuch 1946–47. Ludwig, Kiel 2007, ISBN 978-3-937719-70-2 (several editions).
- with Birgit Dahlenburg: Greifswalder Köpfe. Gelehrtenporträts und Lebensbilder des 16.–18. Jahrhunderts aus der pommerschen Landesuniversität. Hinstorff, Rostock 2006, ISBN 3-356-01139-1 (Review).
