= Abraham Calovius =

Lutheran theologian (1612–1686)

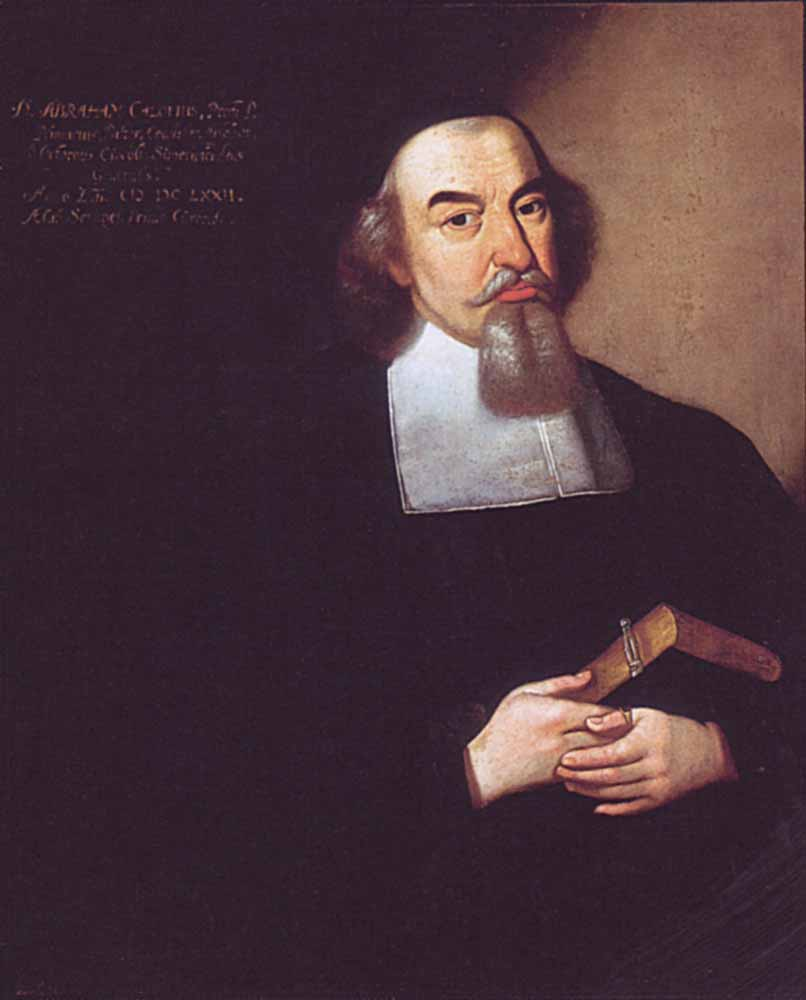
- Abraham Calovius
- Born: 16 April 1612; Morąg, Ducal Prussia
- Died: 25 February 1686 (aged 73); Lutherstadt Wittenberg, Electorate of Saxony
- Other names: Abraham Calov; Abraham Kalau
- Education: University of Königsberg; University of Rostock
- Occupations: Theologian; University teacher; Writer; Mathematician; Philosopher
- Spouses: Regina Calov; Dorothea Elisabeth Hülsemann; Dorothea Quenstedt
- Children: Abraham Calov

Ecclesiastical career
- Church: Lutheranism
- Writings: Systema locorum theologicorum; Biblia Illustrata; Die deutsche Bibel (Calov Bible)
- Offices held: General Superintendent and Primarius at Wittenberg

Abraham Calovius (also Abraham Calov or Abraham Kalau; 16 April 1612 – 25 February 1686) was a Lutheran theologian, and was one of the champions of Lutheran orthodoxy in the 17th century.

== Biography ==
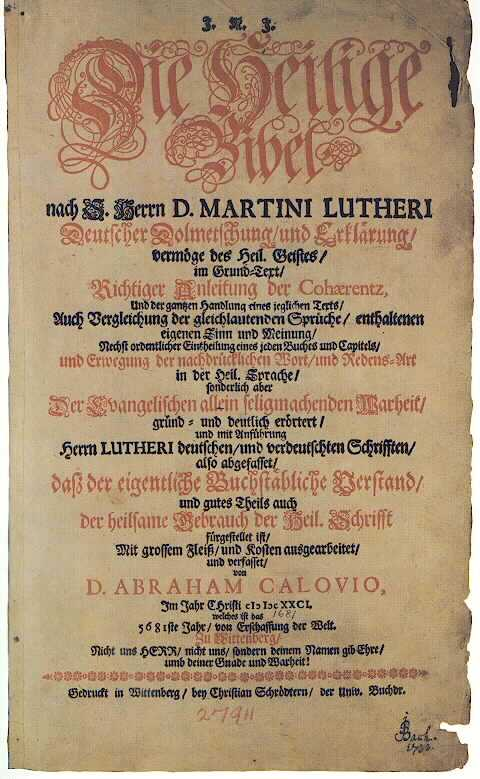
Title page of the Calov Bible, with Bach's signature in the bottom right hand corner.

He was born in Mohrungen (Morąg), Ducal Prussia, a fief of Crown of Poland. After studying at Königsberg, in 1650 he was appointed professor of theology at Wittenberg, where he afterwards became general superintendent and primarius. He lived in Wittenberg for the rest of his life.

=== Theology ===
Calovius opposed the Catholics, Calvinists and Socinians, and in particular attacked the syncretism of his bitter enemy, George Calixtus. While Calixtus affirmed that the Apostles' Creed was an adequate definition of faith, Calovius rather held that one must believe every part of revealed truth in order to gain salvation. This led Calovius to deny as a heresy the idea that Roman Catholics or Calvinists could be partakers of salvation.

=== Writings ===
As a writer of polemics Calovius had few equals. His chief dogmatic work, Systema locorum theologicorum, (12 volumes, 1655–1677) represents the climax of Lutheran scholasticism. He produced a popular commentary on Martin Luther's translation of the Bible, "Die deutsche Bibel," today known as the Calov Bible. He also wrote a much larger professional exegetical work on the entire Bible called "Biblia Illustrata". It is written from the point of view of a very strict belief in inspiration, his object being to refute the statements made by Hugo Grotius in his Commentaries.

==== Works (selection) ====
- Tractatus Novus De Methodo Docendi & Disputandi, 1632.
- Metaphysica divina. Rostock, Hallervord, 1640.
- Scripta philosophica. Lübeck, Wilden, 1651.
- Systematis locorum theologicorum. :"Système de prémisses théologiques issues des écrits les plus sacrés de l'Antiquité :" Wittenberg 1655–1677 (12 volumes).
- Bergius senior autokatakritos gemino tractatu ... palam demonstratus, Wittenberg, 1658
- Biblia illustrata. Frankfurt am Main 1672–1676 and 1719 (4 volumes).
- Curcellaei religio triplex ad unius fidei catholicae simplicitatem revocata, 1678
- Theologia positiva., Wittenberg 1682.

== Family ==
Calovius was married six times; his third marriage was to the daughter of Johann Hülsemann while his last wedding was at the age of 72, to Dorothea Quenstedt.

== See also ==
Syncretistic Controversy
