= Georg Calixtus =

German Lutheran theologian (1586–1656)

Georg Calixtus Kallisøn/Kallisön Callisen
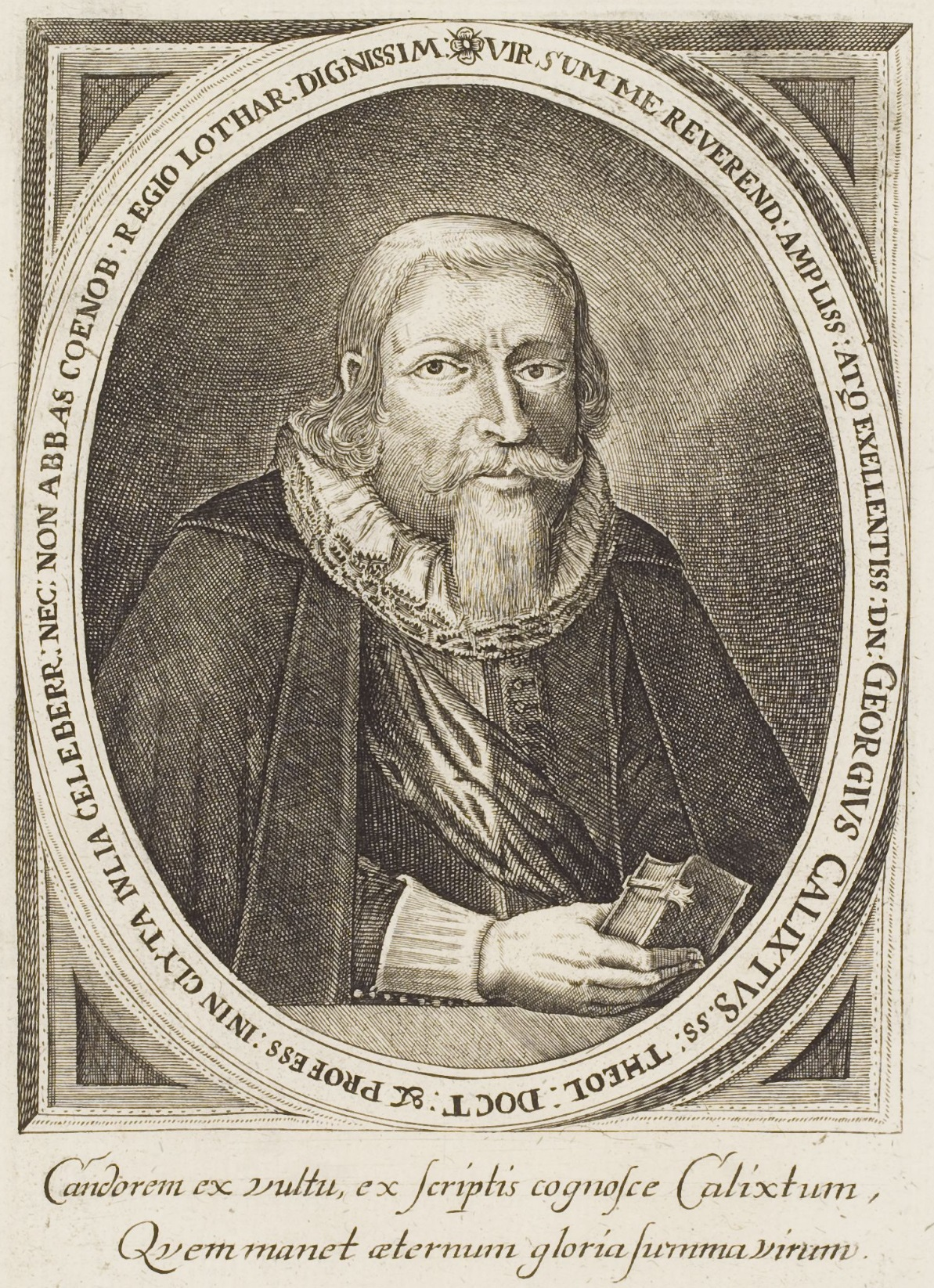
- Georg Calixtus
- Born: 14 December 1586
- Died: 19 March 1656 (aged 69)
- Occupation: Lutheran theologian

Georg Calixtus, Kallisøn/Kallisön, or Callisen (14 December 1586 – 19 March 1656) was a German Lutheran theologian who looked to reconcile all Christendom by removing all differences that he deemed "unimportant".

== Biography ==
Calixtus was born in Medelby, Schleswig. After studying philology, philosophy and theology at Helmstedt, Jena, Giessen, Tübingen and Heidelberg, he travelled through Holland, France and England, where he became acquainted with the leading reformers. On his return in 1614, he was appointed professor of theology at Helmstedt by the duke of Brunswick, who had admired the ability he displayed when a young man in a dispute with the Jesuit Augustine Turrianus.

Learning different Protestant and Roman Catholic teachings, he tried to create a "unifying theology". In 1613 he published a book, Disputationes de Praecipuis Religionis Christianae Capitibus, which provoked the hostile criticism of orthodox Lutheran scholars; in 1619 he published his Epitome theologiae, and some years later his Theologia Moralis (1634) and De Arte Nova Nihusii. Roman Catholics felt them to be aimed at their own system, but they gave so great offence to Lutherans as to induce Statius Buscher to charge the author with a secret leaning to Catholicism.

Scarcely had he refuted the accusation of Buscher, when, on account of his intimacy with the Reformed divines at the conference of Thorn (1645), and his desire to effect a reconciliation between them and the Lutherans, a new charge was leveled against him, principally by Abraham Calovius (1612-1686), of a secret attachment to Calvinism.

Thus the great aim of his life to reconcile Christendom by removing all unimportant differences, resulted in him being accused of syncretism for the ecumenical spirit in which he treated both Catholics and Calvinists, and for considering the Apostles' Creed a broad enough basis for Christian union and communion, which might embrace both. The disputes to which his attitude gave rise lasted during his whole lifetime.

His friends, however, stood by him, and he retained the position he held in the Lutheran Church, teaching theology at the University of Helmstedt until his death. For all of the legitimate controversy surrounding him, he continues to be recognized for his emphasis on the desire for the unity of Christianity.

Calixtus died in Helmstedt.

The term Consensus Quinquesaecularis, initially a contemptuous reference to the high value which Calixtus placed on an alleged consensus of the Church Fathers of the first five centuries of Christendom, and certainly a key aspect of his "unifying theology", later became popular with various old High Church divines such as some Anglican Latitudinarians.

== Works ==
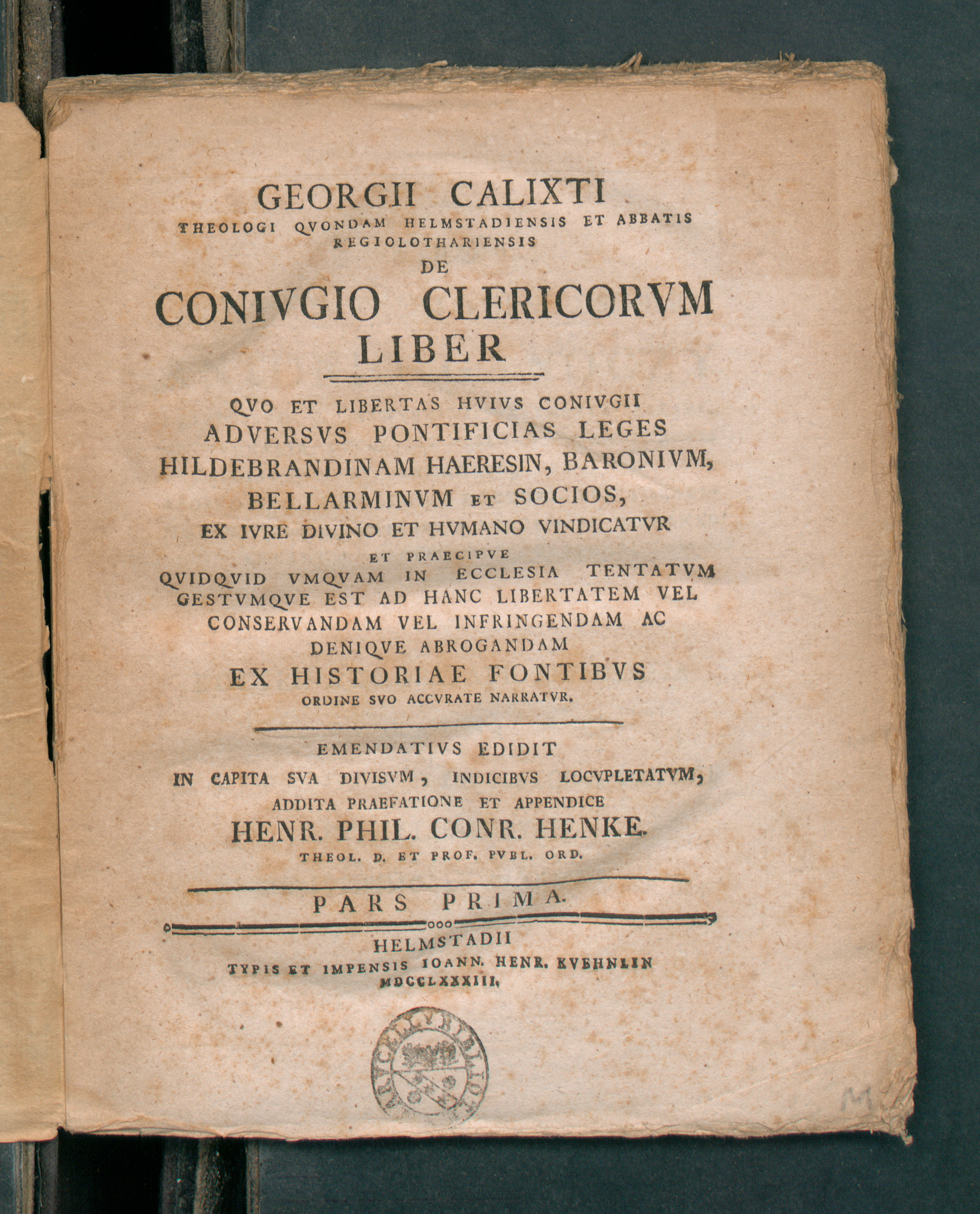
De coniugio clericorum, 1783

Modern editions of selected works are available in Georg Calixt, Werke in Auswahl, 4 vols, ed. Inge Mager (Göttingen: Vandenhoeck & Ruprecht, 1970–82).

- De praecipuis Christianae religionis capitibus hodie controversis disputationes XV Helmstedt, 1613
- Epitome Theologiae Goslar, 1619
- De vera christiana religione et ecclesia Helmstedt, 1633

== See also ==
- John Musæus
