= List of Christian creeds =

Christianity has, throughout Church history, produced a number of Christian creeds, confessions and statements of faith. The following lists are provided.

In many cases, individual churches will address further doctrinal questions in a set of bylaws. Smaller churches see this as a formality, while churches of a larger size build this to be a large document describing the practical functioning of the church.

== Biblical creeds ==
- Jesus is Lord (Romans 10:9; 1 Corinthians 12:3)
- Pre-New Testament Creeds in the New Testament (1 Timothy 2:5, Phil 2:6-11, 1 Timothy 3:16)
- Christ died, was raised, then list of eyewitnesses to the resurrection (1 Corinthians 15:3-10)

== Ecumenical and historic Christian creeds ==
Creed	Date	Accepted by	Original name	Notes	Link to text
Apostles' Creed	120–250	Western Church	Lat.: Symbolum Apostolorum or Symbolum Apostolicum	Product of the Roman Christians around AD 180, who developed an early form of the Apostles' Creed, possibly to critique Marcion.	"Apostles' Creed".
Creed of Nicaea	325	Ecumenical Church	Greek: Σύμβολον τῆς Νικαίας or, τῆς πίστεως, Latin: Symbolum Nicaenum	Product of the first ecumenical council in Nicaea which tried to solve the Arian controversy.	"Creed of Nicaea".
Nicene Creed (Nicaea-Constantinopolitan Creed)	381	Ecumenical Church		Expansion and revision of the 325 Creed of Nicaea (includes new section on Holy Spirit). It is the most widely accepted Christian creed. It critiques apollinarism and a later addition, the Filioque clause, resulted in disagreement between Eastern Christianity and Western Christianity.	"Nicene Creed".
Chalcedonian Creed	451	Council of Chalcedon	Latin: Concilium Chalcedonense	In response to Nestorian teachings, the Chalcedonian formulation defines that Christ is "acknowledged in two natures", which "come together into one person and one hypostasis". Accepted by nearly all Christian denominations (except Oriental Orthodoxy, the Assyrian Church of the East, and much of Restorationism).	"Chalcedonian Creed".
Athanasian Creed	500	Western Christian denominations	Lat.: Quicumque vult	The origin of this creed is uncertain, but it is widely used in various Christian denominations.	"Athanasian Creed".

== Creeds of the early church ==
- The Didache (50–100)
- The Creed of Aristides of Athens (130)
- The Old Roman Symbol or Old Roman Creed (c. 215)
- The Creed of Cyprian of Carthage (250)
- The Deir Balyzeh Papyrus (200–350)
- The Arian Creeds and Creeds of Euzoius (320/327)
- The Creed of Alexander of Alexandria (321–324)
- The First Synod of Antioch (325)
- The original Nicene Creed, first adopted at the First Council of Nicaea in 325.
- The Second Dedication of Antioch (341)
- The Baptismal Creed of Jerusalem (350)
- The Apostolic Constitutions (350–380)

== Interdenominational creeds ==
- Barmen Declaration of Faith, Confessing Church (1934)
- World Evangelical Alliance Statement of Faith (1951)
- National Association of Evangelicals Statement of Faith (1943)
- Anglican-Lutheran Pullach Report (1972)
- Brief Statement of Faith (1983)
- Common Christological Declarations Between the Catholic Church and the Assyrian Church of the East (1994)

== Ecumenical creeds ==
- The Call to Unity, Lausanne (1927)
- The Scheme of Union of the Church of South India (1929/1942)
- The Grace of our Lord Jesus Christ, Edinburgh (1937)
- Affirmation of Union, Edinburgh (1937)
- The Constitution of the Church in South India (1947)
- Message of the First Assembly of the World Council of Churches (1948)
- The Unity We Have and Seek (1952)
- A Message from the Second Assembly of the World Council of Churches (1954)
- The Unity of the Church, St. Andrews (1960)
- The Church's Unity, World Council of Churches, New Delhi (1961)
- The Holy Spirit and the Catholicity of the Church, Uppsala (1968)
- What Unity Requires, Nairobi (1975)
- Baptism, Eucharist, and Ministry, Lima (1982)
- Uniatism, Method of Union of the Past, and the Present Search for Full Communion (1993)
- The Covenant (2015)

== Denominational creeds ==
=== Adventist ===
- Pillars of Adventism (1848)
- Adventist Baptismal Vow (1941)
- 28 Fundamental Beliefs (Adventist) (1980)

=== African Orthodox Church ===
- Doctrine of the African Orthodox Church (1921)

=== Anabaptist ===
- Hans Denck's confession Before the Council of Nuremberg (1525)
- The Schleitheim Confession (1527)
- The Mennonite Concept of Cologne (1591)
- Dordrecht Confession of Faith (1632)

=== Anglican ===
- The Anglican Catechism (1549/1662)
- Thirty-Nine Articles (1563)
- Lambeth Articles (1595)
- Affirmation of St. Louis (1977)

=== Remonstrant ===
- Five Articles of Remonstrance (1610)
- The Opinions of the Remonstrants (1618)
- Remonstrant Confession (1621)

=== Assemblies of God ===
- Assemblies of God Statement of Fundamental Truths
- Assembleia de deus Declaration of faith - Brazil

=== Baptist ===
- Helwys Declaration of Faith (1611)
- First London Confession of Faith (1644)
- Standard Confession of Faith (1660)
- Second London Confession of Faith (1677/1689)
- Orthodox Creed (1679)
- Philadelphia Confession of Faith (1742)
- New Hampshire Confession of Faith (1833)
- The Free-will Baptist Confession (1868)
- Abstract Principles for Southern Baptist Seminary (1858)
- The Doctrinal Basis of the New Zealand Baptist Union (1882)
- Doctrinal Basis of the Baptist Union of Victoria, Australia (1888)
- The Statement of the Baptist Union of Great Britain and Ireland (1888)
- The Statement of Faith of the American Baptist Association (1905)
- Johann Kargel's Confession (1913)
- Baptist Faith and Message, Southern Baptist Convention (1925)
- The Doctrinal Statement of the North American Baptist Association (1950)
- Baptist Faith and Message, Southern Baptist Convention (1964)
- Baptist Affirmation of Faith, Strict Baptist Assembly (1966)
- Romanian Baptist Confession (1974)
- The Statement of Beliefs of the North American Baptist Conference (1982)
- Baptist Faith and Message, Southern Baptist Convention (2000)

=== Catholic ===
- The Edict of Michael Cerularius and of the Synod of Constantinople of 1054 (1054)
- The Dictatus Papae of Pope Gregory VII (1075)
- Council of Florence
- Confutatio Augustana (1530)
- Tridentine Creed - Profession of Faith of Pius IV (1564)
- Anti-Modernist Oath - Pius X
- Maasai Creed, Holy Ghost Fathers (1960)
- Vatican II Council, Dogmatic Constitution on the Church (1964)
- Credo of the People of God Profession of Faith of Paul VI (1968)
- Common Declaration of Pope John Paul II and [Armenian] Catholicos Karekin I (1996)
- Ad Tuendam Fidem of Pope John Paul II (1998)

=== Christian Church (Disciples of Christ) ===
- Mission, Vision and Confession
- Christian Church: The Design for the Christian Church (1968)

=== Congregational ===
- Cambridge Platform (1648)
- Savoy Declaration (1658)
- The Declaration of the Congregational Union of England (1833)
- The Declaration of the Boston National Council (1865)
- The Declaration of the Oberlin National Council (1871)
- The "Commission" Creed of the Congregational Church (1883/1913)

=== Continental Reformed ===
- Heidelberg Catechism (1563)

Dutch

- Belgic Confession (1561)
- Canons of Dordt (1618–19)
- Walcheren Articles (1693)
- Belhar Confession, Dutch Reformed Mission Church (1986)

Huguenot

- Guanabara Confession of Faith (1558)
- Gallican Confession (1559)

Hungarian

- The Hungarian Confession (1570)

Swiss

- The Sixty-seven Articles of Ulrigh Zwingli (1523) (Zwinglian)
- Ten Conclusions of Berne (1528)
- First Helvetic Confession (1536)
- The Consensus of Geneva (1552)
- Second Helvetic Confession (1586)
- Helvetic Consensus (1675)

=== Eastern Orthodox ===
- Confession of Saint Peter Mogila (1643)
- Confession of Dositheus (1672)

=== Lutheran ===
- Augsburg Confession (1520)
- The Evangelical Counsel of Ansbach (1524)
- Marburg Articles (1529)
- Augsburg Confession (1530)
- Apology of the Augsburg Confession (1530 Lutheran Response to Confutatio Augustana)
- Smalcald Articles (1537)
- Treatise on the Power and Primacy of the Pope (1537)
- Formula of Concord (1577)
- Book of Concord (1580)
- Saxon Visitation Articles (1592)
- The Reaffirmed Consensus of the True Lutheran Faith (1655)

=== Methodist ===
- Minutes of Some Late Conversations (1744)
- The Scripture Way of Salvation (1765)
- Articles of Religion (1784)
- Confession of Faith, United Methodist Church (1968)
- Soldier's Covenant of the Salvation Army, a church created by former Methodists

=== Moravian ===
- The three Ecumenical Creeds: Apostles', Nicene and Athanasian
- The Augsburg Confession
- The Confession of the Unity of the Bohemian Brethren of 1535
- Bohemian Confession
- The Barmen Declaration of 1934

=== Pentecostal ===
- Assemblies of God Statement of Fundamental Truths (1916)
- Indian Pentecostal Church of God: Statement of Faith

=== Presbyterian ===
- Scots Confession (1560)
- King's Confession (1581)
- Westminster Confession of Faith (1646)
- The Confession of the Waldenses (1655)
- The Confession of the Cumberland Presbyterian Church (1814/1883)
- The Confession of the Free Evangelical Church of Geneva (1848)
- The Confession of the Free Italian Church (1870)
- The Auburn Declaration (1837)
- Auburn Affirmation (PCUSA) (1924)
- Book of Confessions (PCUSA)[part 1; Second Edition 1970]
- The Creed of the Evangelical Presbyterian Church of Chile (1983)
- Living Faith: A statement of Christian Belief, Presbyterian Church in Canada (1984)

=== Quaker ===
- The Confession of the Society of Friends (1675)
- Richmond Declaration (1887)

=== Other Reformed ===
- Irish Articles of Religion (1615), for the Anglican Church of Ireland
- Confession of Cyril Lucaris (1629), for the Eastern Orthodox Church
- Calvinistic Methodist Confession of Faith (1823)

=== Unitarian ===
- Consensus Ministrorum (1579)
- Racovian Catechism (1605)
- Complanatio Deesiana (1638)
- A Digest of Christian Theology according to the Unitarians (1782)

=== United Church of Canada ===
- A New Creed (1968)

=== United Church of Christ ===
- Statement of Faith of the United Church of Christ (1959/1977)

=== Waldensian ===
- Waldensian Confession (1655)

== Creeds of specific movements ==
=== Neo-Evangelical ===
- Doctrinal Statement of the Evangelical Theological Society (1949, 1990)
- Chicago Statement on Biblical Inerrancy (1978)
- Chicago Statement on Biblical Hermeneutics (1982)
- Danvers Statement (1988)

=== Alliance of Confessing Evangelicals ===
- Cambridge Declaration (1996)

== See also ==
- Church covenant

== Bibliography ==
- Kelly, John N. D. (2006) [1972]. Early Christian Creeds (3rd ed.). London-New York: Continuum. ISBN 9780826492166.
- Ritter, Adolf Martin (1965). Das Konzil von Konstantinopel und sein Symbol: Studien zur Geschichte und Theologie des II. Ökumenischen Konzils. Göttingen: Vandenhoeck & Ruprecht. ISBN 9783666551185.
- DeJong, Peter (1968). "The Opinions of the Remonstrants (1618)". Crisis in the Reformed Churches: Essays in Commemoration of the Great Synod of Dordt, 1618-1619 (PDF). Grand Rapids: Reformed Fellowship.
