= Theology of Martin Luther =

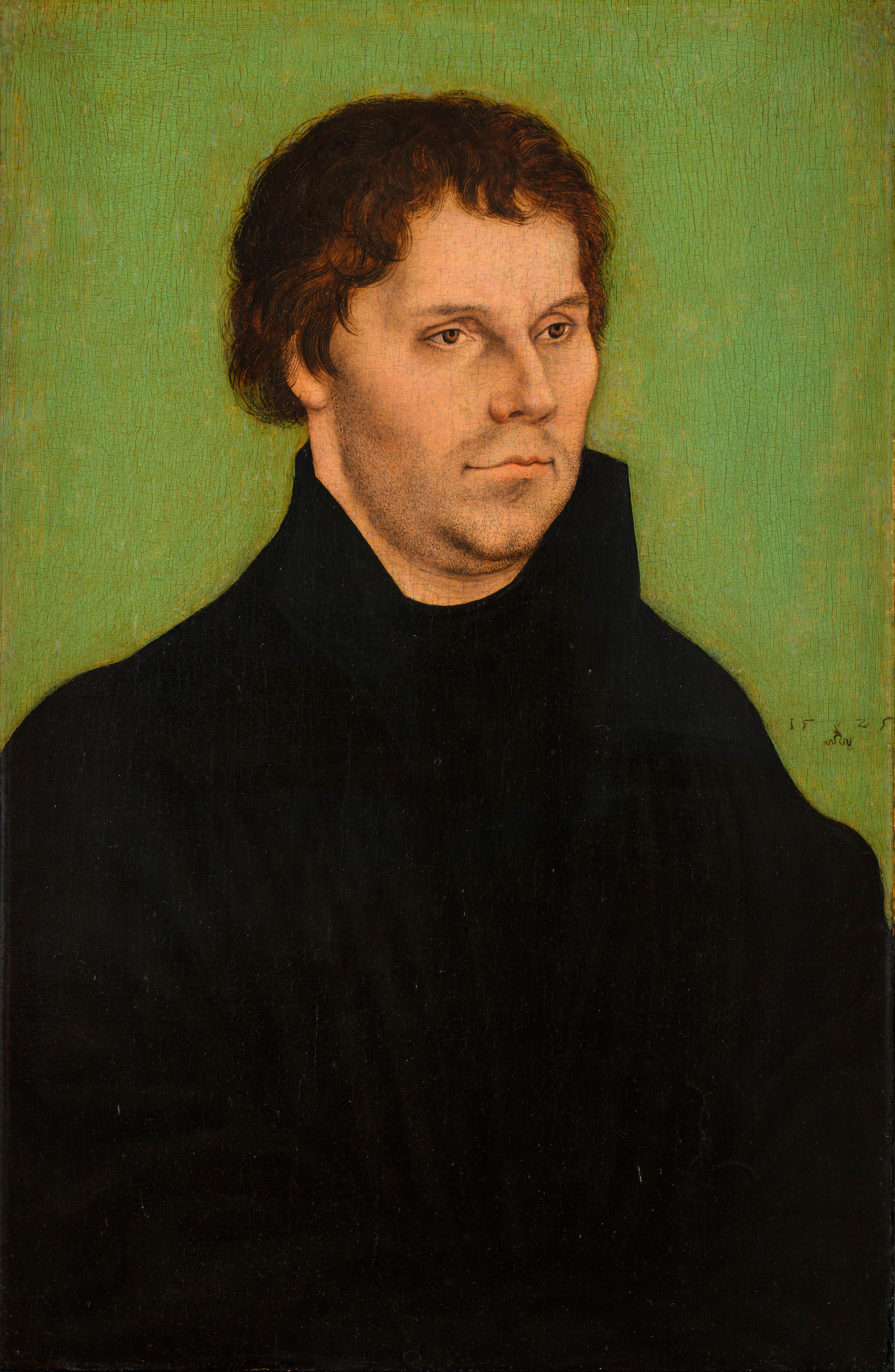
Martin Luther

The theology of Martin Luther was instrumental in influencing the Protestant Reformation, specifically topics dealing with justification by faith, the relationship between the Law and Gospel (also an instrumental component of Reformed theology), and various other theological ideas. Although Luther never wrote a systematic theology or a "summa" in the style of St. Thomas Aquinas, many of his ideas were systematized in the Lutheran Confessions.

== Soteriology ==
In the centuries leading up to the Reformation, an "Augustinian Renaissance" revived interest in the thought of Augustine of Hippo (354-430). Augustine is widely regarded as the most influential patristic figure for the Reformation. Martin Luther, an Augustinian friar, rooted his theology of salvation deeply in Augustinian soteriology, alongside Huldrych Zwingli (1484–1531), and John Calvin (1509–1564). Augustine's theology was grounded in divine monergism, and implied a double predestination. Similarly, Luther's vision centered also on divine monergism, strictly applied to soteriological aspects. He affirmed that God governed both election to salvation and reprobation.

== Justification by faith ==
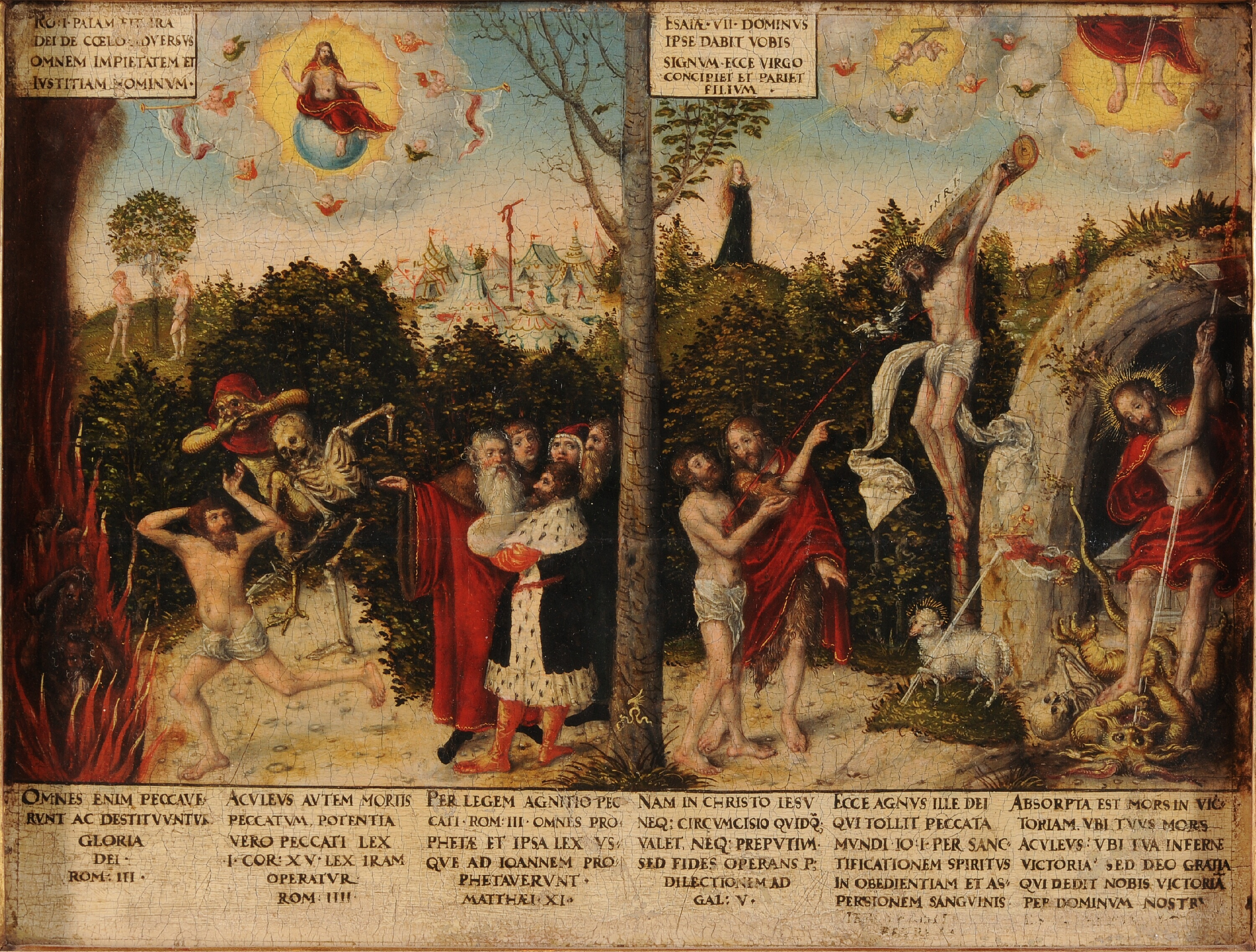
A painting by Lucas Cranach on Lutheran teachings, Lutherhaus

"This one and firm rock, which we call the doctrine of justification," insisted Luther, "is the chief article of the whole Christian doctrine, which comprehends the understanding of all godliness." Lutherans tend to follow Luther in this matter. For the Lutheran tradition, the doctrine of salvation by grace alone through faith alone in Christ alone is the material principle upon which all other teachings rest.

Luther came to understand justification as being entirely the work of God. Against the teaching of his day that the believers are made righteous through the infusion of God's grace into the soul, Luther asserted that Christians receive that righteousness entirely from outside themselves; that righteousness not only comes from Christ, it actually is the righteousness of Christ, and remains outside of us but is merely imputed to us (rather than infused into us) through faith. "That is why faith alone makes someone just and fulfills the law," said Luther. "Faith is that which brings the Holy Spirit through the merits of Christ". Thus faith, for Luther, is a gift from God, and ". . .a living, bold trust in God's grace, so certain of God's favor that it would risk death a thousand times trusting in it." This faith grasps Christ's righteousness and appropriates it for itself in the believer's heart.

Luther's study and research led him to question the contemporary usage of terms such as penance and righteousness in the Roman Catholic Church. He became convinced that the church had lost sight of what he saw as several of the central truths of Christianity — the most important being the doctrine of justification by faith alone. He began to teach that salvation is a gift of God's grace through Christ received by faith alone. As a result of his lectures on the Psalms and Paul the Apostle's Epistle to the Romans, from 1513–1516, Luther "achieved an exegetical breakthrough, an insight into the all-encompassing grace of God and all-sufficient merit of Christ." It was particularly in connection with Romans 1:17 "For therein is the righteousness of God revealed from faith, to faith: as it is written: 'The just shall live by faith.'" Luther came to one of his most important understandings, that the "righteousness of God" was not God's active, harsh, punishing wrath demanding that a person keep God's law perfectly in order to be saved, but rather Luther came to believe that God's righteousness is something that God gives to a person as a gift, freely, through Christ. "Luther emerged from his tremendous struggle with a firmer trust in God and love for him. The doctrine of salvation by God's grace alone, received as a gift through faith and without dependence on human merit, was the measure by which he judged the religious practices and official teachings of the church of his day and found them wanting."

Luther explained justification this way in his Smalcald Articles:

The first and chief article is this: Jesus Christ, our God and Lord, died for our sins and was raised again for our justification (Romans 3:24-25). He alone is the Lamb of God who takes away the sins of the world (John 1:29), and God has laid on Him the iniquity of us all (Isaiah 53:6). All have sinned and are justified freely, without their own works and merits, by His grace, through the redemption that is in Christ Jesus, in His blood (Romans 3:23-25). This is necessary to believe. This cannot be otherwise acquired or grasped by any work, law, or merit. Therefore, it is clear and certain that this faith alone justifies us...Nothing of this article can be yielded or surrendered, even though heaven and earth and everything else falls (Mark 13:31).

=== New Finnish School critique ===
Finnish scholarship in recent years has presented a distinctive view of Luther. Tuomo Mannermaa at the University of Helsinki led "The New Finnish Interpretation of Luther" that presents Luther's views on salvation in terms much closer to the Eastern Orthodox doctrine of theosis rather than established interpretations of German Luther scholarship.

Mannermaa's student Olli-Pekka Vainio has argued that Luther and other Lutherans in the sixteenth century (especially theologians who later wrote the Formula of Concord) continued to define justification as participation in Christ rather than simply forensic imputation. Vainio concludes that the Lutheran doctrine of justification can deny merit to human actions, "only if the new life given to the sinner is construed as participation in the divine Life in Christ. . . . The faith that has Christ as its object, and which apprehends Him and His merit, making Him present as the form of faith, is reckoned as righteousness".

The Finnish approach argues that it is due to a much later interpretation of Luther that he is popularly known as centering his doctrine of human salvation in the belief that people are saved by the imputation to them of a righteousness not their own, Christ's own ("alien") righteousness. This is known as the theological doctrine of forensic justification. Rather, the Finnish School asserts that Luther's doctrine of salvation was similar to that of Eastern Orthodoxy, theosis (divinization). The Finnish language is deliberately borrowed from the Greek Orthodox tradition, and thus it reveals the intention and context of this theological enterprise: it is an attempt by Lutherans to find common ground with Orthodoxy, an attempt launched amid the East-West détente of the 1970s, but taking greater impetus in a post-1989 world as such dialogue appears much more urgent for churches around the Baltic.

The New Finnish Interpretation has been challenged because it ignores Luther's roots and theological development in Western Christendom, and it characterizes Luther's teaching on Justification as based on Jesus Christ's righteousness which indwells the believer rather than his righteousness as imputed to the believer. Kolb and Arand (2008) argue that, "These views ignore the radically different metaphysical base of Luther's understanding and that of the Eastern church, and they ignore Luther's understanding of the dynamic, re-creative nature of God's Word." In the anthology Union with Christ: The New Finnish Interpretation of Luther the topic of Osiandrianism is addressed because the Finnish School is perceived as a repristination of Andreas Osiander's doctrine of salvation through Christ's indwelling the believer with his divine nature.

== Law and Gospel ==
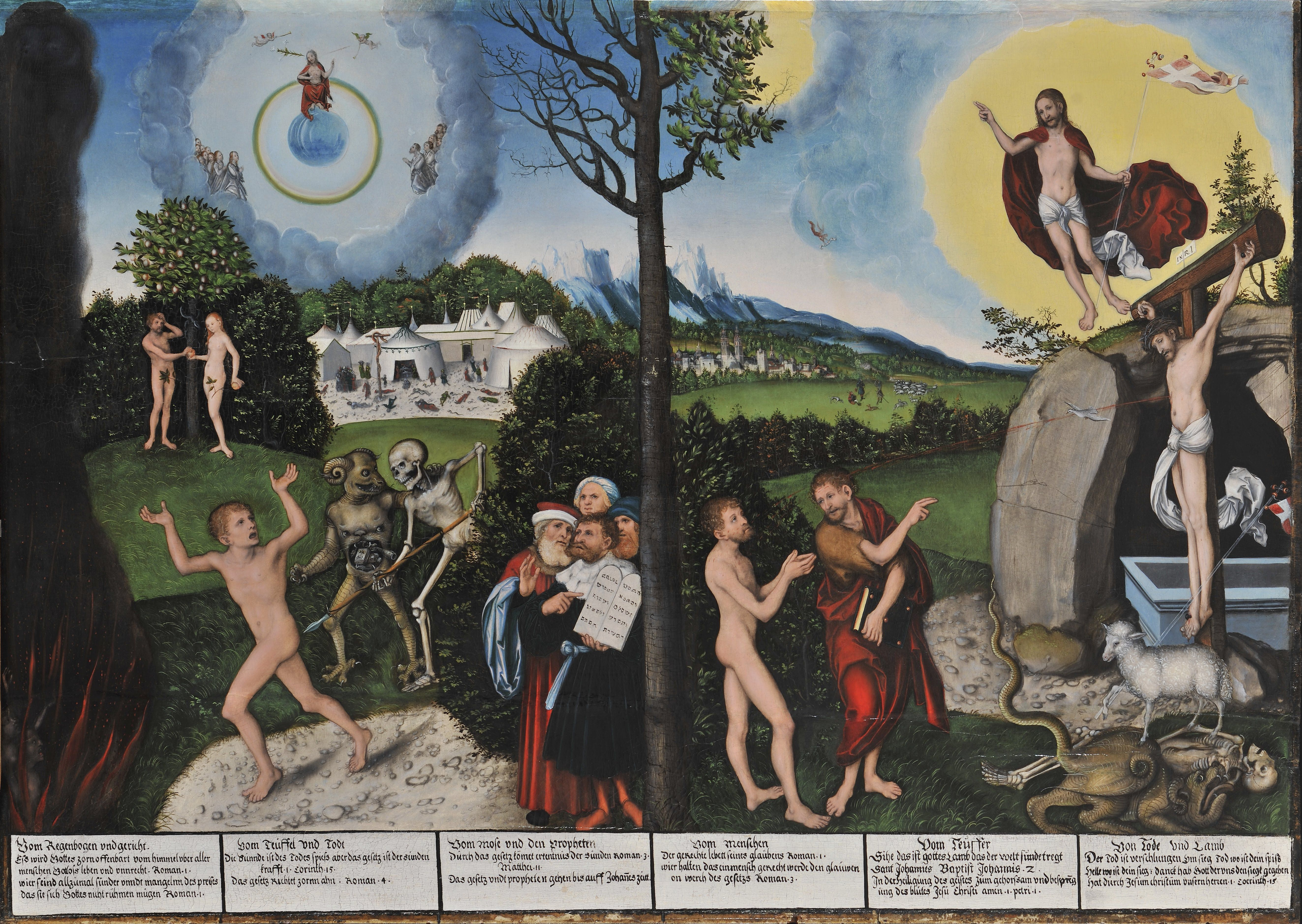
Law and Grace painting by Lucas Cranach

Another essential aspect of his theology was his emphasis on the "proper distinction" between Law and Gospel. He believed that this principle of interpretation was an essential starting point in the study of the scriptures and that failing to distinguish properly between Law and Gospel was at the root of many fundamental theological errors.

== Universal priesthood of the baptized ==
Luther developed his expositions of the "universal priesthood of believers" from New Testament scripture. Through his studies, Luther recognized that the hierarchical division of Christians into clergy and laity, stood in contrast to the Apostle Peter's teaching (1Peter 2:1-10).

. . . ^{9}But you are a chosen race, a royal priesthood, a holy nation, a people for his own possession, that you may proclaim the excellencies of him who called you out of darkness into his marvelous light. ^{10}Once you were not a people, but now you are God’s people; once you had not received mercy, but now you have received mercy.

== Simul justus et peccator ==
(Latin simul, "simultaneous" + Latin justus, "righteous" + Latin et, "and" + Latin peccator, "sinner") Roman Catholic theology maintains that baptism washes away original sin. However, "concupiscence" remains as an inclination to sin, which is not sin unless actualized. Luther and the Reformers insisted that what was called "concupiscence" was actually sin. While not denying the validity of baptism, Luther maintains that the inclination to sin is truly sin.

Simul justus et peccator means that a Christian is at the same time both righteous and a sinner. Human beings are justified by grace alone, but at the same time they will always remain sinners, even after baptism. The doctrine can be interpreted in two different ways. From the perspective of God, human beings are at the same time totally sinners and totally righteous in Christ (totus/totus). However, it would also be possible to argue that human beings are partly sinful and partly righteous (partim/partim). The doctrine of simul justus is not an excuse for lawlessness, or a license for continued sinful conduct; rather, properly understood, it comforts the person who truly wishes to be free from sin and is aware of the inner struggle within him. Romans 7 is the key biblical passage for understanding this doctrine.

Luther also does not deny that the Christian may ever "improve" in his conduct. Instead, he wishes to keep Christians from either relying upon or despairing because of their own conduct or attitude.

18th century philosopher Immanuel Kant's doctrine of radical evil has been described as an adaptation of the Lutheran simul justus et peccator.

== Two Kingdoms ==
Martin Luther's doctrine of the two kingdoms (or two reigns) of God teaches that God is the ruler of the whole world and that he rules in two ways, both by the law and by the gospel.

God rules the earthly kingdom through secular government, by means of law and the sword. As creator, God would like to promote social justice, and this is done through the political use of the law. At the same time, God rules his spiritual kingdom in order to promote human righteousness before God. This is done through the gospel, according to which all humans are justified by God's grace alone.

This distinction has in Lutheran theology often been related to the idea that there is no particular Christian contribution to political and economic ethics. Human reason is enough to understand what is a right act in political and economic life. The gospel does not give any contribution to the content of social ethics. From this perspective Lutheran theology has often supported those in political and economic power.

== Geocentrism ==
Luther is credited with supporting the traditional geocentrism reflected in Joshua 10:10-15.

== On missiology ==
Luther's teaching on overseas mission is essentially in line with the ideas of the Reformation. It is primarily characterised by the idea of the powerful word of God. Sent out by God, the gospel had been spread worldwide through the preaching of the Apostles: "This has also happened, that the gospel has been preached and thereby the kingdom of Christ has been greatly established in every place under heaven.“ The course of the gospel also takes place in post-apostolic times, gathering people all over the world to the kingdom of Christ up to the Last Judgement.

An organised missionary work, Luther added, is no longer necessary, especially since the apostolate and the accompanying vocation to world mission (Matthew 28:18-20) no longer exist. Nevertheless, when circumstances require it, every Christian is charged with missionary witness: "Christians should also produce much fruit through the word among all the Gentiles, convert many and save them, so that they should spread around them like a fire."

== Demonology ==
Luther continued a tradition of Christian engagement with the demonic from his medieval predecessors. For instance, during his Table Talks, he references Mechthild of Magdeburg's The Flowing Light of the Godhead, an example of the pre-reformation piety which Luther was immersed in that associate the Devil with excrement. Luther references Mechtihild's work, suggesting that those in a state of mortal sin are eventually excreted by the Devil. Joseph Smith states that Luther's advice regarding the Devil, is "that one should address the devil as such" quoting:

"Devil, I also shat into my pants, did you smell it, and did you record it with my others sins?’ (Tischreden 261,b)

Other instances include him rehearsing medieval scatalogical limericks:

Devil: You monk on the latrine,
you may not read the matins here!

Monk: I am cleansing my bowels
and worshipping God Almighty;
You deserve what descends
and God what ascends."

He separately states:

Reader, be commended to God, and pray for the increase of preaching against Satan. For he is powerful and wicked, today more dangerous than ever before because he knows that he has only a short time left to rage.

== See also ==
- Apology of the Augsburg Confession
- Augsburg Confession
- Book of Concord
- Criticism of Protestantism
- Formula of Concord
- Luther's Large Catechism
- Luther's Small Catechism
- Lutheran Mariology
- List of hymns by Martin Luther
- Sacramental union
- Treatise on the Power and Primacy of the Pope

== Notes and references ==
=== Sources ===
- Akin, Daniel L.; Dockery, David S.; Finn, Nathan A. (2023). A Handbook of Theology. Brentwood, TN: B&H Publishing Group.
- Barrett, Matthew (2013). Salvation by Grace: The Case for Effectual Calling and Regeneration. Phillipsburg: P & R Publishing.
- George, T. (1988). Theology of the Reformers. Nashville: Broadman Press.
- Horton, Michael (2011). The Christian Faith: A Systematic Theology for Pilgrims on the Way. Grand Rapids, MI (US): Zondervan Academic.
- James, Frank A. (1998). Peter Martyr Vermigli and Predestination: The Augustinian Inheritance of an Italian Reformer. Oxford: Clarendon.
- McMahon, C. Matthew (2012). Augustine's Calvinism: The Doctrines of Grace in Augustine's Writings. Coconut Creek, FL: Puritan Publications.
- Pelikan, Jaroslav (1987). "An Augustinian Dilemma: Augustine's Doctrine of Grace versus Augustine's Doctrine of the Church?". Augustinian Studies. 18: 1–28. doi:10.5840/augstudies1987186.
- Sammons, Peter (2020). Reprobation: from Augustine to the Synod of Dort: The Historical Development of the Reformed Doctrine of Reprobation. Gottingen: Vandenhoeck & Ruprecht.
- Stephens, W.P. (1986). The Theology of Huldrych Zwingli. Oxford: Clarendon Press.
- Straton, Timothy A. (2020). Human Freedom, Divine Knowledge, and Mere Molinism: A Biblical, Historical, Theological, and Philosophical Analysis. Eugene, OR: Wipf and Stock Publishers.
