= Schmalkald =

Schmalkald can refer to:

- Schmalkalden - a town in Germany
- Smalcald Articles - a summary of Lutheran doctrine (1537)
- Schmalkaldic League - an alliance of Lutheran princes during mid-16th century
- Schmalkaldic War - war between Schmalkadic League and Charles V of Habsburg
