= Voegelin =

Voegelin or Vögelin is a surname. Notable people with the surname include:

- Charles F. Voegelin (1906–1986), American linguist and anthropologist, husband to Erminie and Florence
- Eric Voegelin (1901–1985), American philosopher
- Erminie Wheeler-Voegelin (1903–1988), American anthropologist, first wife of Charles F. Voegelin
- Ernst Vögelin (1529–1589), German book printer
- Florence M. Voegelin (1927–1989), American anthropologist, second wife of Charles F. Voegelin
