= Divinization (Christian) =

Transforming effect of divine grace

In Christian theology, divinization ("divinization" may also refer to apotheosis, lit. "making divine"), or theopoesis or theosis, is the transforming effect of divine grace, the spirit of God, or the atonement of Christ. Although it literally means to become divine, or to become God, most modern Christian denominations do not interpret the doctrine as implying an overcoming of a fundamental ontological difference between God and humanity; for example, John of the Cross (AD 1542–1591) indicated that while "God communicates to it [the individual soul] His supernatural Being, in such wise that it appears to be God Himself, and has all that God Himself has", yet "it is true that its natural being, though thus transformed, is as distinct from the Being of God as it was before".

== Patristic writings ==
The term theosis was originally used in Greco-Roman pagan society to venerate a ruler. It was inconceivable to Jewish piety. Yet it was adopted in Eastern Christianity by the Greek Fathers to describe the spiritual transformation of a Christian. The change of human nature was understood by them as a consequence of a baptized person being incorporated into the Church as the Body of Christ. Divinization was thus developed within the context of incarnational theology.

The teaching about deification of a Christian can be found as early as in the works of Irenaeus (c. 130–202), a Greek Father who is also known as the Father of Catholic theology, and who was bishop of the church of Lyon in France. For example, in the preface to his apologetic work Adversus Haereses (Against Heresies) vol. 5, Irenaeus states that "[T]he Word of God, our Lord Jesus Christ ... did, through His transcendent love, become what we are, that He might bring us to be even what He is Himself"." Athanasius of Alexandria was an author of the phrase about Jesus Christ which has become popular in Christmas homilies: "He was made human so that he might make us sons of God" (De incarnatione 54,3, cf. Contra Arianos 1.39). Divinization in the context of the Eucharist was taught by Gregory of Nyssa and Cyril of Alexandria. The term never meant for them breaching the absolute ontological distinction between God and his creation.

There were many different references to divinization in the writings of the Church Fathers.

As previously noted, in the second century, Irenaeus, bishop of Lyon (c. 130–202) said that the Word Jesus Christ had "become what we are, that He might bring us to be even what He is Himself." He added:

Do we cast blame on him [God] because we were not made gods from the beginning, but were at first created merely as men, and then later as gods? Although God has adopted this course out of his pure benevolence, that no one may charge him with discrimination or stinginess, he declares, "I have said, Ye are gods; and all of you are sons of the Most High." ... For it was necessary at first that nature be exhibited, then after that what was mortal would be conquered and swallowed up in immortality.

At about the same time, Clement of Alexandria (c. 150–215), wrote: "Yea, I say, the Word of God became a man so that you might learn from a man how to become a god." Clement further stated that "[i]f one knows himself, he will know God, and knowing God will become like God. . . . His is beauty, true beauty, for it is God, and that man becomes a god, since God wills it. So Heraclitus was right when he said, 'Men are gods, and gods are men.'" Clement of Alexandria also stated that "he who obeys the Lord and follows the prophecy given through him ... becomes a god while still moving about in the flesh."

Justin Martyr (c. 100–165) insisted that in the beginning men "were made like God, free from suffering and death," and that they are thus "deemed worthy of becoming gods and of having power to become sons of the highest."

Athanasius, bishop of Alexandria (c. 296–373), stated his belief in literal deification: "The Word was made flesh in order that we might be made gods. ... Just as the Lord, putting on the body, became a man, so also we men are both deified through his flesh, and henceforth inherit everlasting life." Athanasius also observed: "For the Son of God became man so that we might become God."

Augustine of Hippo (354–430) said: "But he himself that justifies also deifies, for by justifying he makes sons of God. 'For he has given them power to become the sons of God' [referring to John 1:12]. If then we have been made sons of god, we have also been made gods." "To make human beings gods," Augustine said, "He was made man who was God" (sermon 192.1.1). Augustine goes on to write that "[they] are not born of His Substance, that they should be the same as He, but that by favour they should come to Him... (Ibid)".

Other references to divinization in the writings of the Church Fathers include the following:

- Irenaeus (c. 130-200)
  - "[T]he Word of God, our Lord Jesus Christ, who did, through His transcendent love, become what we are, that He might bring us to be even what He is Himself."
  - "'For we cast blame upon [God], because we have not been made gods from the beginning, but at first merely men, then at length gods; although God has adopted this course out of His pure benevolence, that no one may impute to Him invidiousness or grudgingness he declares, "I have said, Ye are gods; and all of you are sons of the Most High." "
  - "For it was necessary, at first, that nature should be exhibited; then, after that, that what was mortal should be conquered and swallowed up by immortality, and the corruptible by incorruptibility, and that man should be made after the image and likeness of God."
- Clement of Alexandria (c. 150-215)
  - "[T]he Word of God became man, that thou mayest learn from man how man may become God."
  - "For if one knows himself, he will know God; and knowing God, he will be made like God"
  - "[H]is is beauty, the true beauty, for it is God; and that man becomes God, since God so wills. Heraclitus, then, rightly said, "Men are gods, and gods are men." For the Word Himself is the manifest mystery: God in man, and man God"
  - "[H]e who listens to the Lord, and follows the prophecy given by Him, will be formed perfectly in the likeness of the teacher—made a god going about in flesh."
  - "And to be incorruptible is to participate in divinity..."
- Justin Martyr (c. 100-165)
  - "[Men] were made like God, free from suffering and death, provided that they kept His commandments, and were deemed deserving of the name of His sons, and yet they, becoming like Adam and Eve, work out death for themselves; let the interpretation of the Psalm be held just as you wish, yet thereby it is demonstrated that all men are deemed worthy of becoming "gods," and of having power to become sons of the Highest."
- Theophilus of Antioch (c. 120-190)
  - "For if He had made him immortal from the beginning, He would have made him God. Again, if He had made him mortal, God would seem to be the cause of his death. Neither, then, immortal nor yet mortal did He make him, but, as we have said above, capable of both; so that if he should incline to the things of immortality, keeping the commandment of God, he should receive as reward from Him immortality, and should become God..."
- Hippolytus of Rome (c. 170-235)
  - "And you shall be a companion of the Deity, and a co-heir with Christ, no longer enslaved by lusts or passions, and never again wasted by disease. For you have become God: for whatever sufferings you underwent while being a man, these He gave to you, because you were of mortal mould, but whatever it is consistent with God to impart, these God has promised to bestow upon you, because you have been deified, and begotten unto immortality."
  - "If, therefore, man has become immortal, he will also be God. And if he is made God by water and the Holy Spirit after the regeneration of the laver he is found to be also joint-heir with Christ after the resurrection from the dead."
- Athanasius of Alexandria (c. 296-373)
  - "Therefore He was not man, and then became God, but He was God, and then became man, and that to deify us"
  - "for as the Lord, putting on the body, became man, so we men are deified by the Word as being taken to Him through His flesh."
  - "For He was made man that we might be made God."
- Gregory of Nyssa (c. 335-395)
  - "Since the God who was manifested infused Himself into perishable humanity for this purpose, viz. that by this communion with Deity mankind might at the same time be deified, for this end it is that, by dispensation of His grace, He disseminated Himself in every believer."
  - "For just as He in Himself assimilated His own human nature to the power of the Godhead, being a part of the common nature, but not being subject to the inclination to sin which is in that nature (for it says: "He did no sin, nor was deceit found in his mouth), so, also, will He lead each person to union with the Godhead if they do nothing unworthy of union with the Divine."
- Augustine of Hippo (c. 354-430)
  - "'For He hath given them power to become the sons of God.' If we have been made sons of God, we have also been made gods."
- Maximus the Confessor
  - "Nothing in theosis is the product of human nature, for nature cannot comprehend God. It is only the mercy of God that has the capacity to endow theosis unto the existing... In theosis, man (the image of God) becomes likened to God, he rejoices in all the plenitude that does not belong to him by nature, because the grace of the Spirit triumphs within him, and because God acts in him."
- Cyril of Alexandria
  - "[H]e came down into our condition solely in order to lead us to his own divine state."
  - "It follows, therefore, that He Who Is, The One Who Exists, is necessarily born of the flesh, taking all that is ours into himself so that all that is born of the flesh, that is us corruptible and perishing human beings, might rest in him. In short, he took what was ours to be his very own so that we might have all that was his."
  - "For we too are sons and gods by grace, and we have surely been brought to this wonderful and supernatural dignity since we have the Only Begotten Word of God dwelling within us."
- Gregory of Nazianzus
  - implores humankind to "become gods for (God's) sake, since (God) became man for our sake.".
  - Likewise, he argues that the mediator "pleads even now as Man for my salvation; for He continues to wear the Body which He assumed, until He make me God by the power of His Incarnation."
  - "Through the medium of the mind he had dealings with the flesh, being made that God on earth, which is Man: Man and God blended. They became a single whole, the stronger side predominating, in order that I might be made God to the same extent that he was made man."
- Basil of Caesarea stated that "becoming a god is the highest goal of all"

== Eastern Orthodox ==
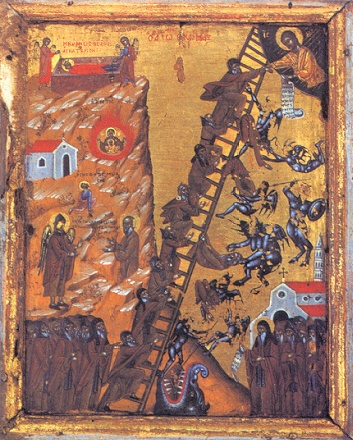
Icon of The Ladder of Divine Ascent (the steps toward theosis as described by John Climacus) showing monks ascending (and falling from) the ladder to Jesus, Saint Catherine's Monastery

The teaching of deification or theosis in Eastern Orthodoxy refers to the attainment of likeness of God, union with God or reconciliation with God. Deification has three stages in its process of transformation: katharsis, theoria, theosis. Theosis as such is the goal, it is the purpose of life, and it is considered achievable only through a synergy (or cooperation) between humans' activities and God's uncreated energies (or operations). Theosis is an important concept in Eastern Orthodox theology deriving from the fact that Eastern Orthodox theology is of an explicitly mystical character. Theology in the Eastern Orthodox Church is what is derived from saints or mystics of the tradition, and Eastern Orthodoxy considers that "no one who does not follow the path of union with God can be a theologian." In Eastern Orthodoxy, theology is not treated as an academic pursuit, but it is based on revelation (see gnosiology), meaning that Eastern Orthodox theology and its theologians are validated by ascetic pursuits, rather than academic degrees (i.e. scholasticism).

According to the Westminster Dictionary of Christian Theology, as quoted by Millet and Reynolds:

Deification (Greek theosis) is for Orthodoxy the goal of every Christian. Man, according to the Bible, is 'made in the image and likeness of God.' ... It is possible for man to become like God, to become deified, to become god by grace. This doctrine is based on many passages of both OT and NT (e.g. Ps. 82 (81).6; II Peter 1.4), and it is essentially the teaching both of St Paul, though he tends to use the language of filial adoption (cf. Rom. 8.9—17; Gal. 4.5—7), and the Fourth Gospel (cf. 17.21—23).

The language of II Peter is taken up by St Irenaeus, in his famous phrase, 'if the Word has been made man, it is so that men may be made gods' (Adv. Haer V, Pref.), and becomes the standard in Greek theology. In the fourth century, St. Athanasius repeats Irenaeus almost word for word, and in the fifth century St Cyril of Alexandria says that we shall become sons 'by participation' (Greek methexis). Deification is the central idea in the spirituality of St. Maximus the Confessor, for whom the doctrine is the corollary of the Incarnation: 'Deification, briefly, is the encompassing and fulfillment of all times and ages,' ... and St. Symeon the New Theologian at the end of the tenth century writes, 'He who is God by nature converses with those whom he has made gods by grace, as a friend converses with his friends, face to face.' ...

=== Vision of God ===
According to Hierotheos Vlachos, divinization, also called theosis, "is the participation in the Uncreated grace of God" and "is identified and connected with the theoria (vision) of the Uncreated Light". "Theoria is the vision of the glory of God. Theoria is identified with the vision of the uncreated Light, the uncreated energy of God, with the union of man with God, with man's theosis. This vision, by which faith is attained, is what saves: "Faith comes by hearing the Word and by experiencing theoria (the vision of God). We accept faith at first by hearing in order to be healed, and then we attain to faith by theoria, which saves man." It is also one of the means by which Christians came to know the Trinity: "The disciples of Christ acquired the knowledge of the Triune God in theoria (vision of God) and by revelation."

=== As a patristic and historical teaching ===
For many Church Fathers, theosis goes beyond simply restoring people to their state before the Fall of Adam and Eve, teaching that because Christ united the human and divine natures in Jesus' person, it is now possible for someone to experience closer fellowship with God than Adam and Eve initially experienced in the Garden of Eden, and that people can become more like God than Adam and Eve were at that time. Some Eastern Orthodox theologians go so far as to say that Jesus would have become incarnate for this reason alone, even if Adam and Eve had never sinned.

=== Ascetic practice ===
The journey toward theosis includes many forms of praxis. The most obvious form being Monasticism and Clergy. Of the Monastic tradition the practice of hesychasm is most important as a way to establish a direct relationship with God. Living in the community of the church and partaking regularly of the sacraments, and especially the Eucharist, is taken for granted. Also important is cultivating "prayer of the heart", and prayer that never ceases, as Paul exhorts the Thessalonians (1 and 2). This unceasing prayer of the heart is a dominant theme in the writings of the Fathers, especially in those collected in the Philokalia. It is considered that no one can reach theosis without an impeccable Christian living, crowned by faithful, warm, and, ultimately, silent (hesychast), continuous Prayer of the Heart. The "doer" in deification is the Holy Spirit, with whom the human being joins his will to receive this transforming grace by praxis and prayer, and as Gregory Palamas teaches, the Christian mystics are deified as they become filled with the Light of Tabor of the Holy Spirit in the degree that they make themselves open to it by asceticism (divinization being not a one-sided act of God, but a loving cooperation between God and the advanced Christian, which Palamas considers a synergy). This synergy or co-operation between God and Man does not lead to mankind being absorbed into God as was taught in earlier pagan forms of deification like Henosis. Rather it expresses unity, in the complementary nature between the created and the creator. Acquisition of the Holy Spirit is key as the acquisition of the spirit leads to self-realization.

== Western Christianity ==
In Western Christian theology, divinization is emphasized among Catholics, as well as among Quakers who emphasize the living presence of Christ within each person and Christ-centered community. Methodists, whose religious tradition has always placed strong emphasis on entire sanctification, and whose doctrine of sanctification has many similarities with the Eastern Orthodox concept of theosis or divinization, teach the doctrine.

Patristic scholar Donald Fairbairn has argued that theosis in the Greek Fathers is not an ontological exchange between the Son and the Christian. In general Fairbairn argues that the change that occurs in theosis is "something more than mere status but less than the possession of God's very substance." In his book, Life in the Trinity, he argues that through our relationship with the Son we are brought into the same kind of relationship with the Father (and Spirit) that the Son has. He supports this argument by identifying a distinction between the Son's warm-fellowship with the Father, and his ontological union with the Father. He argues that the Greek Fathers, primarily Athanasius and Cyril of Alexandria were clear that we never share ontological union with God, but only this intimate fellowship.

Like Athanasius, but with much more precision, Cyril distinguishes two kinds of unity between the Father and the Son. The first is a unity of substance, and the Father and the Son do not share this kind of unity with us in any way whatsoever. The second, though, is a unity of love or fellowship that the father and the Son have enjoyed from all eternity precisely because of their unity of substance.

=== Catholic theology (including Latin and Eastern Churches) ===
The term divinization is characteristic of Eastern Christian thought. Western Christianity, at least since Augustine of Hippo (354-430) named as the doctor of grace, has always preferred to speak about supernatural grace transforming a Christian according to the Image of Christ. One cannot say, though, that the action of God on human nature conveyed in the term divinization (theosis) is alien to the Roman Catholic teaching, as is evident in Augustine repeating the famous phrase of Athanasius of Alexandria: "To make human beings gods, he was made man, who was God" (Deos facturus qui homines erant, homo factus est qui Deus erat). It is evident from what the Catechism of the Catholic Church says of Christians as partakers of the divine nature:

The Word became flesh to make us "partakers of the divine nature": "For this is why the Word became man, and the Son of God became the Son of man: so that man, by entering into communion with the Word and thus receiving divine sonship, might become a son of God." "For the Son of God became man so that we might become God." "The only-begotten Son of God, wanting to make us sharers in his divinity, assumed our nature, so that he, made man, might make men gods."

Medieval scholastic theologian Thomas Aquinas wrote:

Now the gift of grace surpasses every capability of created nature, since it is nothing short of a partaking of the Divine Nature, which exceeds every other nature. And thus it is impossible that any creature should cause grace. For it is as necessary that God alone should deify, bestowing a partaking of the Divine Nature by a participated likeness, as it is impossible that anything save fire should enkindle.

He also wrote of God's "special love, whereby He draws the rational creature above the condition of its nature to a participation of the Divine good". and he ultimately roots the purpose of the Incarnation in theosis. However, the divinization taught by Aquinas, Augustine, and other Fathers is not ontological, meaning that souls do not take on the substance of God, but rather through grace, are gifted with the participation in the Divine Life.

Of a more modern Roman Catholic theologian it has been said: "The theological vision of Karl Rahner, the German Jesuit whose thought has been so influential in the Roman Catholic Church and beyond over the last fifty years, has at its very core the symbol of theopoiesis. The process of divinization is the center of gravity around which move Rahner's understanding of creation, anthropology, Christology, ecclesiology, liturgy, and eschatology. The importance of this process for Rahner is such that we are justified in describing his overall theological project to be largely a matter of giving a coherent and contemporary account of divinization." Joshua Bloor in his article reveals the rise in deification from an array of Western traditions, looking closely at the Catholic Theologian Catherine LaCugna, arguing that LaCugna sees deification as "personal communion with God, which deifies the human in the process, conforming him/her into being Christ-like".

The Roman Rite liturgy expresses the doctrine of divinization or theosis in the prayer said by the deacon or priest when preparing the Eucharistic chalice: "Per huius aquae et vini mysterium eius efficiamur divinitatis consortes, qui humanitatis nostrae fieri dignatus est particeps" ("By the mystery of this water and wine may we come to share in the divinity of Christ who humbled himself to share in our humanity.")

The Catholic Church teaches that God gives to some souls, even in the present life, a very special grace by which they can be mystically united to God even while yet alive: this is true mystical contemplation. This is seen as the culmination of the three states, or stages, of perfection through which the soul passes: the purgative way (that of cleansing or purification, the Greek term for which is κάθαρσις, katharsis), the illuminative way (so called because in it the mind becomes more and more enlightened as to spiritual things and the practice of virtue, corresponding to what in Greek is called Θεωρία, theoria), and the unitive way (that of union with God by love and the actual experience and exercise of that love, a union that is called θέωσις, theosis).

The writings attributed to Dionysius the Areopagite were highly influential in the West, and their theses and arguments were adopted by Peter Lombard, Alexander of Hales, Albert the Great, Thomas Aquinas and Bonaventure. According to these writings, mystical knowledge must be distinguished from the rational knowledge by which we know God, not in his nature, but through the wonderful order of the universe, which is a participation of the divine ideas. Through the more perfect knowledge of God that is mystical knowledge, a knowledge beyond the attainments of reason even enlightened by faith, the soul contemplates directly the mysteries of divine light. In the present life this contemplation is possible only to a few privileged souls, through a very special grace of God: it is the θέωσις (theosis), μυστικὴ ἕνωσις (mystical union). Meister Eckhart too taught a deification of man and an assimilation of the creature into the Creator through contemplation.

Deification, to which, in spite of its presence in the liturgical prayers of the West, Western theologians have given less attention than Eastern, is nevertheless prominent in the writing of Western mystics.

Catherine of Siena stated God as saying:

"They are like the burning coal that no one can put out once it is completely consumed in the furnace, because it has itself been turned into fire. So it is with these souls cast into the furnace of my charity, who keep nothing at all, not a bit of their own will, outside of me but are completely set afire in me. There is no one who can seize them or drag them out of my grace. They have been made one with me and I with them."

John of the Cross wrote:

"In thus allowing God to work in it, the soul ... is at once illumined and transformed in God, and God communicates to it His supernatural Being, in such wise that it appears to be God Himself, and has all that God Himself has. And this union comes to pass when God grants the soul this supernatural favour, that all the things of God and the soul are one in participant transformation; and the soul seems to be God rather than a soul, and is indeed God by participation; although it is true that its natural being, though thus transformed, is as distinct from the Being of God as it was before."

Orestes Brownson wrote:

"The principle of the order founded by the incarnation of the Word is the deification of the creature, to make the creature one with the Creator, so that the creature may participate in the divine life, which is love, and in the divine blessedness, the eternal and infinite blessedness of the holy and ineffable Trinity, the one ever-living God. Creation itself has no other purpose or end; and the incarnation of the Word, and the whole Christian order, are designed by the divine economy simply as the means to this end, which is indeed realized or consummated in Christ the Lord, at once perfect God and perfect man, indissolubly united in one divine person. The design of the Christian order is, through regeneration by the Holy Ghost, to unite every individual man to Christ, and to make all believers one with one another, and one with him, as he and the Father are one. All who are thus regenerated and united, are united to God, made one with him, live in his life, and participate in his infinite, eternal, and ineffable bliss or blessedness."

=== Anabaptist theology ===
The early Anabaptists wrote quite extensively on the idea of theosis. Hutterite leader Peter Riedemann wrote, for example:

This shall be the covenant that I will make with them. I will set my law within them and write it on their hearts, and all of them shall know me. Jeremiah 31:33 Hebrews 8:10 Through this knowledge, a person is led to God, is grafted into him, and becomes a fellow member of his nature and essence.

Among the Dutch Mennonites, Dirk Philips and Menno Simons wrote about the concept of theosis in many of their writings. Dirk Philips explained, for example, that although humans cannot become God, per se, they can become like Him in character:

In order to understand this yet more thoroughly, everyone should observe the similarity and fellowship of God and Christ with all believers; that is, that all believers are participants of the divine nature, yes, and are called gods and children of the Most High 2 Peter 1:4 Acts 17:28 Psalms 82:6, and are in the world as Christ was the world, and shall become like him at his coming. John 10:34 John 1:12 Whenever now human beings become participants in the divine nature, yes, conformed to Christ on earth and in heaven Romans 8:14 1 John 3:1, they yet do not become identical in nature and person to what God and Christ are. Oh, no! The creature will never become the Creator and the flesh will never become the eternal itself which God is John 4:24, for this is impossible. But the believers become gods and children of the most high through the new birth, participation, and fellowship of the divine nature John 3:3, of the piety, glory, and purity of eternal life, and they will be purified as God, shine as God shines, and live as God lives eternally. John 6:47

Among the South German Mystics that became Anabaptists, the concept of divinization was also taught. In his confession, Hans Hut explained that holding spiritual communion with Christ would deify a person:

Whoever is thus-minded and drinks the invisible wine out of the invisible Cup, mixed by God from the beginning of time through his Son, the Word, will become drunk. He does not know anything about himself any more, but becomes deified (vergottet) through the love of God while God becomes incarnate in him (vermenscht). This what is meant when we speak of the eating of body and the drinking of the blood of Christ (John 6).

For the early Anabaptist Matthias Servaes, baptism signified a dying to the old nature and "an incorporation into the unity of one mind, resulting in identical natures, patterned after God who is their Father, and becoming dead to the world, that is, to all unrighteousness and crucifying their flesh daily, no longer allowing sin to reign or have the upper hand in them, as Paul clearly tells the Romans (Chapter 6), with many clear words."

=== Lutheran theology ===
More recently, the Finnish school of Lutheran thought has drawn close associations between theosis and justification. Primarily spearheaded by Tuomo Mannermaa, this line of theological development grew out of talks between the Evangelical Lutheran Church of Finland and the Russian Orthodox Church between 1970 and 1986. Mannermaa argues in his book, Christ Present in Faith, that the real exchange between Christ and sinful humanity, a theme prevalent in Luther's writing, is synonymous with Eastern views of theosis. It is in this real exchange which Mannermaa says "the union between Christ and the believer makes the latter a ‘completely divine [person] [sic]." While this departure from traditional Lutheran thought is sometimes hailed as "the threshold of a third Luther Renaissance," other Lutheran scholars disagree and argue that the idea of theosis violates Luther's theology of the cross principles by ignoring the real distinction that is axiomatic for not only Luther, but for orthodox Christianity as a whole. One of the most prominent scholars is Robert Kolb, who primarily roots this critique in Luther's use of marriage metaphors concerning the Christian's relationship with God. Kolb writes "This view ignores the nature of the ‘union’ of bride and bridegroom that Luther employed so far."

=== Reformed theology ===
Early during the Reformation, thought was given to the doctrine of union with Christ (unio cum Christo) as the precursor to the entire process of salvation and sanctification. This was especially so in the thought of John Calvin.

Henry Scougal's work The Life of God in the Soul of Man is sometimes cited as important in keeping alive among Protestants the ideas central to the doctrine. In the introductory passages of his book, Scougal describes "religion" in terms that evoke the doctrine of theosis:

... a resemblance of the divine perfections, the image of the Almighty shining in the soul of man: ... a real participation of his nature, it is a beam of the eternal light, a drop of that infinite ocean of goodness; and they who are endued with it, may be said to have 'God dwelling in their souls', and 'Christ formed within them'.

=== Anglican theology ===
Out of the English Reformation, an understanding of salvation in terms closely comparable to the Eastern Orthodox doctrine of theosis was recognized in the Anglican tradition, J. Bloor examines deification/theosis in the late Anglican Priest and theologian Canon A. M. (Donald) Allchin, but it is also explored in the writings of Lancelot Andrewes, who described salvation in terms vividly reminiscent of the early fathers:

Whereby, as before He of ours, so now we of His are made partakers. He clothed with our flesh, and we invested with His Spirit. The great promise of the Old Testament accomplished, that He should partake our human nature; and the great and precious promise of the New, that we should be "consortes divinae naturae", "partake his divine nature," both are this day accomplished.

C.S. Lewis, speaking on his personal belief in the subject of literal deification, stated as follows:

It is a serious thing to live in a society of possible gods and goddesses, to remember that the dullest and most uninteresting person you talk to may one day be a creature which, if you saw it now, you would be strongly tempted to worship.

In a more complete statement on his beliefs in literal deification, C.S. Lewis stated in his book, "Mere Christianity" as follows:

The command Be ye perfect is not idealistic gas. Nor is it a command to do the impossible. He is going to make us into creatures that can obey that command. He said (in the Bible) that we were "gods" and He is going to make good His words. If we let Him—for we can prevent Him, if we choose—He will make the feeblest and filthiest of us into a god or goddess, dazzling, radiant, immortal creature, pulsating all through with such energy and joy and wisdom and love as we cannot now imagine, a bright stainless mirror which reflects back to God perfectly (though, of course, on a smaller scale) His own boundless power and delight and goodness. The process will be long and in parts very painful; but that is what we are in for. Nothing less. He meant what He said.

=== Methodist theology ===
Theosis as a doctrine developed in a distinctive direction among Methodists, and elsewhere in the pietist movement which reawakened Protestant interest in the asceticism of the early Catholic Church, and some of the mystical traditions of the West. Distinctively, in Methodist (Wesleyan-Arminian) theology, the doctrine of entire sanctification teaches, in summary, that it is the Christian's goal, in principle possible to achieve, to live without any (voluntary) sin (Christian perfection).

We believe that God calls every believer to holiness that rises out of His character. We understand it to begin in the new birth, include a second work of grace that empowers, purifies and fills each person with the Holy Spirit, and continue in a lifelong pursuit. ―Bible Methodist Connection of Churches

In 1311 the Catholic Council of Vienne declared this notion, "that man in this present life can acquire so great and such a degree of perfection that he will be rendered inwardly sinless, and that he will not be able to advance farther in grace" (Denzinger §471), to be a heresy. Thus this Methodist understanding of theosis is substantially different from that of the Catholic Church, as well as other Protestant Churches. The Wesleyan-Arminian doctrine of Christian perfection was sharply criticized by many in the Church of England during the ministry of John Wesley and outside the Methodist tradition, it continues to be controversial among to this day among other Christian denominations.

=== Quaker theology ===
Based on their spiritual experiences and tested against the testimony of scripture, George Fox and early Quakers believed that transformation by the Holy Spirit was a normal experience within the early church, where individuals and communities were led by the living presence of Christ dwelling within them. George Fox wrote:

"The scriptures saith God will dwell in men, and walk in men … Doth not the Apostle say, the saints were partakers of the divine nature? And that God dwells in the saints, and Christ is in them, except they be reprobates? And do not the saints come to eat the flesh of Christ? And if they eat his flesh, is it not within them?"

=== Christian universalist theology ===
There has been a modern revival of the concept of theosis (often called "manifest sonship" or "Christedness") among Christians who hold to the doctrine of universal reconciliation or apocatastasis, especially those with a background in the charismatic Latter Rain Movement or even the New Age and New Thought movements. The statement of faith of the Christian Universalist Association includes theosis in one of its points.

A minority of charismatic Christian universalists believe that the "return of Christ" is a corporate body of perfected human beings who are the "Manifested Sons of God" instead of a literal return of the person of Jesus, and that these Sons will reign on the earth and transform all other human beings from sin to perfection during an age that is coming soon (a particularly "universalistic" approach to millennialism). Some liberal Christian universalists with New Age leanings share a similar eschatology.

=== Western views on hesychasm ===
The practice of ascetic prayer known as hesychasm in the Eastern Orthodox Church is centered on the enlightenment and deification(theosis) of the individual.

While Constantinople experienced a succession of councils alternately approving and condemning doctrine concerning hesychasm, the Western Church held no council in which to make a pronouncement on the issue, and the word "hesychasm" does not appear in the Enchiridion Symbolorum et Definitionum (Handbook of Creeds and Definitions), the collection of Roman Catholic teachings originally compiled by Heinrich Joseph Dominicus Denzinger.

Despite the fact that the hesychast doctrine of Gregory Palamas has never been officially condemned by the Catholic Church, Western theologians tended to reject it, often equating it with quietism. This identification may have been motivated in part by the fact that "quietism" is the literal translation of "hesychasm". However, according to Kallistos Ware, "To translate 'hesychasm' as 'quietism', while perhaps etymologically defensible, is historically and theologically misleading." Ware asserts that "the distinctive tenets of the seventeenth century Western Quietists are not characteristic of Greek hesychasm." Elsewhere too, Ware argues that it is important not to translate "hesychasm" as "quietism".

For long, Palamism won almost no following in the West,. and the distrustful attitude of Barlaam in its regard prevailed among Western theologians, surviving into the early 20th century, as shown in Adrian Fortescue's article on hesychasm in the 1910 Catholic Encyclopedia. In the same period, Siméon Vailhé described some aspects of the teaching of Palamas as "monstrous errors", "heresies" and "a resurrection of polytheism", and called the hesychast method for arriving at perfect contemplation "no more than a crude form of auto-suggestion"

The 20th century saw a remarkable change in the attitude of Roman Catholic theologians to Palamas, a "rehabilitation" of him that has led to increasing parts of the Western Church considering him a saint, even if uncanonized. John Meyendorff describes the 20th-century rehabilitation of Palamas in the Western Church as a "remarkable event in the history of scholarship." Andreas Andreopoulos cites the 1910 Catholic Encyclopedia article by Fortescue as an example of how Barlaam's distrustful and hostile attitude regarding hesychasm survived until recently in the West, adding that now "the Western world has started to rediscover what amounts to a lost tradition. Hesychasm, which was never anything close to a scholar's pursuit, is now studied by Western theologians who are astounded by the profound thought and spirituality of late Byzantium."

Some Western scholars maintain that there is no conflict between Palamas's teaching and Roman Catholic thought, and some have incorporated the essence-energies distinction into their own thinking. For example, G. Philips asserts that the essence-energies distinction as presented by Palamas is "a typical example of a perfectly admissible theological pluralism" that is compatible with the Roman Catholic magisterium.

Jeffrey D. Finch claims that "the future of East-West rapprochement appears to be overcoming the modern polemics of neo-scholasticism and neo-Palamism".

Pope John Paul II repeatedly emphasized his respect for Eastern theology as an enrichment for the whole Church, declaring that, even after the painful division between the Christian East and the See of Rome, that theology has opened up profound thought-provoking perspectives of interest to the entire Church. He spoke in particular of the hesychast controversy. The term "hesychasm", he said, refers to a practice of prayer marked by deep tranquillity of the spirit intent on contemplating God unceasingly by invoking the name of Jesus. While from a Catholic viewpoint there have been tensions concerning some developments of the practice, the Pope said, there is no denying the goodness of the intention that inspired its defence, which was to stress that man is offered the concrete possibility of uniting himself in his inner heart with God in that profound union of grace known as theosis, divinization.

Among the treasures of "the venerable and ancient tradition of the Eastern Churches" with which he said Catholics should be familiar, so as to be nourished by it, he mentioned in particular "the teaching of the Cappadocian Fathers on divinization (which) passed into the tradition of all the Eastern Churches and is part of their common heritage. This can be summarized in the thought already expressed by Saint Irenaeus at the end of the second century: God passed into man so that man might pass over to God. This theology of divinization remains one of the achievements particularly dear to Eastern Christian thought."

=== Latter Day Saint theology ===
Mormonism includes a belief in the doctrine of exaltation, by which is meant a literal divinization. According to Latter-day Saint scholars, there are similarities between the Latter-day Saint belief of eternal progression and the beliefs found in the patristic writings of the first, second, and third centuries A.D.

According to the founder of the Latter Day Saint movement, Joseph Smith, through obedience to Christ and the gradual acquisition of knowledge, the faithful may eventually become heirs of God in the afterlife and "inherit all things" as Christ himself "inherited all things." Latter-day Saints believe they will continue to worship and be subject to God the Father in the name of Christ in the afterlife.

Mormons do not characterize the Father, Son, and Holy Spirit in terms of an immaterial, formless substance or essence that sets godhood apart as a separate genus from humanity. They believe that this classification of divinity was originated by post-apostolic theologians, whose speculations on God were influenced by Greek metaphysical philosophers such as the Neoplatonists, who described their notions of deity in similar terms of a divine substance/essence (ousia)—i.e. terms which were unknown to the pre-Nicean Christian world. Latter-day Saints believe that through modern day revelation, God restored the doctrine that all humans are spiritually begotten (Hebrews 12:9, Acts 17:28–29) sons and daughters of Heavenly Father, and thus are all part of the same heavenly family. Because humans are literally God's children, they can also be heirs of his glory, and joint heirs with Jesus Christ (Romans 8:16–17).

Latter-day Saints believe that the "glory of God is intelligence, in other words, light and truth" (D&C 93:36). Therefore the process of inheriting his glory is a process of learning. As a crucial step in this process, all of God's spirit children had the choice to come to earth in order to receive a body and continue their development. Latter-day Saints believe that the fallen state of humanity (mortality) was not the result of an unplanned cancellation of God's plan for an eternal earthly paradise, rather it was a crucial step that provides the opportunity to learn and grow in the face of opposition (2 Nephi 2:11, 25). Thus, the purpose of earth life is to gain knowledge and experience—which includes overcoming trials and mistakes through the atonement of Jesus Christ and, using the lessons learned, to become stronger and wiser, more like their Heavenly Father (D&C 98:3). Those who endure to the end (Matthew 24:13, Mark 13:13) while in mortality, as well as those who accept the gospel after death (see baptism for the dead), will be able to dwell in the presence of God, where they can continue to grow in light and truth, which "light groweth brighter and brighter until the perfect day" (D&C 50:24). Latter-day Saints believe that the Father and the Son both possess glorified, immortal, physical bodies (D&C 130:22) and that thanks to Christ's resurrection, humans will also be resurrected and inherit this same type of body (Philippians 3:21).
