= Jesus is Lord =

Creed or statement of faith popular in Christianity

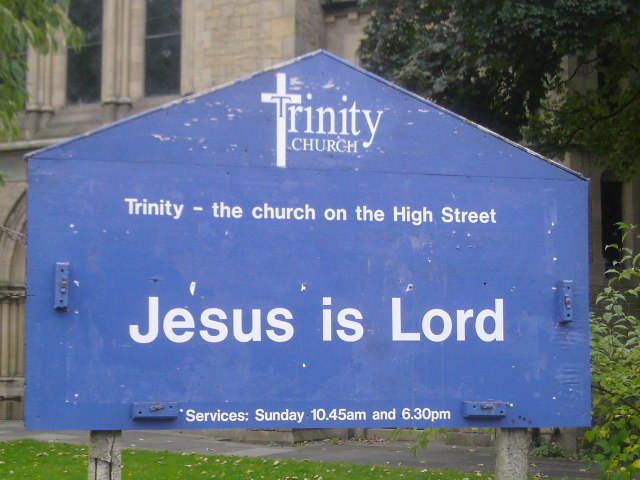
"Jesus is Lord" sign at Trinity Church in Gosforth, Newcastle upon Tyne, England

"Jesus is Lord" (Greek: Κύριος Ἰησοῦς, romanized: Kýrios Iēsoûs) is the shortest credal affirmation found in the New Testament, one of several slightly more elaborate variations. It serves as a statement of faith for the majority of Christians who regard Jesus as both truly man and God. It is the motto of the World Council of Churches.

== Background ==
In antiquity, in general use, the term "lord" was a courtesy title for social superiors, but its root meaning was "ruler". Kings everywhere were styled "Lord" and often considered divine beings so the word acquired a religious significance. When the Hebrew Bible was translated into Greek in the Septuagint at least two centuries before Christianity, Kurios was used for the divine tetragrammaton YHWH which was no longer read aloud but replaced with adonai, a special form of the Hebrew adon = "lord".

When in 27 BC Roman Emperor Octavian received the title of "Augustus" it carried religious overtones, suggesting a special relationship with the world of the gods, symbolised by the cult of the Emperor's "genius", a veiled form of emperor-worship. To refuse to honor the national gods was unpatriotic and akin to sabotage.

J. G. Davies comments that the Christian begins from the confession of Jesus as Lord – Jesus who is sovereign over the individual's relation to the state, "we must understand the state in the context of the command to love one's neighbour."

== Credal phrases in the New Testament ==
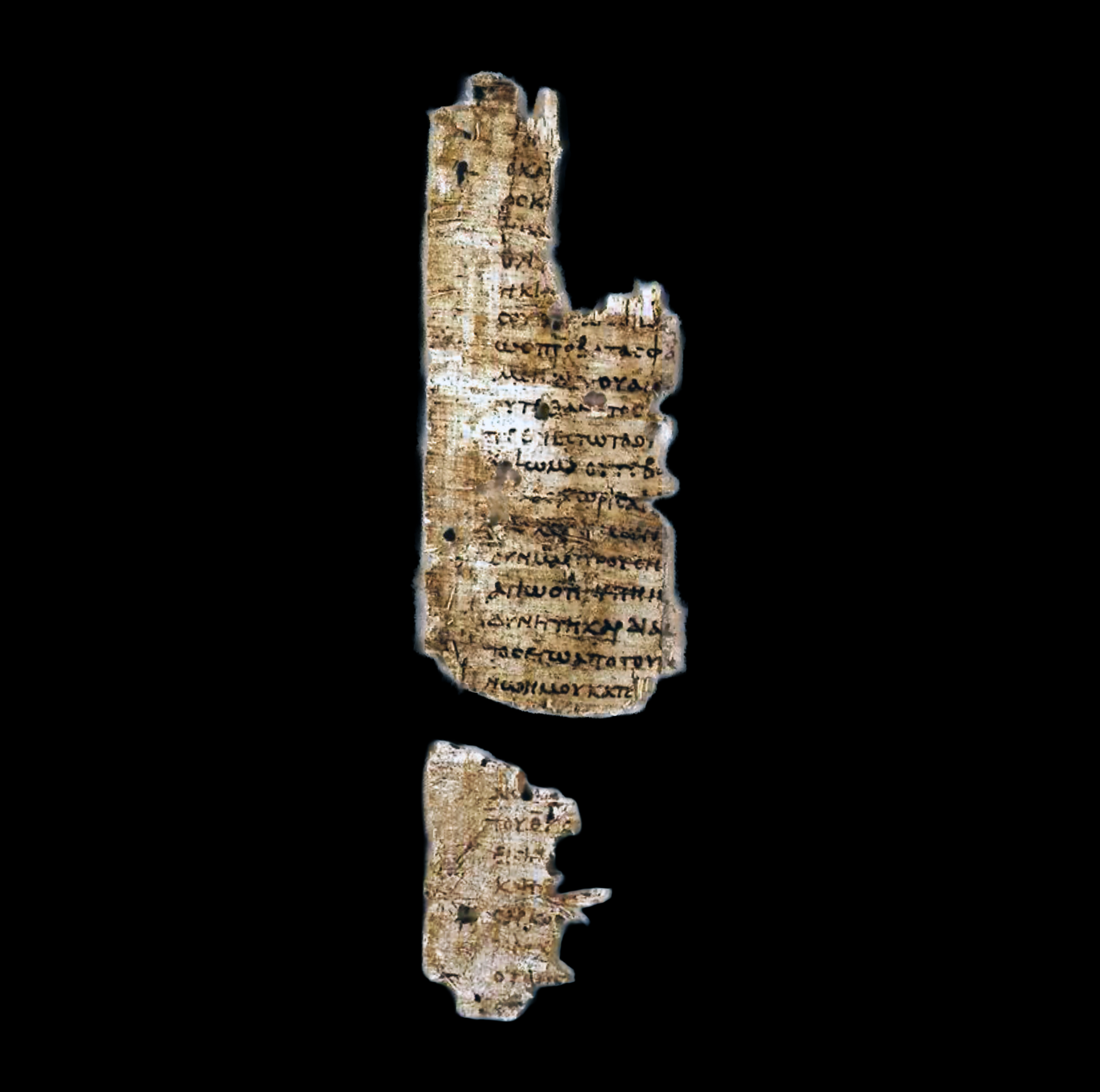
Part of the Epistle to the Romans in Papyrus 27 early 3rd century.

In Pauline Christianity, J. N. D. Kelly points out creed-like slogans attributed to Paul the Apostle in Galatians, 2 Thessalonians, Romans and 1 Corinthians, though they never formed a fixed, standard creed. The most popular and briefest was "Jesus is Lord" found in 1 Corinthians 12:3; Romans 10:9 and probably in the baptisms referred to in Acts 8:16; 19:5 and 1 Cor 6:11 since their being described as "in the name of the Lord Jesus" certainly seems to imply that "the formula 'Jesus is Lord' had a place in the rite". The phrase might be extended as "Jesus Christ is Lord" as in Philippians 2:11.

In the early days, the similar formula "Jesus is the Christ" was found, but this faded into the background when its original Messianic significance was forgotten. Of more long-term significance was the affirmation "Jesus is the Son of God". These were expounded upon by passages such as 1 Corinthians 15:3–7 and Romans 1:3–4 which describe Christ's work of salvation and the existence of witnesses to his resurrection and he goes on in the following pages to list another ten examples of passages which attach to the name of Jesus "selected incidents in the redemptive story".

== Biblical passages ==
1 Corinthians 12:3	"No one can say Jesus is Lord except by the Holy Spirit."
Romans 10:9-13	"If with your mouth you confess Jesus is Lord and believe in your heart that God raised Him from the dead, you will be saved. . . . For whosoever shall call on the name of the Lord shall be saved."
Philippians 2:11	"and every tongue confess that Jesus Christ is Lord, to the glory of God the Father."
1 Corinthians 15:3-7	"For I passed on to you in the first place what I had myself received, that Christ died for our sins according to the Scriptures, and that he was buried, that he was raised on the third day according to the Scriptures, and that he appeared to Cephas, then to the Twelve, then to more than five hundred brothers at once ... then he appeared to James, then to all the apostles ..."
Romans 1:3-4	"Concerning His Son, Who was born of David's seed by natural descent, Who was declared Son of God with power by the Spirit of Holiness when he was raised from the dead, Jesus Christ our Lord, through whom we have received grace."

== See also ==
- Names and titles of Jesus in the New Testament#Lord
- List of Christian creeds
- Christ the King

== Sources ==
- Bruce, F. F. (1964). The Spreading Flame. Paternoster Press.
- Davies, J. G. (1976). Christians, Politics and Violent Revolution. SCM.
- Epistle to Diognetus, 5 quoted in Bruce 1964:177
- Frend, W. H. C. (1965). The Early Church. Hodder & Stoughton.
- Green, E. M. B. (1970). Evangelism in the Early Church. Hodder & Stoughton.
- Kelly, J. N. D. (1960). Early Christian Creeds. Longmans.
- Richardson, Alan (1950). A Theological Wordbook of the Bible. SCM.
- Whiteley, D. E. H. (1964). The Theology of St Paul. Basil Blackwell.
- Workman, Hubert (1960). Persecution in the Early Church. Wyvern Books.
