= Book of Concord =

Historic doctrinal standard of the Lutheran Church

The Book of Concord
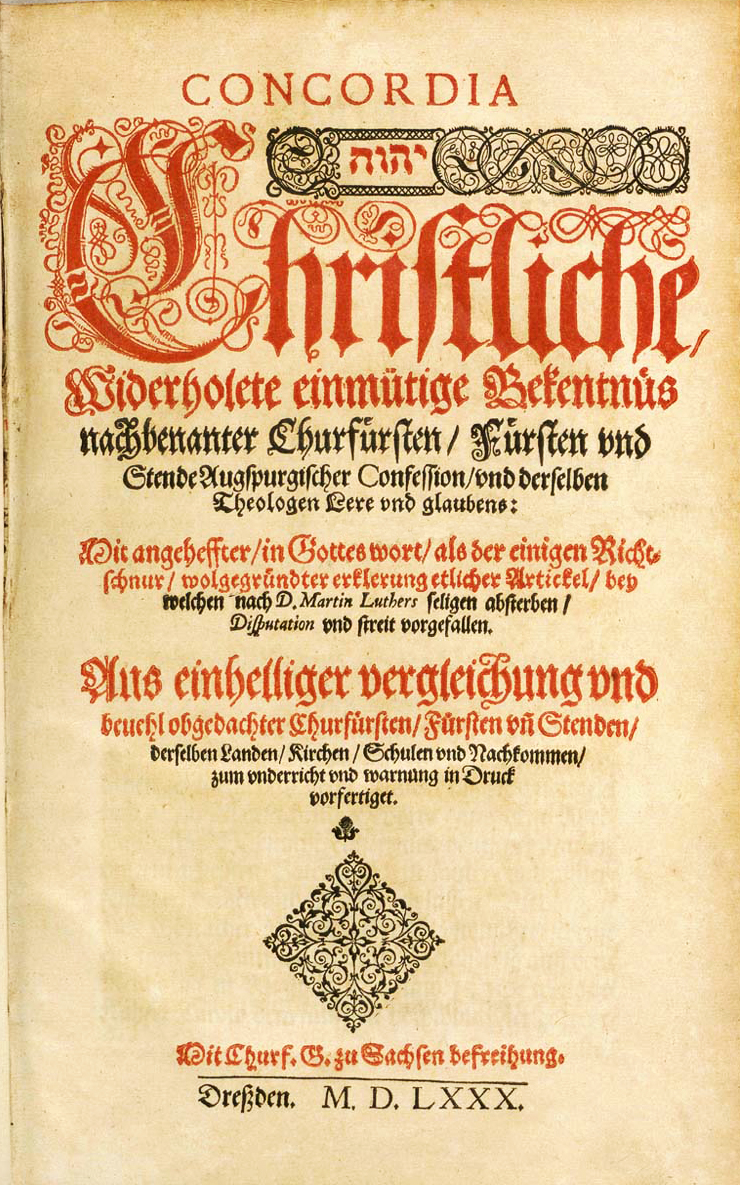
- Title page from the 1580 German edition
- Author: Jakob Andreae and Martin Chemnitz (compilers)
- Language: German
- Subject: Lutheranism; Doctrine of the Lutheran Church
- Published: 1580
- Publication place: Germany

The Book of Concord (1580) or Concordia (often referred to as the Lutheran Confessions) is the historic doctrinal standard recognized as authoritative by many Lutheran church bodies since the 16th century. It consists of ten creedal documents and is also known as the symbolical book of the Evangelical Lutheran Church.

The Book of Concord was published in German on June 25, 1580, in Dresden, the fiftieth anniversary of the presentation of the Augsburg Confession to Emperor Charles V at the Diet of Augsburg. The authoritative Latin edition was published in 1584 in Leipzig.

Those who accept it as their doctrinal standard recognize it to be a faithful exposition of the Bible. The Holy Scriptures are set forth in The Book of Concord to be the sole, divine source and norm of all Christian doctrine.

== Origin and arrangement ==
The Book of Concord was compiled by a group of theologians led by Jakob Andreae and Martin Chemnitz at the behest of their rulers, who desired an end to the religious controversies in their territories that arose among Lutherans after the death of Martin Luther in 1546. It was intended to replace German territorial collections of doctrinal statements, known as corpora doctrinæ (bodies of doctrine) such as the Corpus doctrinæ Philippicum or Misnicum. This aim is reflected by the compilers' not calling it a corpus doctrinæ although it technically is one. The list of writings predating the Formula of Concord that would be included in The Book of Concord are listed and described in the "Rule and Norm" section of the Formula.

Following the preface written by Andreae and Chemnitz (1578–1580) the "Three Ecumenical Creeds" were placed at the beginning in order to show the identity of Lutheran teaching with that of the ancient Christian church. These creeds, the Apostles' Creed, Nicene Creed, and Athanasian Creed, were formulated before the East-West Schism of 1054, but the Nicene Creed is the western version containing the filioque.

The other documents come from the earliest years of the Lutheran Reformation (1529–1577). They are the Augsburg Confession, the Apology of the Augsburg Confession, both by Philipp Melanchthon, the Small and Large Catechisms of Martin Luther, his Smalcald Articles, Melanchthon's Treatise on the Power and Primacy of the Pope, and the Formula of Concord, which was composed shortly before the publishing of the Book of Concord and intended for the same purpose: the pacification and unification of the growing Lutheran movement. The preface of the Book of Concord was considered to be the preface of the Formula of Concord as well.

The Augsburg Confession has singular importance

as the unanimous consensus and exposition of our Christian faith, particularly against the false worship, idolatry, and superstition of the papacy and against other sects, and as the symbol of our time, the first and unaltered Augsburg Confession, which was delivered to Emperor Charles V at Augsburg during the great Diet in the year 1530 ...

A recent book on Lutheranism asserts, "To this day ... the Augsburg Confession ... remains the basic definition of what it means to be a 'Lutheran.'" The Apology, the Smalcald Articles, the Treatise, and the Formula of Concord explain, defend, or serve as addenda to The Augsburg Confession.

== Contents ==
- Preface (1579)
- The Three Ecumenical creeds.
  - The Apostles' Creed
  - The Nicene Creed
  - The Athanasian Creed
- The Augsburg Confession of 1530
- The Apology of the Augsburg Confession (1531)
- The Smalcald Articles of Martin Luther (1537)
- Treatise on the Power and Primacy of the Pope (1537)
- The Small Catechism of Martin Luther (1529)
  - Luther's Marriage Booklet (1529) and Baptism Booklet (1526) were included as part of the Small Catechism in a few of the 1580 editions of the German Book of Concord
- The Large Catechism of Martin Luther (1529)
- Epitome of the Formula of Concord (1577)
- The Solid or Thorough Declaration of the Formula of Concord (1577).
  - The Catalog of Testimonies was added as an appendix in most of the 1580 editions.

== Context in Christendom ==
The simple Latin title of the Book of Concord, Concordia (Latin for "an agreeing together"), is fitting for the character of its contents: Christian statements of faith setting forth what is believed, taught, and confessed by the confessors "with one heart and voice." This follows St. Paul's directive: "that you all speak the same thing, and that there be no divisions among you, but that you be perfectly joined together in the same mind and in the same judgment." (1 Cor. 1:10; NKJV). The creeds and confessions that constitute the Book of Concord are not the private writings of their various authors:

Inasmuch, however, as they are in complete agreement with Holy Scripture, and in this respect differ from all other particular symbols, (Note: i.e., denominational creeds and credal statements) the Lutheran confessions are truly ecumenical and catholic in character. They contain the truths believed universally by true Christians everywhere, explicitly by all consistent Christians, implicitly even by inconsistent and erring Christians. Christian truth, being one and the same the world over is none other than that which is found in the Lutheran confessions.

— F. Bente, Historical Introduction to the Lutheran Confessions

== Contemporary subscription ==
To this day the Book of Concord is doctrinally normative among traditional and conservative Lutheran churches, which require their pastors and other rostered church workers to pledge themselves unconditionally to the Book of Concord. They often identify themselves as "confessional Lutherans". They consider the Book of Concord the norma normata (Latin, "the normed norm") in relation to the Bible, which they consider the norma normans (Latin, "the norming norm"), i.e. the only source of Christian doctrine (God's authoritative word). In this view the Book of Concord, on the topics that it addresses, is what the church authoritatively understands God's authoritative word to say. This is also called a "quia" (because) subscription to the Lutheran confessions, i.e. one subscribes because the Book of Concord is a faithful exposition of the Scriptures.

It implies that the subscriber has examined the Lutheran confessions in the light of the Scriptures in order to arrive at this position, which in the subscriber's view does not require the disclaimer implied in a "quatenus" (insofar as) subscription. One who subscribes the Lutheran confessions quatenus, insofar as they are a faithful exposition of the Scriptures, believes that there might be contradictions of the Scriptures in them. In some cases this is the manner of subscription of some other Lutheran churches, such as the Evangelical Lutheran Church in America (ELCA), which regard the Book of Concord as an important witness and guide to the historical teachings of the Lutheran Church although not necessarily doctrinally binding.

== English translations ==
English translations of individual documents of The Book of Concord, notably The Augsburg Confession, were available since the 16th century. The first complete English translation of The Book of Concord was the 1851 Henkel edition followed by a second edition in 1854. These volumes included historical introductions.

Henry E. Jacobs and others published the next English version in 1882 with a revised "People's Edition" in 1911. The 1882 edition was accompanied by a companion volume that contained historical introductions and English translations of other documents illustrative of the history of The Book of Concord.

The third complete English translation, which also included the German and Latin texts, was published in 1921 as a jubilee observance of the 400th anniversary of the Reformation (1917) called the Concordia Triglotta: The Symbolical Books of the Ev. Lutheran Church, German-Latin English edited by Friederich Bente. This edition introduced the practice of inserting in square brackets the translations of variant readings of either the Latin translation of the German or the German translation of the Latin text. A smaller edition with just the English text was also published.

The differences of the German translation of The Apology of the Augsburg Confession from the original Latin text were made apparent by Bente's insertion within square brackets of the variant readings of his English translation of the German text into the main body of his translation of the original Latin text. Justus Jonas, who had originally translated the Apology from Latin into German, made use of both the quarto and the octavo editions. The other reason for the differences is the "looseness" of the Jonas translation that is more like a paraphrase than a translation.

With the appearance of the 1930 Bekenntnisschriften critical text, a new English version was deemed desirable. This was begun but left unfinished by John C. Mattes, who died in 1948. In 1959, the "Tappert" edition was produced, with Theodore G. Tappert as general editor and translator and with Jaroslav Pelikan, Robert H. Fisher, and Arthur Carl Piepkorn as additional translators. This edition discontinued the practice of inserting translations of variant readings in square brackets. However, it began the practice of providing the translations of both the German and Latin texts of the Augsburg Confession since both texts of that confession are considered authoritative. The manner of presentation was the translation of the German text on the top of the page, that of the Latin on the bottom.

An extensive revision of the Tappert edition was published in 2000, translated and edited by Robert Kolb and Timothy J. Wengert. As with the Tappert edition, the "Kolb-Wengert Edition" was translated by scholars from two different Lutheran denominations (Kolb of the Lutheran Church – Missouri Synod and Wengert of the Evangelical Lutheran Church in America). This edition provided the translations of both German and Latin texts of the Augsburg Confession on alternating pages. The translation team also included Eric Gritsch, Charles Arand, William Russell, James Schaaf, and Jane Strohl.

The Kolb-Wengert edition exhibits one of the difficulties in the translation of The Apology of the Augsburg Confession. Two editions of The Apology were published in 1531, namely, the "quarto edition" and the "octavo edition", which are so designated based on the format in which they were printed. The quarto edition was printed with the first publication of The Augsburg Confession in April or May 1531; hence, the name "editio princeps" ["first edition"]. The octavo edition followed in September, 1531.

The Kolb-Wengert translation of The Apology of the Augsburg Confession uses the later octavo edition text of 1531 rather than the earlier quarto edition text of 1531, with the variant readings of the quarto edition appearing in italics. The Tappert edition had used the quarto edition as the basis of its translation. The editors and translators of the Kolb-Wengert edition decided to use the octavo edition as the main source for their translation because they believed the octavo edition was the official text of The Apology. This is the position of the German scholar Christian Peters, who claimed the quarto edition was merely a stage on the way to a definitive text, i.e. the octavo edition.

The octavo edition Latin text was utilized in a private Latin edition of The Book of Concord in 1580. Scholars question whether or not this octavo edition text can be considered the text approved by the Lutheran Church in the 16th century. The official 1584 Latin Book of Concord has the quarto edition text as its text of The Apology of the Augsburg Confession. Another notable feature of the Kolb-Wengert edition is the setting off of "the filioque" of the Nicene Creed in square brackets.

The most recent English version of the Book of Concord was published in 2005 to commemorate the 425th anniversary of its publication and the 475th anniversary of the presentation of The Augsburg Confession. Entitled Concordia: The Lutheran Confessions—A Reader's Edition of the Book of Concord, it is a revision of the English text of the Concordia Triglotta and was edited by Paul T. McCain, Edward A. Engelbrecht, Robert C. Baker, and Gene E. Veith. A second edition followed in 2006.

== Editions available ==
- Die Bekenntnisschriften der evangelisch-lutherischen Kirche. Herausgegeben in Gedenkjahr der Augsburgischen Konfession 1930. 12th edition. Göttingen: Vandenhoek & Ruprecht, 1998. ISBN 978-3-525-52101-4 (Critical text of the original German and Latin Book of Concord)
- The Book of Concord: The Confessions of the Evangelical Lutheran Church. Theodore G. Tappert, translator and editor. Philadelphia: Fortress Press, 1959. ISBN 0-8006-0825-9. (First English translation of The Book of Concord texts as published in Die Bekenntnisschriften) [Called "Tappert" or the "Tappert Edition" for short]
- The Book of Concord: The Confessions of the Evangelical Lutheran Church. Robert Kolb and Timothy J. Wengert, editors. Minneapolis: Augsburg Fortress Press, 2000. ISBN 0-8006-2740-7. (Second English translation of The Book of Concord texts as published in Die Bekenntnisschriften.
- Concordia: The Lutheran Confessions — A Reader's Edition of the Book of Concord. Paul Timothy McCain, general editor. second edition. St. Louis: Concordia Publishing House, 2006. ISBN 0-7586-1343-1. (A modern language version of the English text of Concordia Triglotta, St. Louis: CPH, 1921 interspersed with explanatory notes)
- Concordia Triglotta: The Symbolical Books of the Ev. Lutheran Church, German-Latin-English. F. Bente, editor. St. Louis: Concordia Publishing House, 1921. (This trilingual version has recently been reprinted by Concordia Publishing House.)

== Bibliography ==
- Bente, Friedrich. Historical Introductions to the Symbolical Books of the Evangelical Lutheran Church (1921). New reprint edition. St. Louis: Concordia Publishing House, 1995. ISBN 0-570-03262-8.
- Cook, Martin L. The Open Circle: Confessional Method in Theology. Minneapolis, Minn.: Fortress Press, 1991. xiv, 130 p. N.B.: Discusses the place of Confessionalism in Lutheranism and in other Protestant thought. ISBN 0-8006-2482-3
- Fagerberg, Holsten. A New Look at the Lutheran Confessions (1529–1537). Translated by Gene Lund. Paperback Edition. St. Louis: Concordia Publishing House, 1988. ISBN 0-570-04499-5.
- Forell, George W. The Augsburg Confession: A Contemporary Commentary. Minneapolis: Augsburg Publishing House, 1968. LOC 68–25798.
- Formula of Concord, The: Quadricentennial Essays. The Sixteenth Century Journal 8 (1977) no. 4. ISSN 0361-0160.
- Grane, Lief. The Augsburg Confession: A Commentary. Translated by John H. Rasmussen. Minneapolis, Augsburg Publishing House, 1986. ISBN 0-8066-2252-0.
- Kolb, Robert and Charles P. Arand. The Genius of Luther's Theology: A Wittenberg Way of Thinking for the Contemporary Church. Grand Rapids, Michigan: Baker Academic, 2008. ISBN 978-0-8010-3180-9.
- Kolb, Robert and James A. Nestingen, eds. Sources and Contexts of The Book of Concord. Minneapolis: Fortress Press, 2001. ISBN 0-8006-3290-7.
- Robert Kolb: Die Konkordienformel. Eine Einführung in ihre Geschichte und Theologie, Oberursler Hefte Ergänzungsband 8, Edition Ruprecht, Göttingen 2011, ISBN 978-3-7675-7145-7
- Preus, Jacob A.O. The Second Martin: The Life and Theology of Martin Chemnitz. St. Louis: Concordia Publishing House, 2004.
- Preus, Robert D. and Wilbert H. Rosin, eds. A Contemporary Look at the Formula of Concord. St. Louis: Concordia Publishing House, 1978. ISBN 0-570-03271-7.
- Preus, Robert D. Getting Into the Theology of Concord. Reprint. St. Louis: Concordia Publishing House, 2004.
- Preus, Robert D. Theology of Post-Reformation Lutheranism: Volume I. St. Louis: Concordia Publishing House, 1972. ISBN 0-570-04545-2.
- Reu, Johann Michael. The Augsburg Confession. Reprint. St. Louis: Concordia Publishing House, 1995.
- Schlink, Edmund. Theology of the Lutheran Confessions. Translated by P. Koehneke and H. Bouman. Philadelphia: Fortress Press, 1961. Reprint, St. Louis: Concordia Publishing House, 2004.
- Schmauk, Theodore. The Confessional Principle and the Confessions of the Lutheran Church. Translated by C. Theodore Benze. St. Louis: Concordia Publishing House, Reprint 2005.
- The Sixteenth Century Journal 11 (June 25, 1980) no. 3: 450th Anniversary Augsburg Confession. ISSN 0361-0160.
- Wengert, Timothy J. A Formula for Parish Practice: Using the Formula of Concord in Congregations. Grand Rapids: Eerdmans Publishing, 2006. ISBN 0-8028-3026-9.
- Ziegler, Roland F., "The New Translation of the Book of Concord: Closing the barn door after..., Concordia Theological Quarterly 66 (April 2002) 2:145-165.
