= Aegidius Hunnius =

German theologian (1550–1603)

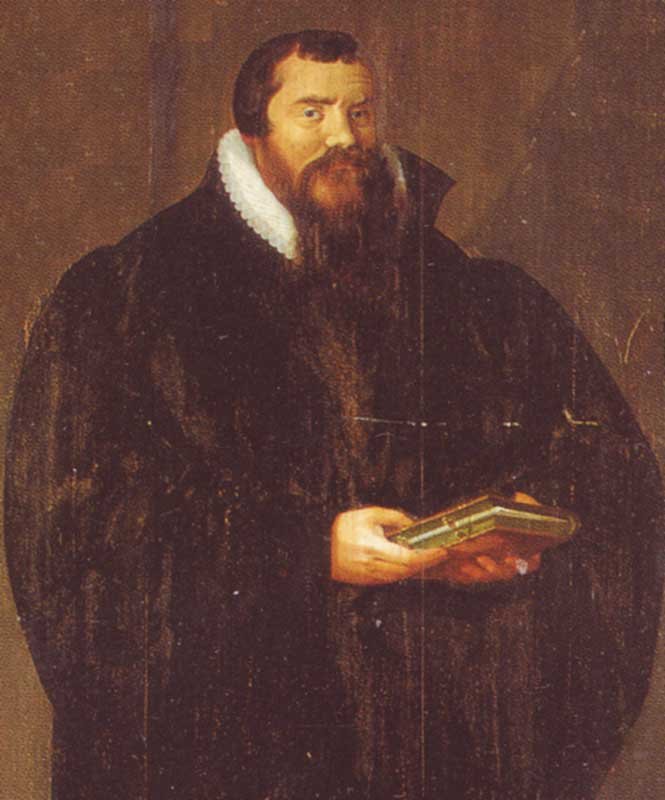
Aegidius Hunnius

Aegidius Hunnius the Elder (21 December 1550 in Winnenden – 4 April 1603 in Wittenberg) was a Lutheran theologian of the Lutheran scholastic tradition and father of Nicolaus Hunnius.

== Life ==
Hunnius went rapidly through the preparatory schools of Württemberg, and studied from 1565 to 1574 at Tübingen. In 1576 Jacob Heerbrand recommended him as professor to the University of Marburg, where Hunnius exerted himself to do away with all compromises and restore Lutheran orthodoxy. He gained many adherents, and the consequence was a split in the State Church of Hesse which finally led to the separation of Upper and Lower Hesse. The cardinal point of all controversies was the doctrine of ubiquity which Hunnius maintained in his writing De persona Christi. Bartholomäus Meier, one of Landgrave William's theologians, replied, but could not prevail against Hunnius' learned eloquence.

In 1592 Hunnius removed to Wittenberg. In the electorate of Saxony, Calvinism had made great headway under the elector Christian, but his successor, Duke Frederick William, desired to introduce Lutheran orthodoxy, and for this purpose called the Swabian theologians, among them Hunnius, to Wittenberg. Immediately after his arrival he was made member of a committee on visitation, instituted for the purpose of purifying the country from Calvinism (see: Saxon Visitation Articles).

For the same purpose he was called into other German territories, as, for instance, into Silesia by Duke Frederick of Liegnitz. Hunnius was the most able representative of the Swabian theology of Johannes Brenz, and consequently of the doctrine concerning the majesty and omnipresence of Christ as man. But he advanced the Lutheran cause also in reference to other doctrines, and his influence is traceable in the development of Lutheran dogmatics after his time. The later doctrine concerning the authority of Holy Scripture is based upon Hunnius' Tractatus de maiestate, fide, autoritate et certitudine sacrae scripturae. In the same way he established the orthodox Lutheran doctrine of predestination by following John of Damascus in his distinction between voluntas antecedens and consequens, and considering faith as the instrumental cause of election.

== Bibliography ==
The literary activity of Hunnius was mainly polemical. His most important works are:

- De persona Christi (1585), which is an enlargement of an earlier treatise entitled Bekenntnis von der Person Christi (1577)
- Tractatus de maiestate, fide, autoritate et certitudine sacrae scripturae (1588)
- Calvinus iudaizans, sive Judaicae glossae et corruptelae in explicandis testimoniis Scripturae Sacrae de trinitate, etc. (1593)
- Anti-Parens (1594)
- Anti-Parens alter (1599)

He wrote also numerous dogmatic monographs and commentaries on the Gospels of Matthew and John, the Epistles of Paul, and the first Epistle of John. He composed several Biblical dramas in Latin, among them Josephus, comaedia sacra, which was presented at Strasburg in 1597. A complete edition of his Latin writings was edited by his son in-law, H. Garthius (5 vols., Wittenberg, 1607–09).
