= Tuomo Mannermaa =

Tuomo Mannermaa (Oulu, Finland, 29 September 1937 – Espoo, 19 January 2015) was professor emeritus of ecumenical theology at University of Helsinki. He is known especially for his theological criticism of the Leuenberg Concord and his research on the relationship between justification and theosis in the theology of Martin Luther. His initiating and furthering this research caused him to be regarded as the father of "The New Finnish Interpretation of Luther" or "the Finnish School of Tuomo Mannermaa".

== Finnish School ==
Mannermaa led the development of "The New Finnish Interpretation of Luther" that presents Luther's views on salvation in terms much closer to the Eastern Orthodox doctrine of theosis rather than established interpretations of German Luther scholarship. This research has recently been presented in English in an anthology of papers edited by Carl E. Braaten and Robert W. Jenson in a work entitled, Union with Christ: The New Finnish Interpretation of Luther. Mannermaa states, "the external impulse for this new wave of Luther studies in Helsinki came surprisingly from outside the boundaries of Luther research. It came from the ecumenical dialogue between the Evangelical Lutheran Church of Finland and the Russian Orthodox Church that was initiated by Archbishop Martti Simojoki at the beginning of the nineteen-seventies."

The New Finnish Interpretation has been challenged because it downplays Luther's roots in key theological developments in Western Christendom, and it characterizes Luther's teaching on Justification as based on Jesus's righteousness which indwells the believer rather than Jesus's righteousness as imputed to the believer.

== Selected works ==
- Von Preussen nach Leuenberg: Hintergrund und Entwicklung der theologischen Methode der Leuenberger Konkordie. Lutherisches Verlagshaus, 1981 ISBN 3-7859-0480-0
- Christ Present in Faith: Luther's View of Justification. Fortress Press, 2005 ISBN 0-8006-3711-9
