= Auburn Affirmation =

The Auburn Affirmation is a document dated May 1924, with the title "AN AFFIRMATION designed to safeguard the unity and liberty of the Presbyterian Church in the United States of America", authored by an eleven-member Conference Committee and signed by 1274 ministers of the PCUSA. The Affirmation challenged the right of the highest body of the church, the General Assembly, to impose the Five Fundamentals as a test of orthodoxy without the concurrence of a vote from the regional bodies, the presbyteries.

== History ==
In 1910, 1916, and again in 1923, the General Assembly declared that every candidate seeking to be ordained in the Presbyterian Church ought to be able to affirm

1. Inerrancy of the Scriptures
2. The virgin birth (and the deity of Jesus)
3. The doctrine of substitutionary atonement
4. The bodily resurrection of Jesus
5. The authenticity of Christ's miracles

The Auburn Theological Seminary history professor, Robert Hastings Nichols, proposed to challenge this procedure of repeatedly affirming additional standards of orthodoxy, besides the Bible and the Westminster Confession of Faith – which were the only standards of orthodoxy officially recognized by the church. The Affirmation denounces that procedure of affirming the Fundamentals in the General Assembly as a contradiction of the history and polity of the Presbyterian Church. It was drafted and signed by a writing group, primarily Nichols and Henry Sloane Coffin, with the original intention of presenting it to the General Assembly of 1923. After events of the Assembly that year appeared to indicate that their thesis would be favorably received by moderates, Coffin suggested that the Affirmation should be signed by ministers before being formally made public; and in accord with that advice it was circulated for signature in preparation for the General Assembly of 1924.

== The Affirmation ==
Although the Affirmation did not officially come from Auburn Theological Seminary (at that time located in Auburn, New York), the name "Auburn Affirmation" has been attached to the document from the beginning, because of Nichols' influence as the originator of the idea.

The Auburn Affirmation was the culmination of the Fundamentalist–Modernist Controversy, which by 1924 had been a conflict of more than thirty years within the Presbyterian Church (USA). It is generally regarded as signalling a turning point in the history of American Presbyterianism, because it garnered the support of both theological traditionalists and liberals. Besides the 1274 signatories, the document as submitted claimed the support of "hundreds of ministers who agree with and approve of the Affirmation, though they have refrained from signing it."

== Content ==
The Affirmation has six sections that can be summarized as:

1. The Westminster Confession of Faith is not inerrant. The supreme guide of scripture interpretation is the Spirit of God to the individual believer and not ecclesiastical authority. Thus, "liberty of conscience" is elevated over the Westminster Confession of Faith.
2. The General Assembly has no power to dictate doctrine to the Presbyteries.
3. The General Assembly's condemnation of those asserting "doctrines contrary to the standards of the Presbyterian Church" circumvented the due process set forth in the Book of Discipline.
4. None of the five essential doctrines should be used as a test of ordination. Alternate "theories" of these doctrines are permissible.
5. Liberty of thought and teaching, within the bounds of evangelical Christianity is necessary.
6. Division is deplored, unity and freedom are commended.

Referring to the Five Fundamentals as "particular theories", the Affirmation's argument is succinctly summarized in two sentences:

Some of us regard the particular theories contained in the deliverance of the General Assembly of 1923 as satisfactory explanations of these facts and doctrines. But we are united in believing that these are not the only theories allowed by the Scriptures and our standards as explanations of these facts and doctrines of our religion, and that all who hold to these facts and doctrines, whatever theories they may employ to explain them, are worthy of all confidence and fellowship.

Partly due to the acceptance of the Auburn Affirmation, Presbyterian traditionalists who found themselves displaced because of it went on to found the Orthodox Presbyterian Church. This church maintains the older standards, such as belief in the five essential doctrines (listed above).

Discussion of the Affirmation continued into the 1940s when the Presbyterian Church in the U.S. (aka, Southern Presbyterian Church) began to consider union with the northern Presbyterian Church in the U.S.A., with conservatives charging that the Affirmation was indicative of the theological posture of the northern denomination.

== Conservative Presbyterian Responses ==
- 1925: "Liberty Within Evangelical Bounds," by David S. Kennedy
  1925: "Shall the General Assembly Represent the Church?," by J. Gresham Machen
  1925: "Are There Two Religions in the Presbyterian Church?," by David S. Kennedy
  1926: "The Mission of the Church," by J. Gresham Machen
  1932: "The Heretical 'Auburn Affirmation': A Menace to the True Peace and Purity of the Presbyterian Church," by H. McAllister Griffiths
  1935: "The Auburn Heresy" by Gordon H. Clark
  1942: "The Auburn Affirmation" by Daniel S. Gage
  1942: "The Effect of the Auburn Affirmation," by Wm. Childs Robinson
  1944: "Dr. Lingle and the Auburn Affirmation," by Daniel S. Gage
  1944: "The Liberal Attack Upon the Supernatural Christ, by Wm. Childs Robinson
