= Saxon Visitation Articles =

1590s Lutheran doctrinal statement

Visitation Articles in the Entire Electorate of Saxony (German: Visitation-Artikel in gantzen Churkreiss Sachsen) are a Lutheran doctrinal statement written by Aegidius Hunnius and other theologians against Crypto-Calvinism on request of administrator Frederick William. They were written in 1592, and first published in German in 1593.

Until 1836 all teachers and ministers in Electoral Saxony were required to subscribe also to the Visitation Articles as a doctrinal norm.
