= Treatise on the Power and Primacy of the Pope =

1537 work by Philip Melanchthon

The Treatise on the Power and Primacy of the Pope (1537) (Latin: Tractatus de Potestate et Primatu Papae), The Tractate for short, is the seventh Lutheran credal document of the Book of Concord. Philip Melanchthon, its author, completed it on 17 February 1537 during the assembly of princes and theologians in Smalcald.

The Tractate was ratified and subscribed by this assembly as an appendix to the Augsburg Confession, which did not have a specific article dealing with the office of the papacy. Defining their stance on the papacy was deemed important by the Lutherans as they faced the impending church council that would ultimately meet as the Council of Trent. The Tractate historically was considered part of Luther's Smalcald Articles because both documents came out of the Smalcald assembly and the Tractate was placed after the Smalcald Articles in the Book of Concord.

== Contents ==
Melanchthon used much the same rhetorical style in The Tractate as he did in the Apology of the Augsburg Confession (1531): both were originally written in Latin. Melanchthon used biblical and patristic material to present and support three main points:

- 1) The Pope is not head of the Christian Church and superior to all other bishops by divine right (de iure divino).
- 2) The Pope and bishops do not hold civil authority by divine right.
- 3) The claim of the Bull Unam sanctam (1302) that obedience to the Pope is necessary for salvation is invalid since it contradicts the doctrine of justification by faith.

Melancthon himself held these views to be conditional. Should the Pope renounce his claims to power by Divine Right, he could nevertheless maintain them for the sake of good order in the church by human right. Luther's position that the claims of the papacy undermine the Gospel is set forth in this treatise as the position of the Lutheran laity and clergy, and it achieved "confessional" or "symbolic" status rather quickly: the authoritative teaching of what would become the evangelical Lutheran Church.

== Bibliography ==
- Bente, Friedrich. Historical Introductions to the Book of Concord. (1921) New reprint edition. St. Louis: Concordia Publishing House, 1995. ISBN 0-570-03262-8 View excerpt here.
- Fagerberg, Holsten. A New Look at the Lutheran Confessions (1529-1537). Gene Lund, trans. Paperback Edition. St. Louis: Concordia Publishing House, 1988. ISBN 0-570-04499-5
- Forell, George W. The Augsburg Confession: A Contemporary Commentary. Minneapolis: Augsburg Publishing House, 1968. LOC 68-25798
- Grane, Lief, The Augsburg Confession: A Commentary. translated by John H. Rasmussen. Minneapolis, Augsburg Publishing House, 1986. ISBN 0-8066-2252-0
- Kolb, Robert and James A. Nestingen, eds. Sources and Contexts of the Book of Concord. Minneapolis: Fortress Press, 2001. ISBN 0-8006-3290-7
- Preus, Jacob A.O. The Second Martin: The Life and Theology of Martin Chemnitz. St. Louis: Concordia Publishing House, 2004.
- Preus, Robert D. and Wilbert H. Rosin, eds. A Contemporary Look at the Formula of Concord. St. Louis: Concordia Publishing House, 1978. ISBN 0-570-03271-7
- Preus, Robert D. Getting Into the Theology of Concord. Reprint. St. Louis: Concordia Publishing House, 2004.
- Preus, Robert D. Theology of Post-Reformation Lutheranism: Volume I. St. Louis: Concordia Publishing House, 1972. ISBN 0-570-04545-2
- Reu, Johann Michael. The Augsburg Confession. Reprint. St. Louis: Concordia Publishing House, 1995.
- Schlink, Edmund. Theology of the Lutheran Confessions. Translated by P. Koehneke and H. Bouman. St. Louis: Concordia Publishing House, Reprint 2004.
- Schmauk, Theodore. The Confessional Principle and the Confessions of the Lutheran Church. Translated by C. Theodore Benze. St. Louis: Concordia Publishing House, Reprint 2005.
- Wengert, Timothy J. A Formula for Parish Practice: Using the Formula of Concord in Congregations. Grand Rapids: Eerdmans Publishing, 2006. ISBN 0-8028-3026-9
