= A New Creed =

Affirmation of faith used by the United Church of Canada

"A New Creed" is an affirmation of faith used widely in the worship services of the United Church of Canada. It was originally adopted in 1968 by the 23rd General Council. Originally known as "A Contemporary Expression of Christian Faith", it began with the line "Man is not alone." It was amended in 1980 to make its language inclusive, and again in 1994 to add the words "to live with respect in Creation."

The creed is not meant to replace the ancient Apostles' Creed or the Nicene Creed, but to act as a supplement to these statements of faith. In practice very few United Church congregations use either of the traditional creeds.
