= Body of Doctrine =

Body of Doctrine (Latin: Corpus doctrinae) in Protestant theology of the 16th and 17th centuries is the anthology of the confessional or credal writings of a group of Christians with a common confession of faith.

It was a term first used by Philipp Melanchthon, a collection of whose confessional writings was published as the Corpus Doctrinae Philippicum or the Corpus Doctrinae Misnicum. Melanchthon had conceived the notion of assembling his most important theological writings, along with the ecumenical creeds, into a single book called a corpus doctrinae, or body of doctrine. The Leipzig printer, Ernst Vögelin, published it with Melanchthon's preface around the time of the reformer's death in April 1560.

These writings were used as the normative proclamation and teaching of that group or denomination of Christians. For Lutheranism in the mid—16th century these anthologies were formulated for the various duchies and principalities of the Holy Roman Empire. They were the prototype of the Book of Concord, which historically is considered by Lutherans to be their definitive Body of Doctrine. However, because some of the corpera doctrinæ were considered to be faulty and to avoid confusion of the Book of Concord with the Corpus doctrinæ Philippicum, the compilers of the Book of Concord deliberately refrained from using the designation corpus doctrinæ for it.
