= Formula of Concord =

Authoritative Lutheran statement of faith

The Formula of Concord (1577) (German: Konkordienformel; Latin: Formula concordiae; also the "Bergic Book" or the "Bergen Book") is an authoritative Lutheran statement of faith (called a confession, creed, or "symbol") that, in its two parts (Epitome and Solid Declaration), makes up the final section of the Lutheran Corpus Doctrinae or Body of Doctrine, known as the Book of Concord (most references to these texts are to the original edition of 1580).

The Epitome is a brief and concise presentation of the Formula's twelve articles; the Solid Declaration a detailed exposition. Approved doctrine is presented in "theses"; rejected doctrine in "antitheses." As the original document was written in German, a Latin translation was prepared for the Latin edition of the Book of Concord published in 1584.

== Significance and composition ==
The promulgation and subscription of this document was a major factor in the unification and preservation of Lutheranism. It was instigated at the behest of the Elector August of Saxony, and it was the joint work of a group of Lutheran theologians and churchmen of the latter sixteenth century. They met from April 9 to June 7, 1576 in Torgau, the seat of government of the Electorate of Saxony at the time.

They were Jakob Andreä (1528–1590), Martin Chemnitz (1522–1586), Nikolaus Selnecker (1528–1592), David Chytraeus (1531–1600), Andreas Musculus (1514–1581), Christoph Körner (1518–1594), Caspar Heyderich (1517–1586), Paul Crell (1532–1579), Maximilian Mörlin (1516–1584), Wolfgang Harder (1522–1602), Daniel Gräser (1504–1591), Nicholas Jagenteufel (1520–1583), Johannes Cornicaelius, John Schütz (1531–1584), Martin Mirus (1532–1593), Georg Listenius (1532–1596), and Peter Glaser (1528–1583).

A subset of this group (Andreä, Chemnitz, Selnecker, Chytraeus, Musculus, and Körner) worked on the document a year later in Bergen Abbey, near Magdeburg, from March 1 to 14, and in May, 1577. The most important formulators of the Formula of Concord were Jakob Andreä and Martin Chemnitz.

Having before them two earlier documents (the Swabian-Saxon Concord, drafted by Andreä in 1574 and the so-called Maulbron Formula of 1576) the first group of theologians produced the Torgau Book. Andreä condensed this into what would become known as the Epitome, the first part of the Formula of Concord. Its title as found in the 1576 first printing ran as follows: [A] Brief Summary of the articles which, controverted among the theologians of the Augsburg Confession for many years, were settled in a Christian manner at Torgau in the month of June, 1576, by the theologians which there met and subscribed.

Over the eleven months following the publication of the Torgau Book, suggested emendations were sent to Andreä and Chemnitz, and further revision was deemed necessary, so the second group (Andreä, Chemnitz, Selnecker, Chytraeus, Musculus, and Körner) revised the Torgau Book into its final form, known as the Bergen Book or the Solid Declaration of the Formula of Concord. (Depending on the translation, the Solid Declaration is also known as the Thorough Declaration of the Formula of Concord.) It was presented to Elector August of Saxony on May 28, 1577.

Subsequently, it was signed (subscribed to) by three electors of the Holy Roman Empire, twenty dukes and princes, twenty-four counts, four barons, thirty-five free imperial cities, and over 8,000 pastors. These constituted two-thirds of the Lutheran Church in Germany at the time. Every clergyman in the Electorate of Saxony had to either subscribe or write his objections with respect to the Formula of Concord. A rhyme was circulated at the time: "Write, dear Sir, write, that you might remain at the parish" (German: Schreibt, lieber Herre, schreibt, dass Ihr bei der Pfarre bleibt).

The Formula of Concord was not accepted by Lutherans in Hesse, Zweibrücken, Anhalt, Pommerania, Holstein, Denmark-Norway, Sweden, Nuremberg, Strassburg, and Magdeburg, and the government of Queen Elizabeth I of England lobbied in its German embassies to prevent its acceptance among the German estates.

== Articles of the Formula of Concord ==
- I. Original Sin
- II. Free Will
- III. The Righteousness of Faith before God
- IV. Good Works
- V. Law and Gospel
- VI. The Third Use of the Law
- VII. The Holy Supper of Christ
- VIII. The Person of Christ
- IX. Christ's Descent into Hell
- X. Church Ceremonies (Adiaphora, or Indifferent Things)
- XI. The Eternal Foreknowledge and Election of God
- XII. Other heresies and sects
