= Ernst Vögelin =

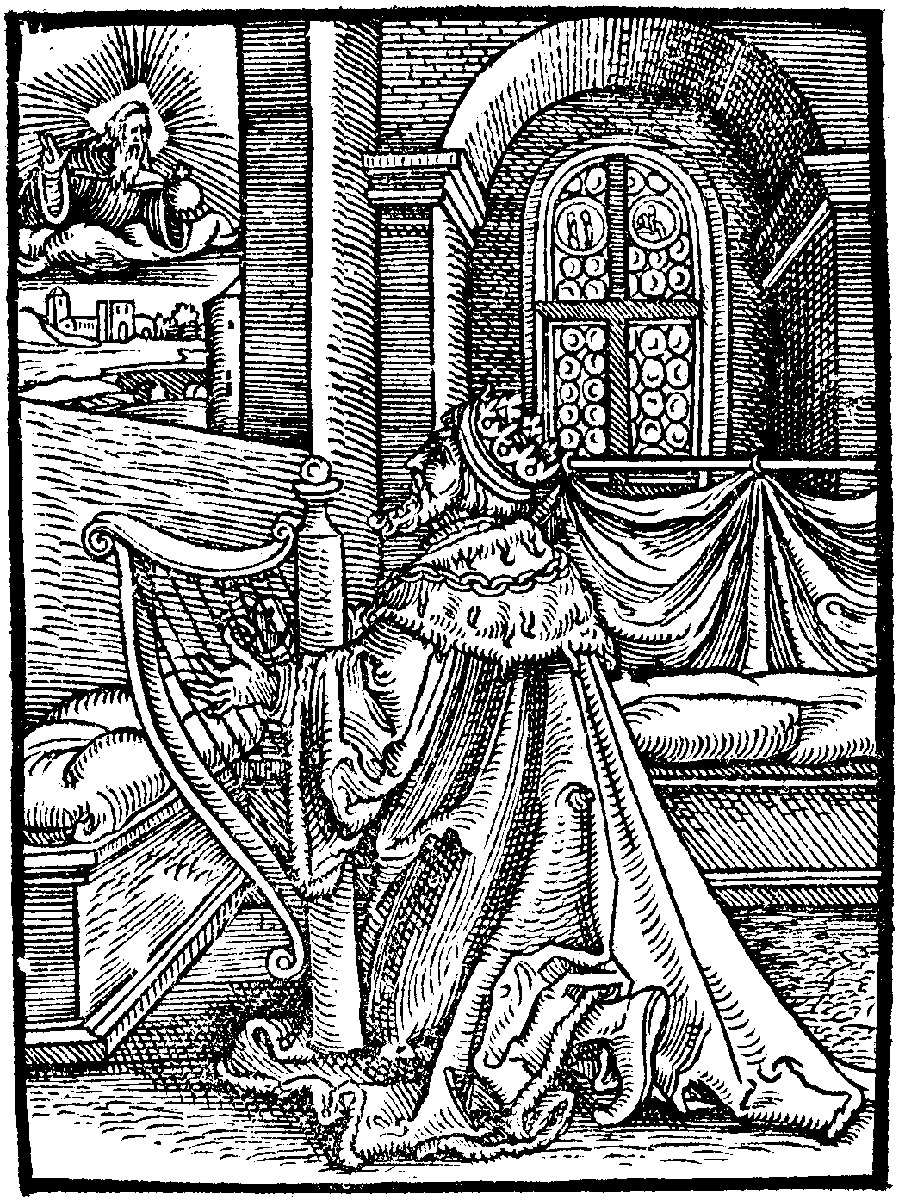
An illustration from a 1581 book printed by Vögelin

Ernst Vögelin (August 10, 1529 – 1589) was a 16th-century German pioneer book printer.

Vögelin was born in Konstanz. He studied in Leipzig, married a daughter of the first Leipzig printer Valentin Bapst, took over his shop, and expanded the establishment with a type foundry, publishing house, and a bookstore. By 1559 it has become the largest print shop in eastern Germany. Heavily indebted and accused of Calvinism, Vögelin had to leave the town in 1576. Since 1579 he was in Neustadt. His shop was later run by his sons, Gothard, Philip and Walentin. His successors' shop in Heidelberg, was first to print Johannes Kepler's Astronomia Nova.

Ernst Vögelin's notable printings include the Protestant Corpus doctrinae under the title Corpus doctrinae christianae.
