= Ecumenical creeds =

Three creeds in Lutheran tradition

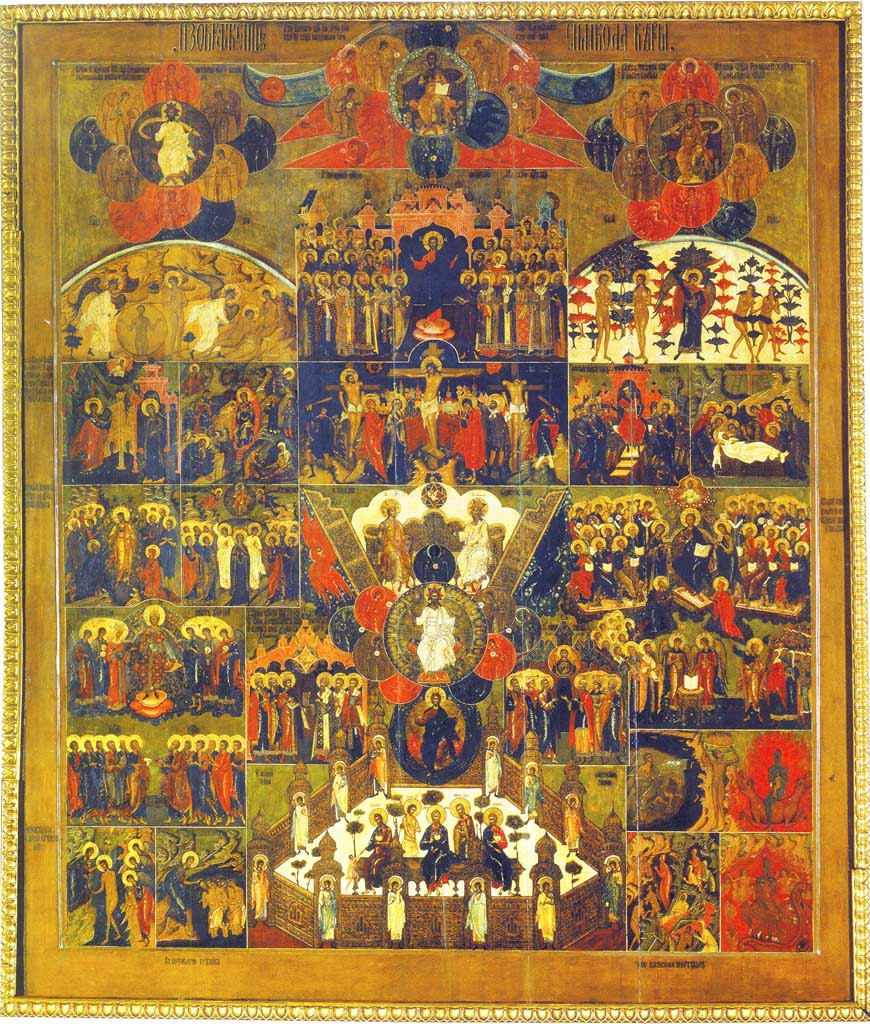
Russian icon representing the Nicene Creed, 17th century

Ecumenical creeds is an umbrella term used in Lutheran tradition to refer to three creeds: the Nicene Creed, the Apostles' Creed and the Athanasian Creed. These creeds are also known as the catholic or universal creeds.

These creeds are accepted by almost all mainstream Christian denominations in the West, including Lutheran, Reformed, Catholic, and Anglican. Many Methodist churches accept the Nicene Creed and Apostles' Creed. Within Evangelicalism, the importance of the creeds is greatly diminished, as personal study of scripture is emphasized; they may be continued to be used within a liturgical context or completely dispensed with, depending on the denomination.

The Eastern Orthodox Church accepts the Nicene Creed, but does not use the Apostles' Creed or the Athanasian Creed.

A creed by definition is a summary or statement of what one believes. It originates from the Latin credo meaning "I believe". The purpose of a creed is to act as a yardstick of correct belief. A creed is an epitome, not a full definition, of what is required for orthodoxy. It was hoped that by memorizing this summary of the faith, lay people without extensive theological training would still be able to recognize deviations from orthodox doctrines based on the Bible as interpreted in Christian tradition.

The term ecumenical can refer to efforts by Christians of different church traditions to develop closer relationships and better understandings. The term is also often used to refer to efforts towards the visible and organic unity of different Christian churches in some form.

== See also ==
- List of Christian creeds
- Filioque
- Ecumenical council
