= George Forell =

George Wolfgang Forell
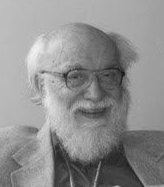
- In 2008
- Born: September 19, 1919; Breslau, Germany
- Died: April 29, 2011 (aged 91)
- Education: Lutheran Theological Seminary at Philadelphia (TH.B.); Princeton Theological Seminary; Union Theological Seminary (TH.D.)
- Occupations: Theologian, scholar, philosopher, author, lecturer
- Known for: Lutheranism, Christian ethics
- Spouse: Elizabeth (née Rossing) Forell
- Children: Madeleine; Mary
- Parent(s): Friedrich and Maria (née Kretschmar) Forell
- Relatives: Gotthold Karl Johannes Forell (brother, died 1961)

George Wolfgang Forell (September 19, 1919 – April 29, 2011) was the Carver Distinguished Chair of Religion in the Department of Religious Studies at the University of Iowa. He was a scholar, author, and lecturer in the field of Christian ethics.

== Early life and education ==
Forell was born on September 19, 1919, in Breslau, Germany (now Wrocław, Poland). His father was Frederik J. Forell, co-founder of The Christian Social Services. He studied philosophy and theology at the University of Vienna. In 1939 he came to the United States as a refugee from Nazi Germany. He enrolled at the Lutheran Theological Seminary at Philadelphia as a student in theology. After graduating in 1941, he was ordained as a Lutheran minister. While serving as a parish pastor, he continued his education at Princeton Theological Seminary and Union Theological Seminary. In 1949 he received a Th.D. from Union Theological Seminary.

== Academic career ==
Forell joined Gustavus Adolphus College in St. Peter, Minnesota, as a professor of philosophy in 1949. In 1954, he moved to the University of Iowa as a professor of religion. In 1958–59 he served as guest-professor at the University of Hamburg, Germany. He was Director of the Department of Religious Studies at The University of Iowa from 1966 to 1971. In 1973, he was named Carver Distinguished Professor of Religion. Forell was a past president of the American Society for Reformation Research. Forell also served as a Professor of Systematic Theology at the Chicago Lutheran Theological Seminary in Maywood, Illinois (now part of the Lutheran School of Theology at Chicago) After his retirement from the University of Iowa in 1989, he lectured for extended periods of time in seminaries in Tokyo, Taiwan, Hong Kong, and other academic institutions in Asia and Europe.

== Family and personal life ==
In 1945, he married Elizabeth Rossing in Argyle, Wisconsin. They have two daughters, Madeleine Forell Marshall and Mary Forell Davis, four grandchildren and seven great-grandchildren.

== Recognition ==
He received honorary degrees from Gustavus Adolphus College, Wartburg Theological Seminary, Luther College and Upsala College. In 1984, a Festschrift, Piety, Politics and Ethics, edited by Carter Lindberg, was published. Forell was named the distinguished alum for 2002 from the Lutheran Theological Seminary at Philadelphia.

== Selected works ==
- Faith Active in Love, 1954
- Ethics of Decision: An Introduction to Christian Ethics, 1956
- The Protestant Faith, 1960
- Understanding the Nicene Creed, 1965
- The Augsburg Confession: A Contemporary Commentary. Augsburg Publishing House, 1968. ISBN 0806608153
- History of Christian Ethics, 1975
- Martin Luther, Theologian of the Church: Collected Essays, 1994
- "Theology in Exile: A Personal Account" by George Wolfgang Forell (1919-2011) Translated by Carter Lindberg, Lutheran Quarterly 29 (2015), 304-311
