= Smalcald Articles =

Summary of Lutheran doctrine

The Smalcald Articles or Schmalkald Articles (German: Schmalkaldische Artikel) are a summary of Lutheran doctrine, written by Martin Luther in 1537 for a meeting of the Schmalkaldic League in preparation for an intended ecumenical Council of the Church.

== History ==
The Schmalkaldic League was organized in 1531 as a union of various Lutheran territories and cities, to provide a united military and political front against Roman Catholic politicians and armies, led by Holy Roman Emperor Charles V. Luther's patron, Elector John Frederick of Saxony, asked him to prepare these articles for League's meeting in 1537, held in Schmalkalden in Thuringia, Germany.

When the Schmalkaldic League met, Luther was taken very ill with a severe case of kidney stones and so was unable to attend the meeting. The league ultimately decided not to adopt the articles Luther had written. They were influenced in this by Philipp Melanchthon, who was concerned that Luther's writing would be regarded as divisive by some. Melanchthon was asked to write a clear statement on the papacy and this he did, a document that was adopted at the meeting as the Treatise on the Power and Primacy of the Pope.

In the Smalcald Articles, Luther summarized what he considered to be the most significant teachings of Christianity. He held the Articles in high regard and insisted that they be included in his last will and testament. Though they were not adopted at the meeting of the Schmalkaldic League in 1537, most of the theologians present at that meeting subscribed to them. Parts of Hesse accepted them as confessional writing in 1544 and in the 1550s, the Smalcald Articles were used authoritatively by many Gnesio-Lutherans as well as being incorporated into corpora doctrinae during the following 20 years. In 1580, the text was accepted as a confessional document in the Book of Concord.

== First article ==
The first and chief article is this: Jesus Christ, our God and Lord, died for our sins and was raised again for our justification (Romans 3:24–25). He alone is the Lamb of God who takes away the sins of the world (John 1:29), and God has laid on Him the iniquity of us all (Isaiah 53:6). All have sinned and are justified freely, without their own works and merits, by His grace (Eph 2:8-9), through the redemption that is in Christ Jesus, in His blood (Romans 3:23–28). This is necessary to believe. This cannot be otherwise acquired or grasped by any work, law, or merit. Therefore, it is clear and certain that this faith alone justifies us… Nothing of this article can be yielded or surrendered, even though heaven and earth and everything else falls (Mark 13:31)

== Translations ==
The Smalcald Articles are available in the following translations:

- Bente, F., translator and editor. Concordia Triglotta. St. Louis: Concordia Publishing House, 1921.
- Kolb, Robert and Timothy J. Wengert, eds. The Book of Concord: The Confessions of the Evangelical Lutheran Church. Minneapolis: Fortress Press, 2000. ISBN 0-8006-2740-7
- McCain, Paul T., Robert C. Baker, Gene Edward Veith, and Edward A. Engelbrecht, eds. Concordia: The Lutheran Confessions — A Reader's Edition of the Book of Concord. St. Louis: Concordia Publishing House, 2005. ISBN 0-7586-0806-3
- Tappert, Theodore G., ed. The Book of Concord: The Confessions of the Evangelical Lutheran Church. Philadelphia: Fortress Press, 1959. ISBN 0-8006-0825-9

== Bibliography ==
- Bente, Friedrich. Historical Introductions to the Book of Concord. (1921) Reprint. St. Louis: Concordia Publishing House, 1965. ISBN 0-570-03262-8
- Russell, William (1995). Luther's Theological Testament: The Schmalkald Articles. Minneapolis: Fortress Press.
