= Martin Luther =

German priest, theologian and author (1483–1546)

The Reverend Martin Luther OSA
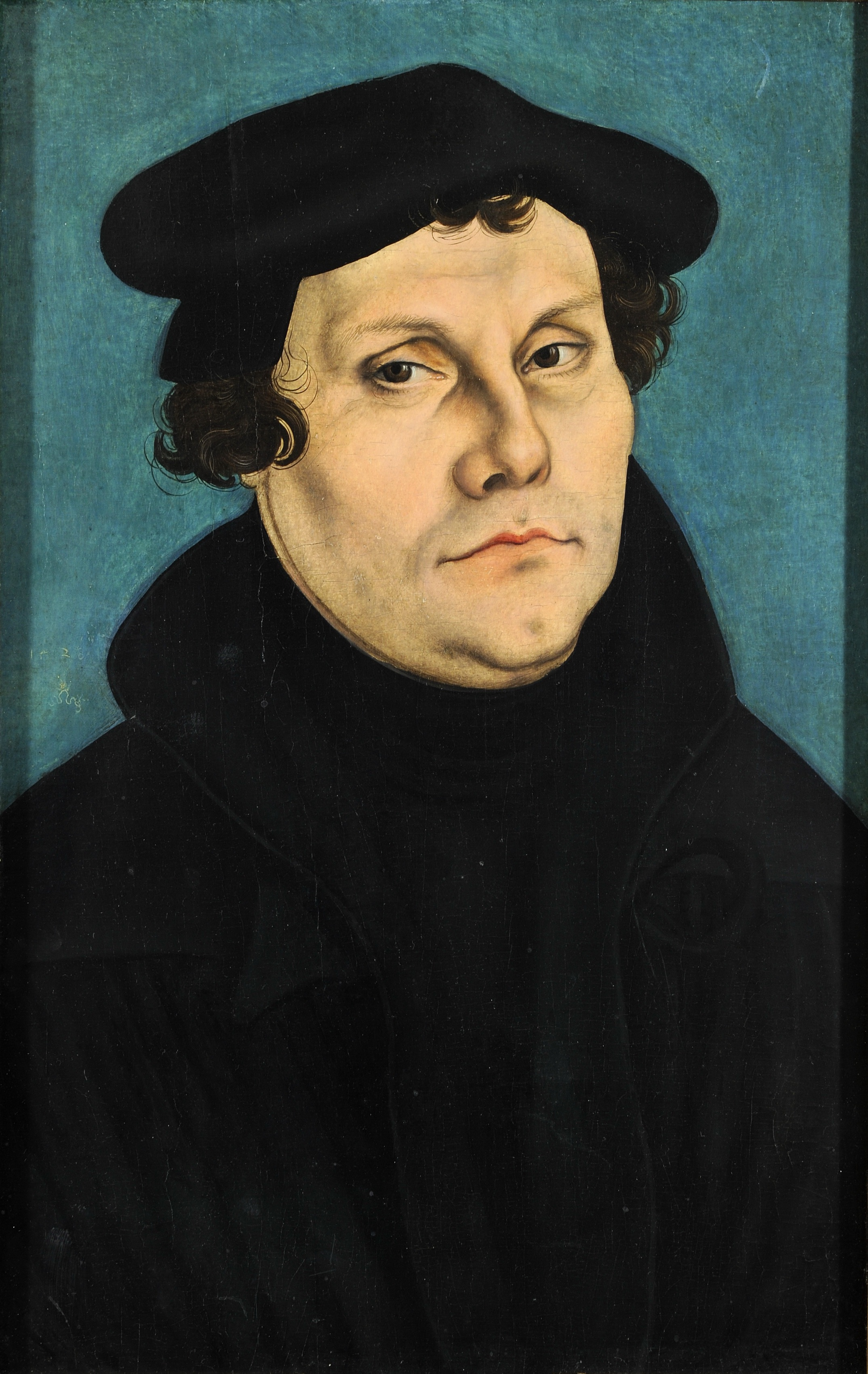
- Portrait of Martin Luther, 1528
- Born: Martin Luder; 10 November 1483; Eisleben, County of Mansfeld, Holy Roman Empire
- Died: 18 February 1546 (aged 62); Eisleben, County of Mansfeld, Holy Roman Empire
- Education: University of Erfurt (Artium Baccalaureus, 1502; Artium Magister, 1505); University of Wittenberg (Biblicus Baccalaureus in Bible, 1508; Sententiarius Baccalaureus in Sentences, 1509; Theologiæ Doctor in Bible, 1512)
- Title: Priest; Theologian; Author; Hymnwriter
- Spouse: Katharina von Bora (m. 1525)
- Children: Hans (Johannes); Elisabeth; Magdalena; Martin; Paul; Margarethe

Religious life
- Religion: Christianity
- Denomination: Protestant (Lutheran)

Ordination history
History
Diaconal ordination
- Ordained by: Johannes (or Johann) Bonemilch von Laasphe, Auxiliary Bishop of the Metropolitan Archdiocese of Mainz
- Date: 27 February 1507
- Place: Cathedral Church of St. Mary, Erfurt, Holy Roman Empire
Priestly ordination
- Ordained by: Hieronymus (or Jerome) Schultz OPraem, Bishop of the Diocese of Brandenburg
- Date: 3/4 April 1507
- Place: Cathedral Church of St. Mary, Erfurt, Holy Roman Empire

Martin Luther (/ˈluːθər/ LOO-thər; German: [ˈmaʁtiːn ˈlʊtɐ]; 10 November 1483 (Note: Luther himself, however, believed that he had been born in 1484.) – 18 February 1546) was a German priest, theologian, author, hymnwriter, professor, and former Augustinian friar. (Note: Luther consistently referred to himself as a former monk. For example: "Thus formerly, when I was a monk, I used to hope that I would be able to pacify my conscience with the fastings, the praying, and the vigils with which I used to afflict my body in a way to excite pity. But the more I sweat, the less quiet and peace I felt; for the true light had been removed from my eyes.") Luther was the seminal figure of the Protestant Reformation, and his theological beliefs form the basis of Lutheranism. He is considered one of the most influential figures in Western and Christian history.

Born in Eisleben, Luther was ordained to the priesthood in 1507. He came to reject various teachings and practices of the Roman Catholic Church, in particular the view on indulgences and papal authority. Luther initiated an international debate on these in works like his Ninety-five Theses, which he authored in 1517. In 1520 Pope Leo X demanded that Luther renounce all of his writings, and when Luther refused to do so, excommunicated him in January 1521. Later that year the Holy Roman Emperor, Charles V, condemned Luther as an outlaw at the Diet of Worms. At the time of Luther's death in 1546, his excommunication was still in effect.

Luther taught that justification is not earned by any human acts or intents or merit. He preached it instead is received only as the free gift of God's grace through the believer's faith in Jesus. Luther held that good works were a necessary fruit of living faith, part of the process of sanctification. Luther's theology challenged the authority and office of the pope and bishops by teaching that the Bible is the only source of divinely revealed knowledge on the Gospel. Those who identify with these, as well as Luther's wider teachings, are called Lutherans, although Luther insisted on Christian or Evangelical (German: evangelisch), as the only acceptable names for persons who professed Christ. Luther's translation of the Bible into German (1534) made the Bible vastly more accessible to the laity, which had a tremendous impact on both the Church and German culture. It fostered the development of a standard version of the German language, added several principles to the art of translation, and influenced the writing of an English translation, the Tyndale Bible. His hymns influenced the development of singing in Protestant churches. His marriage to Katharina von Bora, a former nun, set a model for the practice of clerical marriage, allowing Protestant clergy to marry.

Luther expressed staunchly antisemitic views, calling for the expulsion of Jews and the burning of synagogues. (Note: See also Hillerbrand, Hans (2003). "The legacy of Martin Luther". In Hillerbrand, Hans; McKim, Donald K. (eds.). The Cambridge Companion to Luther. Cambridge University Press. Archived from the original on 16 July 2011.)

In 1523, Luther wrote that Jesus Christ was born a Jew which discouraged mistreatment of the Jews and advocated their conversion by proving that the Old Testament could be shown to speak of Jesus Christ. However, as the Reformation grew, Luther began to lose hope in large-scale Jewish conversion to Christianity, and in the years his health deteriorated he grew more acerbic toward the Jews, writing against them with the kind of venom he had already unleashed on the Anabaptists, Zwingli, and the pope. These works also targeted Roman Catholics, Anabaptists, and nontrinitarian Christians. While Luther did not advocate the murder of Jews, some historians contend that his rhetoric encouraged antisemitism in Germany and the emergence, centuries later, of the Nazi Party. (Note: For similar views, see: Berger, Ronald J. (2002). Fathoming the Holocaust: A Social Problems Approach. New York: Aldine De Gruyter. p. 28. ISBN 9780202306698.; Rose, Paul Lawrence. "Revolutionary Antisemitism in Germany from Kant to Wagner", (Princeton University Press, 1990), quoted in Berger 2002, p. 28; Shirer, William. The Rise and Fall of the Third Reich, (New York: Simon & Schuster, 1960).; Johnson, Paul. A History of the Jews (New York: HarperCollins Publishers, 1987), 242.; Poliakov, Leon. History of Anti-Semitism: From the Time of Christ to the Court Jews. (N.P.: University of Pennsylvania Press, 2003), 216.; Berenbaum, Michael. The World Must Know. (Baltimore: Johns Hopkins University Press and the United States Holocaust Memorial Museum, 1993, 2000), 8–9.)

== Early life and education ==
=== Birth and early life ===
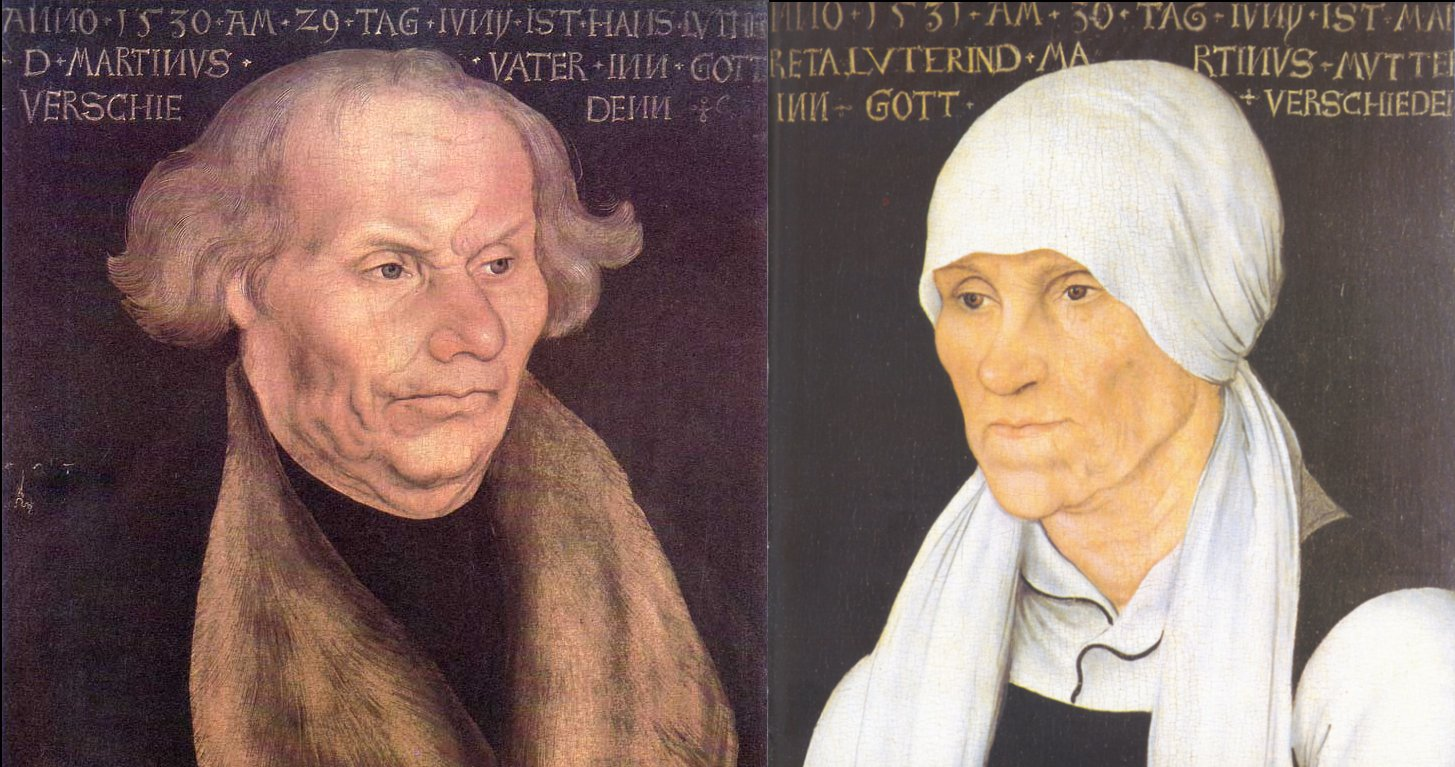
Portraits of Luther's parents, Hans and Margarethe Luther, by Lucas Cranach the Elder in 1527

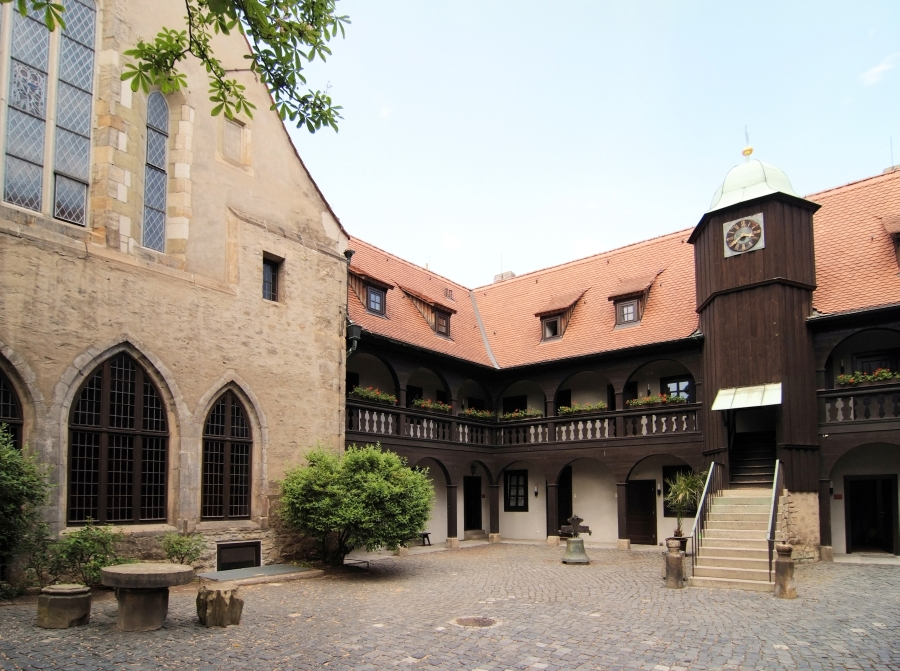
In July 1505, Luther entered St. Augustine's Monastery in Erfurt

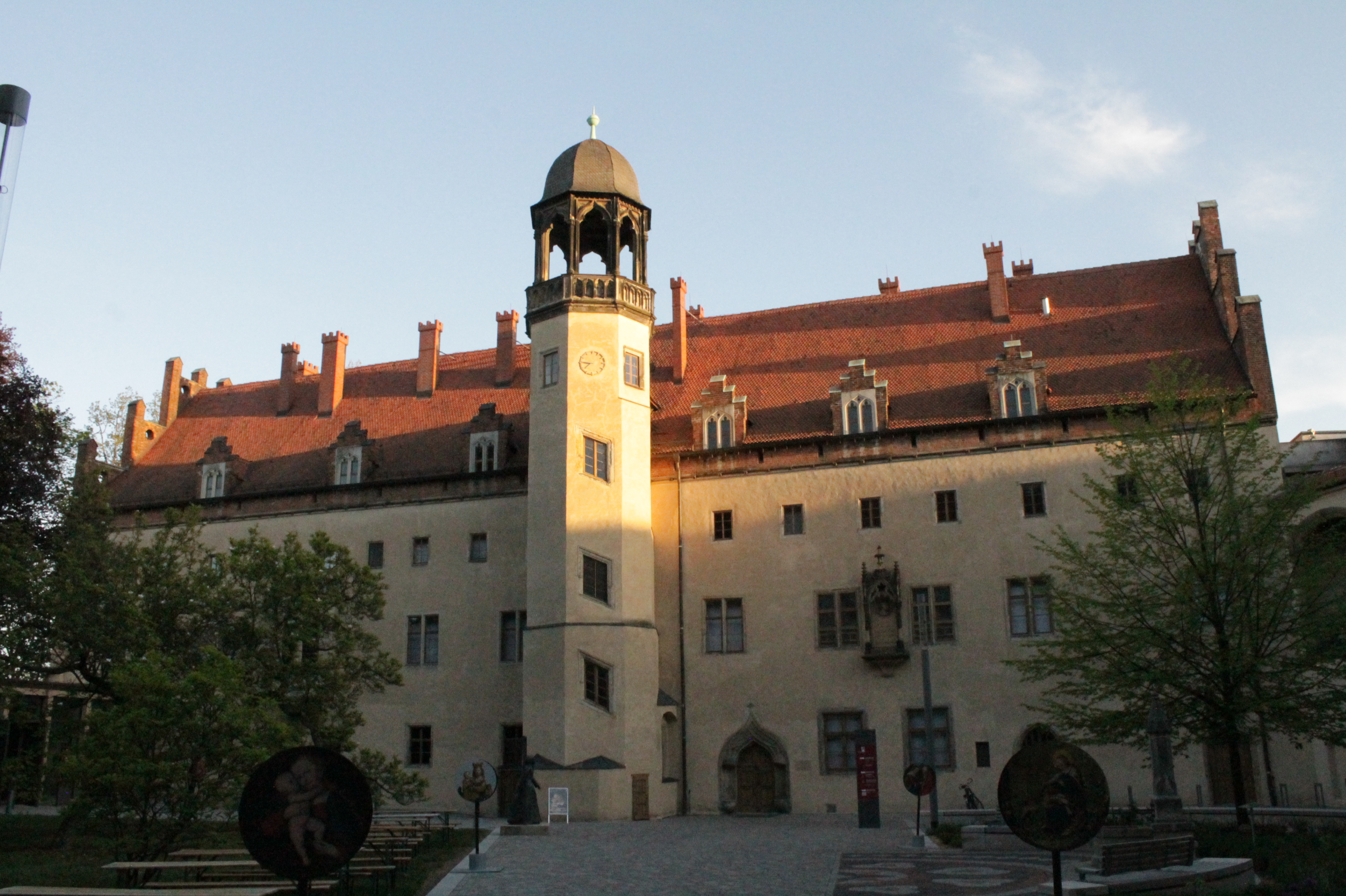
Luther's residence at the University of Wittenberg, where he began teaching theology in 1508

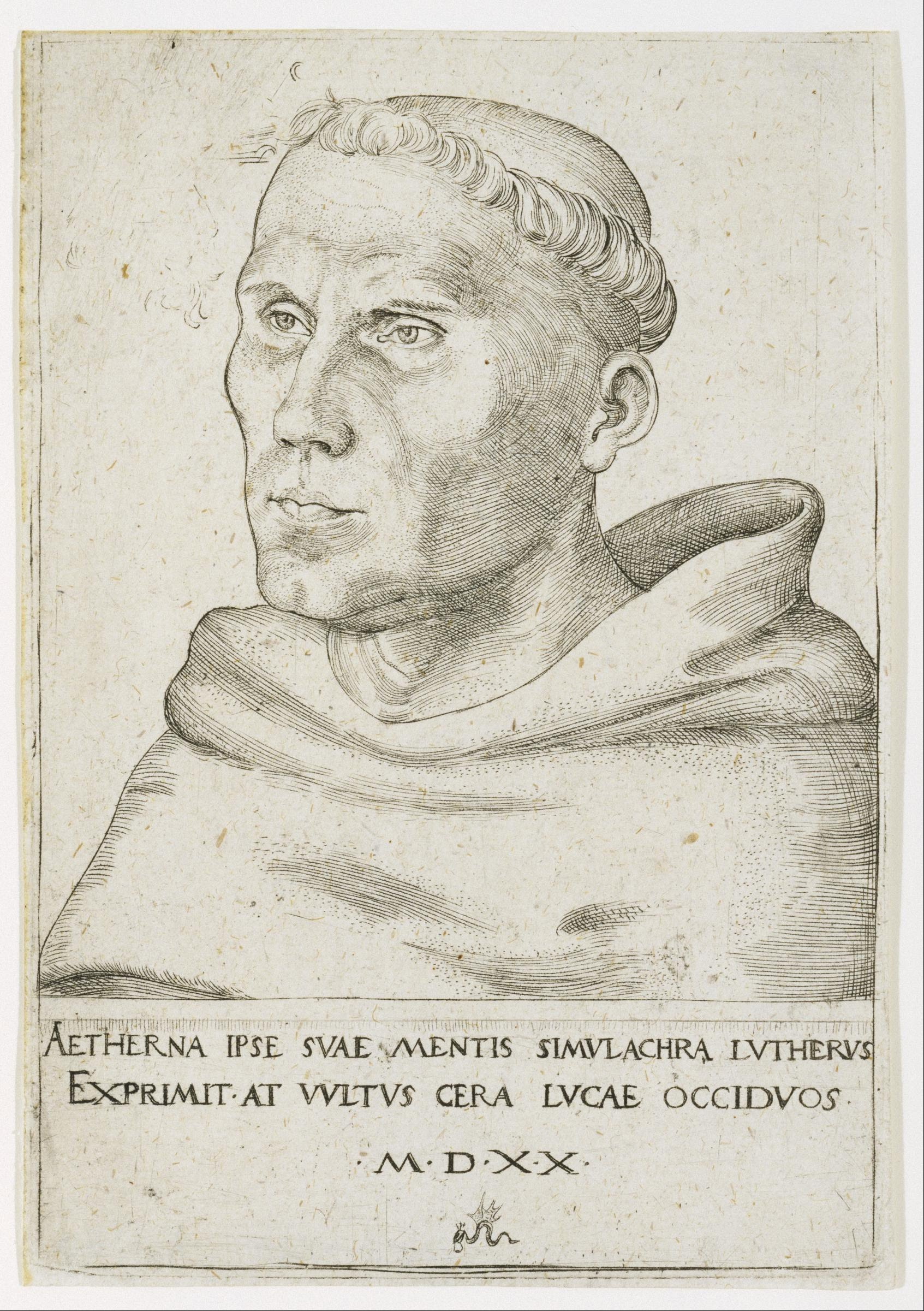
A 1520 engraving of Luther as a friar with a tonsure

Martin Luther was born on 10 November 1483 to Hans Luder (or Ludher, later Luther) and his wife Margarethe (née Lindemann) in Eisleben, County of Mansfeld, in the Holy Roman Empire. Luther was baptised the next morning on the feast day of Martin of Tours.

In 1484 his family moved to Mansfeld, where his father was a leaseholder of copper mines and smelters and served as one of four citizen representatives on the local council; in 1492 he was elected as a town councillor. The Lutheran scholar Martin E. Marty describes Luther's mother as a hard-working woman of "trading-class stock and middling means", contrary to Luther's enemies, who labelled her a whore and bath attendant.

Luther had several brothers and sisters and is known to have been close to one of them, Jakob.

=== Education ===
Hans was determined to see Martin, his eldest son, become a lawyer. He sent him to Latin schools in Mansfeld, then Magdeburg in 1497, where he attended the Brethren of the Common Life, a school operated by a lay group, and Eisenach in 1498. The three schools focused on the trivium: grammar, logic and rhetoric. Luther later compared his education there to purgatory and hell.

In 1501, at age 17, Luther entered the University of Erfurt, which he later described as a beer house and whorehouse. He was made to wake at 4 am for "a day of rote learning and often wearying spiritual exercises." He received his master's degree in 1505.

In accordance with his father's wishes, Luther enrolled in law, but dropped out almost immediately, believing that law was an uncertain profession. Luther instead sought assurances about life and was drawn to theology and philosophy, expressing interest in Aristotle, William of Ockham, and Gabriel Biel. He was deeply influenced by two tutors, Bartholomaeus Arnoldi von Usingen and Jodocus Trutfetter, who taught him to be suspicious of even the greatest thinkers and to test everything himself by experience.

Philosophy proved to be unsatisfying to Luther because it offered assurance about the use of reason but none about loving God, which Luther believed was more important. Reason could not lead men to God, Luther felt, and he thereafter developed a love-hate relationship with Aristotle over Aristotle's emphasis on reason. For Luther, reason could be used to question men and institutions, but not God. Human beings could learn about God only through divine revelation, he believed, leading him to view scripture as increasingly important.

== Monastic and academic career ==
There are two stories told of Luther's sudden decision to become a monk: Melancthon's story is that Luther was shocked by the sudden death of a university friend, Hieronimus Buntz. The cause of this death has been variously speculated as lightning, plague, pleurisy, or even that Luther killed him in a duel.

The other story is that on 2 July 1505, while Luther was returning to university on horseback following a trip home, a lightning bolt struck near him during a thunderstorm. He later told his father that he was terrified of death and divine judgement, and he cried out, "Help! Saint Anna, I will become a monk!" He came to view his cry for help as a vow that he could never break. He withdrew from the university, sold his books, and entered St Augustine's Monastery in Erfurt on 17 July 1505. One friend blamed the decision on Luther's sadness over the deaths of two friends. Luther himself seemed saddened by the move. Those who attended a farewell supper walked him to the door of the Black Cloister. "This day you see me, and then, not ever again", he said. His father was furious over what he saw as a waste of Luther's education.

=== Augustinian friar ===
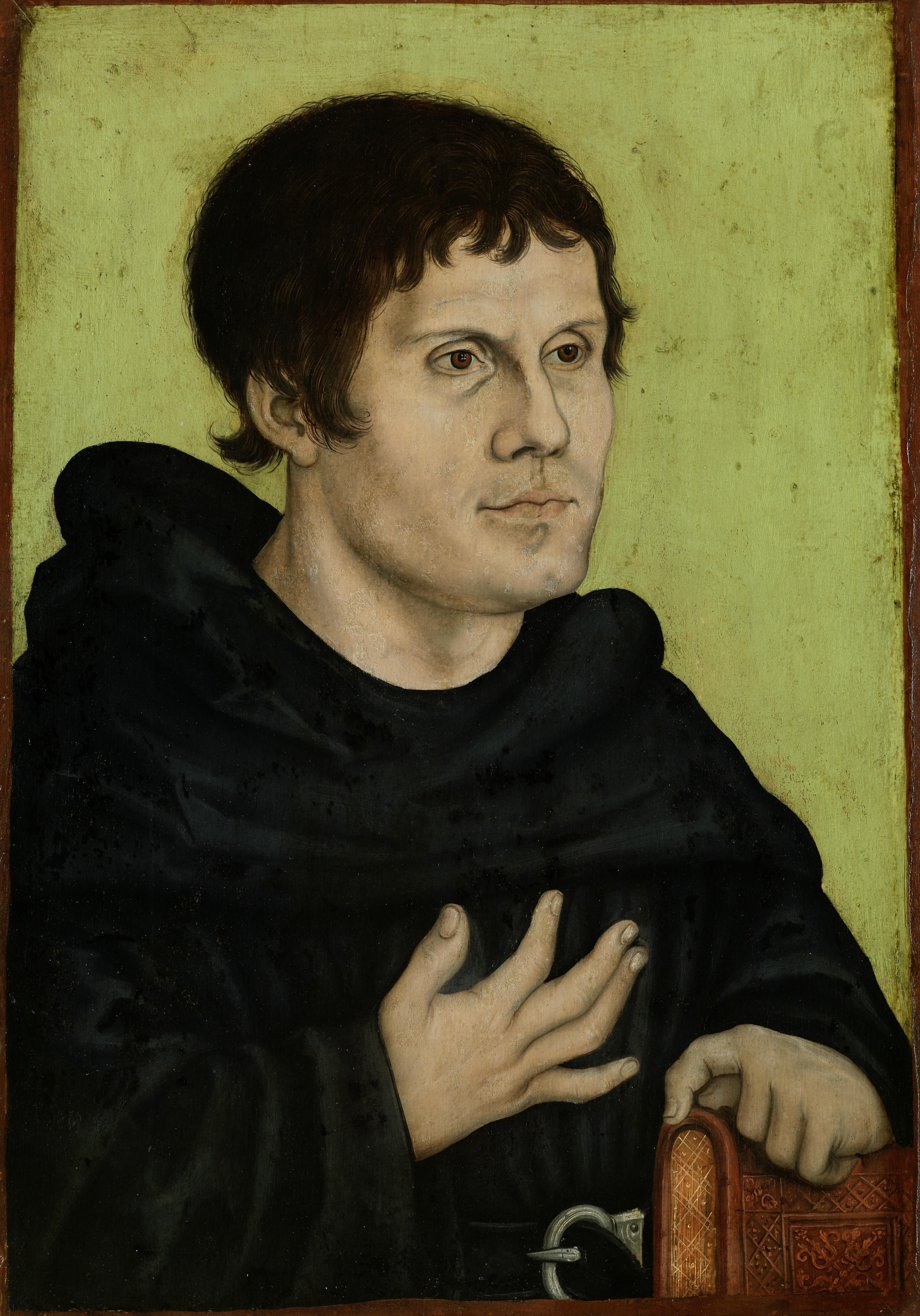
A posthumous portrait of Luther as an Augustinian friar

Luther dedicated himself to the Augustinian order, devoting himself to fasting, long hours in prayer, pilgrimage, and frequent confession.

Luther described this period of his life as one of deep spiritual despair. He said, "I lost touch with Christ the Savior and Comforter, and made of him the jailer and hangman of my poor soul." Johann von Staupitz, his superior and frustrated confessor, concluded that Luther needed more work to distract him from excessive introspection and ordered him to pursue an academic career.

On 3 April 1507, Jerome Schultz, the Bishop of Brandenburg, ordained Luther in Erfurt Cathedral.

=== University of Wittenberg ===
The following year, in 1508, Luther began teaching theology at the University of Wittenberg. He received two bachelor's degrees, one in biblical studies on 9 March 1508, and another in the Sentences by Peter Lombard in 1509. On 19 October 1512, he was awarded his Doctor of Theology.

On 21 October 1512, Luther was received into the senate of the theological faculty of the University of Wittenberg, succeeding von Staupitz as chair of theology. He spent the rest of his career in this position at Wittenberg.

In 1515 Luther was made provincial vicar of Saxony and Thuringia, which required him to visit and oversee eleven monasteries in his province.

== Later life and the Reformation ==
=== Lectures on Psalms and justification by faith ===
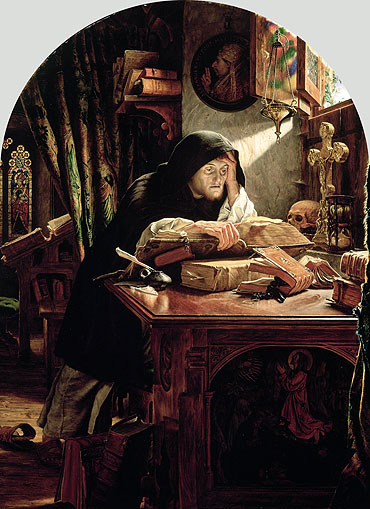
Luther at Erfurt, an 1861 portrait by Joseph Noel Paton depicting Luther discovering the doctrine of sola fide (by faith alone)

From 1510 to 1520, Luther lectured on the Psalms, and on the books of Hebrews, Romans, and Galatians. As he studied these portions of the Bible, partly with Erasmus' new annotated translation, he came to view the use of terms such as penance and righteousness by the Church in new ways. He became convinced that the Church was corrupt and had lost sight of what he saw as several of the central truths of Christianity.

The most important for Luther was the doctrine of justification—God's act of declaring a sinner righteous—by faith alone through God's grace. He began to teach that salvation or redemption is a gift of God's grace, attainable only through faith in Jesus as the Messiah. "This one and firm rock, which we call the doctrine of justification", he writes, "is the chief article of the whole Christian doctrine, which comprehends the understanding of all godliness." Luther's use of justification by faith has been called his "macro-hermeneutical presupposition for biblical interpretation and theological construction."

Luther came to understand justification as entirely the work of God. This teaching by Luther was clearly expressed in his 1525 publication On the Bondage of the Will, which was written in response to On Free Will by Erasmus (1524), who believed Luther's early teaching on the necessity of evil was unbiblical. Against the Catholic and Orthodox teaching that the righteous acts of believers are performed in co-operation with God's preceding grace (synergism), Luther wrote that Christians receive such righteousness entirely from outside themselves (monergism). Taking Erasmus' earlier Latin translation choice to an extreme, he taught that righteousness not only comes from Christ but actually is the righteousness of Christ, imputed to Christians (rather than also infused into them) through faith: "That is why faith alone makes someone just and fulfills the law", he writes. "Faith is that which brings the Holy Spirit through the merits of Christ." Faith, for Luther, was a gift from God; the experience of being justified by faith was "as though I had been born again." His entry into paradise, no less, was a discovery about "the righteousness of God"—a discovery that "the just person" of whom the Bible speaks (as in Romans 1:17) lives by faith. He explains his concept of "justification" in the Smalcald Articles:

The first and chief article is this: Jesus Christ, our God and Lord, died for our sins and was raised again for our justification (Romans 3:24–25). He alone is the Lamb of God who takes away the sins of the world (John 1:29), and God has laid on Him the iniquity of us all (Isaiah 53:6). All have sinned and are justified freely, without their own works and merits, by His grace, through the redemption that is in Christ Jesus, in His blood (Romans 3:23–25). This is necessary to believe. This cannot be otherwise acquired or grasped by any work, law, or merit. Therefore, it is clear and certain that this faith alone justifies us ... Nothing of this article can be yielded or surrendered, even though heaven and earth and everything else falls (Mark 13:31).

— Martin Luther, Smalcald Articles

=== Start of the Reformation: 1516–1517 ===
The Catholic sale of indulgences shown in A Question to a Mintmaker, a woodcut by Jörg Breu the Elder of Augsburg, c. 1530

In 1516, Johann Tetzel, a Dominican friar, was sent to Germany by the Roman Catholic Church to sell indulgences to raise money in order to rebuild St Peter's Basilica in Rome. Tetzel's experiences as a preacher of indulgences, especially between 1503 and 1510, led to his appointment as general commissioner by Albert of Brandenburg, Archbishop of Mainz, who, already deeply in debt to pay for a large accumulation of benefices, had to contribute the considerable sum of ten thousand ducats (Note: At first, "the pope demanded twelve thousand ducats for the twelve apostles. Albert offered seven thousand ducats for the seven deoadly sins. They compromised on ten thousand, presumably not for the Ten Commandments".) toward the rebuilding of the basilica. Albert obtained permission from Pope Leo X to conduct the sale of a special plenary indulgence (i.e., remission of the temporal punishment of sin), half of the proceeds of which Albrecht was to claim to pay the fees of his benefices.

On 31 October 1517, Luther wrote to his bishop, Albert, protesting against the sale of indulgences. He enclosed in his letter a copy of his "Disputation on the Power and Efficacy of Indulgences", (Note: Latin: "Disputatio pro declaratione virtutis indulgentiarum" – The first printings of the Theses use an incipit rather than a title which summarizes the content. Luther usually called them "meine Propositiones" (my propositions).) which came to be known as the Ninety-five Theses. Hans Hillerbrand writes that Luther had no intention of confronting the Church, but saw his disputation as a scholarly objection to Church practices, and the tone of the writing is accordingly "searching, rather than doctrinaire." Hillerbrand writes that there is nevertheless an undercurrent of challenge in several of the theses, particularly in Thesis 86, which asks: "Why does the pope, whose wealth today is greater than the wealth of the richest Crassus, build the basilica of St. Peter with the money of poor believers rather than with his own money?"

Luther objected to a saying attributed to Tetzel that, "As soon as the coin in the coffer rings, the soul from purgatory (also attested as 'into heaven') springs." (Note: Tetzel's "Anti-theses" were a reply to Luther's Ninety-five Theses and were drawn up by Tetzel's friend and former professor, Konrad Wimpina. Theses 55 & 56 (responding to Luther's 27th Thesis) read: "For a soul to fly out, is for it to obtain the vision of God, which can be hindered by no interruption, therefore he errs who says that the soul cannot fly out before the coin can jingle in the bottom of the chest." (Latin: "Animam purgatam evolare, est eam visione dei potiri, quod nulla potest intercapedine impediri. Quisquis ergo dicit, non citius posse animam volare, quam in fundo cistae denarius possit tinnire, errat.") See also: Herbermann, Charles, ed. (1913). "Johann Tetzel" . Catholic Encyclopedia. New York: Robert Appleton Company.) He insisted that, since forgiveness was God's alone to grant, those who claimed that indulgences absolved buyers from all punishments and granted them salvation were in error. Christians, he said, must not slacken in following Christ on account of such false assurances.

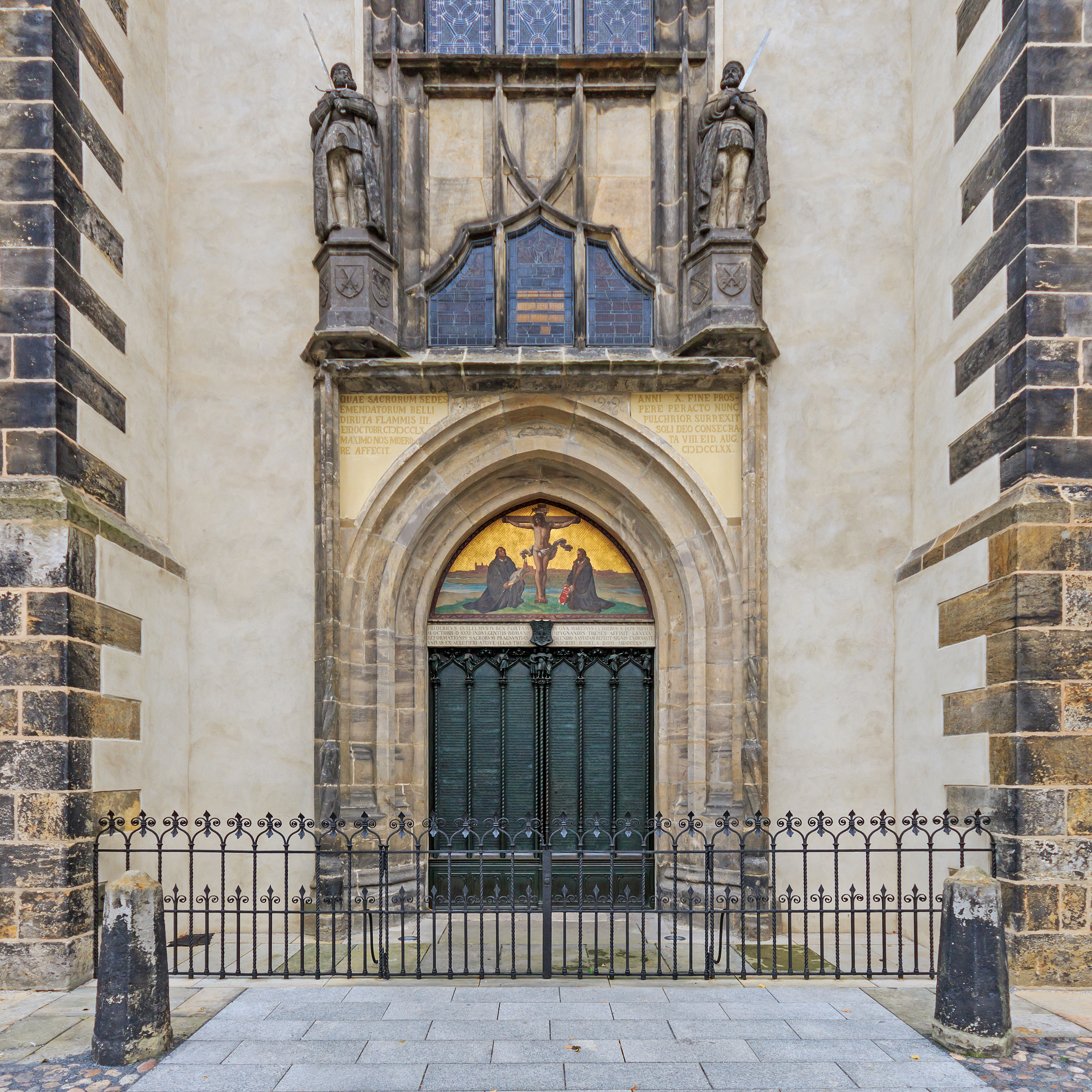
Luther's theses are engraved into the door of All Saints' Church, Wittenberg; the Latin inscription above informs the reader that the original door was destroyed by a fire, and that in 1857, King Frederick William IV of Prussia ordered that a replacement be made.

According to one account, Luther nailed his Ninety-five Theses to the door of All Saints' Church in Wittenberg on 31 October 1517. The story rests on a statement by Luther's collaborator Philip Melanchthon, who was not yet in Wittenberg at the time. The historian Roland H. Bainton accepted it as fact. In the 1960s the Catholic historian Erwin Iserloh argued that no posting took place and that Luther sent the theses only to Archbishop Albert and to Jerome Schultz, Bishop of Brandenburg. Walter Krämer, Götz Trenkler, Gerhard Ritter, and Gerhard Prause have taken similar positions. In 2006 Martin Treu found a note by Luther's secretary Georg Rörer in a 1540 New Testament at the university library in Jena. It states that on the eve of All Saints' Day 1517, theses on indulgences were posted on the doors of the Wittenberg churches. Rörer was not an eyewitness either, but he belonged to Luther's inner circle, and Treu regards the note as the earliest known reference to the posting.

The Latin Theses were printed in several locations in Germany in 1517. In January 1518 friends of Luther translated the Ninety-five Theses into German. Within two weeks, copies of the Theses had spread throughout Germany. Luther's writings circulated widely, reaching France, England, and Italy as early as 1519.

Students thronged to Wittenberg to hear Luther speak. He published a short commentary on Galatians and his Work on the Psalms. This early part of Luther's career was one of his most creative and productive. Three of his best-known works were published in 1520: To the Christian Nobility of the German Nation, On the Babylonian Captivity of the Church, and On the Freedom of a Christian.

=== Breach with the papacy ===
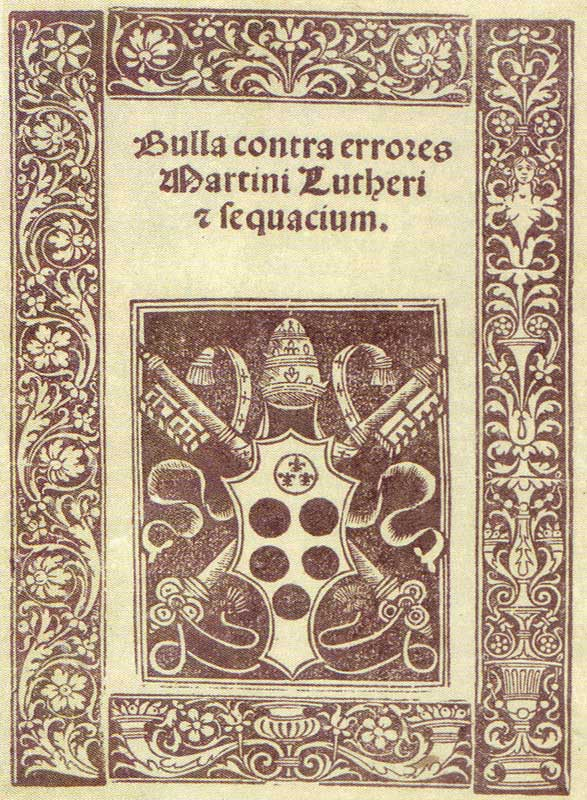
Pope Leo X's Bull against the errors of Martin Luther, 1521, commonly known as Exsurge Domine

Archbishop Albert did not reply to Luther's letter containing the Ninety-five Theses. He had the Theses checked for heresy and in December 1517 forwarded them to Rome. He needed the revenue from the indulgences to pay off a papal dispensation for his tenure of more than one bishopric. As Luther later notes, "the pope had a finger in the pie as well, because one half was to go to the building of St. Peter's Church in Rome".

The Pope was used to reformers and heretics, and he responded slowly, "with great care as is proper." Over the next three years he deployed a series of papal theologians and envoys against Luther, which served only to harden Luther's anti-papal theology. First, the Dominican theologian Sylvester Mazzolini drafted a heresy case against Luther, whom Leo then summoned to Rome. Frederick III, Elector of Saxony, persuaded the Pope to have Luther examined at Augsburg, where the Imperial Diet was held. Over a three-day period in October 1518 where he stayed at St Anne's Priory, Luther defended himself under questioning by Cardinal Cajetan, a papal legate. The Pope's right to issue indulgences was at the centre of the dispute between the two men. The hearings degenerated into a shouting match. More than writing his theses, Luther's confrontation with the Church cast him as an enemy of the Pope: "His Holiness abuses Scripture", retorted Luther. "I deny that he is above Scripture". Cajetan's original instructions had been to arrest Luther if he failed to recant, but the legate desisted from doing so. With help from the Carmelite friar Christoph Langenmantel, Luther slipped out of the city at night, unbeknownst to Cajetan.

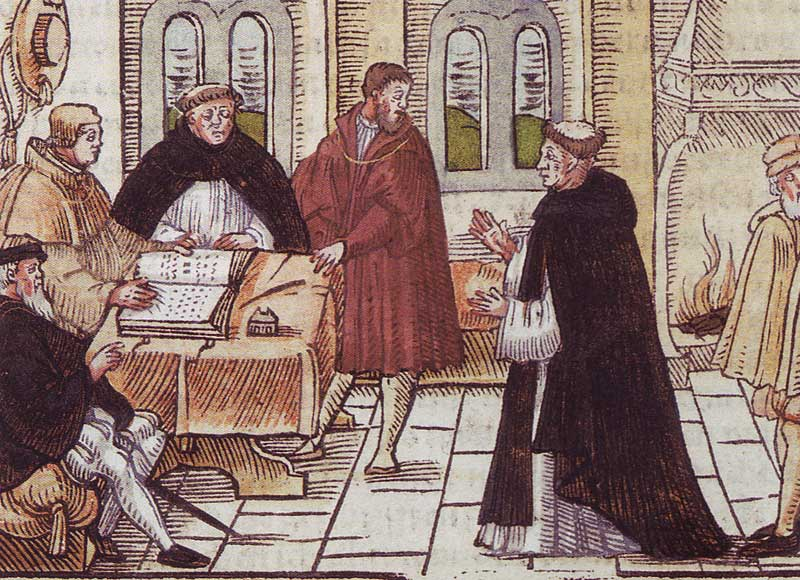
Luther (right) meeting Cardinal Cajetan (left)

In January 1519, at Altenburg in Saxony, the papal nuncio Karl von Miltitz adopted a more conciliatory approach. Luther made certain concessions to the Saxon, who was a relative of the Elector, and promised to remain silent if his opponents did. The theologian Johann Eck, however, was determined to expose Luther's doctrine in a public forum. In June and July 1519, he staged a disputation with Luther's colleague Andreas Karlstadt at Leipzig and invited Luther to speak. Luther's boldest assertion in the debate was that popes do not have the exclusive right to interpret scripture, and that therefore neither popes nor church councils were infallible. For this, Eck branded Luther a new Jan Hus, referring to the Czech reformer and heretic burned at the stake in 1415. From that moment, he devoted himself to Luther's defeat.

=== Excommunication ===
On 15 June 1520, the Pope warned Luther with the papal bull (edict) Exsurge Domine that he risked excommunication unless he recanted 41 sentences drawn from his writings, including the Ninety-five Theses, within 60 days. That autumn, Eck proclaimed the bull in Meissen and other towns. Von Miltitz attempted to broker a solution, but Luther, who had sent the Pope a copy of On the Freedom of a Christian in October, publicly set fire to the bull and decretals in Wittenberg on 10 December 1520, an act he defended in Why the Pope and his Recent Book are Burned and Assertions Concerning All Articles.

Luther was excommunicated by the Pope on 3 January 1521, in the bull Decet Romanum Pontificem. Although the Lutheran World Federation, Methodists, and the Catholic Church's Pontifical Council for Promoting Christian Unity agreed (in 1999 and 2006, respectively) on a "common understanding of justification by God's grace through faith in Christ", the Catholic Church has never lifted the 1521 excommunication.

=== Diet of Worms (1521) ===
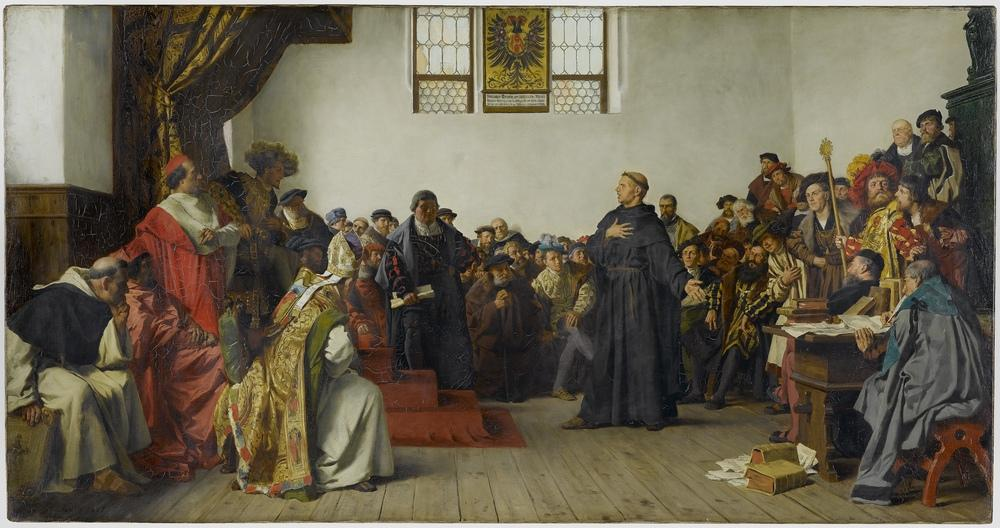
Luther Before the Diet of Worms, an 1877 portrait by Anton von Werner

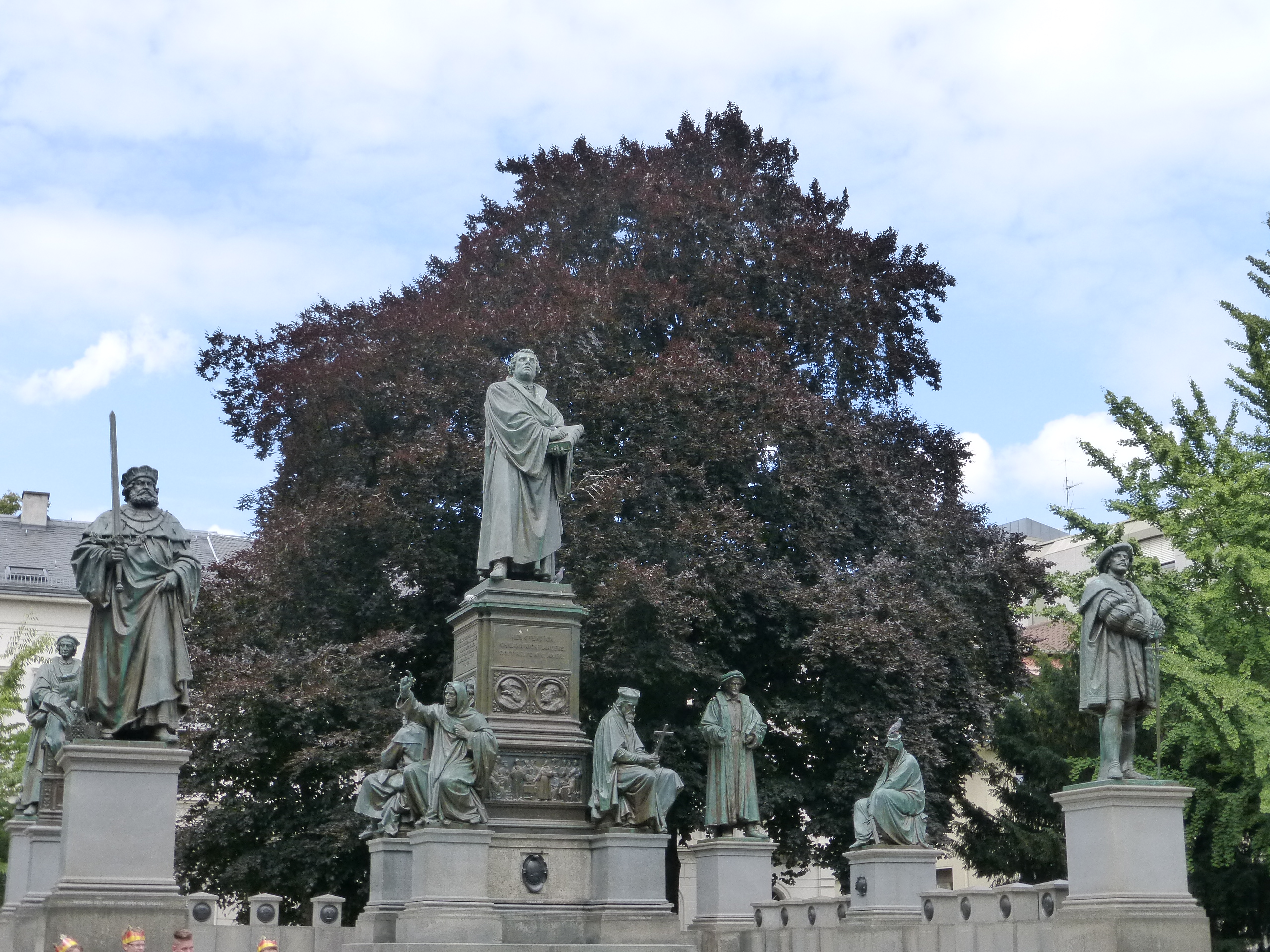
Luther Monument in Worms, a statue of Luther surrounded by the figures of his lay protectors and earlier Church reformers, including John Wycliffe, Jan Hus, and Girolamo Savonarola

The enforcement of the ban on the Ninety-five Theses fell to the secular authorities. On 17 April 1521, Luther appeared as ordered before the Diet of Worms. This was a general assembly of the estates of the Holy Roman Empire that took place in Worms, a town on the Rhine. It was conducted from 28 January to 25 May 1521, with Emperor Charles V presiding. Prince Frederick III, Elector of Saxony, obtained a safe conduct for Luther to and from the meeting.

Johann von der Ecken, speaking on behalf of the Empire as an official of Richard von Greiffenklau zu Vollrads, Archbishop of Trier, presented Luther with copies of his writings laid out on a table and asked him whether the books were his and whether he stood by their content. Luther confirmed he was their author but requested time to think about the answer to the second question. He prayed, consulted friends, and gave his response the next day:

Unless I am convinced by the testimony of the Scriptures or by clear reason (for I do not trust either in the pope or in councils alone, since it is well known that they have often erred and contradicted themselves), I am bound by the Scriptures I have quoted, and my conscience is captive to the Word of God. I cannot and will not recant anything since it is neither safe nor right to go against conscience. May God help me. Amen.

At the end of this speech, Luther raised his arm "in the traditional salute of a knight winning a bout." Michael Mullett considers this speech as a "world classic of epoch-making oratory."

Eck informed Luther that he was acting like a heretic, saying,

Martin, there is no one of the heresies which have torn the bosom of the church, which has not derived its origin from the various interpretation of the Scripture. The Bible itself is the arsenal whence each innovator has drawn his deceptive arguments. It was with Biblical texts that Pelagius and Arius maintained their doctrines. Arius, for instance, found the negation of the eternity of the Word—an eternity which you admit, in this verse of the New Testament—Joseph knew not his wife till she had brought forth her first-born son; and he said, in the same way that you say, that this passage enchained him. When the fathers of the Council of Constance condemned this proposition of Jan Hus—The church of Jesus Christ is only the community of the elect, they condemned an error; for the church, like a good mother, embraces within her arms all who bear the name of Christian, all who are called to enjoy the celestial beatitude.

Luther refused to recant his writings. He is sometimes also quoted as saying: "Here I stand. I can do no other". Recent scholars consider the evidence for these words to be unreliable since they were inserted before "May God help me" only in later versions of the speech and not recorded in witness accounts of the proceedings. However, Mullett suggests that given his nature, "we are free to believe that Luther would tend to select the more dramatic form of words."

Over the next five days, private conferences were held to determine Luther's fate. The Emperor presented the final draft of the Edict of Worms on 25 May 1521, declaring Luther an outlaw, banning his literature, and requiring his arrest: "We want him to be apprehended and punished as a notorious heretic." The edict allowed anyone to kill Luther without legal consequence, and made it a crime to give him food or shelter.

=== Wartburg Castle (1521) ===
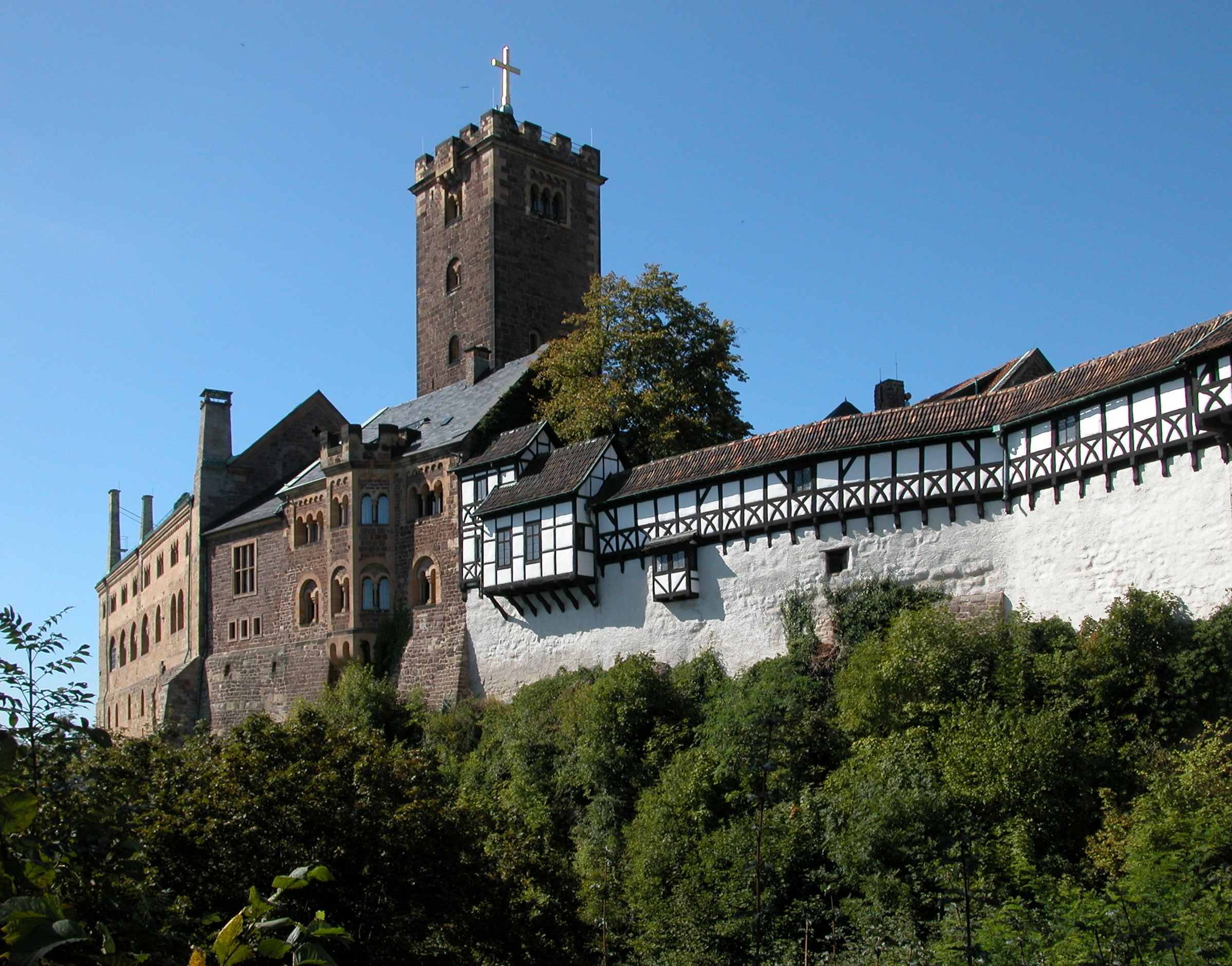
Wartburg Castle in Eisenach

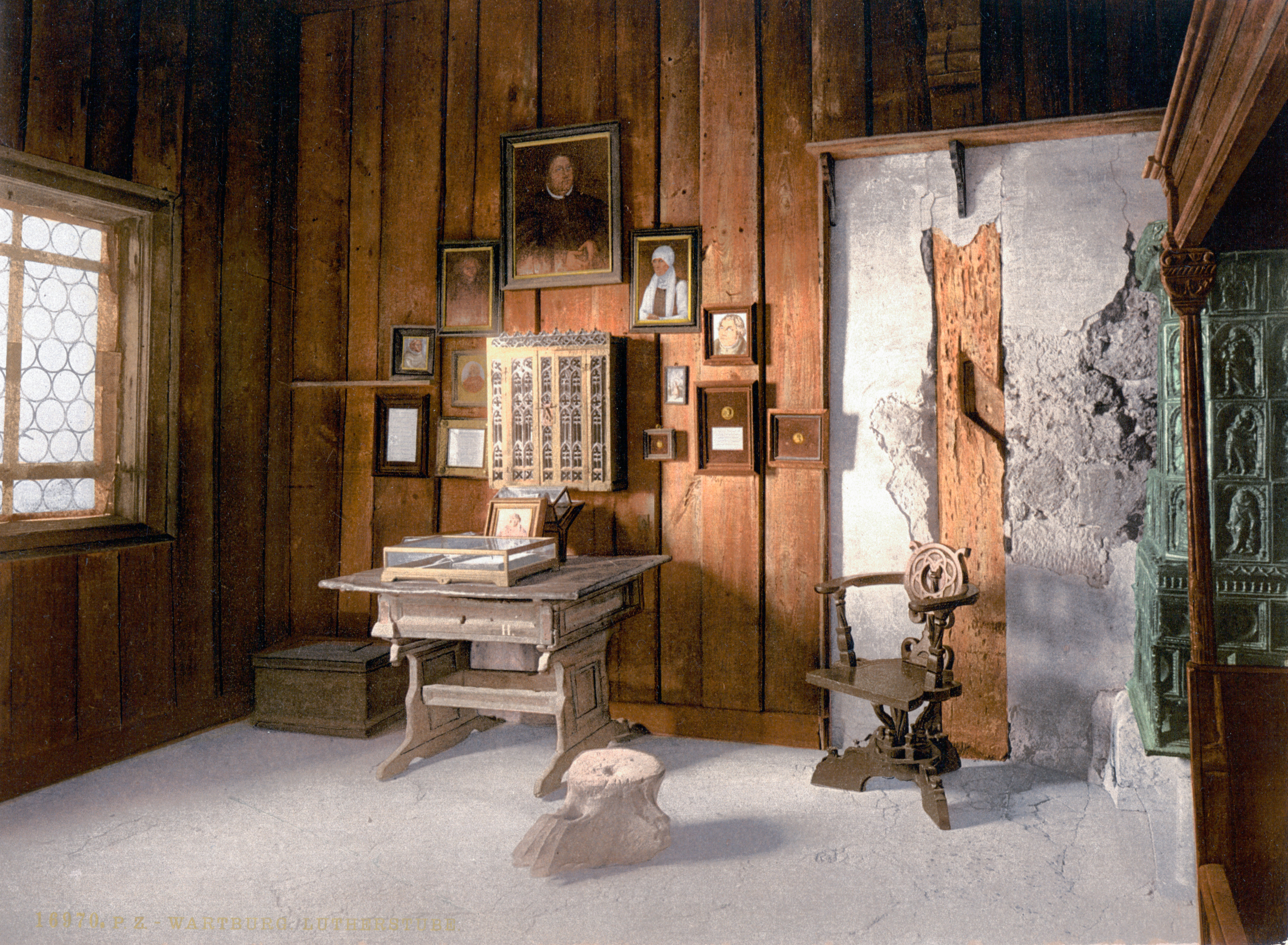
The Wartburg room where Luther translated the New Testament into German; an original first edition is kept in the case on the desk.

It is often said that Luther was "kidnapped" on his way home from the Diet of Worms to Wittenberg. But in fact Luther's disappearance was planned: it was a staged rescue secretly arranged by his protector Frederick III. Frederick had him intercepted on 4 May 1521 near Altenstein Castle in the Thuringian Forest, south of Eisenach, by masked horsemen impersonating highway robbers. They escorted Luther to the security of the Wartburg Castle at Eisenach. During his stay at Wartburg, which he referred to as "my Patmos", Luther translated the New Testament from Greek into German and produced numerous doctrinal and polemical writings. These included a renewed attack on Archbishop Albert, whom he shamed into halting the sale of indulgences in his episcopates, and a Refutation of the Argument of Latomus, in which he expounded the principle of justification to Jacobus Latomus, an orthodox theologian from Louvain. In this work, one of his most emphatic statements on faith, he argued that every good work designed to attract God's favour is a sin. All humans are sinners by nature, he explained, and God's grace alone (which cannot be earned) can make them just. On 1 August 1521, Luther wrote to Melanchthon on the same theme: "Be a sinner, and let your sins be strong, but let your trust in Christ be stronger, and rejoice in Christ who is the victor over sin, death, and the world. We will commit sins while we are here, for this life is not a place where justice resides."

In the summer of 1521, Luther widened his target from individual pieties like indulgences and pilgrimages to doctrines at the heart of Church practice. In On the Abrogation of the Private Mass, he condemned as idolatry the idea that the mass is a sacrifice, asserting instead that it is a gift, to be received with thanksgiving by the whole congregation. His essay On Confession, Whether the Pope has the Power to Require It rejected compulsory confession and encouraged private confession and absolution, since "every Christian is a confessor." In November, Luther wrote The Judgement of Martin Luther on Monastic Vows. He assured monks and nuns that they could break their vows without sin, because vows were an illegitimate and vain attempt to win salvation.

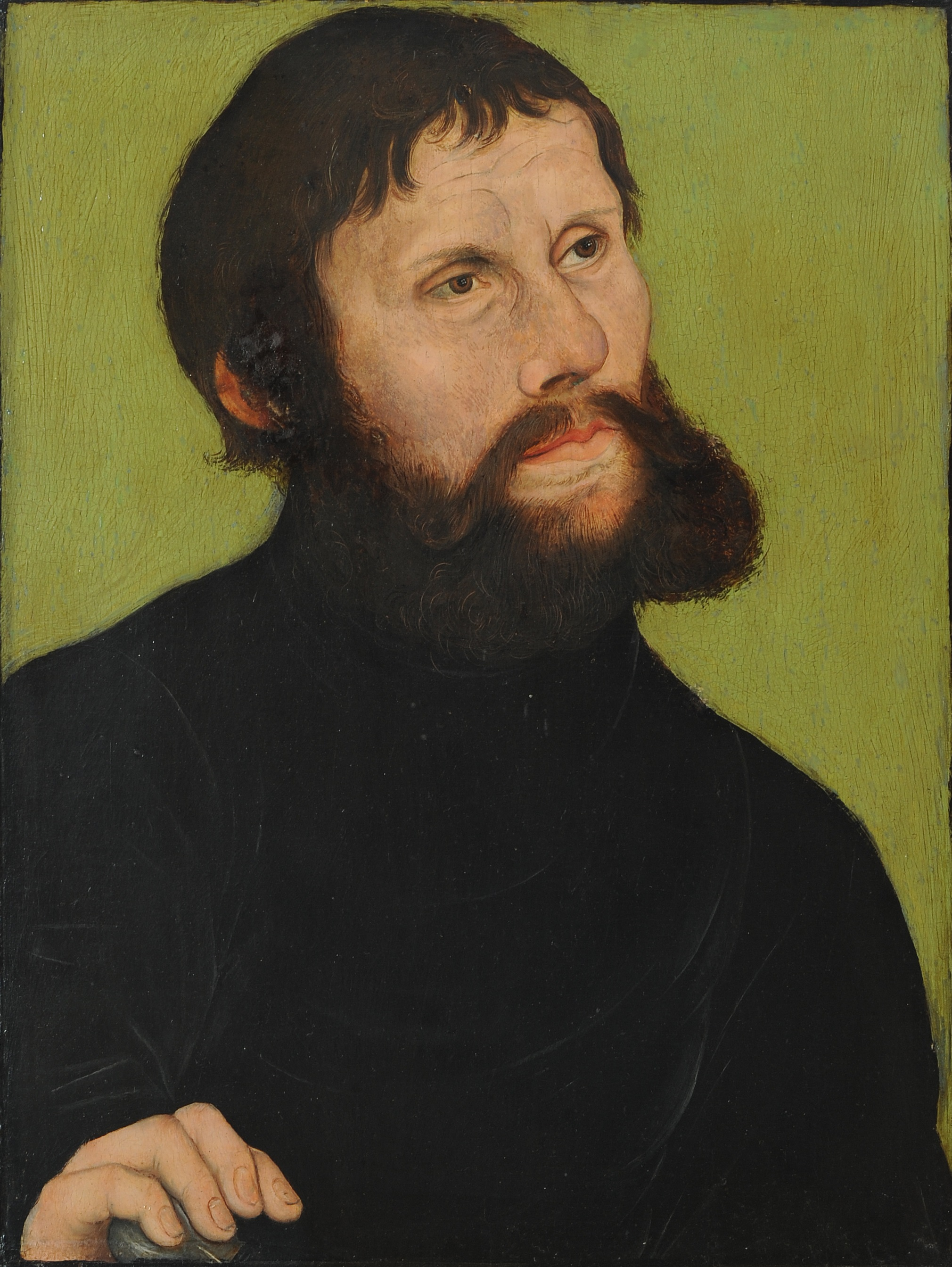
Luther disguised as "Junker Jörg" in 1521

Luther made his pronouncements from Wartburg in the context of rapid developments at Wittenberg, of which he was kept fully informed. Andreas Karlstadt, supported by the ex-Augustinian Gabriel Zwilling, embarked on a radical programme of reform there in June 1521, exceeding anything envisaged by Luther. The reforms provoked disturbances, including a revolt by the Augustinian friars against their prior, the smashing of statues and images in churches, and denunciations of the magistracy. After secretly visiting Wittenberg in early December 1521, Luther wrote A Sincere Admonition by Martin Luther to All Christians to Guard Against Insurrection and Rebellion. Wittenberg became even more volatile after Christmas when a band of visionary zealots, the so-called Zwickau prophets, arrived, preaching revolutionary doctrines such as the equality of man, adult baptism, and Christ's imminent return. When the town council asked Luther to return, he decided it was his duty to act.

=== Return to Wittenberg and Peasants' War: 1522–1525 ===
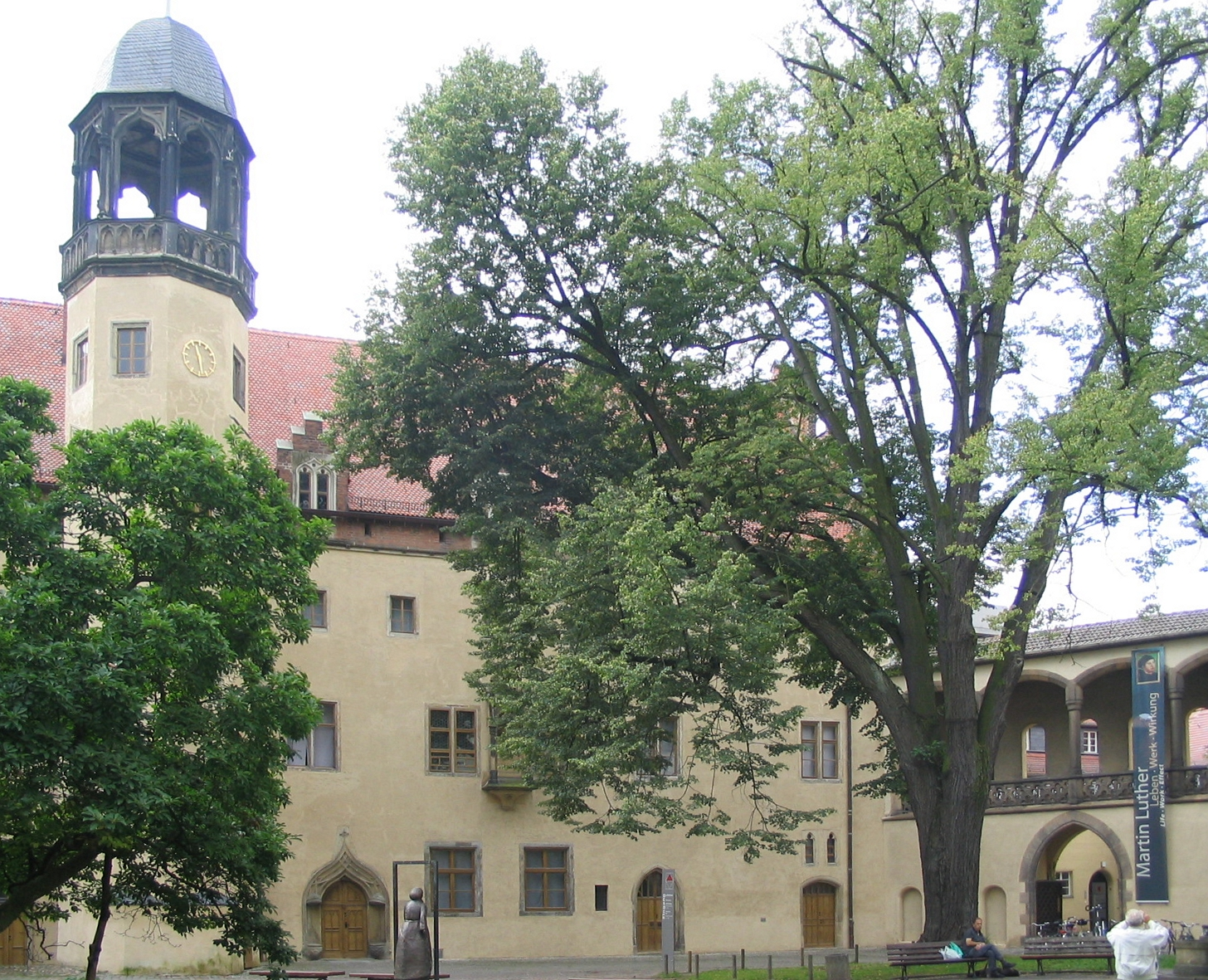
Lutherhaus, Luther's residence in Wittenberg

Luther secretly returned to Wittenberg on 6 March 1522. He wrote to the Elector: "During my absence, Satan has entered my sheepfold, and committed ravages which I cannot repair by writing, but only by my personal presence and living word." For eight days in Lent, beginning on Invocavit Sunday, 9 March, Luther preached eight sermons, which became known as the "Invocavit Sermons". In these sermons, he hammered home the primacy of core Christian values such as love, patience, charity, and freedom, and reminded the citizens to trust God's word rather than violence to bring about necessary change.

Do you know what the Devil thinks when he sees men use violence to propagate the gospel? He sits with folded arms behind the fire of hell and says with malignant looks and frightful grin: "Ah, how wise these madmen are to play my game! Let them go on; I shall reap the benefit. I delight in it." But when he sees the Word running and contending alone on the battle-field, then he shudders and shakes for fear.

The effect of Luther's intervention was immediate. After the sixth sermon, the Wittenberg jurist Jerome Schurf wrote to the elector: "Oh, what joy has Dr. Martin's return spread among us! His words, through divine mercy, are bringing back every day misguided people into the way of the truth."

Luther next set about reversing or modifying the new church practices. By working alongside the authorities to restore public order, he signalled his reinvention as a conservative force within the Reformation. After banishing the Zwickau prophets, he faced a battle against both the established Church and the radical reformers who threatened the new order by fomenting social unrest and violence.

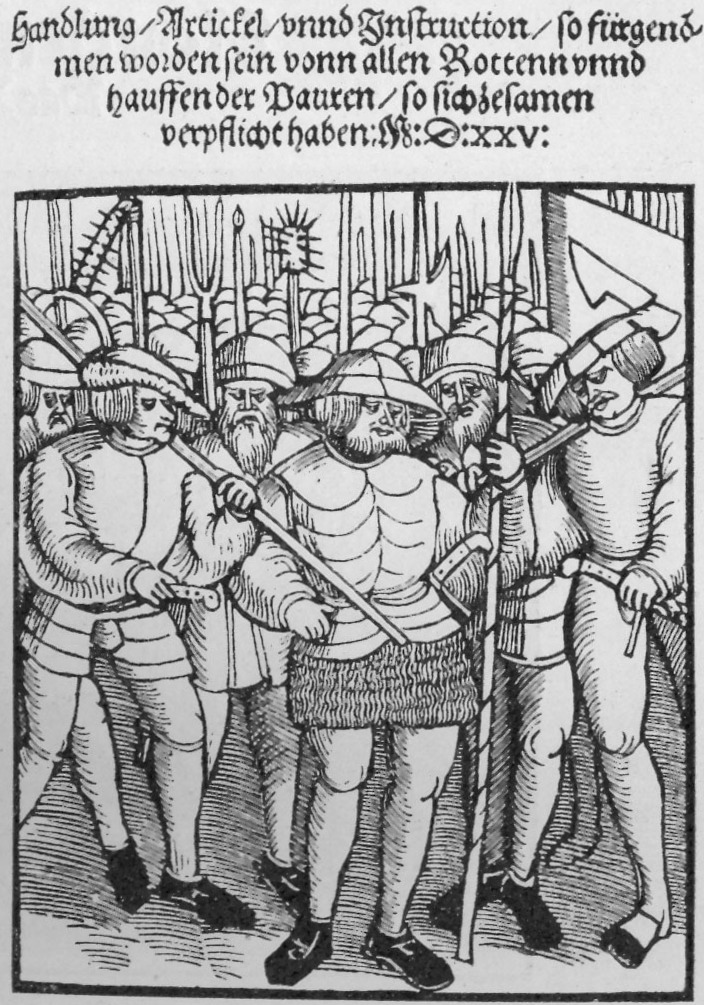
The Twelve Articles of peasants' demands, issued in 1525

Despite his victory in Wittenberg, Luther was unable to stifle radicalism further afield. Preachers such as Thomas Müntzer and the Zwickau prophet Nicholas Storch found support amongst poorer townspeople and peasants between 1521 and 1525. There had been revolts by the peasantry on smaller scales since the 15th century. Luther's pamphlets against the Church and the hierarchy, often worded with "liberal" phraseology, led many peasants to believe he would support an attack on the upper classes in general. Revolts broke out in Franconia, Swabia, and Thuringia in 1524, even drawing support from disaffected nobles, many of whom were in debt. Gaining momentum under the leadership of radicals such as Müntzer in Thuringia, and Hipler and Lotzer in the south-west, the revolts turned into war.

Luther opposed sacerdotalism—the belief that a priesthood was needed as an intermediary between God and individuals or humanity; he considered all baptised Christians to be a holy priesthood.

Luther sympathised with some of the peasants' grievances, as he showed in his response to the Twelve Articles in May 1525, but he reminded the aggrieved to obey the temporal authorities. During a tour of Thuringia, he became enraged at the widespread burning of convents, monasteries, bishops' palaces, and libraries. In Against the Murderous, Thieving Hordes of Peasants, written on his return to Wittenberg, he gave his interpretation of the Gospel teaching on wealth, condemned the violence as the devil's work, and called for the nobles to put down the rebels like mad dogs:

Therefore let everyone who can, smite, slay, and stab, secretly or openly, remembering that nothing can be more poisonous, hurtful, or devilish than a rebel ... For baptism does not make men free in body and property, but in soul; and the gospel does not make goods common, except in the case of those who, of their own free will, do what the apostles and disciples did in Acts 4 [:32–37]. They did not demand, as do our insane peasants in their raging, that the goods of others—of Pilate and Herod—should be common, but only their own goods. Our peasants, however, want to make the goods of other men common, and keep their own for themselves. Fine Christians they are! I think there is not a devil left in hell; they have all gone into the peasants. Their raving has gone beyond all measure.

Without Luther's backing for the uprising, many rebels laid down their weapons; others felt betrayed. Their defeat by the forces of Philip of Hesse and Duke George of Saxony at the Battle of Frankenhausen on 15 May 1525, followed by Müntzer's execution, brought the revolutionary stage of the Reformation to a close. Thereafter, radicalism found a refuge in the Anabaptist movement and other religious movements, while Luther's Reformation flourished under the wing of the secular powers. In 1526 Luther wrote: "I, Martin Luther, have during the rebellion slain all the peasants, for it was I who ordered them to be struck dead."

=== Marriage ===
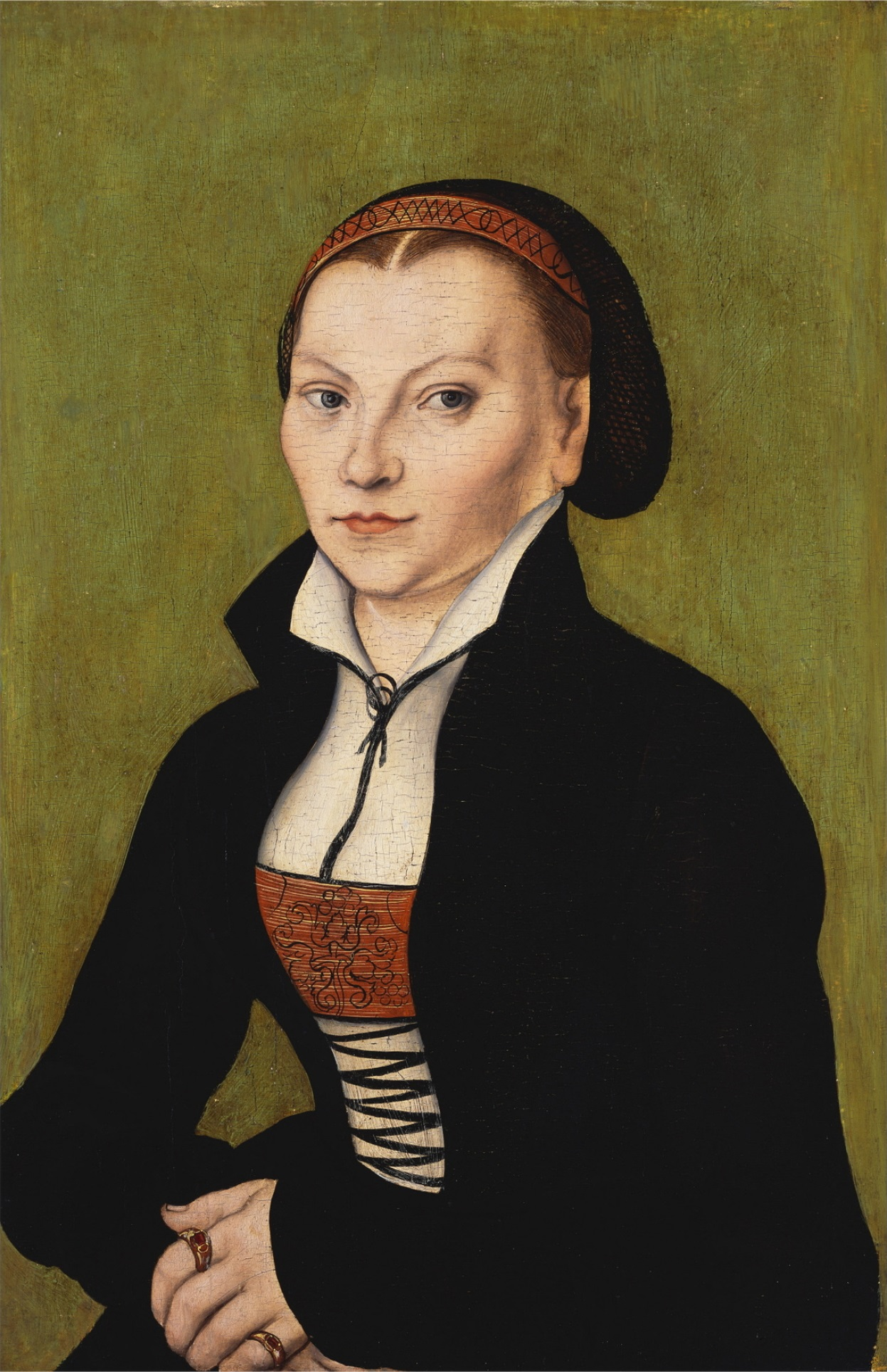
A 1526 portrait of Katharina von Bora, Luther's wife, by Lucas Cranach the Elder

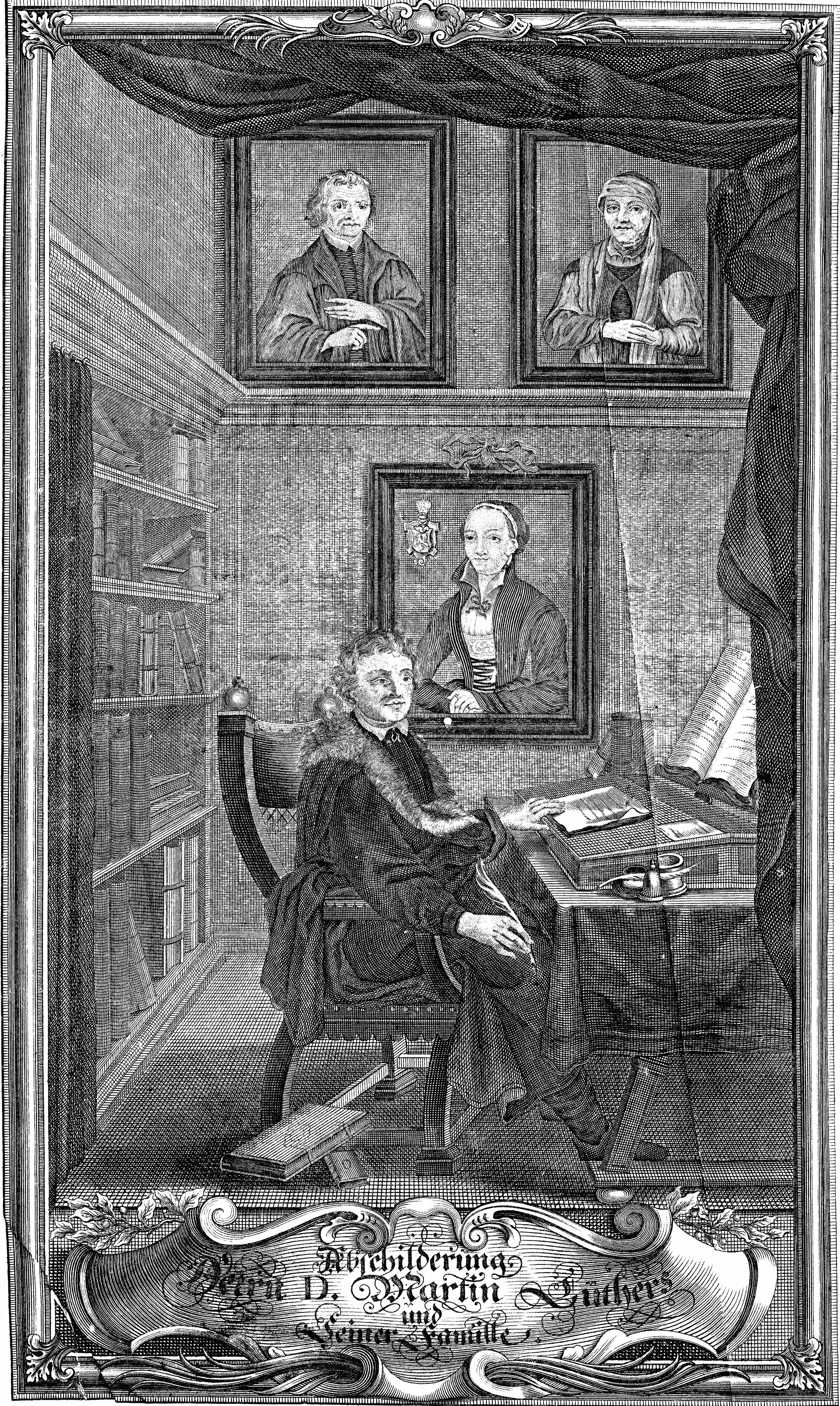
Luther at his desk with family portraits

Luther married Katharina von Bora, one of 12 nuns he had helped escape from the Nimbschen Cistercian convent in April 1523, when he arranged for them to be smuggled out in herring barrels. "Suddenly, and while I was occupied with far different thoughts", he wrote to Wenceslaus Link, "the Lord has plunged me into marriage." At the time of their marriage, Katharina was 26 years old and Luther was 41 years old.

On 13 June 1525, the couple was engaged, with Johannes Bugenhagen, Justus Jonas, Johannes Apel, Philipp Melanchthon and Lucas Cranach the Elder and his wife as witnesses. On the evening of the same day, the couple was married by Bugenhagen. The ceremonial walk to the church and the wedding banquet were left out and were made up two weeks later on 27 June.

Some priests and former members of religious orders had already married, including Andreas Karlstadt and Justus Jonas, but Luther's wedding set the seal of approval on clerical marriage. He had long condemned vows of celibacy on biblical grounds, but his decision to marry surprised many, not least Melanchthon, who called it reckless. Luther had written to George Spalatin on 30 November 1524, "I shall never take a wife, as I feel at present. Not that I am insensible to my flesh or sex (for I am neither wood nor stone); but my mind is averse to wedlock because I daily expect the death of a heretic." Before marrying, Luther had been living on the plainest food, and, as he admitted himself, his mildewed bed was not properly made for months at a time.

Luther and his wife moved into a former monastery, "The Black Cloister", a wedding present from Elector John the Steadfast. They embarked on what appears to have been a happy and successful marriage, though money was often short. Katharina bore six children: Hans – June 1526; Elisabeth – 10 December 1527, who died within a few months; Magdalene – 1529, who died in Luther's arms in 1542; Martin – 1531; Paul – January 1533; and Margaret – 1534; and she helped the couple earn a living by farming, accepting honorariums, and taking in boarders. Luther confided to Michael Stiefel on 11 August 1526: "My Katie is in all things so obliging and pleasing to me that I would not exchange my poverty for the riches of Croesus."

=== Organising the church: 1525–1529 ===
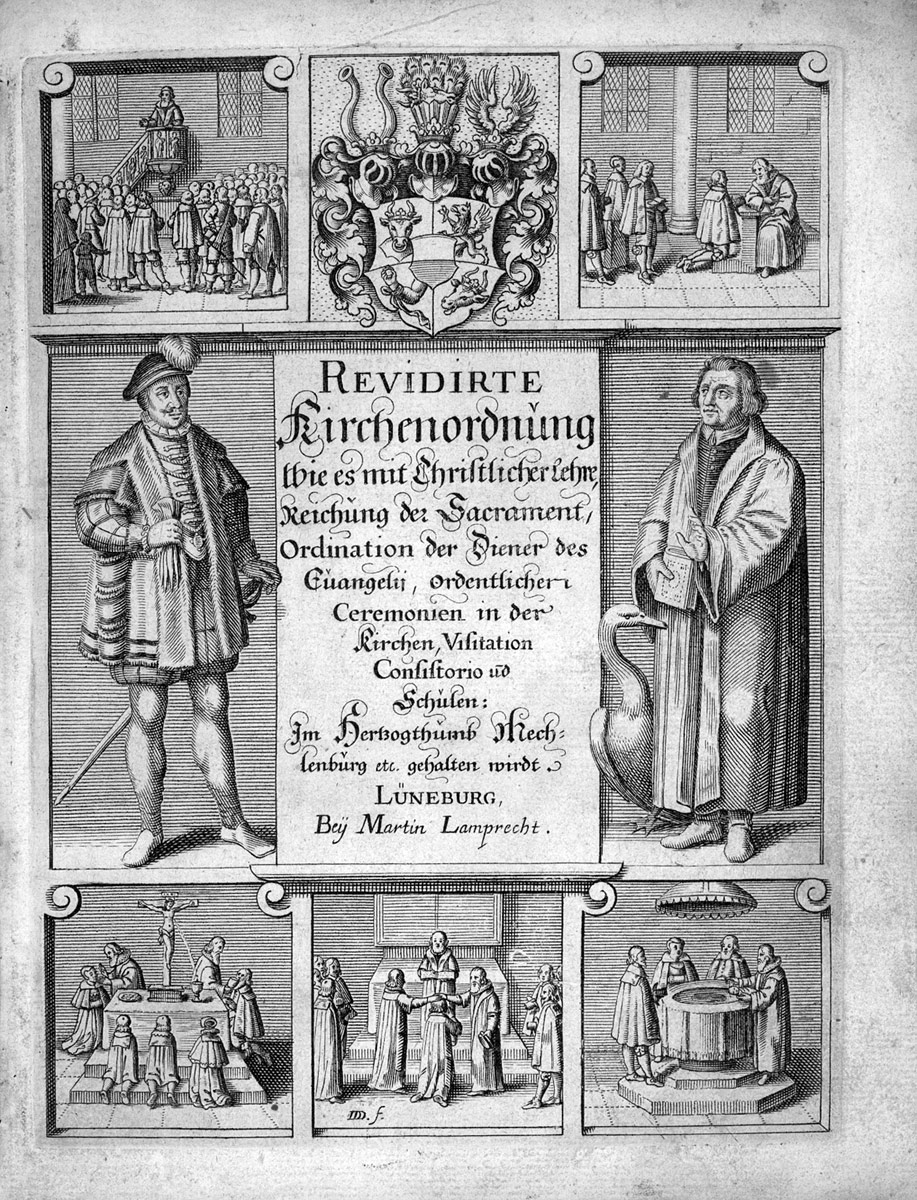
Church orders, Mecklenburg 1650

By 1526, Luther found himself increasingly occupied in organising a new church. His biblical ideal of congregations choosing their own ministers had proved unworkable. According to Bainton: "Luther's dilemma was that he wanted both a confessional church based on personal faith and experience and a territorial church including all in a given locality. If he were forced to choose, he would take his stand with the masses, and this was the direction in which he moved."

From 1525 to 1529, he established a supervisory church body, laid down a new form of worship service, and wrote a clear summary of the new faith in the form of two catechisms. To avoid confusing or upsetting the people, Luther avoided extreme change. He also did not wish to replace one controlling system with another. He concentrated on the church in the Electorate of Saxony, acting only as an adviser to churches in new territories, many of which followed his Saxon model. He worked closely with the new elector, John the Steadfast, to whom he turned for secular leadership and funds on behalf of a church largely shorn of its assets and income after the break with Rome. For Luther's biographer Martin Brecht, this partnership "was the beginning of a questionable and originally unintended development towards a church government under the temporal sovereign".

The elector authorised a visitation of the church, a power formerly exercised by bishops. At times, Luther's practical reforms fell short of his earlier radical pronouncements. For example, the Instructions for the Visitors of Parish Pastors in Electoral Saxony (1528), drafted by Melanchthon with Luther's approval, stressed the role of repentance in the forgiveness of sins, despite Luther's position that faith alone ensures justification. The Eisleben reformer Johannes Agricola challenged this compromise, and Luther condemned him for teaching that faith is separate from works. The Instruction is a problematic document for those seeking a consistent evolution in Luther's thought and practice.

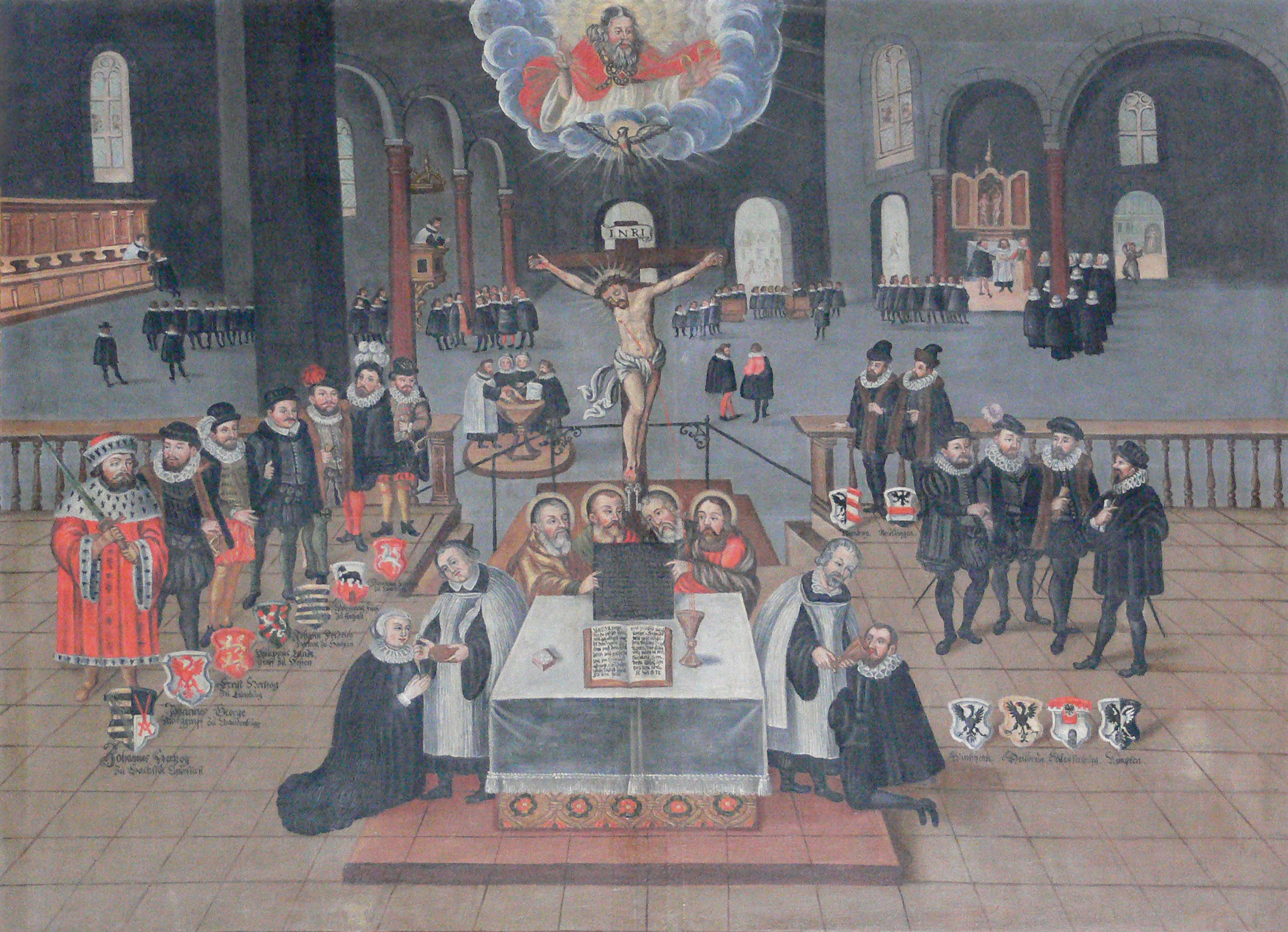
Lutheran church liturgy and sacraments

In response to demands for a German liturgy, Luther wrote a German Mass, which he published in early 1526. He did not intend it as a replacement for his 1523 adaptation of the Latin Mass but as an alternative for the "simple people", a "public stimulation for people to believe and become Christians." Luther based his order on the Catholic service but omitted language related to a propitiatory sacrifice, and the Mass became a celebration where everyone received the wine as well as the bread (cf. communion under both kinds). He retained the elevation of the host and chalice, while trappings such as the Mass vestments, altar, and candles were made optional, allowing freedom of ceremony. Some reformers, including followers of Huldrych Zwingli, considered Luther's service too papistic, and modern scholars note the conservatism of his alternative to the Catholic Mass. Luther's service, however, included congregational singing of hymns and psalms in German, as well as parts of the liturgy, including Luther's unison setting of the Creed. To reach the simple people and the young, Luther incorporated religious instruction into the weekday services in the form of catechism. He also provided simplified versions of the baptism and marriage services. The former included the "flood prayer".

Luther and his colleagues introduced the new order of worship during their visitation of the Electorate of Saxony, which began in 1527. They also assessed the standard of pastoral care and Christian education in the territory. "Merciful God, what misery I have seen", Luther writes, "the common people knowing nothing at all of Christian doctrine ... and unfortunately many pastors are well-nigh unskilled and incapable of teaching."

=== Catechisms ===
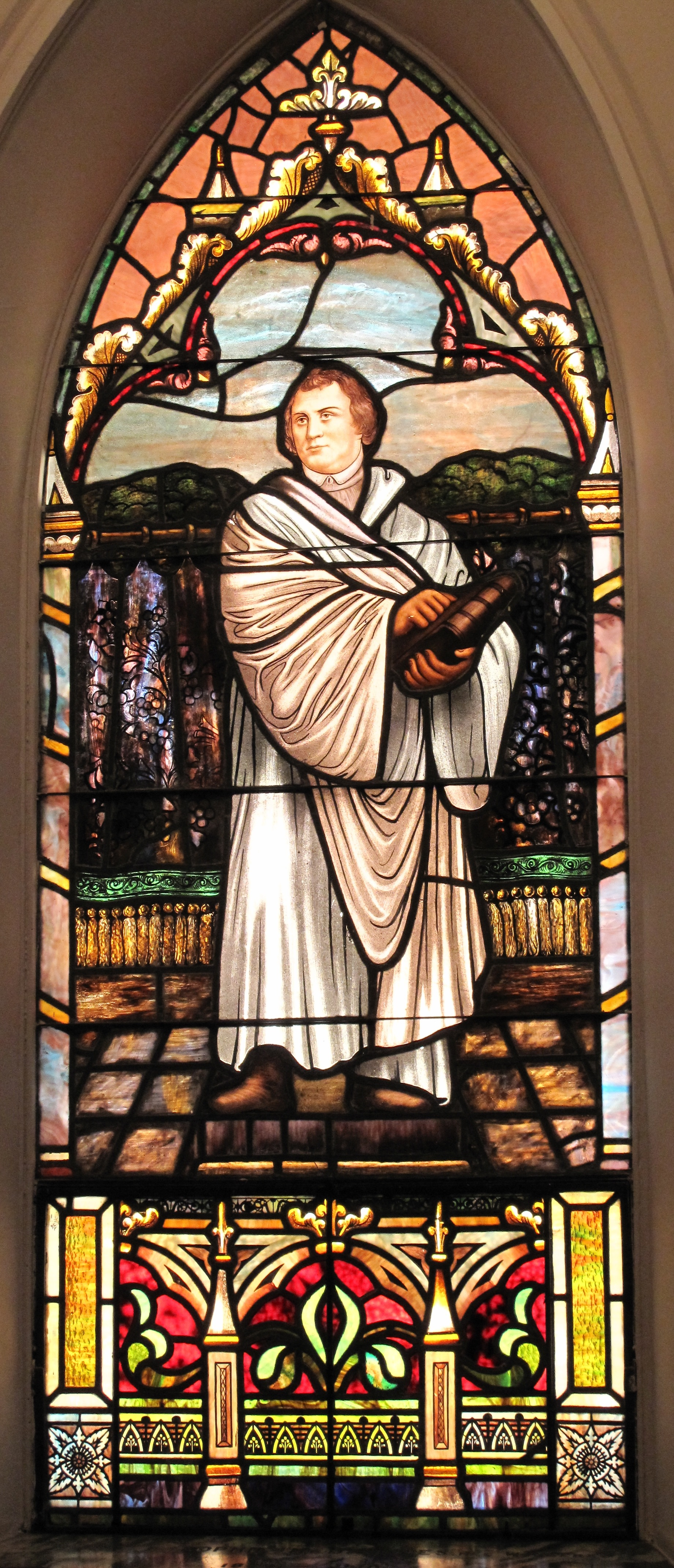
A stained glass portrayal of Luther

Luther devised the catechism as a method of imparting the basics of Christianity to the congregations. In 1529, he wrote the Large Catechism, a manual for pastors and teachers, as well as a synopsis, the Small Catechism, to be memorised by the people. The catechisms provided easy-to-understand instructional and devotional material on the Ten Commandments, the Apostles' Creed, The Lord's Prayer, baptism, and the Lord's Supper. Luther incorporated questions and answers in the catechism so that the basics of Christian faith would not just be learned by rote, "the way monkeys do it", but understood.

The catechism is one of Luther's most personal works. "Regarding the plan to collect my writings in volumes", he wrote, "I am quite cool and not at all eager about it because, roused by a Saturnian hunger, I would rather see them all devoured. For I acknowledge none of them to be really a book of mine, except perhaps the Bondage of the Will and the Catechism." The Small Catechism has earned a reputation as a model of clear religious teaching. It remains in use today, along with Luther's hymns and his translation of the Bible.

Luther's Small Catechism proved especially effective in helping parents teach their children; likewise the Large Catechism was effective for pastors. Using the German vernacular, they expressed the Apostles' Creed in simpler, more personal, Trinitarian language. He rewrote each article of the Creed to express the character of the Father, the Son, or the Holy Spirit. Luther's goal was to enable the catechumens to see themselves as a personal object of the work of the three persons of the Trinity, each of which works in the catechumen's life. That is, Luther depicts the Trinity not as a doctrine to be learned, but as persons to be known. Luther's treatment of the Apostles' Creed must be understood in the context of the Decalogue (the Ten Commandments) and The Lord's Prayer, which are also part of the Lutheran catechetical teaching.

=== Diet of Augsburg and Veste Coburg 1530 ===
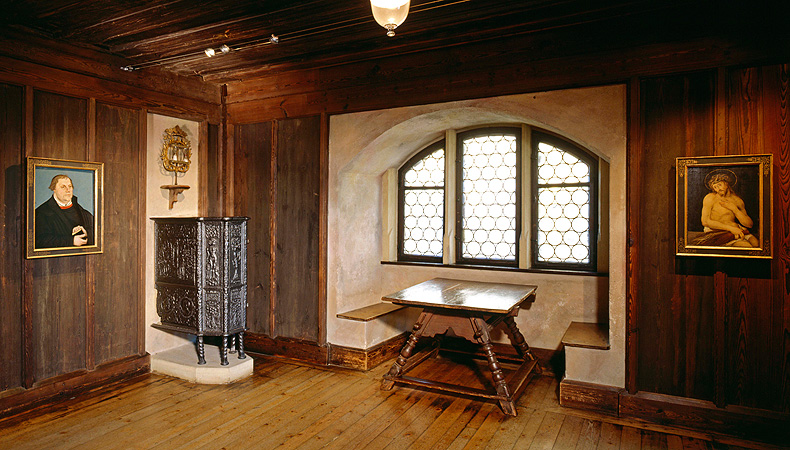
Martin Luther's room at Veste Coburg

Charles V requested the 1530 Imperial Diet to decide on three issues; one of them being the disagreements about Christianity. Since Luther was outlawed and could not personally attend, he stayed at John the Steadfast's fortress Veste Coburg from 24 April to 4 October 1530 for protection. From here he influenced Philipp Melanchthon's negotiations, including the Augsburg Confession, which was presented to Charles V on 25 June. Luther also translated portions of The Psalms and penned over a dozen works.

=== Translation of the Old Testament: 1534–1535 ===
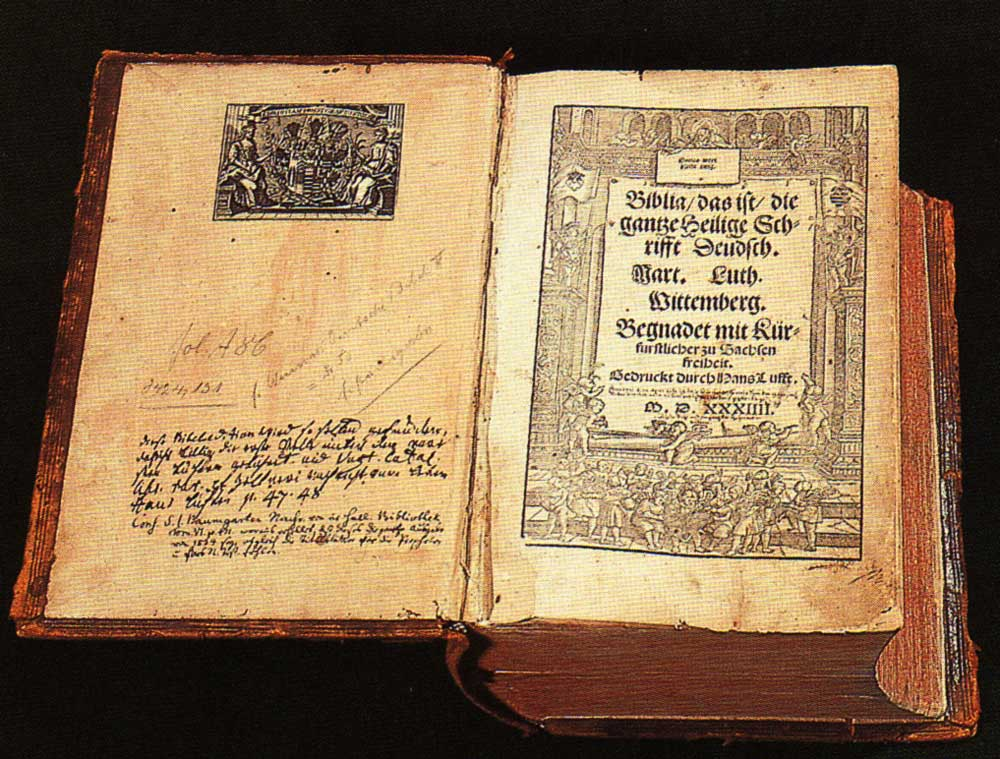
Luther's 1534 Bible

Luther had published his German translation of the New Testament in 1522, and he and his collaborators completed the translation of the Old Testament in 1534, when the whole Bible was published. He continued to work on refining the translation until the end of his life. Others had previously translated the Bible into German, but Luther tailored his translation to his own doctrine. Two of the earlier translations were the Mentelin Bible (1456) and the Koberger Bible (1484). There were as many as fourteen in High German, four in Low German, four in Dutch, and various other translations in other languages before the Bible of Luther.

Luther's translation used the variant of German spoken at the Saxon chancellery, intelligible to both northern and southern Germans. He intended his vigorous, direct language to make the Bible accessible to everyday Germans, "for we are removing impediments and difficulties so that other people may read it without hindrance." Published at a time of rising demand for German-language publications, Luther's version quickly became a popular and influential Bible translation. As such, it contributed a distinct flavor to the German language and literature. Furnished with notes and prefaces by Luther, and with woodcuts by Lucas Cranach that contained anti-papal imagery, it played a major role in the spread of Luther's doctrine throughout Germany. The Luther Bible influenced other vernacular translations, such as the Tyndale Bible, a precursor of the King James Bible.

Luther did not include the Johannine Comma (1 John 5:7) in his translation, rejecting it as a forgery. It was inserted into the text by others after Luther's death.

=== Hymnodist ===
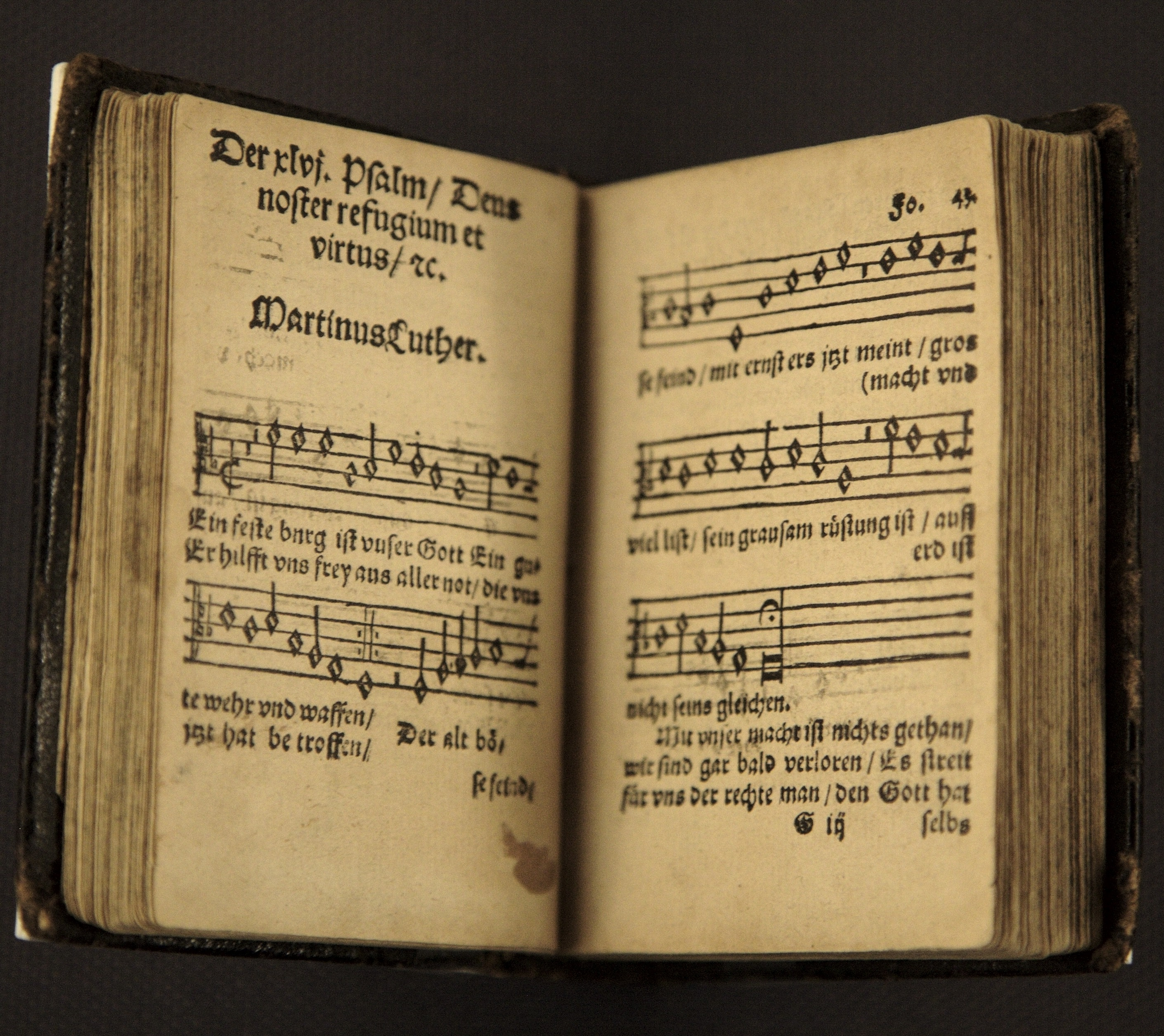
An early printing of Luther's hymn "Ein feste Burg ist unser Gott"

Ein feste Burg sung in German
The German text of "Ein feste Burg" ("A Mighty Fortress") sung to the isometric, more widely known arrangement of its traditional melody

Luther was a prolific hymnodist, authoring hymns such as "Ein feste Burg ist unser Gott" ("A Mighty Fortress Is Our God") and "Vom Himmel hoch, da komm ich her" ("From Heaven Above to Earth I Come"). Luther connected high art and folk music, also all classes, clergy and laity, men, women and children. His tool of choice for this connection was the singing of German hymns in connection with worship, school, home, and the public arena. He often accompanied the sung hymns with a lute, later recreated as the waldzither that became a national instrument of Germany in the 20th century.

Luther's hymns were frequently evoked by particular events in his life and the unfolding Reformation. This behaviour started with his learning of the execution of Jan van Essen and Hendrik Vos, the first persons to be martyred by the Roman Catholic Church for Lutheran views, prompting Luther to write the hymn "Ein neues Lied wir heben an" ("A New Song We Raise"), which is generally known in English by John C. Messenger's translation by the title and first line "Flung to the Heedless Winds" and sung to the tune Ibstone composed in 1875 by Maria C. Tiddeman.

Luther's 1524 creedal hymn "Wir glauben all an einen Gott" ("We All Believe in One True God") is a three-stanza confession of faith prefiguring Luther's 1529 three-part explanation of the Apostles' Creed in the Small Catechism. Luther's hymn, adapted and expanded from an earlier German creedal hymn, gained widespread use in vernacular Lutheran liturgies as early as 1525. Sixteenth-century Lutheran hymnals also included "Wir glauben all" among the catechetical hymns, although 18th-century hymnals tended to label the hymn as Trinitarian rather than catechetical, and 20th-century Lutherans rarely used the hymn because of the perceived difficulty of its tune.

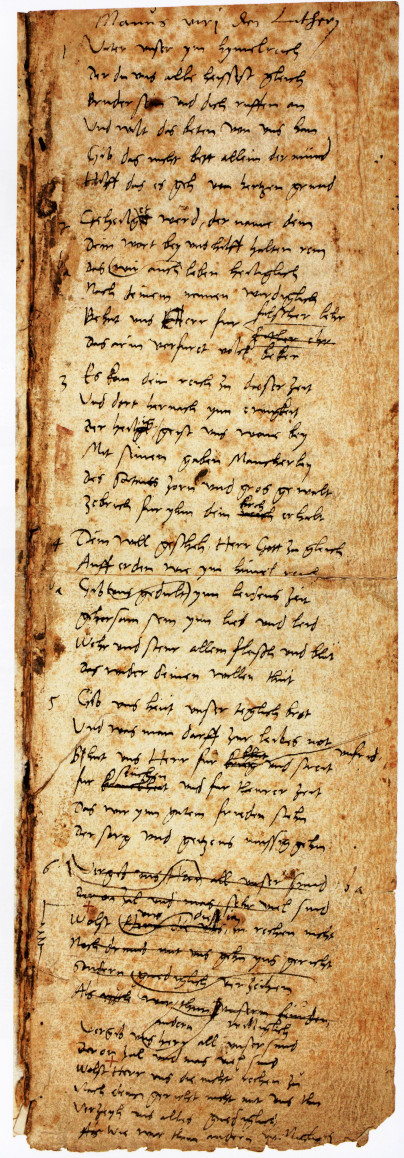
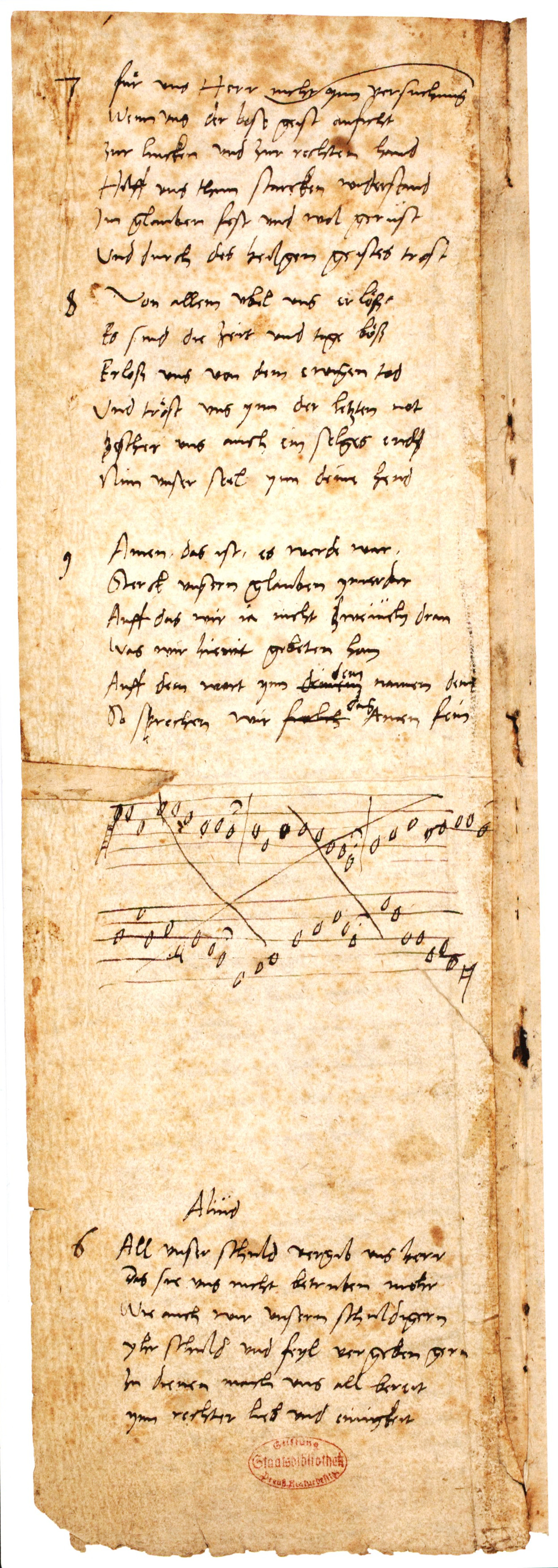
Autograph of "Vater unser im Himmelreich", with the only notes extant in Luther's handwriting

Luther's 1538 hymnic version of the Lord's Prayer, "Vater unser im Himmelreich", corresponds exactly to Luther's explanation of the prayer in the Small Catechism. The hymn functions both as a liturgical setting of the Lord's Prayer and as a means of examining candidates on specific catechism questions. The extant manuscript shows multiple revisions, demonstrating Luther's concern to clarify and strengthen the text and to provide an appropriately prayerful tune. Other 16th- and 20th-century versifications of the Lord's Prayer have adopted Luther's tune, although modern texts are considerably shorter.

Luther wrote "Aus tiefer Not schrei ich zu dir" ("From depths of woe I cry to You") in 1523 as a hymnic version of Psalm 130 and sent it as a sample to encourage his colleagues to write psalm-hymns for use in German worship. In a collaboration with Paul Speratus, this and seven other hymns were published in the Achtliederbuch, the first Lutheran hymnal. In 1524 Luther developed his original four-stanza psalm paraphrase into a five-stanza Reformation hymn that developed the theme of "grace alone" more fully. Because it expressed essential Reformation doctrine, this expanded version of "Aus tiefer Not" was designated as a regular component of several regional Lutheran liturgies and was widely used at funerals, including Luther's own. Along with Erhart Hegenwalt's hymnic version of Psalm 51, Luther's expanded hymn was also adopted for use with the fifth part of Luther's catechism, concerning confession.

Luther wrote "Ach Gott, vom Himmel sieh darein" ("Oh God, Look Down from Heaven"). "Nun komm, der Heiden Heiland" (Now Come, Savior of the Gentiles), based on Veni redemptor gentium, became the main hymn (German: hauptlied) for Advent. He transformed A solus ortus cardine to "Christum wir sollen loben schon" ("We should now praise Christ") and Veni Creator Spiritus to "Komm, Gott Schöpfer, Heiliger Geist" ("Come, Holy Spirit, Lord God"). He wrote two hymns on the Ten Commandments, "Dies sind die heilgen Zehn Gebot" and "Mensch, willst du leben seliglich". His "Gelobet seist du, Jesu Christ" ("Praise be to You, Jesus Christ") became the main hymn for Christmas. He wrote for Pentecost "Nun bitten wir den Heiligen Geist", and adopted for Easter "Christ ist erstanden" (Christ is Risen), based on Victimae paschali laudes. "Mit Fried und Freud ich fahr dahin", a paraphrase of Nunc dimittis, was intended for Purification, but became also a funeral hymn. He paraphrased the Te Deum as "Herr Gott, dich loben wir" with a simplified form of the melody. It became known as the German Te Deum.

Luther's 1541 hymn "Christ unser Herr zum Jordan kam" ("To Jordan came the Christ our Lord") reflects the structure and substance of his questions and answers concerning baptism in the Small Catechism. Luther adopted a preexisting Johann Walter tune associated with a hymnic setting of Psalm 67's prayer for grace; Wolf Heintz's four-part setting of the hymn was used to introduce the Lutheran Reformation in Halle in 1541. Preachers and composers of the 18th century, including J.S. Bach, used this rich hymn as a subject for their own work, although its objective baptismal theology was displaced by more subjective hymns under the influence of late-19th-century Lutheran pietism.

Luther's hymns were included in early Lutheran hymnals and spread the ideas of the Reformation. He supplied four of eight songs of the First Lutheran hymnal Achtliederbuch, 18 of 26 songs of the Erfurt Enchiridion, and 24 of the 32 songs in the first choral hymnal with settings by Johann Walter, Eyn geystlich Gesangk Buchleyn, all published in 1524. Luther's hymns inspired composers to write music. Johann Sebastian Bach included several verses as chorales in his cantatas and based chorale cantatas entirely on them, namely Christ lag in Todes Banden, BWV 4, as early as possibly 1707, in his second annual cycle (1724 to 1725) Ach Gott, vom Himmel sieh darein, BWV 2, Christ unser Herr zum Jordan kam, BWV 7, Nun komm, der Heiden Heiland, BWV 62, Gelobet seist du, Jesu Christ, BWV 91, and Aus tiefer Not schrei ich zu dir, BWV 38, later Ein feste Burg ist unser Gott, BWV 80, and in 1735 Wär Gott nicht mit uns diese Zeit, BWV 14.

=== On the soul after death ===
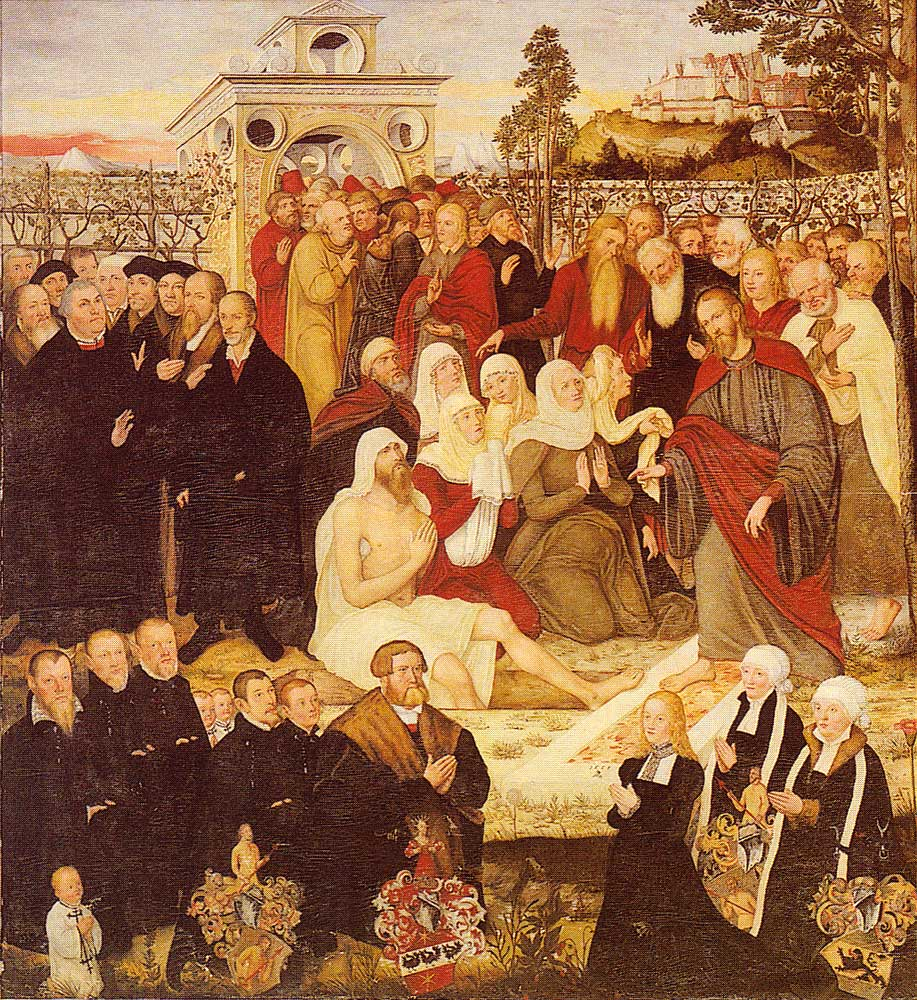
Luther on the left with Lazarus being raised by Jesus from the dead, painting by Lucas Cranach the Younger, 1558

In contrast to the views of John Calvin and Philipp Melanchthon, throughout his life Luther maintained that it was not false doctrine to believe that a Christian's soul sleeps after it is separated from the body in death. Accordingly, he disputed traditional interpretations of some Bible passages, such as the parable of the rich man and Lazarus. This also led Luther to reject the idea of torments for the saints: "It is enough for us to know that souls do not leave their bodies to be threatened by the torments and punishments of hell, but enter a prepared bedchamber in which they sleep in peace." He also rejected the existence of purgatory, which involved Christian souls undergoing penitential suffering after death. He affirmed the continuity of one's personal identity beyond death. In his Smalcald Articles, he described the saints as currently residing "in their graves and in heaven."

The Lutheran theologian Franz Pieper observes that Luther's teaching about the state of the Christian's soul after death differed from the later Lutheran theologians such as Johann Gerhard. Lessing (1755) had earlier reached the same conclusion in his analysis of Lutheran orthodoxy on this issue.

Luther's Commentary on Genesis contains a passage which concludes that "the soul does not sleep (anima non sic dormit), but wakes (sed vigilat) and experiences visions". Francis Blackburne argues that John Jortin misread this and other passages from Luther, while Gottfried Fritschel points out that it actually refers to the soul of a man "in this life" (homo enim in hac vita) tired from his daily labour (defatigus diurno labore) who at night enters his bedchamber (sub noctem intrat in cubiculum suum) and whose sleep is interrupted by dreams.

Henry Eyster Jacobs' English translation from 1898 reads:

"Nevertheless, the sleep of this life and that of the future life differ; for in this life, man, fatigued by his daily labour, at nightfall goes to his couch, as in peace, to sleep there, and enjoys rest; nor does he know anything of evil, whether of fire or of murder."

=== Sacramentarian controversy and the Marburg Colloquy ===
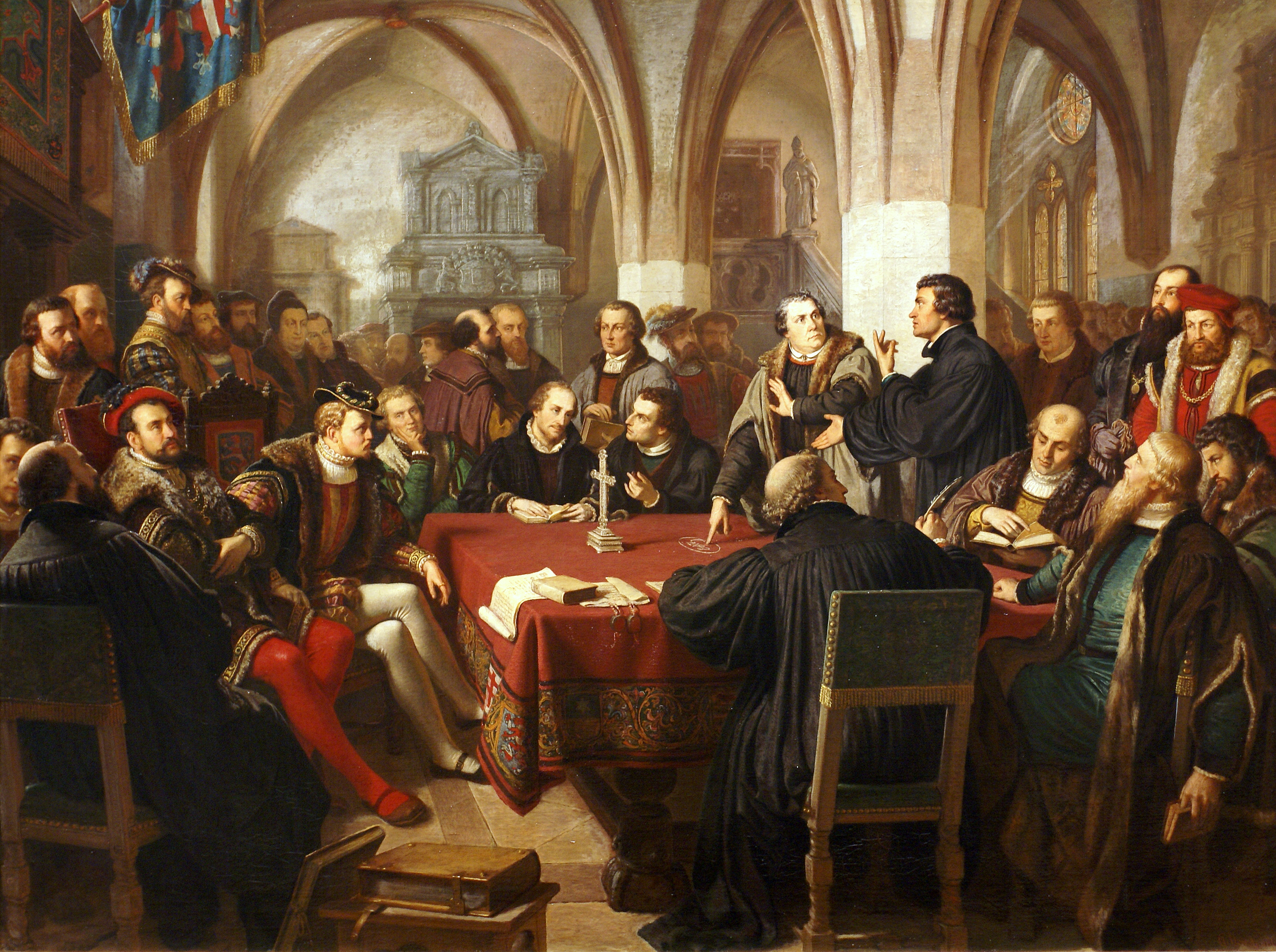
The Marburg Colloquy, by August Noack

In October 1529, Philip I, Landgrave of Hesse, convoked an assembly of German and Swiss theologians at the Marburg Colloquy, to establish doctrinal unity in the emerging Protestant states. Agreement was achieved on fourteen points out of fifteen, the exception being the nature of the Eucharist, the sacrament of the Lord's Supper, an issue crucial to Luther. The theologians, including Zwingli, Melanchthon, Martin Bucer, and Johannes Oecolampadius, differed on the significance of the words spoken by Jesus at the Last Supper: "This is my body which is for you" and "This cup is the new covenant in my blood" (1 Corinthians 11:23–26). Luther insisted on the Real presence of the body and blood of Christ in the consecrated bread and wine, which he called the sacramental union, while his opponents believed God to be only spiritually or symbolically present.

Zwingli, for example, denied Jesus' ability to be in more than one place at a time. Luther stressed the omnipresence of Jesus' human nature. According to transcripts, the debate sometimes became confrontational. Citing Jesus' words "The flesh profiteth nothing" (John 6.63), Zwingli said, "This passage breaks your neck". "Don't be too proud", Luther retorted, "German necks don't break that easily. This is Hesse, not Switzerland." On his table Luther wrote the words "Hoc est corpus meum" ("This is my body") in chalk, to continually indicate his firm stance.

Despite the disagreements on the Eucharist, the Marburg Colloquy paved the way for the signing in 1530 of the Augsburg Confession, and for the formation of the Schmalkaldic League the following year by leading Protestant nobles such as John of Saxony, Philip of Hesse, and George, Margrave of Brandenburg-Ansbach. The Swiss cities, however, did not sign these agreements.

=== Epistemology of faith and reason ===
Some scholars have asserted that Luther taught that faith and reason were antithetical in the sense that questions of faith could not be illuminated by reason. He wrote, "All the articles of our Christian faith, which God has revealed to us in His Word, are in presence of reason sheerly impossible, absurd, and false." and "[That] Reason in no way contributes to faith. [...] For reason is the greatest enemy that faith has; it never comes to the aid of spiritual things." However, though seemingly contradictorily, he also wrote in the latter work that human reason "strives not against faith, when enlightened, but rather furthers and advances it", bringing claims he was a fideist into dispute. Contemporary Lutheran scholarship, however, has found a different reality in Luther. Luther rather seeks to separate faith and reason in order to honour the separate spheres of knowledge that each applies to.

=== On Islam ===
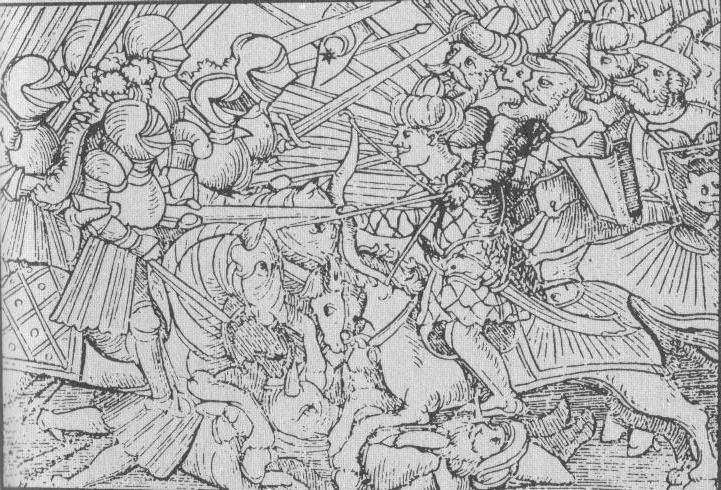
The 16th-century battle between the Turks and the Christians

At the time of the Marburg Colloquy, Suleiman the Magnificent was besieging Vienna with a vast Ottoman army. Luther had argued against resisting the Turks in his 1518 Explanation of the Ninety-five Theses, provoking accusations of defeatism. He saw the Turks as a scourge sent by God to punish Christians, as agents of the biblical apocalypse that would destroy the Antichrist, whom Luther believed to be the papacy and the Roman Church. He consistently rejected the idea of a Holy War, "as though our people were an army of Christians against the Turks, who were enemies of Christ. This is absolutely contrary to Christ's doctrine and name". On the other hand, in keeping with his doctrine of the two kingdoms, Luther did support non-religious war against the Turks. In 1526, he argued in Whether Soldiers can be in a State of Grace that national defence is reason for a just war. By 1529, in On War against the Turk, he was actively urging Emperor Charles V and the German people to fight a secular war against the Turks. He made clear, however, that the spiritual war against an alien faith was separate, to be waged through prayer and repentance. Around the time of the Siege of Vienna, Luther wrote a prayer for national deliverance from the Turks, asking God to "give to our emperor perpetual victory over our enemies".

In 1542, Luther read a Latin translation of the Qur'an. He went on to produce several critical pamphlets on Islam, which he called "Mohammedanism" or "the Turk". Though Luther saw the Muslim religion as a tool of the devil, he was indifferent to its practice: "Let the Turk believe and live as he will, just as one lets the papacy and other false Christians live." He opposed banning the publication of the Qur'an, wanting it exposed to scrutiny.

=== Antinomian controversy ===
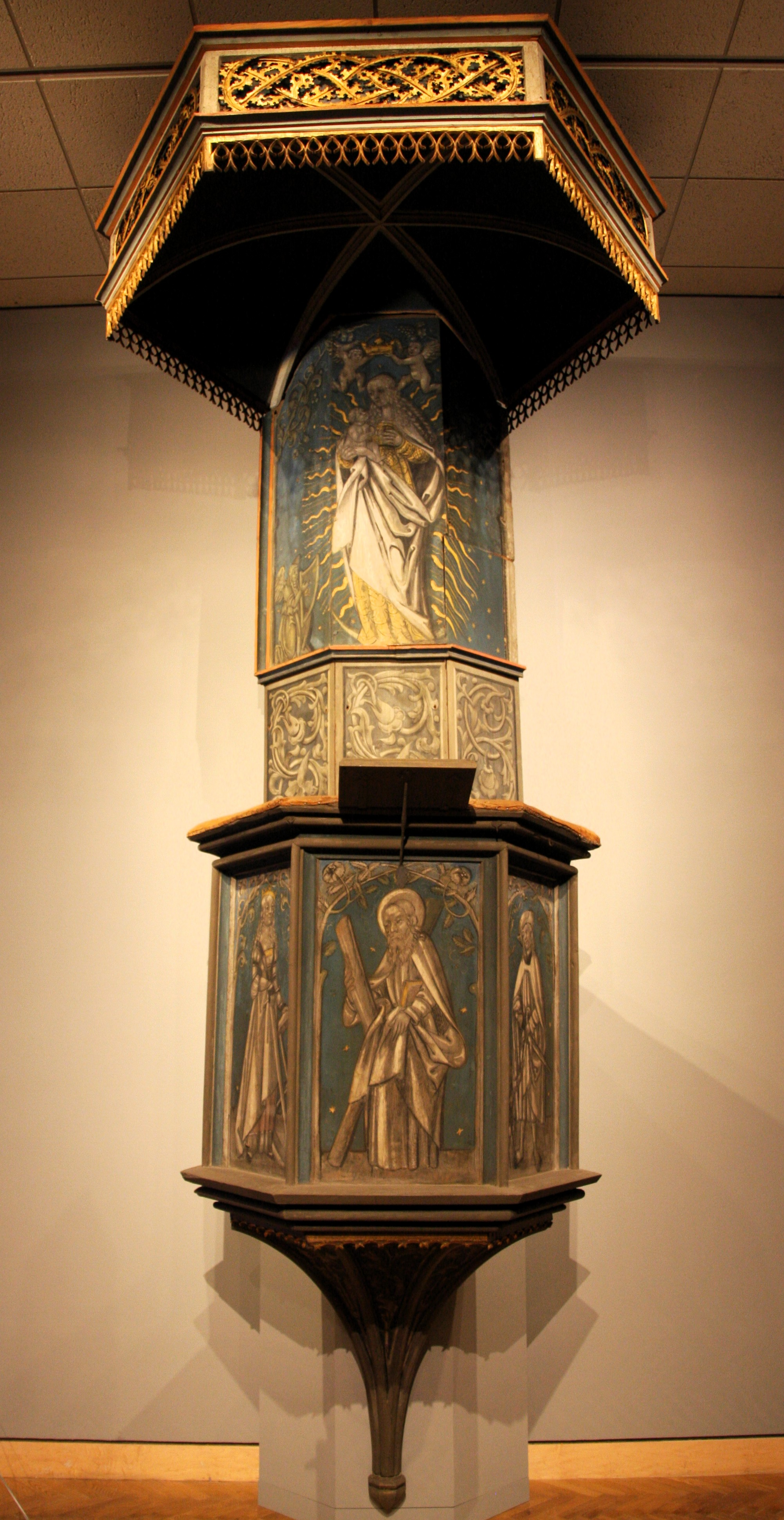
Pulpit of St Andreas Church, Eisleben, where Johannes Agricola and Luther preached

Early in 1537, Johannes Agricola—serving at the time as pastor in Luther's birthplace, Eisleben—preached a sermon in which he claimed that God's gospel, not God's moral law (the Ten Commandments), revealed God's wrath to Christians. Based on this sermon and others by Agricola, Luther suspected that Agricola was behind certain anonymous antinomian theses circulating in Wittenberg. These theses asserted that the law is no longer to be taught to Christians but belonged only to city hall. Luther responded to these theses with six series of theses against Agricola and the antinomians, four of which became the basis for disputations between 1538 and 1540. He also responded to these assertions in other writings, such as his 1539 open letter to C. Güttel Against the Antinomians, and his book On the Councils and the Church from the same year.

In his theses and disputations against the antinomians, Luther reviews and reaffirms, on the one hand, what has been called the "second use of the law", that is, the law as the Holy Spirit's tool to work sorrow over sin in man's heart, thus preparing him for Christ's fulfillment of the law offered in the gospel. Luther states that everything that is used to work sorrow over sin is called the law, even if it is Christ's life, Christ's death for sin, or God's goodness experienced in creation. Simply refusing to preach the Ten Commandments among Christians—thereby, as it were, removing the three letters l-a-w from the church—does not eliminate the accusing law. Claiming that the law—in any form—should not be preached to Christians anymore would be tantamount to asserting that Christians are no longer sinners in themselves and that the church consists only of essentially holy people.

Luther also points out that the Ten Commandments—when considered not as God's condemning judgment but as an expression of his eternal will, that is, of the natural law—positively teach how the Christian ought to live. This has traditionally been called the "third use of the law." (Note: The "first use of the law", accordingly, would be the law used as an external means of order and coercion in the political realm by means of bodily rewards and punishments.) For Luther, also Christ's life, when understood as an example, is nothing more than an illustration of the Ten Commandments, which a Christian should follow in his or her vocations on a daily basis.

=== Bigamy of Philip I, Landgrave of Hesse: 1539–1540 ===
From December 1539, Luther became involved in the designs of Philip I, Landgrave of Hesse to marry a lady-in-waiting of his wife, Christine of Saxony. Philip solicited the approval of Luther, Melanchthon, and Bucer, citing as a precedent the polygamy of the patriarchs. The theologians were not prepared to make a general ruling, and they reluctantly advised the landgrave that if he was determined, he should marry secretly and keep quiet about the matter because divorce was worse than bigamy. (Note: For a more extensive list of quotes from Luther on the topic of polygamy, see page 11 and following of Luther's Authentic Voice on Polygamy Archived 20 January 2019 at the Wayback Machine Nathan R. Jastram, Concordia Theological Journal, Fall 2015/Spring 2016, Volume 3) As a result, on 4 March 1540, Philip married a second wife, Margarethe von der Saale, with Melanchthon and Bucer among the witnesses. Philip's sister Elisabeth quickly made the scandal public, and Philip threatened to expose Luther's advice. Luther told him to "tell a good, strong lie" and deny the marriage completely, which Philip did. Margarethe gave birth to nine children over a span of 17 years, giving Philip a total of 19 children. In the view of Luther's biographer Martin Brecht, "giving confessional advice for Philip of Hesse was one of the worst mistakes Luther made, and, next to the landgrave himself, who was directly responsible for it, history chiefly holds Luther accountable". Brecht argues that Luther's mistake was not that he gave private pastoral advice, but that he miscalculated the political implications. The affair caused lasting damage to Luther's reputation.

=== Anti-Jewish polemics and antisemitism: 1543–1544 ===
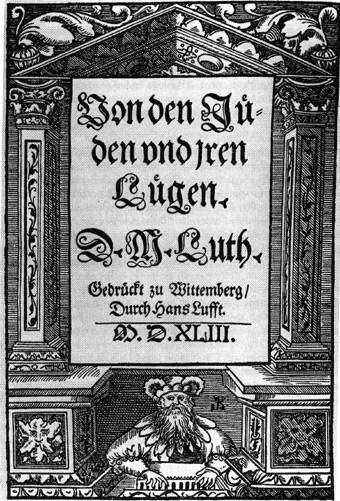
The original title page of On the Jews and Their Lies, written by Martin Luther in 1543

Although Luther rarely encountered Jews, he wrote negatively about them throughout his career, and his attitudes reflected a theological and cultural tradition which saw Jews as a rejected people guilty of the murder of Christ, and he lived in a locality which had expelled Jews roughly 90 years earlier. He considered the Jews blasphemers and liars because they rejected the divinity of Jesus. In 1523, Luther advised kindness toward the Jews in That Jesus Christ was Born a Jew and also aimed to convert them to Christianity. When his efforts at conversion failed, he grew increasingly bitter toward them.

Luther's major works on the Jews were his 60,000-word treatise Von den Juden und Ihren Lügen (On the Jews and Their Lies), and Vom Schem Hamphoras und vom Geschlecht Christi (On the Holy Name and the Lineage of Christ), both published in 1543, three years before his death. Luther argued that the Jews were no longer the chosen people but "the devil's people", and referred to them with violent language. Citing Deuteronomy 13, wherein Moses commands the killing of idolaters and the burning of their cities and property as an offering to God, Luther called for a "scharfe Barmherzigkeit" ("sharp mercy") against the Jews "to see whether we might save at least a few from the glowing flames." Luther advocated setting synagogues on fire, destroying Jewish prayerbooks, forbidding rabbis from preaching, seizing Jews' property and money, and smashing up their homes, so that these "envenomed worms" would be forced into labour or expelled "for all time". In Robert Michael's view, Luther's words "We are at fault in not slaying them" amounted to a sanction for murder. "God's anger with them is so intense", Luther concluded, "that gentle mercy will only tend to make them worse, while sharp mercy will reform them but little. Therefore, in any case, away with them!"

Luther launched a polemic against vagrants in his 1528 preface to Liber Vagatorum, saying that the Jews had contributed Hebrew words as a main basis of the Rotwelsch cryptolect. He warned in the admonitory preface Christians not to give them alms as it was, in his opinion, to forsake the truly poor.

Luther spoke out against the Jews in Saxony, Brandenburg, and Silesia. Josel of Rosheim, the Jewish spokesman who tried to help the Jews of Saxony in 1537, later blamed their plight on "that priest whose name was Martin Luther—may his body and soul be bound up in hell!—who wrote and issued many heretical books in which he said that whoever would help the Jews was doomed to perdition." Josel asked the city of Strasbourg to forbid the sale of Luther's anti-Jewish works: they refused initially but did so when a Lutheran pastor in Hochfelden used a sermon to urge his parishioners to murder Jews. Luther's influence persisted after his death. Throughout the 1580s, riots led to the expulsion of Jews from several German Lutheran states.

Tovia Singer, an Orthodox Jewish rabbi, remarking about Luther's attitude toward Jews, put it thus: "Among all the Church Fathers and Reformers, there was no mouth more vile, no tongue that uttered more vulgar curses against the Children of Israel than this founder of the Reformation."

=== Final years, illness and death ===
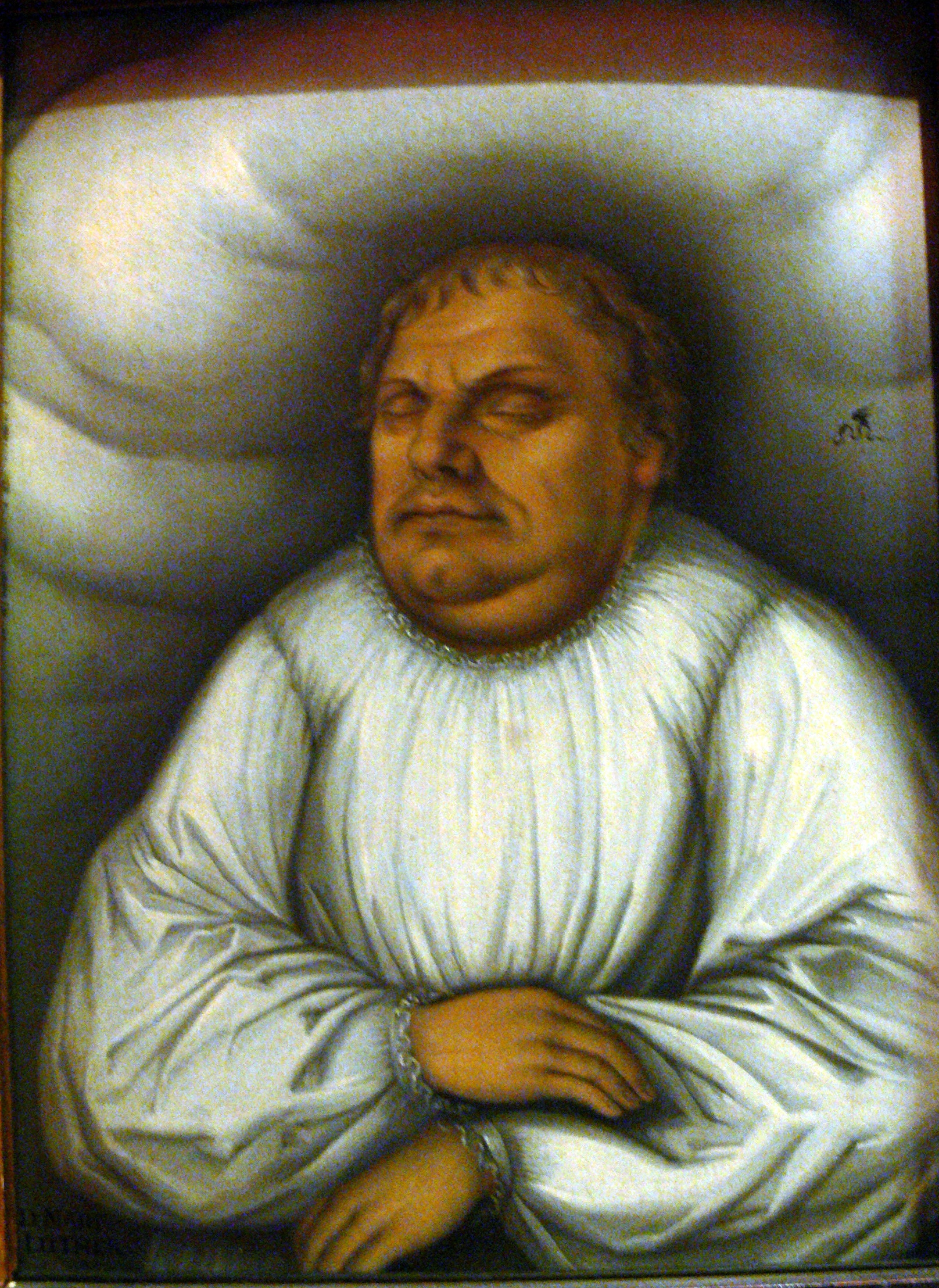
Luther on his deathbed, a portrait by Lucas Cranach the Elder

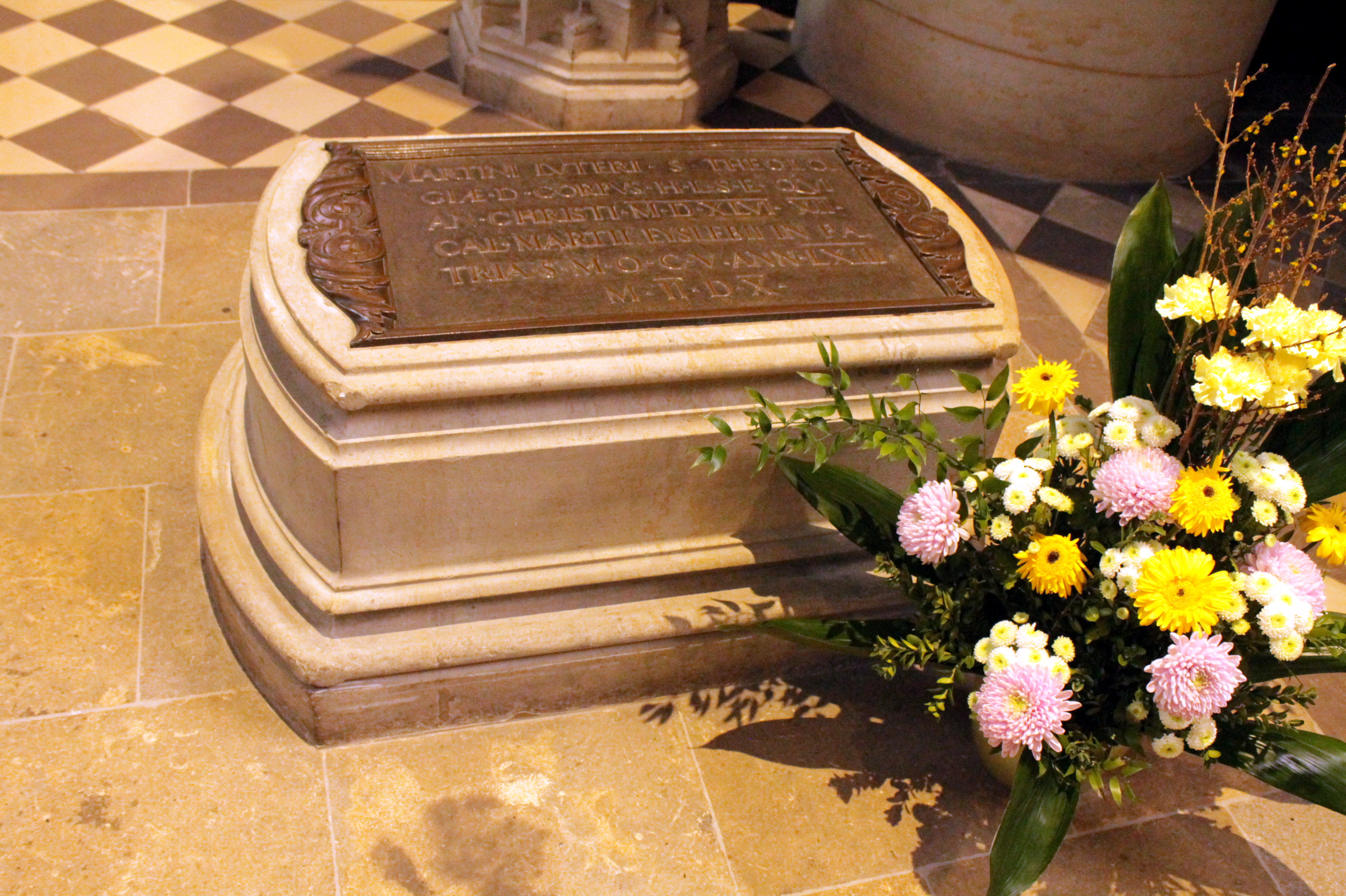
Luther's grave in Schlosskirche, Wittenberg

Luther had been suffering from ill health for years, including Ménière's disease, vertigo, fainting, tinnitus, and a cataract in one eye. From 1531 to 1546, his health deteriorated further. In 1536, he began to suffer from kidney and bladder stones, arthritis, and an ear infection which ruptured an ear drum. In December 1544, he began to feel the effects of angina.

His poor physical health made him short-tempered and even harsher in his writings and comments. His wife Katharina was overheard saying, "Dear husband, you are too rude", and he responded, "They are teaching me to be rude." In 1545 and 1546 Luther preached three times in the Market Church in Halle, staying with his friend Justus Jonas during Christmas.

His last sermon was delivered at Eisleben, his place of birth, on 15 February 1546, three days before his death. It was "entirely devoted to the obdurate Jews, whom it was a matter of great urgency to expel from all German territory", according to Léon Poliakov. James Mackinnon writes that it concluded with a "fiery summons to drive the Jews bag and baggage from their midst, unless they desisted from their calumny and their usury and became Christians." Luther said, "we want to practice Christian love toward them and pray that they convert", but also that they are "our public enemies ... and if they could kill us all, they would gladly do so. And so often they do."

Luther's final journey, to Mansfeld, was taken because of his concern for his siblings' families continuing in their father Hans Luther's copper mining trade. Their livelihood was threatened by Count Albrecht of Mansfeld bringing the industry under his own control. The controversy that ensued involved all four Mansfeld counts: Albrecht, Philip, John George, and Gerhard. Luther journeyed to Mansfeld twice in late 1545 to participate in the negotiations for a settlement, and a third visit was needed in early 1546 for their completion.

The negotiations were successfully concluded on 17 February 1546. After 8 p.m., he experienced chest pains. When he went to his bed, he prayed, "Into your hand I commit my spirit; you have redeemed me, O Lord, faithful God" (Ps. 31:5), the common prayer of the dying. At 1 a.m. on 18 February, he awoke with more chest pain and was warmed with hot towels. He thanked God for revealing his Son to him in whom he had believed. His companions, Justus Jonas and Michael Coelius, shouted loudly, "Reverend father, are you ready to die trusting in your Lord Jesus Christ and to confess the doctrine which you have taught in his name?" A distinct "Yes" was Luther's reply.

An apoplectic stroke deprived him of his speech, and he died shortly afterwards at 2:45 a.m. on 18 February 1546, aged 62, in Eisleben, the city of his birth. He was buried in the Schlosskirche in Wittenberg, in front of the pulpit. The funeral was held by his friends Johannes Bugenhagen and Philipp Melanchthon. A year later, troops of Luther's adversary Charles V, Holy Roman Emperor entered the town but were ordered by Charles not to disturb the grave.

A piece of paper was later found on which Luther had written his last statement. The statement was in Latin, apart from "We are beggars", which was in German. The statement reads:

1. No one can understand Virgil's Bucolics unless he has been a shepherd for five years. No one can understand Virgil's Georgics, unless he has been a farmer for five years.
2. No one can understand Cicero's Letters (or so I teach), unless he has busied himself in the affairs of some prominent state for twenty years.
3. Know that no one can have indulged in the Holy Writers sufficiently, unless he has governed churches for a hundred years with the prophets, such as Elijah and Elisha, John the Baptist, Christ and the apostles.

Do not assail this divine Aeneid; nay, rather prostrate revere the ground that it treads.

We are beggars: this is true. (Note: Original German and Latin of Luther's last written words is: "Wir sein pettler. Hoc est verum.")

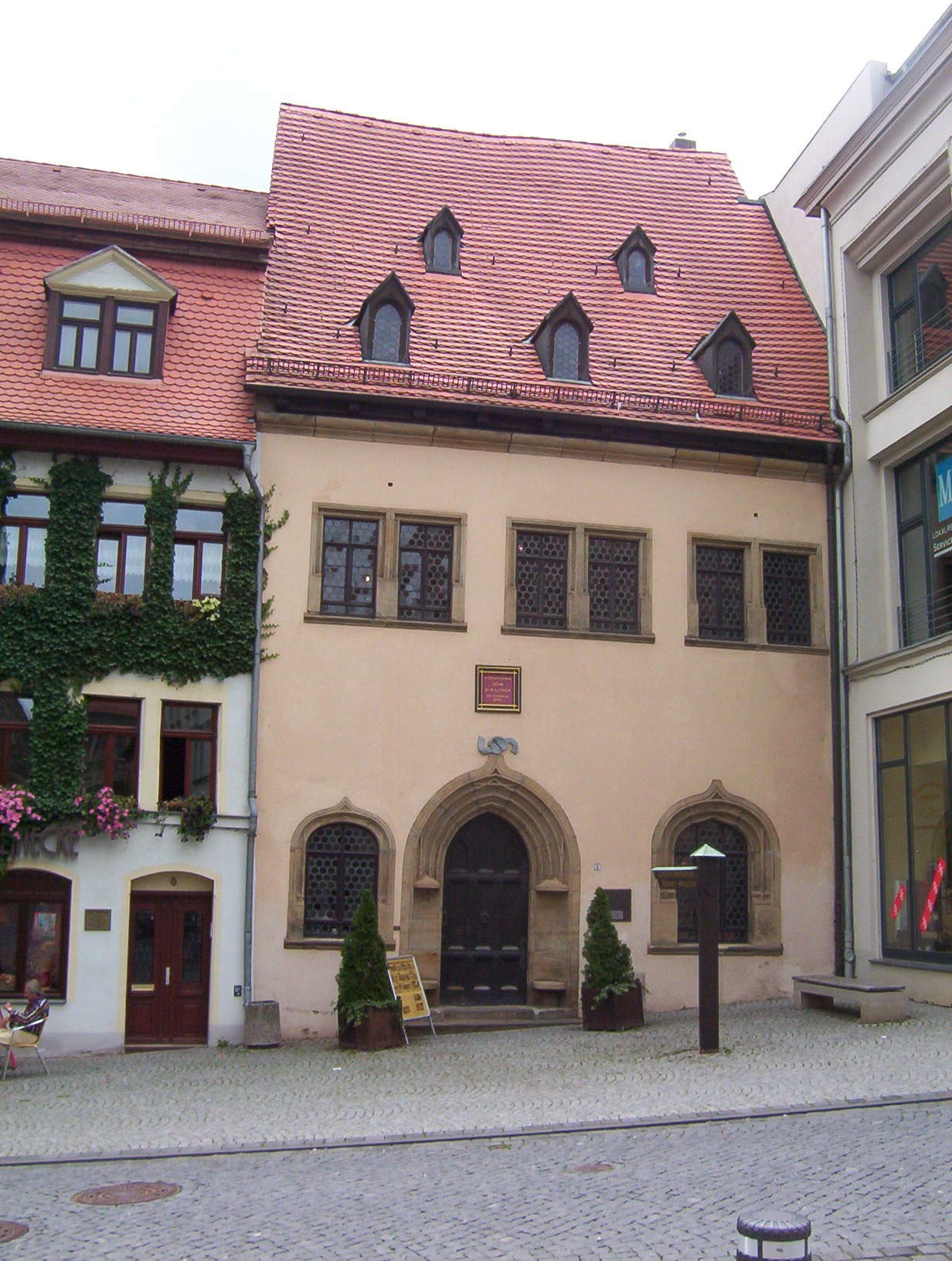
Martin Luther's Death House, considered the site of Luther's death since 1726. However, the building where Luther actually died (at Markt 56, now the site of Hotel Graf von Mansfeld) was torn down in 1570.

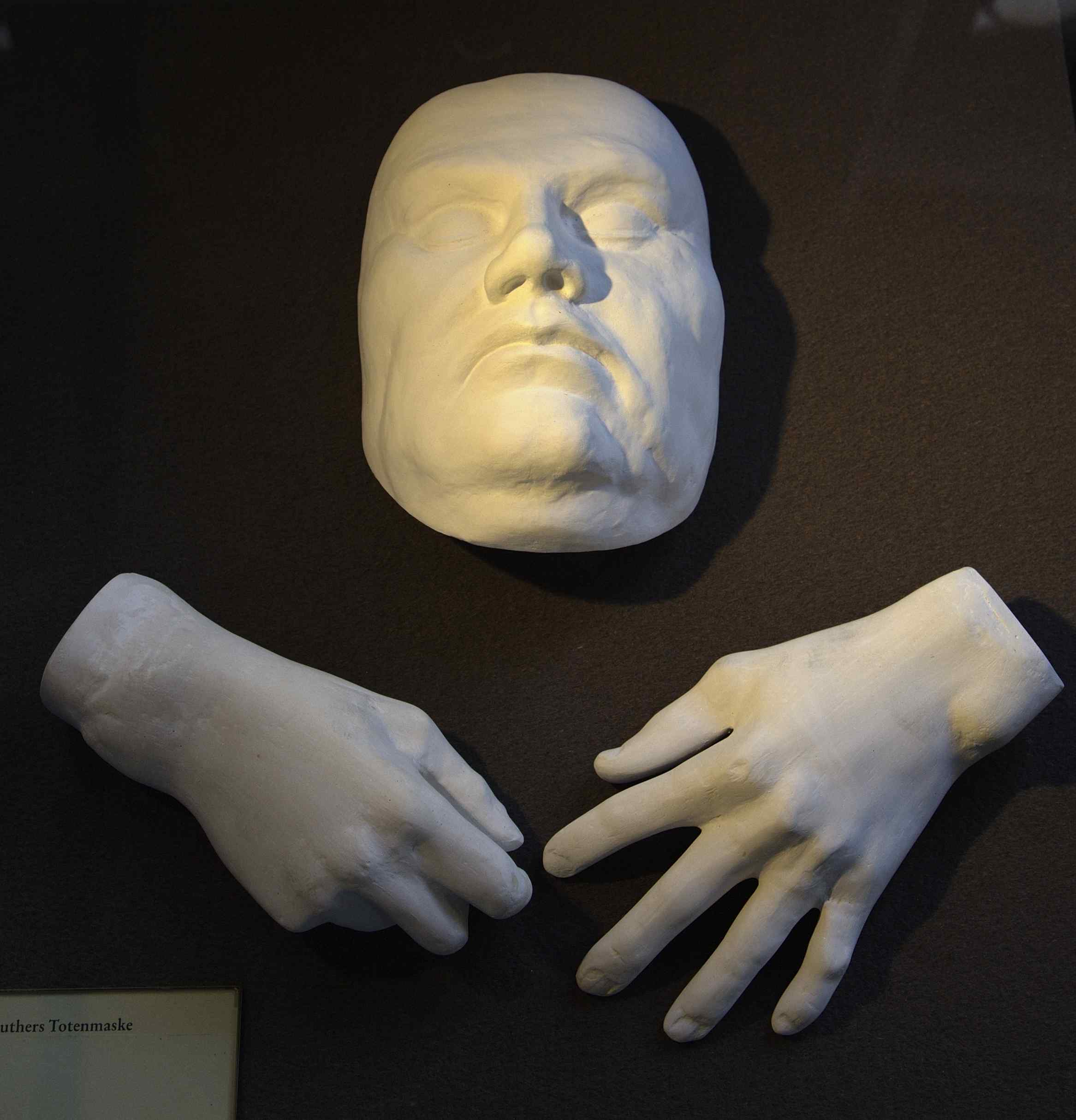
Casts of Luther's face and hands at his death, in the Market Church in Halle

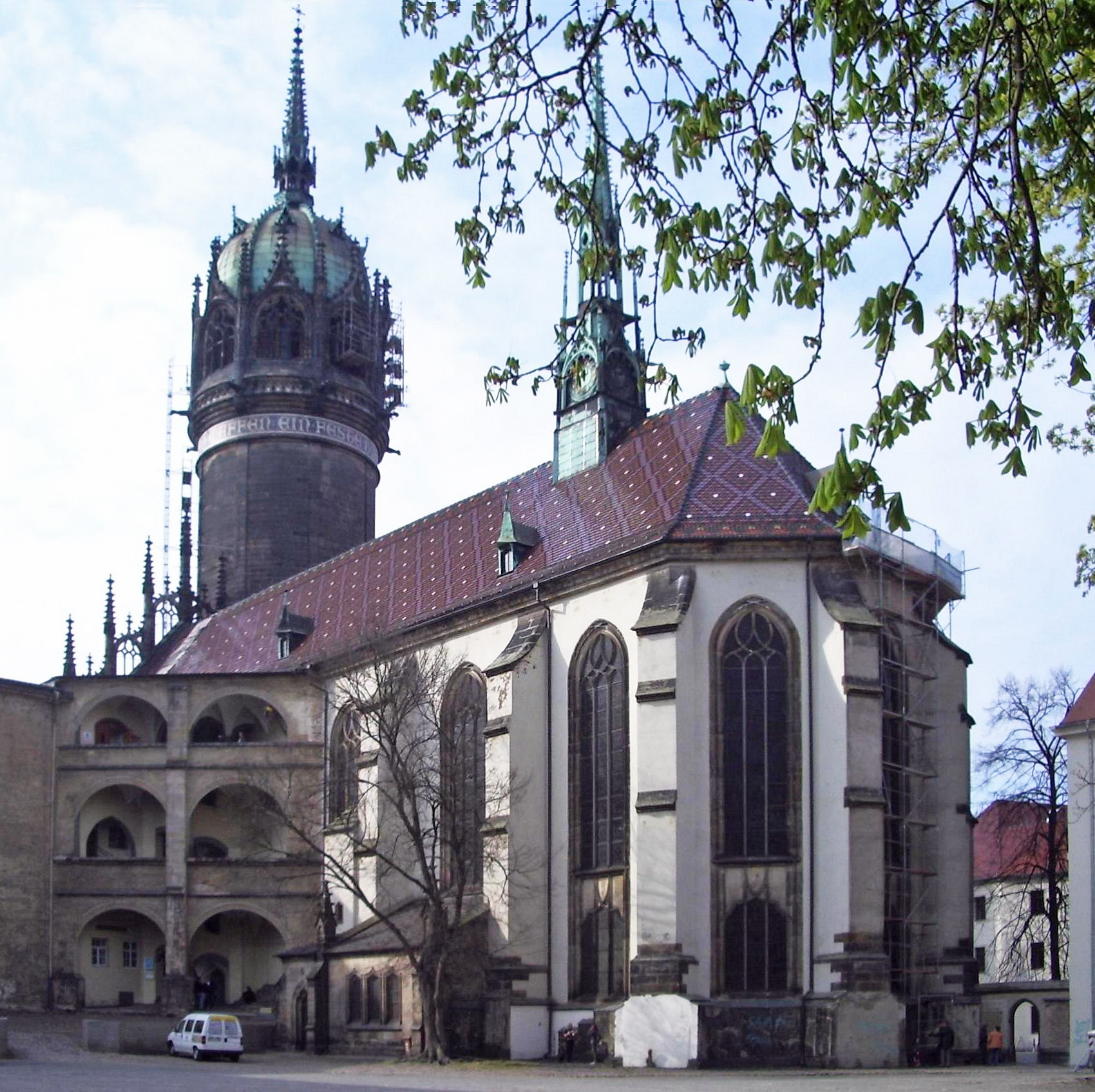
Schlosskirche in Wittenberg, where Luther posted his Ninety-five Theses, is also his gravesite.

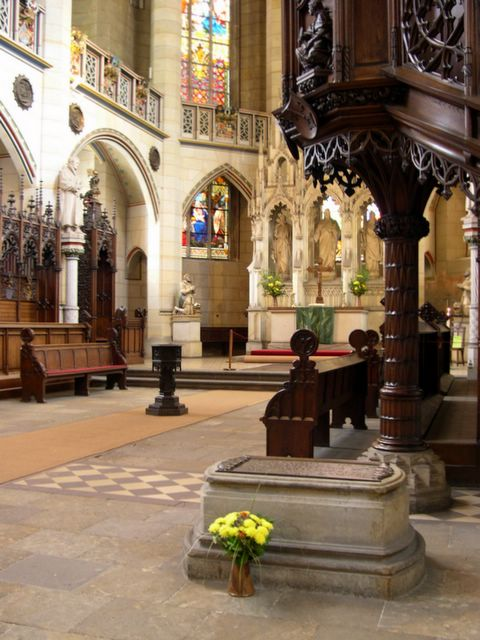
Luther's tombstone beneath the pulpit in the Castle Church in Wittenberg

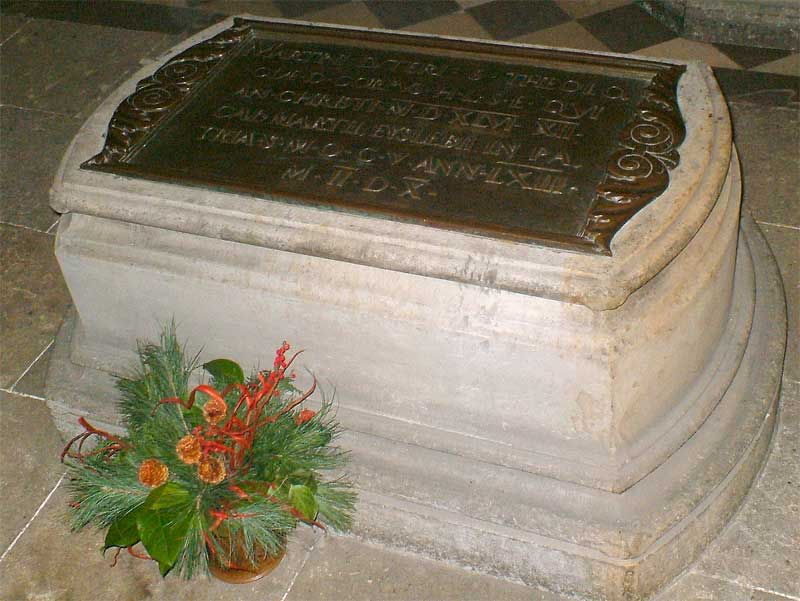
Close-up of the grave with inscription in Latin

== Posthumous influence within Nazism ==
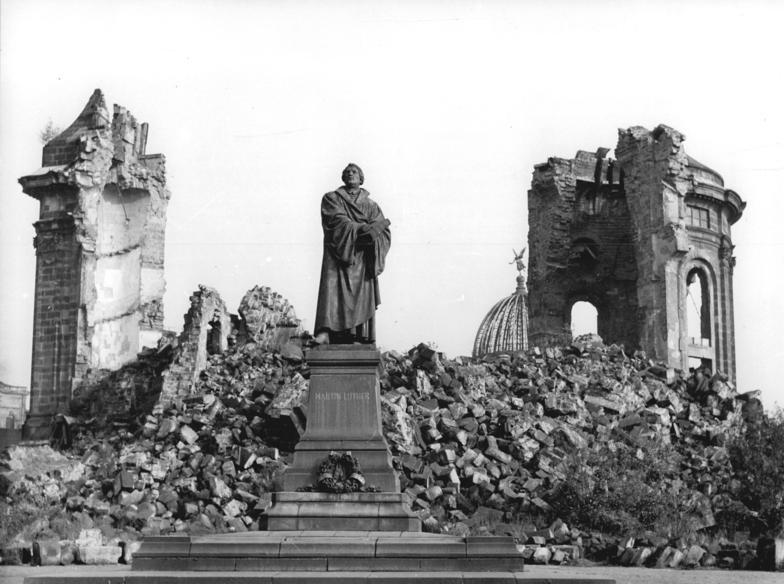
The statue outside the Frauenkirche in Dresden after the bombing of the city in World War II

Luther was the most widely read author of his generation, and within Germany he acquired the status of a prophet. According to the prevailing opinion among historians, his anti-Jewish rhetoric contributed significantly to the development of antisemitism in Germany, and in the 1930s and 1940s provided an "ideal underpinning" for the Nazis' attacks on Jews. Reinhold Lewin writes that anybody who "wrote against the Jews for whatever reason believed he had the right to justify himself by triumphantly referring to Luther." According to Michael, just about every anti-Jewish book printed in Nazi Germany contained references to and quotations from Luther. Heinrich Himmler (albeit never a Lutheran, having been brought up Catholic before abandoning the faith for occult interests) wrote admiringly of his writings and sermons on the Jews in 1940. (Note: Himmler wrote: "what Luther said and wrote about the Jews. No judgment could be sharper.") The city of Nuremberg presented a first edition of On the Jews and their Lies to Julius Streicher, editor of the Nazi newspaper Der Stürmer, on his birthday in 1937; the newspaper described it as the most radically antisemitic tract ever published. It was publicly exhibited in a glass case at the Nuremberg rallies and quoted in a 54-page explanation of the Aryan Law by E.H. Schulz and R. Frercks.

On 17 December 1941, seven Protestant regional church confederations issued a statement agreeing with the policy of forcing Jews to wear the yellow badge, "since after his bitter experience Luther had already suggested preventive measures against the Jews and their expulsion from German territory." According to Daniel Goldhagen, Bishop Martin Sasse, a leading Protestant churchman, published a compendium of Luther's writings shortly after Kristallnacht, for which Diarmaid MacCulloch, professor of the history of the church at the University of Oxford argued that Luther's writing was a "blueprint". Sasse applauded the burning of the synagogues and the coincidence of the day, writing in the introduction, "On 10 November 1938, on Luther's birthday, the synagogues are burning in Germany." The German people, he urged, ought to heed these words "of the greatest antisemite of his time, the warner of his people against the Jews."

"There is a world of difference between his belief in salvation and a racial ideology. Nevertheless, his misguided agitation had the evil result that Luther fatefully became one of the 'church fathers' of anti-Semitism and thus provided material for the modern hatred of the Jews, cloaking it with the authority of the Reformer."

— Martin Brecht

At the heart of scholarly debate about Luther's influence is whether it is anachronistic to view his work as a precursor of the racial antisemitism of the Nazis. Some scholars see Luther's influence as limited, and the Nazis' use of his work as opportunistic. Johannes Wallmann argues that Luther's writings against the Jews were largely ignored in the 18th and 19th centuries, and that there was no continuity between Luther's thought and Nazi ideology. Uwe Siemon-Netto agreed, arguing that it was because the Nazis were already antisemites that they revived Luther's work. Hans Joachim Hillerbrand agreed that to focus on Luther was to adopt an essentially ahistorical perspective of Nazi antisemitism that ignored other contributory factors in German history. (Note: Hillerbrand writes: "His strident pronouncements against the Jews, especially toward the end of his life, have raised the question of whether Luther significantly encouraged the development of German anti-Semitism. Although many scholars have taken this view, this perspective puts far too much emphasis on Luther and not enough on the larger peculiarities of German history.") Similarly, Roland Bainton, noted church historian and Luther biographer, wrote "One could wish that Luther had died before ever [On the Jews and Their Lies] was written. His position was entirely religious and in no respect racial." (Note: For similar views, see: Briese, Russell. "Martin Luther and the Jews", Lutheran Forum (Summer 2000):32; Brecht 1999, p. 351; Edwards, Mark U. Jr. Luther's Last Battles: Politics and Polemics 1531–46. Ithaca, New York: Cornell University Press, 1983, 139; Gritsch, Eric. "Was Luther Anti-Semitic?", Christian History, No. 3:39, 12.; Kittelson 1986, p. 243; Oberman, Heiko. The Roots of Anti-Semitism: In the Age of Renaissance and Reformation. Philadelphia: Fortress, 1984, 102; Rupp, Gordon. Martin Luther, 75; Siemon-Netto, Uwe. Lutheran Witness, 19.) However, Christopher J. Probst, in his book Demonizing the Jews: Luther and the Protestant Church in Nazi Germany (2012), shows that a large number of German Protestant clergy and theologians during the Nazi era used Luther's hostile publications towards the Jews and their Jewish religion to justify at least in part the antisemitic policies of the National Socialists. The pro-Nazi Christian group Deutsche Christen drew parallels between Martin Luther and the "Führer" Adolf Hitler.

Some scholars, such as Mark U. Edwards in his book Luther's Last Battles: Politics and Polemics 1531–46 (1983), suggest that since Luther's increasingly antisemitic views developed during the years his health deteriorated, it is possible they were at least partly the product of a state of mind. Edwards also comments that Luther often deliberately used "vulgarity and violence" for effect, both in his writings condemning the Jews and in diatribes against "Turks" (Muslims) and Catholics.

Since the 1980s, Lutheran denominations have repudiated Martin Luther's statements against the Jews, calling them 'sins', and have rejected the use of them to incite hatred against Lutherans. Strommen et al.'s 1970 survey of 4,745 North American Lutherans aged 15–65 found that, compared to the other minority groups under consideration, Lutherans were the least prejudiced toward Jews. Nevertheless, Professor Richard Geary, former professor of modern history at the University of Nottingham and the author of Hitler and Nazism, examined electoral trends in Weimar Germany between 1928 and 1933 and notes that, based on his research, the Nazi Party received a higher proportion of votes from Protestant than Catholic areas of Germany.

== Legacy and commemoration ==
Worldwide Protestantism in 2010

Luther made effective use of Johannes Gutenberg's printing press to spread his views. He switched from Latin to German in his writing to appeal to a broader audience. Between 1500 and 1530, Luther's works represented one fifth of all materials printed in Germany.

In the 1530s and 1540s, printed images of Luther that emphasised his monumental size were crucial to the spread of Protestantism. In contrast to images of frail Catholic saints, Luther was presented as a stout man with a "double chin, strong mouth, piercing deep-set eyes, fleshy face, and squat neck." He was shown to be physically imposing, an equal in stature to the secular German princes with whom he would join forces to spread Lutheranism. His large body also let the viewer know that he did not shun earthly pleasures like drinking—behaviour that was a stark contrast to the ascetic life of the medieval religious orders. Images from this period include the woodcuts by Hans Brosamer (1530) and Lucas Cranach the Elder and Lucas Cranach the Younger (1546).

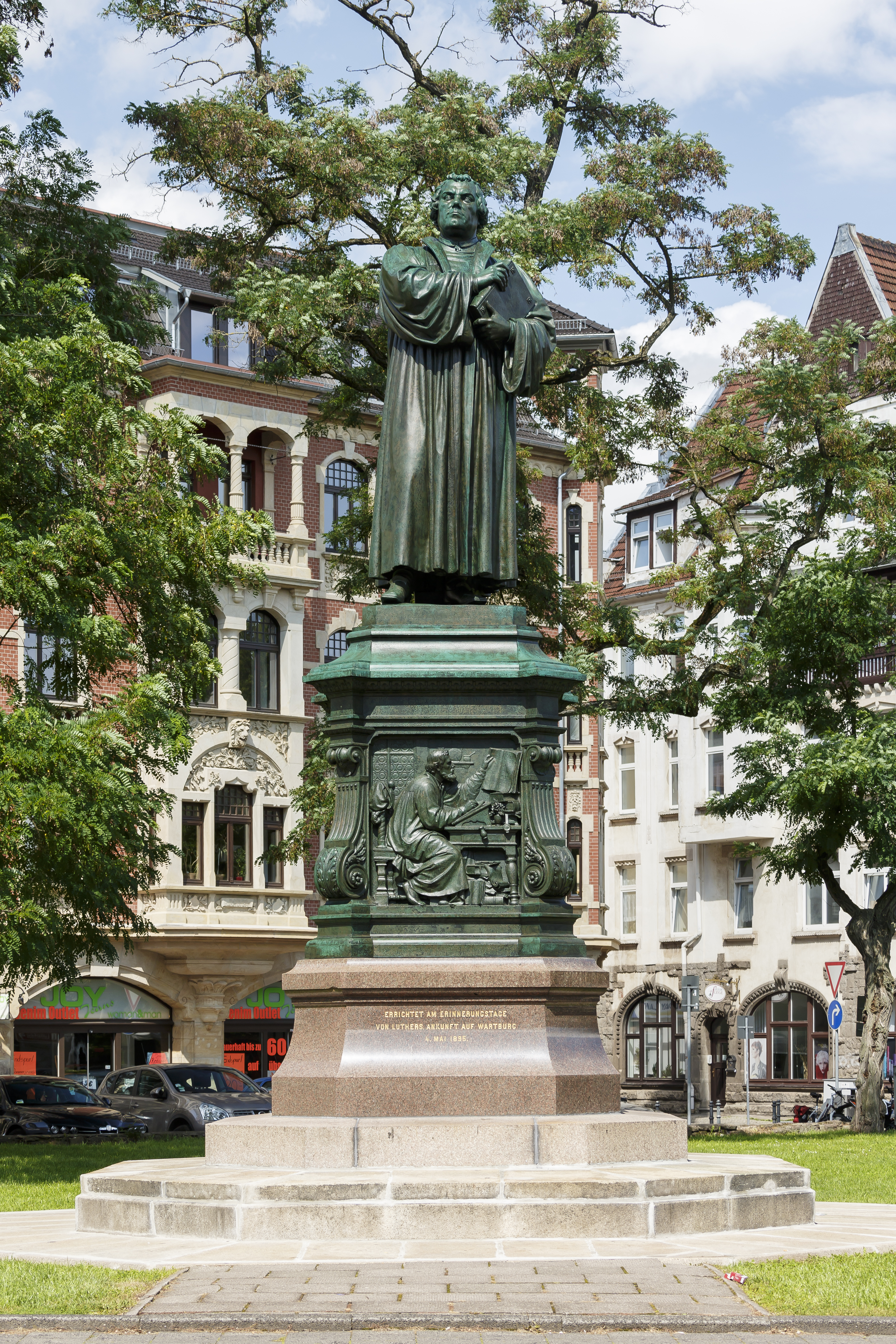
Luther Monument in Eisenach, Germany

Luther is honoured on 18 February with a commemoration in the Lutheran Calendar of Saints and in the Episcopal (United States) Calendar of Saints. In the Church of England's Calendar of Saints he is commemorated on 31 October. Luther is honoured in various ways by Christian traditions coming out directly from the Protestant Reformation, i.e. Lutheranism, the Reformed tradition, and Anglicanism. Branches of Protestantism that emerged afterwards vary in their remembrance and veneration of Luther, ranging from a complete lack of a single mention of him to a commemoration almost comparable to the way Lutherans commemorate and remember his persona. There is no known condemnation of Luther by Protestants themselves.

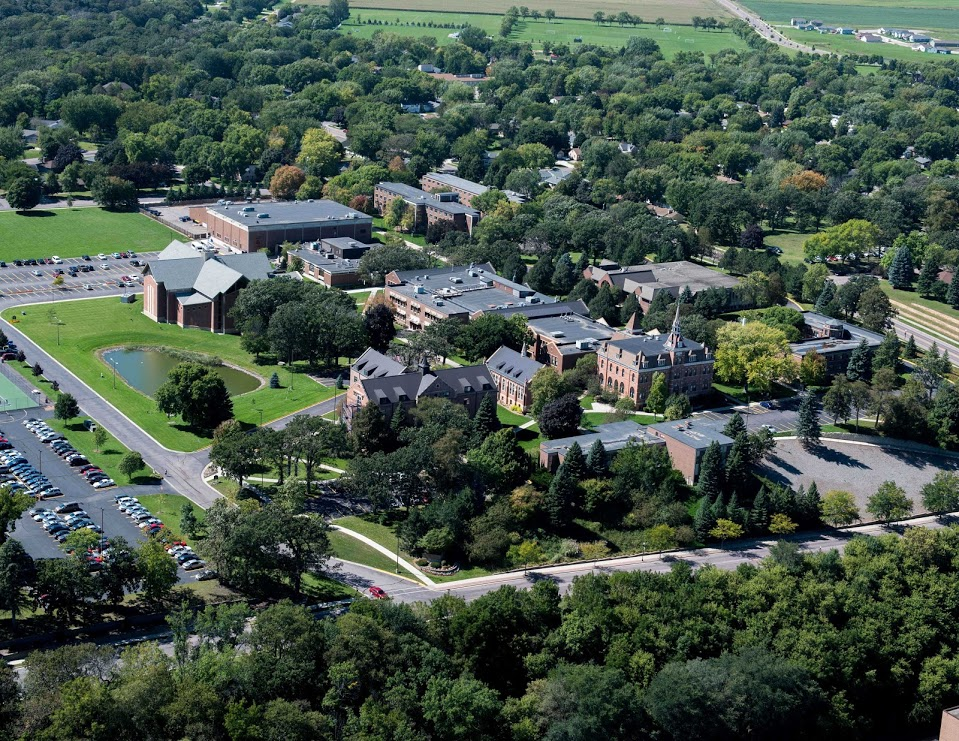
Martin Luther College in New Ulm, Minnesota, US.

Various sites both inside and outside Germany (supposedly) visited by Martin Luther throughout his lifetime commemorate it with local memorials. Saxony-Anhalt has two towns officially named after Luther, Lutherstadt Eisleben and Lutherstadt Wittenberg. Mansfeld is sometimes called Mansfeld-Lutherstadt, although the state government has not decided to put the Lutherstadt suffix in its official name.

Reformation Day commemorates the publication of the Ninety-five Theses in 1517. It is a public holiday in the German states of Brandenburg, Bremen, Lower Saxony, Mecklenburg-Vorpommern, Saxony, Saxony-Anhalt, Thuringia, Schleswig-Holstein and Hamburg. Slovenia celebrates it because of the profound contribution of the Reformation to its culture. Austria allows Protestant children not to go to school that day, and Protestant workers have a right to leave work in order to participate in a church service. Switzerland celebrates the holiday on the first Sunday after 31 October. It is also celebrated elsewhere around the world.

Members of the Filipino nontrinitarian new religious movement Iglesia ni Cristo believe that there are four messengers of God in the church era, namely Jesus Christ, Paul the Apostle, Luther, and Felix Manalo, with Manalo being the "last messenger", and Luther being his "predecessor".

== Luther and the swan ==
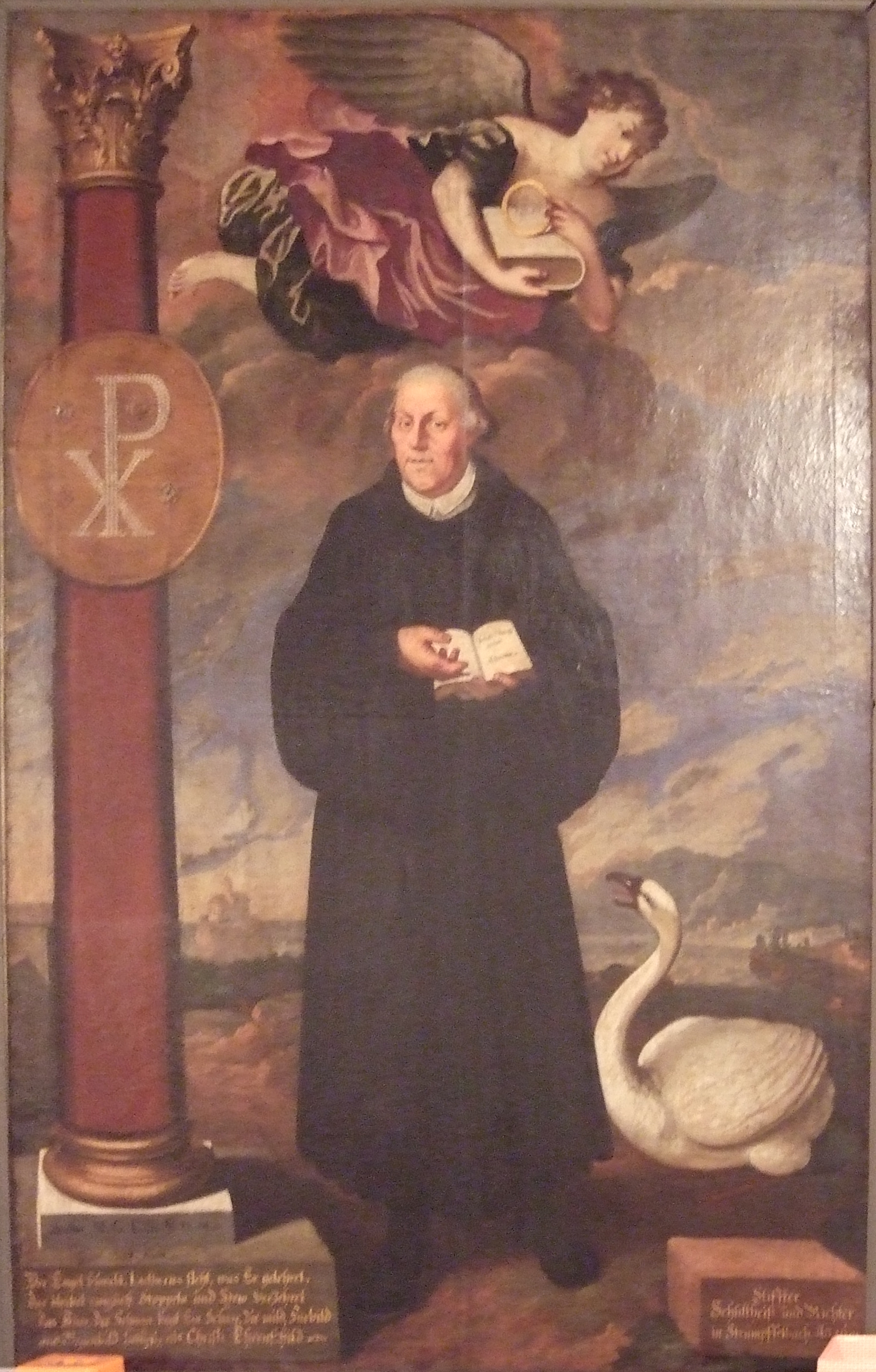
Luther with a swan (painting in the church at Strümpfelbach im Remstal, Weinstadt, Germany, by J. A. List)

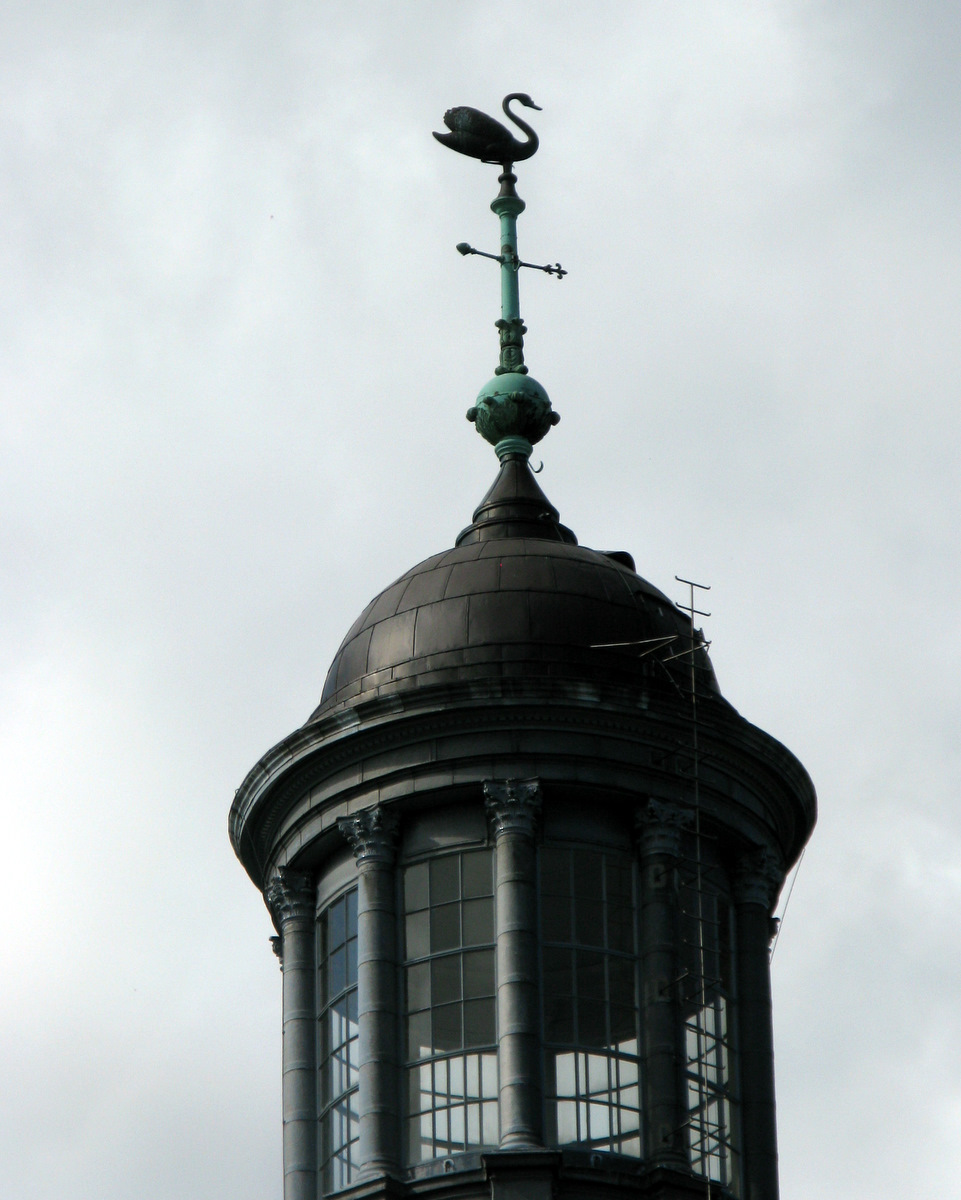
Swan weather vane, Round Lutheran Church, Amsterdam

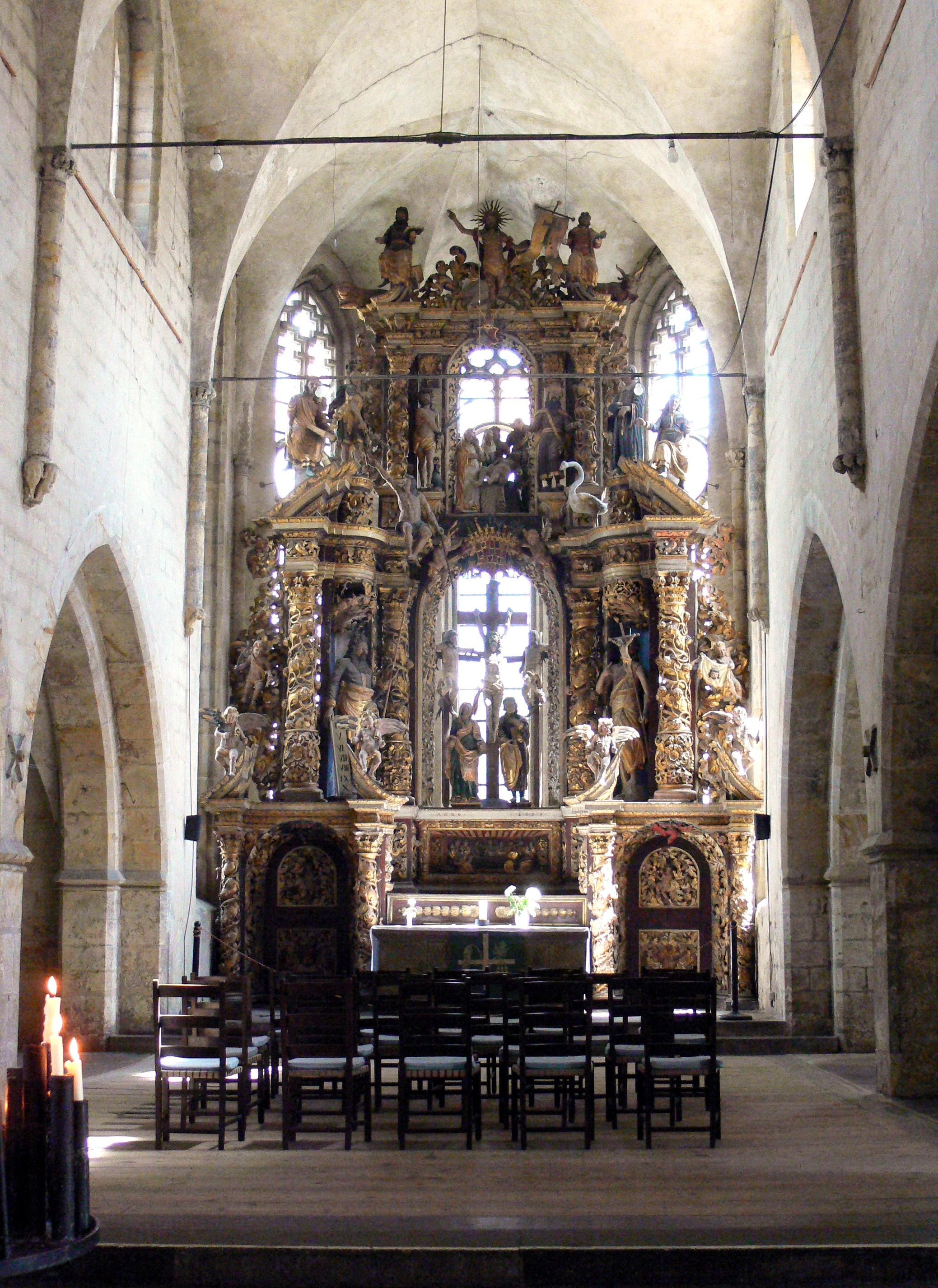
Altar in St Martin's Church, Halberstadt, Germany. Luther and the swan are toward the top on the right.

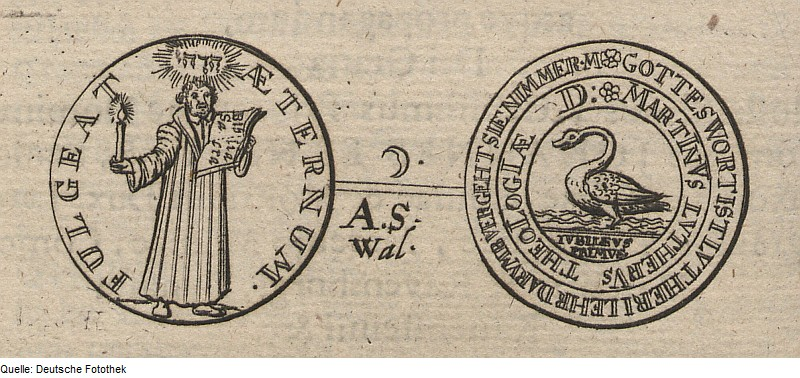
Coin commemorating Luther (engraving by Georg Wilhelm Göbel, Saxony, 1706)

Luther is often depicted with a swan as his attribute, and Lutheran churches often have a swan for a weather vane. This association with the swan arises out of an alleged prophecy reportedly made by the earlier reformer Jan Hus and endorsed by Luther. In the Bohemian language (now Czech), Hus's name meant "grey goose". In 1414, while imprisoned by the Council of Constance and anticipating his execution by burning for heresy, Hus allegedly prophesied, "Now they will roast a goose, but in a hundred years' time they'll hear a swan sing. They'd better listen to him." Luther published his Ninety-five Theses some 103 years later.

== Works and editions ==
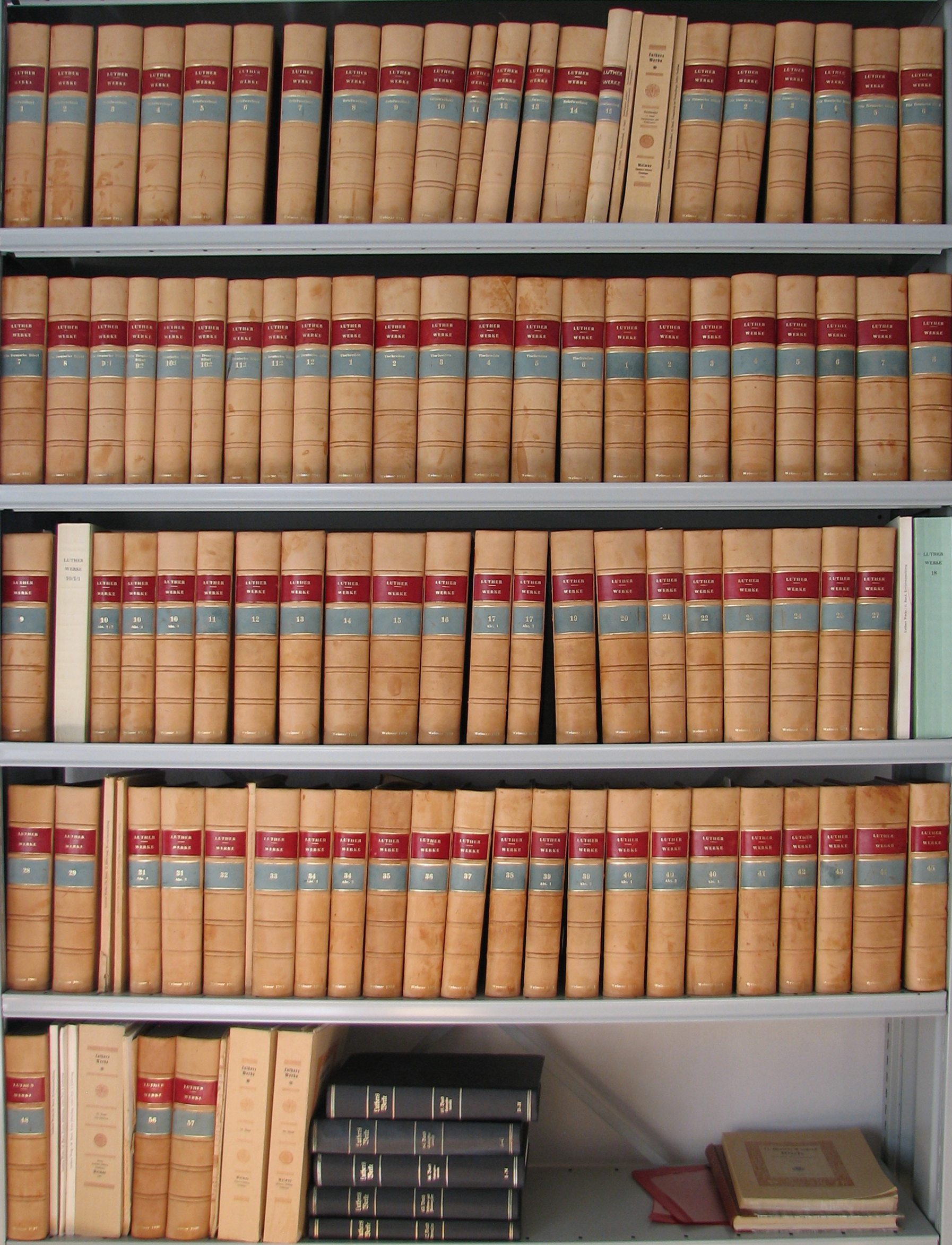
Various books of the Weimar Edition of Luther's works

- The Erlangen Edition (Erlangener Ausgabe: "EA"), comprising the Exegetica opera latina – Latin exegetical works of Luther.
- The Weimar Edition (Weimarer Ausgabe) is the exhaustive, standard German edition of Luther's Latin and German works, indicated by the abbreviation "WA". This is continued into "WA Br" Weimarer Ausgabe, Briefwechsel (correspondence), "WA Tr" Weimarer Ausgabe, Tischreden (tabletalk) and "WA DB" Weimarer Ausgabe, Deutsche Bibel (German Bible).
- The American Edition (Luther's Works) is the most extensive English translation of Luther's writings, indicated either by the abbreviation "LW" or "AE". The original 55 volumes were jointly published between 1955 and 1986 by Fortress Press and Concordia Publishing House. In 2009, Concordia began a continuation of the series, planned to run from volume 56 to volume 82.

== See also ==
- Antilegomena
- George of Hungary
- List of hymns by Martin Luther
- Luther's canon
- Luther's Marian theology
- Lutherhaus Eisenach
- Martin Luther's Birth House
- Propaganda during the Reformation
- Protestantism in Germany
- Resources about Martin Luther
- Theology of Martin Luther
- Bruder Martin
- Hochstratus Ovans
- Theologia Germanica

== Sources ==
- Bainton, Roland (1950). Here I Stand: A Life of Martin Luther. Nashville: Abingdon Press – via Internet Archive.
- Bainton, Roland (1955). Here I Stand: A Life of Martin Luther. New York: Mentor. OCLC 220064892.
- Bainton, Roland (1995). Here I Stand: A Life of Martin Luther. New York: Penguin.
- Brecht, Martin (1985). Martin Luther. Vol. 1: His Road to Reformation, 1483–1521. Translated by Schaaf, James L. Philadelphia: Fortress Press.
- Brecht, Martin (1994). Martin Luther. Vol. 2: Shaping and Defining the Reformation, 1521–1532. Translated by Schaaf, James L. Philadelphia: Fortress Press.
- Brecht, Martin (1999). Martin Luther. Vol. 3: The Preservation of the Church, 1532–1546. Translated by Schaaf, James L. Philadelphia: Fortress Press.
- Canale, Fernando (1 October 2012). "Sola Scriptura and Hermeneutics: Toward a Critical Assessment of the Methodological Ground of the Protestant Reformation". Faculty Publications. 50 (2): 179–205.
- Cummings, Brian (2002). The Literary Culture of the Reformation: Grammar and Grace. Oxford: Oxford University Press. doi:10.1093/acprof:oso/9780198187356.001.0001. ISBN 978-0-19-818735-6 – via Oxford Scholarship Online.
- Gritsch, Eric W. (2002). A history of Lutheranism. Minneapolis, Minnesota: Fortress Press. ISBN 978-0-8006-3472-8.
- Gritsch, Eric W. (2012). Martin Luther's Anti-Semitism: Against his Better Judgment. Grand Rapids, Michigan: W. B. Eerdmans. ISBN 978-0-8028-6676-9.
- Hendrix, Scott H. (2015). Martin Luther: Visionary Reformer. Yale University Press. ISBN 978-0-300-16669-9.
- Hughes, Michael (1992). Early Modern Germany: 1477–1806. London: Macmillan. ISBN 0-333-53774-2.
- Kittelson, James (1986). Luther The Reformer. Minneapolis: Augsburg Fortress Publishing House. p. 79.
- Lohse, Bernhard (1987). Martin Luther: An Introduction to his Life and Work. Translated by Schultz, Robert C. Edinburgh: T & T Clark. ISBN 0-567-09357-3.
- Luther, Martin (1854). Irmischer, Johann Konrad (ed.). Dr. Martin Luther's sämmtliche Werke [The Complete Works of Dr. Martin Luther] (in German). Vol. 59. Erlangen: Heyder – via HathiTrust.
- Luther, Martin (1955). Pelikan, Jaroslav; Lehmann, Helmuth; Brown, Christopher (eds.). Luther's Works. Concordia & Philadelphia: Fortress.
- Luther, Martin (2008). Sonntag, Holger (ed.). Only the Decalogue is eternal: Martin Luther's complete Antinomian theses and disputations. Minneapolis, Minnesota: Lutheran Press. ISBN 978-0-9748529-6-6.
- MacCulloch, Diarmaid (2003). Reformation: Europe's House Divided, 1490–1700. London: Allen Lane.
- Mackinnon, James (1925). Luther and the reformation. London; New York: Longmans, Green, and Co. – via Internet Archive.
- Marius, Richard (1975). Luther. London: Quartet. ISBN 0-7043-3192-6.
- Marty, Martin E. (2004). Martin Luther. New York: Viking Penguin. ISBN 0670032727.
- Michael, Robert (2006). Holy Hatred: Christianity, Antisemitism, and the Holocaust. New York: Palgrave Macmillan.
- Mullett, Michael A. (1986). Luther. Methuen & Co (Lancashire Pamphlets). ISBN 978-0-415-10932-1.
- Mullett, Michael A. (2004). Martin Luther. London: Routledge. ISBN 978-0-415-26168-5.
- Oberman, Heiko (2006). Luther: Man Between God and the Devil. New Haven: Yale University Press. ISBN 0-300-10313-1.
- Schaff, Philip (1910) [1888]. History of the Christian Church. Vol. VII. Modern Christianity & The German Reformation. New York: Charles Scribner's Sons – via Christian Classics Ethereal Library.
- Schaff, Philip (1910a) [1892]. History of the Christian Church. Vol. VII. Modern Christianity & The Swiss Reformation. New York: Charles Scribner's Sons – via Christian Classics Ethereal Library.
- Spitz, Lewis W. (1987). The Renaissance and Reformation Movements. St. Louis: Concordia Publishing House.
- Wilson, Derek (2007). Out of the Storm: The Life and Legacy of Martin Luther. London: Hutchinson. ISBN 978-0-09-180001-7.
