= Reformation Day =

Protestant religious holiday

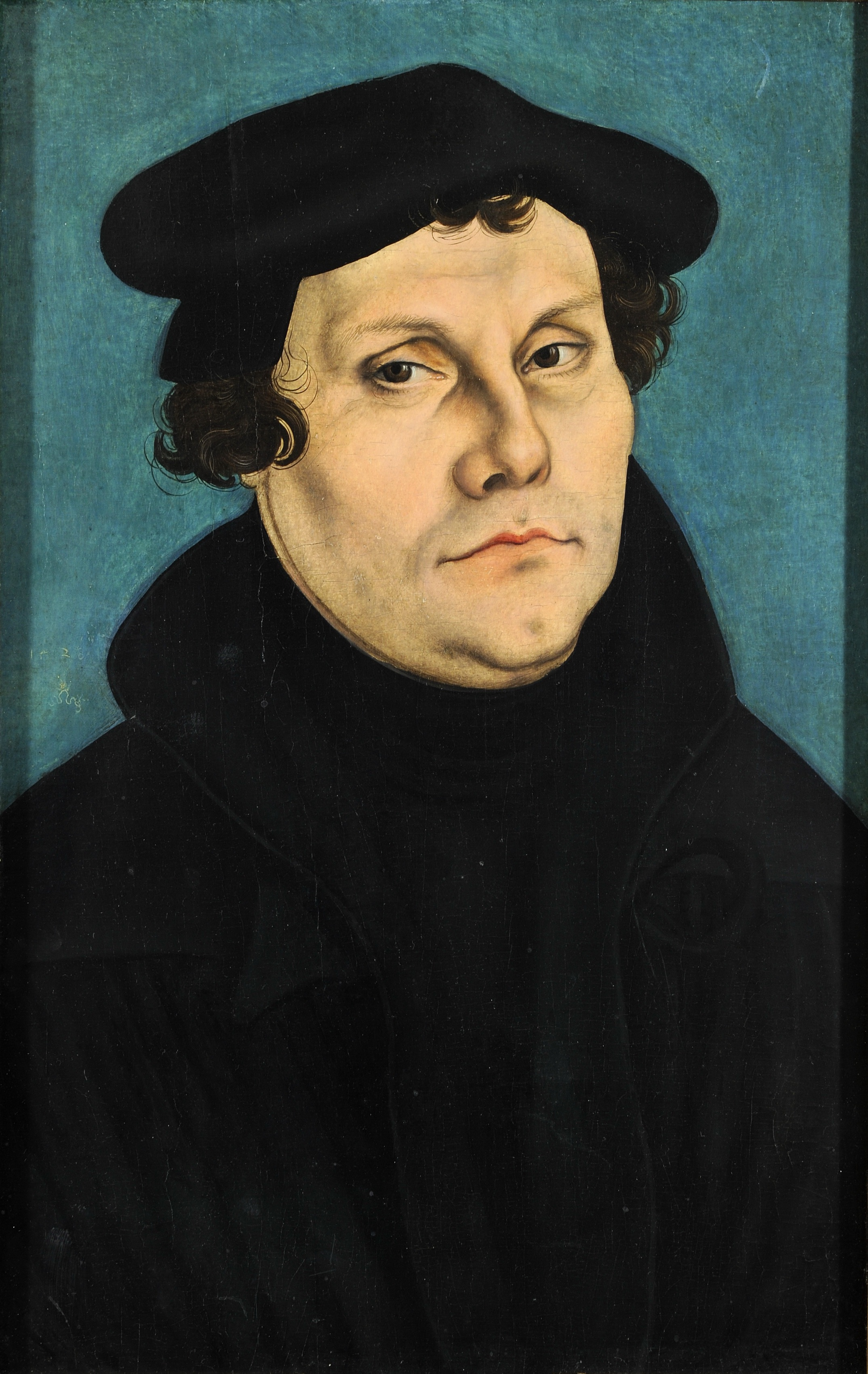
- Painting of Martin Luther by Lucas Cranach the Elder
- Observed by: Protestant communities
- Date: 31 October
- Next time: 31 October 2027
- Frequency: Annual

Reformation Day is a Protestant Christian religious holiday celebrated on 31 October in remembrance of the onset of the Reformation.

According to Philip Melanchthon, 31 October 1517 was the day Martin Luther nailed his Ninety-five Theses on the door of the All Saints' Church in Wittenberg, Electorate of Saxony, in the Holy Roman Empire. Historians and other experts on the subject argue that Luther may have chosen All Hallows' Eve on purpose to get the attention of common people, although that has never been proven. Available data suggest that 31 October was the day when Luther sent his work to Albert of Brandenburg, the Archbishop of Mainz. This has been verified; it is now regarded as the start of the Reformation alongside the unconfirmed (Melanchthon appears to be the only source for that) nailing of the Ninety-five Theses/grievances to All Saints' Church's door on the same date.

The holiday is significant for the Lutheran and Reformed Churches, although other Protestant communities also tend to commemorate the day. The Roman Catholic Church recognized it only recently, and often sends its official representatives in ecumenical spirit to various commemoration events held by Protestants. It is lawfully and officially recognized in some states of Germany and sovereign countries of Slovenia and Chile. In addition, countries like Switzerland and Austria provide specifics in laws pertaining to Protestant churches, while not officially proclaiming it a nationwide holiday.

== History ==
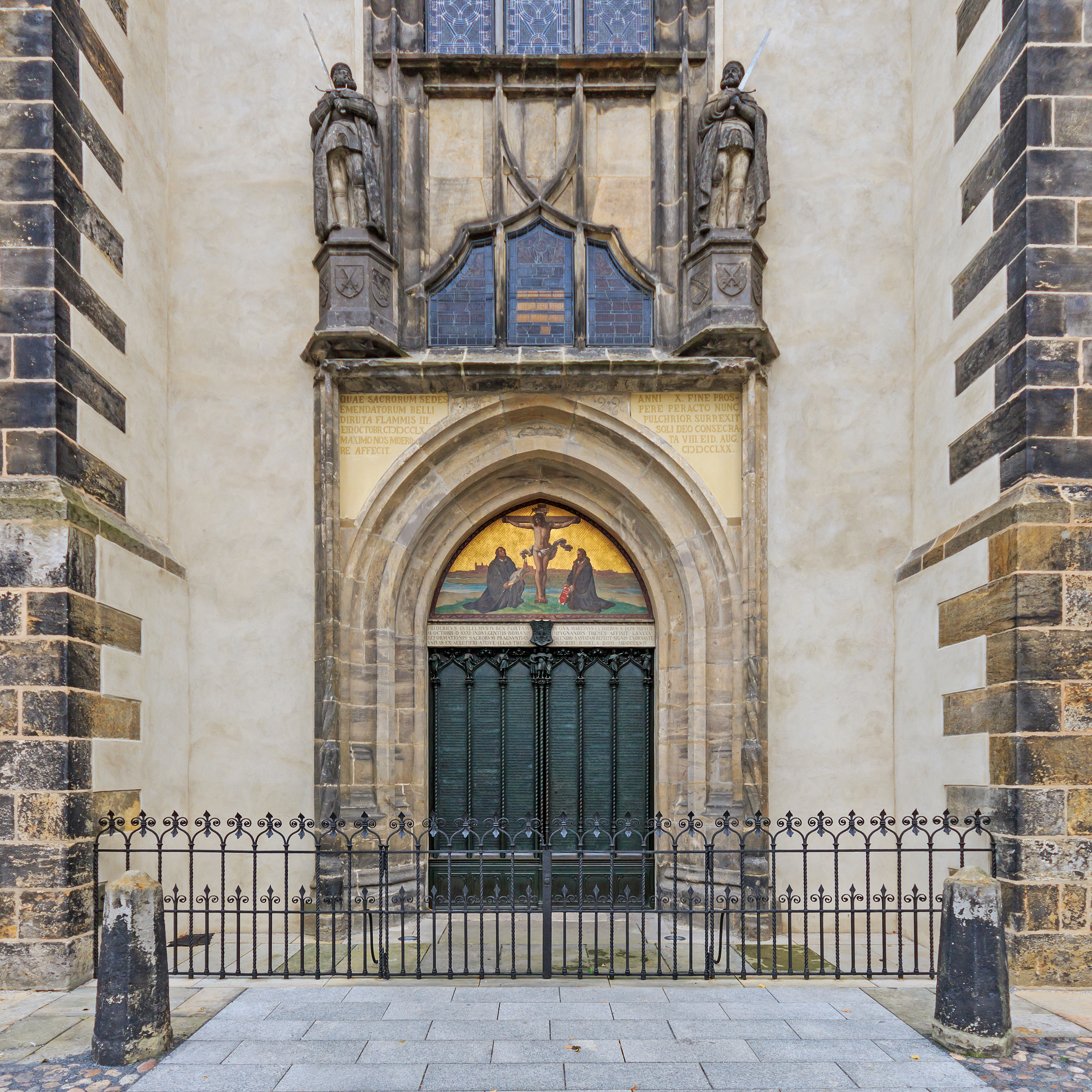
Door of the Schlosskirche (castle church) in Wittenberg to which Luther is said to have nailed his Ninety-five Theses on 31 October 1517, sparking the Reformation

In 1516–1517, Johann Tetzel, a Dominican friar and papal commissioner for indulgences, was sent to Germany to raise money to rebuild St Peter's Basilica in Rome.

On 31 October 1517, Martin Luther wrote to Albrecht, Archbishop of Mainz and Magdeburg, protesting against the sale of indulgences. He enclosed in his letter a copy of his "Disputation of Martin Luther on the Power and Efficacy of Indulgences", which came to be known as the Ninety-five Theses. Hans Hillerbrand writes that Luther had no intention of confronting the church, but saw his disputation as a scholarly objection to church practices, and the tone of the writing is accordingly "searching, rather than doctrinaire". Hillerbrand writes that there is nevertheless an undercurrent of challenge in several of the theses, particularly in Thesis 86, which asks: "Why does the pope, whose wealth today is greater than the wealth of the richest Crassus, build the basilica of St. Peter with the money of poor believers rather than with his own money?"

Luther objected to a saying attributed to Johann Tetzel that "As soon as the coin in the coffer rings, the soul from purgatory [also attested as 'into heaven'] springs." He insisted that, since forgiveness was God's alone to grant, those who claimed that indulgences absolved buyers from all punishments and granted them salvation were in error. Christians, he said, must not slacken in following Christ on account of such false assurances.

The sale of indulgences shown in A Question to a Mintmaker, woodcut by Jörg Breu the Elder of Augsburg, c. 1530

According to Philipp Melanchthon, writing in 1546, Luther "wrote theses on indulgences and posted them on the church of All Saints on 31 October 1517", an event now seen as sparking the Reformation. Some scholars have questioned Melanchthon's account, since he did not move to Wittenberg until a year later and no contemporaneous evidence exists for Luther's posting of the theses. Others counter that such evidence is unnecessary because it was the custom at Wittenberg university to advertise a disputation by posting theses on the door of All Saints' Church, also known as "Castle Church".

The Ninety-five Theses were quickly translated from Latin into German, printed, and widely copied, making the controversy one of the first in history to be aided by the printing press. Within two weeks, copies of the theses had spread throughout Germany; within two months throughout Europe.

Luther's writings circulated widely, reaching France, England, and Italy as early as 1519. Students thronged to Wittenberg to hear Luther speak. He published a short commentary on Galatians and his Work on the Psalms. This early part of Luther's career was one of his most creative and productive. Three of his best-known works were published in 1520: To the Christian Nobility of the German Nation, On the Babylonian Captivity of the Church, and On the Freedom of a Christian.

The parish order for the New Church in Regensburg states that the Reformation of the city is to be observed the first Sunday after 15 October, every year. This document may be from 1567, however the dating is uncertain. The 1569 church order in Pomerania states that the Reformation was to be observed on St. Martin's Day, which falls on 11 November. The hundredth anniversary of the Reformation, celebrated throughout the Protestant areas of Germany, was observed from 31 October to 1 November 1617, but a standard annual observance began much later, sometime after the two hundredth anniversary commemoration in 1717. The first annual observance was instituted by John George II, Elector of Saxony in his domains in 1667.

== Significance ==
It is celebrated among various Protestants, especially by Lutheran and Reformed Churches. Due to ecumenical movements, some other Christian groups now tend to acknowledge or co-participate in church services celebrating Reformation Day. That includes the Roman Catholic Church, as well as various Protestant denominations that are neither Lutheran or Reformed, i.e. those that lack a direct connection to religious events of the 16th century Europe.

In the United States, churches often transfer the holiday, so that it falls on the Sunday (called Reformation Sunday) on or before 31 October, with All Saints' Day moved to the Sunday on or after 1 November.

In Northern Ireland, Reformation Day parades are held by the Orange Order. The Belfast Orange districts, alongside marching bands, march from their district to meet at St Anne's Cathedral for a church service.

== Roman Catholic attitudes ==
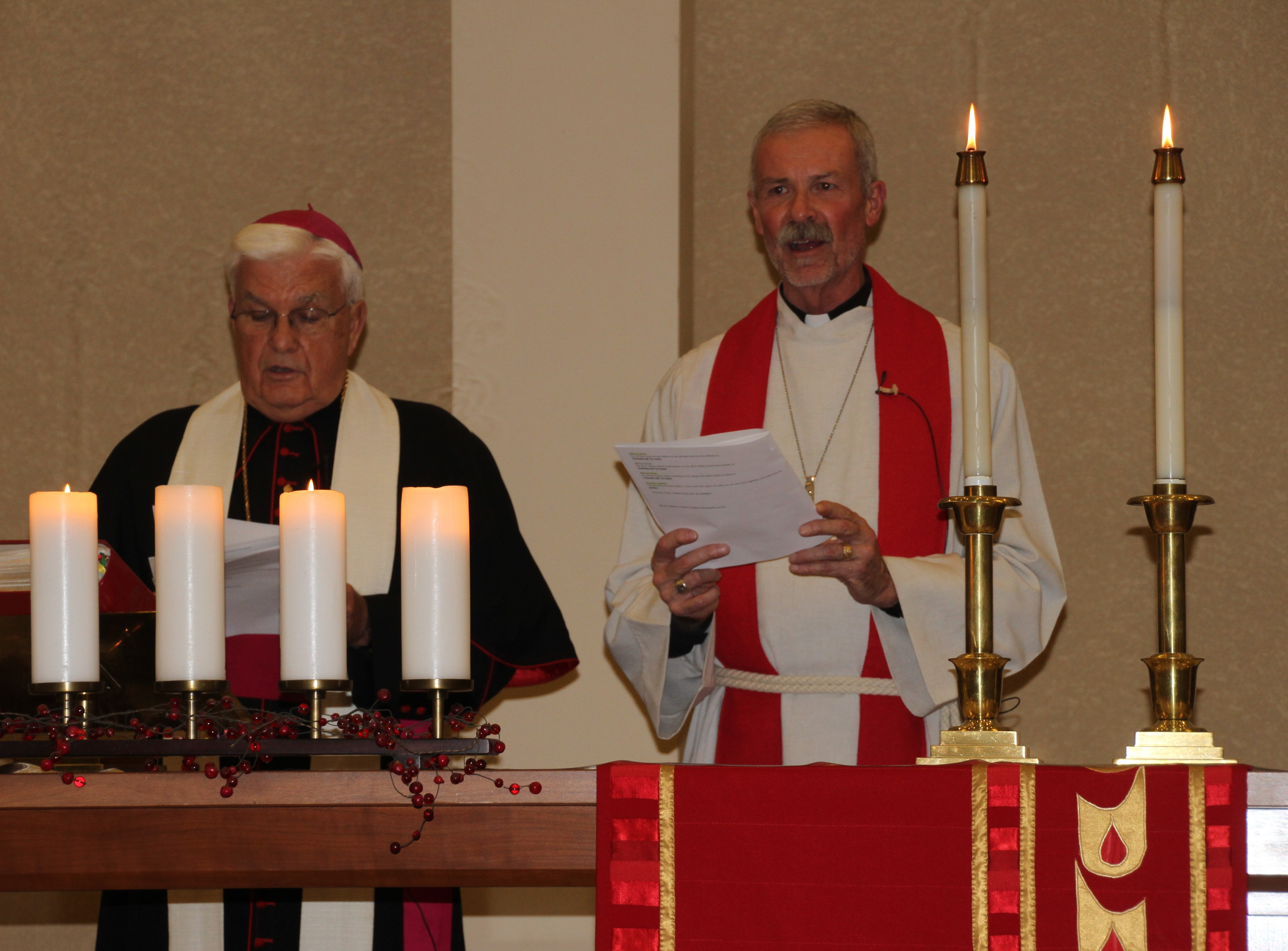
Bishop John M. Quinn (left) of the Roman Catholic Diocese of Winona and Bishop Steven Delzer of Evangelical Lutheran Southeastern Minnesota Synod leading a Reformation Day service in 2017

On 31 October 1999, the Lutheran World Federation and the Pontifical Council for Promoting Christian Unity signed the Joint Declaration on the Doctrine of Justification, regarding a resolution on some points of doctrinal disagreement between mainline Lutheran Churches and the Catholic Church (See also Criticism of Protestantism). The World Methodist Council formally recognized the Declaration in 2006.

In 2013, the Joint International Commission between representatives of the Lutheran World Federation and the Catholic Church published a report entitled From Conflict to Communion, anticipating the forthcoming Lutheran-Catholic Common Commemoration of the Reformation in 2017, which noted that "in 2017, Lutheran and Catholic Christians will commemorate together the 500th anniversary of the beginning of the Reformation". The "common commemoration" was a year-long remembrance concluded on Reformation Day 2017.

== Anniversaries ==
Ten years after the indulgences have
been destroyed; in memory of this we
both drink and are comforted at this hour.

— Martin Luther to Nikolaus von Amsdorf
on 1 November 1527

In Germany, with wars related to the Reformation reaching into 1648, and continued Catholic–Protestant animosity all over Europe well into the early 20th century, most of the following Reformation anniversaries were tainted by a degree of anti-Catholicism and nationalism. In 1617, the celebration of faith concentrated on Lutheran orthodoxy, while in 1717, the event was more focused on the liberation from the papal rule. Luther was celebrated as God's elected tool against the slavery of the new Roman Babylon. In 1817, the victory over Napoleon influenced the celebrations and led to the anniversary's national orientation: Luther became the German hero and the ideal role model for the bourgeoisie; he was depicted time and again in festive parades and popular prints. The "German Luther" also drew wide attention in 1917 during the First World War when nationalist themes were still recurring; at the same time, serious research of Luther's theology gained increasing importance.

When the Lutheran areas of West Germany celebrated the Reformation anniversary in 1967, 450 years after the posting of the theses, the event took place during an "ice age" in the relationship between the state and the Church in East Germany. This became clear through the attempt to secularise the Reformation with the concept of the "early bourgeois revolution" and through the pointed marginalisation of events organised by the Church, for example by means of holding celebrations of the October Revolution at exactly the same time. In the Federal Republic of Germany, there were only local celebrations organised by the churches of the respective states. A central church event in Wittenberg on 31 October 1967 was held in order to keep up at least a pretence of an all-German Evangelical Church.

=== 50th anniversary ===
According to some sources, Reformation Day has been commemorated since 1567. Exact dates for the holiday varied until after the two hundredth celebration in 1717 when 31 October became the official date of celebration in Germany and later expanded internationally.

=== Centenary ===
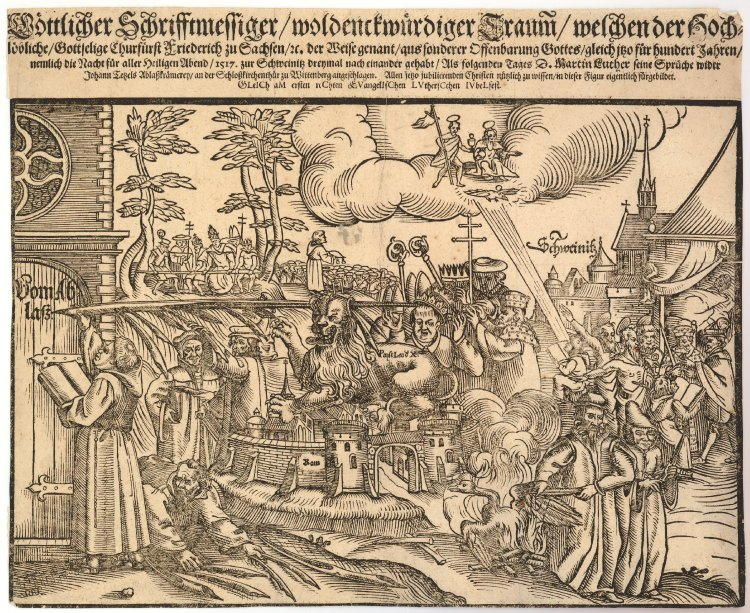
Print made for the 1617 Reformation Jubilee showing Luther enscribing the Theses on the Wittenberg church door with a giant quill

In 1617, the celebration of faith concentrated on Lutheran orthodoxy. In early 1617, the Lutheran duke and elector John George I of Saxony received a politically delicate dispatch. The University of Wittenberg asked for permission to celebrate the memory of its former lecturer Martin Luther. The duke agreed and made the commemoration obligatory for all of Electoral Saxony. The worship services and sermons were, however, all prewritten and prescribed in detail and provided as a recommendation to other Protestant regional rulers as well. They did not want any trouble with the Catholics.

=== 150th anniversary ===
In 1667, John George II, Elector of Saxony made it an official holiday for the first time in his domains. After celebrations in 1717 and 1817, it became more and more popular across Europe.

=== 200th anniversary ===
After the Thirty Years' War ended in 1648, it made an impact with observations in 1717 being largely anti-Catholic.

=== 300th anniversary ===
The 1817 anniversary was largely nationalist in outlook, being impacted by some of the most important events in human history: the French Revolution, the Napoleonic Wars, and political and territorial rearranging of Europe with the Congress of Vienna.

=== 400th anniversary ===
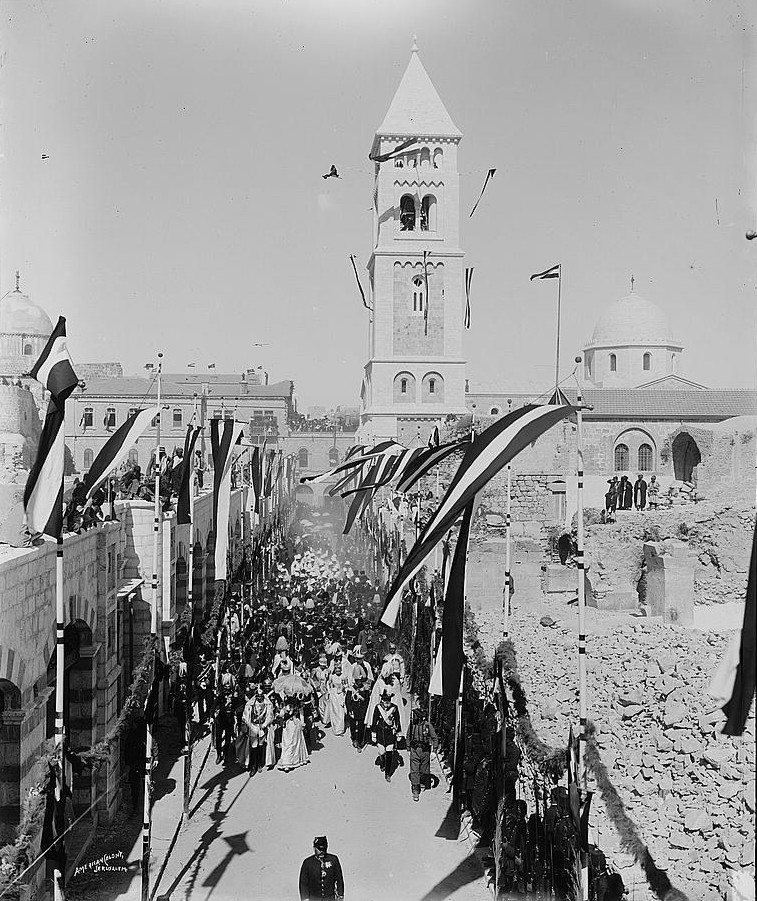
Emperor Wilhelm II, who was the Supreme Governor of the Evangelical Church of Prussia's older Provinces, and Empress Augusta Victoria after the inauguration of the Evangelical Church of the Redeemer in Jerusalem (Reformation Day, 31 October 1898)

The 1917 anniversary was held amidst the First World War. The theme of "German Luther" was rather muted, marked by Germanophobia throughout the Anglo-Saxon world. In Germany, the anniversary was celebrated with nationalist elements.

=== 499th anniversary ===
On Reformation Day in 2016, Pope Francis of the Catholic Church travelled to Sweden (where the Lutheran Church is the national Church) to commemorate the Reformation at Lund Cathedral, which serves as the seat for the Lutheran Bishop of Lund. An official press release from the Holy See stated:

The Lutheran World Federation (LWF) and Roman Catholic Church joint event will highlight the 50 years of continuous ecumenical dialogue between Catholics and Lutherans and the joint gifts of this collaboration. The Catholic-Lutheran commemoration of 499 years of the Reformation is structured around the themes of thanksgiving, repentance and commitment to common witness. The aim is to express the gifts of the Reformation and ask forgiveness for division perpetuated by Christians from the two traditions.

An ecumenical service was presided over by Bishop Munib Younan, President of the Lutheran World Federation; Martin Junge, General Secretary of the Lutheran World Federation; and Pope Francis, Leader of the Catholic Church. Representatives from the Anglican Communion, Baptist World Alliance, Eastern Orthodox Church, and Salvation Army also participated in the predominantly Lutheran and Roman Catholic event. Pope Francis, in a joint statement with Bishop Munib Younan, stated that "With gratitude we acknowledge that the Reformation helped give a greater centrality to sacred Scripture in the Church's life".

=== 500th anniversary ===
Luther set a stone in motion that was
unstoppable and changed the world forever.

— Angela Merkel, Chancellor of Germany
in Wittenberg on 31 October 2017

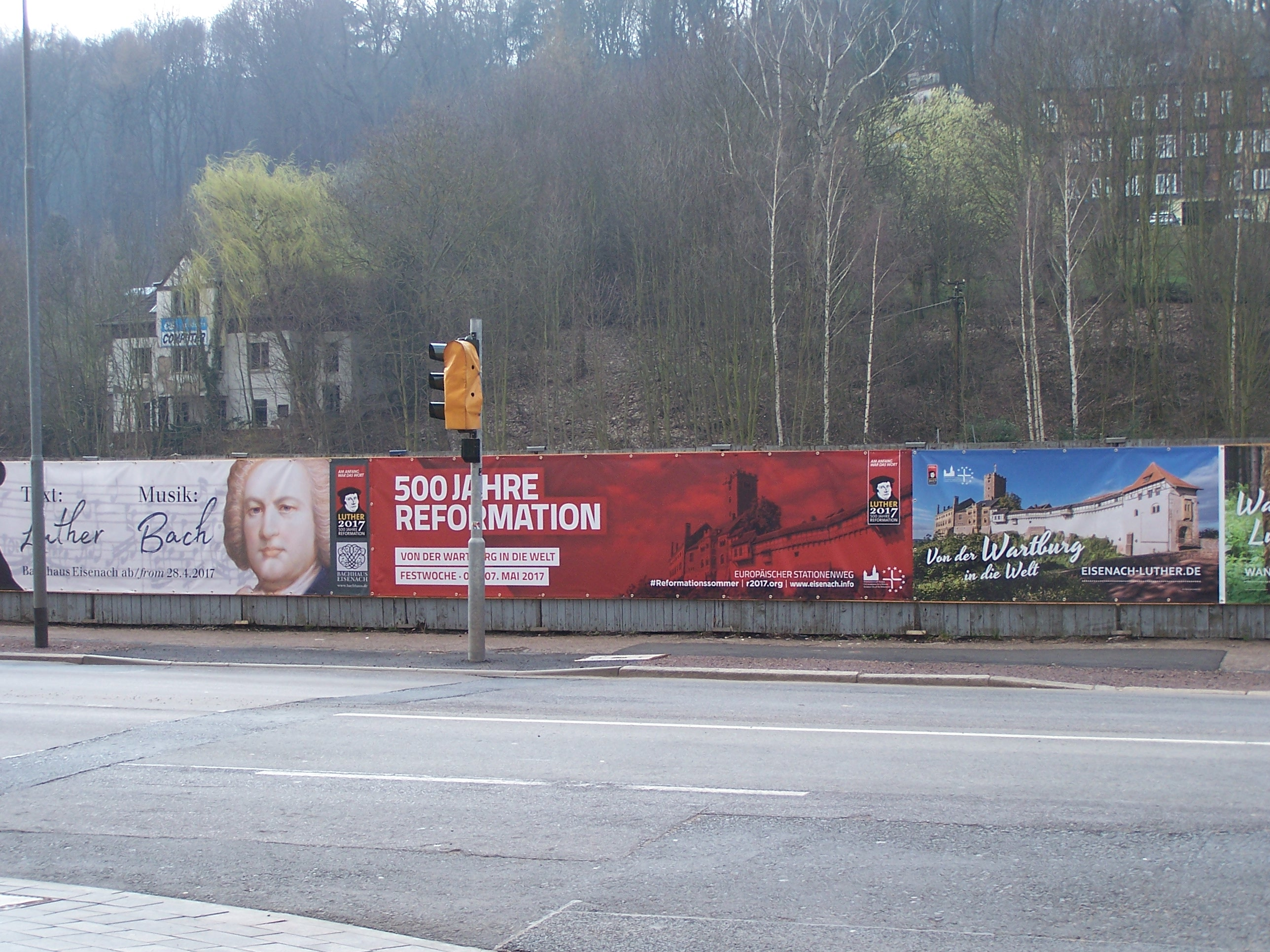
Street advertising for 500 years of Reformation in Eisenach, Thuringia

31 October 2017 was an official holiday in all of Germany. As a legal basis, German states which usually do not celebrate Reformation Day annually passed legislation or made regulations. These states are Baden-Württemberg, Bavaria, Berlin, Bremen, Hamburg, Hesse, Lower Saxony, North Rhine-Westphalia, Rhineland-Palatinate, Saarland, and Schleswig-Holstein.

In the United States, the Evangelical Lutheran Church in America hosted an event to commemorate the Reformation in the Washington National Cathedral in Washington, D.C., on Sunday, 29 October. The Wisconsin Evangelical Lutheran Synod had various special Reformation services in their various districts to celebrate the 500th anniversary of the Reformation.

In Germany, representatives from Lower Saxony, Schleswig-Holstein, Hamburg, and Bremen concluded a decision had to be made by state parliaments on whether to make Reformation Day a permanent official holiday in these respective states. The bill was passed by Schleswig-Holstein Parliament on 22 February 2018. It was then followed by Hamburg Parliament on 28 February, Lower Saxony Parliament on 19 June, and Bremen Parliament on 20 June, all within the same year.

In 2017, the press of the Vatican released a stamp to commemorate the 500th anniversary of the Reformation; the stamp depicts Luther and Melanchton kneeling before a crucified Jesus.

The anniversary prompted historians to reflect on the memory, meanings and influence of the Reformation over five centuries.

== Legal status ==
It is a civic holiday in the German states of Brandenburg, Hamburg, Bremen, Lower Saxony, Mecklenburg-Vorpommern, Saxony, Saxony-Anhalt, Schleswig-Holstein and Thuringia. Slovenia celebrates it as well due to the profound contribution of the Reformation to that nation's cultural development, although Slovenes are mainly Roman Catholics. With the increasing influence of Protestantism in Latin America (particularly newer groups such as various Evangelical Protestants, Pentecostals or Charismatics), it has been declared a national holiday in Chile in 2009, and in Peru in 2017.

== Lutheran church ==
"I saw another angel fly in the midst of heaven, having the everlasting gospel to preach" (Revelation 14:6). This passage is interpreted by some Lutherans as referring to Luther.

Within the Lutheran church, Reformation Day is considered a lesser festival, and is officially referred to as The Festival of the Reformation. Until the 20th century, most Lutheran churches celebrated Reformation Day on 31 October, regardless of which day of the week it occurred. Today, most Lutheran churches transfer the festival, so that it falls on the Sunday (called Reformation Sunday) on or before 31 October and transfer All Saints' Day to the Sunday on or after 1 November.

Reformation Day (Reformationsfest) was celebrated in Leipzig in Johann Sebastian Bach's time with a service, for which he composed church cantatas, including Gott der Herr ist Sonn und Schild, BWV 79 and Ein feste Burg ist unser Gott, BWV 80.

== Reformed church ==
Although not shaped by Luther's doctrine, Calvinist churches throughout the world do not regard the Reformation Day as less important, and celebrate it in a similar manner to Lutherans. The nailing of the Ninety-five Theses sparked the discussion about Catholic beliefs and practices of the day. Reformed theology first emerged in 1516 with Huldrych Zwingli in Switzerland who decided to participate in this European-wide discussion after seeing Luther's postulates; all this would not have happened without the events of 31 October 1517. Zwingli’s reform movement in Zürich emphasized a return to scriptural authority and rejected the use of images in worship, laying the groundwork for iconoclastic movements within Reformed communities. French theologian and former lawyer John Calvin entered the Reformation debate in 1536 with the first edition of his Institutes of the Christian Religion, which he continued to revise throughout his life.

== Other Protestant churches ==
Other Protestant denominations differ in their celebration of this holiday, ranging from the Lutheran and Reformed way of honoring the events, to a complete lack of observance. In recent decades, several Protestant churches have used Reformation Day as an occasion for ecumenical services with Catholic and Orthodox communities, emphasizing dialogue and reconciliation rather than division.

In 2016, Anglicans from the Diocese of Chile of the Anglican Church of South America participated in the March for Jesus on Reformation Day as a celebration of their Protestant heritage. Many Anglican / Episcopal churches hold Reformation Day services in observance of the holiday.

The United Methodist Church offers a theological reason for its observance of Reformation Day, stating that:

Our roots are deep in the Anglican tradition: Both John and Charles Wesley were priests in the Church of England. There are a number of reasons we should observe the day. The themes of the Reformation remain the great themes and principles of our own faith today. The great schism that occurred in the church remains with us. Our fractured denominations have entered into dialogue and cooperative activities that have brought us closer together. Today we may observe Reformation Day with a sense of moving toward unity and community. It is an opportunity to repent of the sins and excesses of the past and to celebrate our common faith, even if we still cannot celebrate a common ritual and sacrament. Reformation today can represent healing of old wounds as, together, we all work to build and strengthen Christ's church and love one another as Christ has loved us.

Alongside Reformation Day, many Protestant Churches observe All Hallows' Eve on 31 October, the vigil of All Saints' Day.

== See also ==
- Buß- und Bettag, a unique Protestant holiday observed in Saxony and, to some degree, also in Bavaria
