= Lutherhaus Eisenach =

Coordinates: 50°58′23″N 10°19′12″E

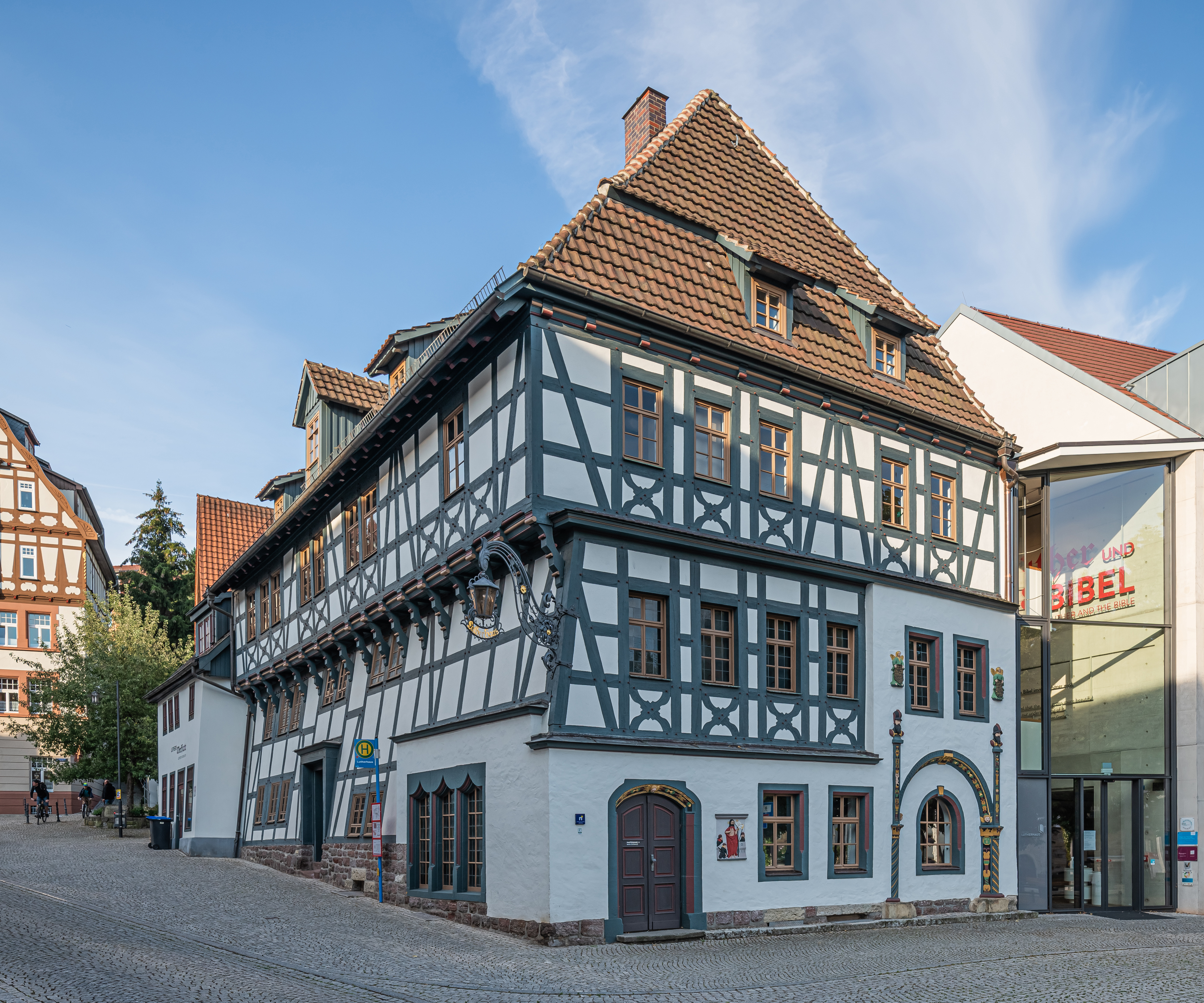
Lutherhaus Eisenach, 2020

Lutherhaus Eisenach, Thuringia

Lutherhaus Eisenach is one of the oldest surviving half-timbered houses in Thuringia. Tradition holds that Martin Luther lived there with the Cotta family during his schooldays in Eisenach from 1498 to 1501. The Lutherhaus has been one of the most important historic Reformation sites since the 19th century and, as such, was designated a "European cultural heritage site" in 2011. The Lutherhaus has been run as a cultural history museum since 1956.

== Luther's history in Eisenach ==
Martin Luther resided in his "beloved town" of Eisenach several times in his life. He spent three years of his schooldays there and translated the New Testament in Wartburg Castle.

=== As a schoolboy (1498 to 1501) ===
Son of Hans (1459–1530) and Margarethe Luder, née Lindemann (1459–1531), Martin Luther was born on November 10, 1483, in the Central German city of Eisleben. Luther attended the Latin school in the neighboring city of Mansfeld, before moving to Magdeburg where he attended the cathedral school for one year in 1497. The next year, Luther moved to Eisenach, where he initially lived with family relatives in his mother's hometown. Since he still had to earn something for his keep, he went from house to house as a choirboy – quite common for school students in that day. Luther's first biographer, Johann Mathesius, recounts that the young woman Ursula Cotta was so pleased by the schoolboy's singing that she took him into her home. She was the wife of city councilman Conrad (Cunz) Cotta and a daughter of Heinrich Schalbe. Her father was one of the most influential residents of Eisenach in his day. At that time, the Cottas also had extensive influence and property in Eisenach. Since they owned several houses in the city, including the present-day Lutherhaus, in the early 16th century, it is highly probable that Luther found room and board there for a while.

In addition what he learned at St. George's parochial school, above all, his spiritual growth during his days in Eisenach was especially influenced by the Collegium schalbense. This circle of pious laity around Heinrich Schalbe had close ties to the Franciscans and was shaped by their piety. Luther also attended meetings at the home of the diocesan priest Johannes Braun, where those gathered made music, prayed, and discussed religious as well as humanist books. Luther departed Eisenach in early 1501 in order to attend the university in Erfurt. He always remembered his schooldays "ynn meiner lieben Stad" (in my beloved town) fondly and remained in contact with several residents of Eisenach all his life.

=== In Wartburg Castle (May 1521 to March 1522) ===
The newly elected Holy Roman Emperor Karl V summoned Luther before the Imperial Diet in Worms in March 1521 because of his Reformation writings. Luther was called upon to recant his writings on April 17, 1521, but, after being given a day to consider, he refused. Luther departed from Worms on April 26 and headed back to Wittenberg. On May 4, armed horsemen forced his escorts and him to stop near Altenstein Palace in the Thuringian Forest. They "abducted" Luther, who had foreknowledge of the plan, and brought him to Wartburg Castle above Eisenach. He was in fact being hidden for his own safety since he was the endangered by the imperial ban as a result of his refusal to recant in Worms. The Edict of Worms issued a short time later not only placed Luther under the ban and declared him a heretic but also officially forbade the printing and dissemination of his writings.

Luther, who had assumed the alias "Junker Jörg" in allusion to St. George, patron saint of the city of Eisenach and Mansfeld, used the period of solitude and seclusion in Wartburg Castle to study the New Testament texts of the Bible intensively. When he was ambushed near Altenstein, he had quickly grabbed the Hebrew Bible and the Greek New Testament. Luther initially used them to continue his exegesis of individual Bible passages before beginning his epochal labor: From mid-December 1521 onward, he translated the entire New Testament from the Greek into "German" in just eleven weeks. Since there was no standard German language in his day, Luther used the language of the Saxon chancellery for his translation, which was relative widespread through its use in diplomatic correspondence. Unlike his predecessors, Luther did not translate the Bible on the basis of the Latin Vulgate. Instead, he took the original Greek text as his starting point and only consulted the Vulgate as a supplement. This enabled him to free himself from the characteristic Latin style and create a readable but nevertheless elegant Bible text. Unable to find any exact German equivalents for many biblical terms, Luther created numerous new words and idiomatic expressions while translating the Bible.

Luther had the finished translation manuscript in his baggage when he returned to Wittenberg in early March 1522 to confront the unrest that had broken out there. He revised the manuscript thoroughly together with Philipp Melanchthon, professor of Greek in Wittenberg and simultaneously one of Luther's confidants, before delivering it to Melchior Lotter the Younger for printing in the summer. The first edition of the so-called September Testament was published on September 20, 1522. Luther had already turned to translating the Old Testament in the meantime. Luther needed until 1534 before he was able to present a complete translation of the Bible with the collaboration of numerous experts.

== Architectural history ==
The architectural history of the historic building was extensively studied and documented prior to the restoration and renovation of the Lutherhaus (2013–2015). The dendrochronological tests performed at this time revealed that the smaller predecessor building dates to 1269. This makes the Lutherhaus in Eisenach one of the oldest-timbered houses in Thuringia. In 1356, the south domestic outbuilding was added onto substantially, thus expanding the Lutherhaus to its present architectural volume. The exact date when the Cotta family came into possession of the Lutherhaus, which initially consisted several individual buildings, is not documented. That the Cottas already owned the present-day Lutherhaus around 1500 is, however, certain.

In the early 1560s, Hans Leonhard, a Renaissance master builder in Eisenach, purchased the building, which was being used as a brewery at that time. Leonhard was long assumed to have created the magnificent Renaissance facade of the Lutherhaus as well, but recent architectural history research suggests that, although he created the Renaissance Portal, the facade was originally part of the adjacent electoral palace and was not added to Lutherhaus until after the demolition of the palace in 1742.

The date of the addition of the half-timbering is also disputed. Whereas older depictions of the Lutherhaus claim it had not been erected until after the conflagration of the city in 1636, current analyses suggest that the construction work had already been completed in the 16th century. The Lutherhaus changed owners frequently during the early modern period, who put it to different uses.

A restaurant, the so-called "Lutherkeller", was located in the building from 1898 onward. The proprietor, Adolf Lukass, decorated his establishment in "old German style" and, for a surcharge, also showed his guests the historic "Luther chambers" in which Luther supposedly lived as a student. The Lutherhaus had survived every war and city fire largely undamaged until World War II. A British blockbuster bomb exploded above Luther Square on November 23, 1944. The explosion damaged the building's north facade substantially. The southern part in which the Luther chambers and the half-timbered hall are located nevertheless remained intact. The damaged building was swiftly repaired after the end of the war.

== Museum history ==
=== The Lutherhaus from 1956 to 2013 ===
Once the house had been rebuilt, the Lukass family (Lucas, Lukass) resumed running the "Lutherkeller" restaurant until 1953. After part of the family had fled to West Germany, the Evangelical Lutheran Church in Thuringia rented space in the house in 1955. It expanded the existing historic Luther site further, housed the "Protestant Parsonage Archive" in it, and opened a site of remembrance in the Lutherhaus in 1956, which was a mixture of historic site, collection, and museum. In 1965, the Thuringian Regional Church received half of the house as a bequest from the wife of the late Mr. Lukass, Karoline Schneider, who had owned one half of the house until her death. The church acquired the other half from the Lukass family heirs in 1997. The Lutherhaus remained in the possession of the Thuringian Regional Church after reunification and was used as a historic Reformation site. The Wartburg Verlag GmbH ran the Lutherhaus from 2006 to 2013.

Despite repeated restoration and renovation (among other times, in 1976-77 and 1983), the house soon reached its architectural limits. The conditions proved to be inadequate for the storage of the Parsonage Archive's holdings, too. The permanent exhibition "Rediscovering Martin Luther", completely redesigned in 1996, was one of the last modernization projects. At that time it was state-of-the-art and served as the model for the modernization of the Lutherhaus in Wittenberg. All the same, the Lutherhaus grew less attractive and less modern than other historic Reformation sites over the years.

=== The New Lutherhaus (2013 to the present) ===
In the run-up to the anniversary of the Reformation in 2017, the Evangelical Church in Central Germany, created out of the merger of the Evangelical Lutheran Church in Thuringia and the Evangelical Church of the Church Province of Saxony in 2013, established the Stiftung Lutherhaus Eisenach in 2009 with the intention of establishing a modern museum that meets international museum standards. The Protestant Parsonage Archive's holdings, which had been property of the Verband evangelischer Pfarrerinnen and Pfarrer in Deutschland e.V. until then, were bestowed on the newly established foundation and have been the basis of the museum's collection since that time. The Lutherhaus was given its first full-time director and curator, Dr. Jochen Birkenmeier, who also designed the look and content of the redesigned museum and current permanent exhibition "Luther and the Bible".

The Lutherhaus was completely renovated and restored from 2013 to 2015. During this time, museum education work and management of the Lutherhaus relocated to the nearby Creutznach House. The new Lutherhaus was officially reopened on September 26, 2015, with a major festival worship service followed by a grand reopening party.

== Permanent exhibit "Luther and the Bible" ==
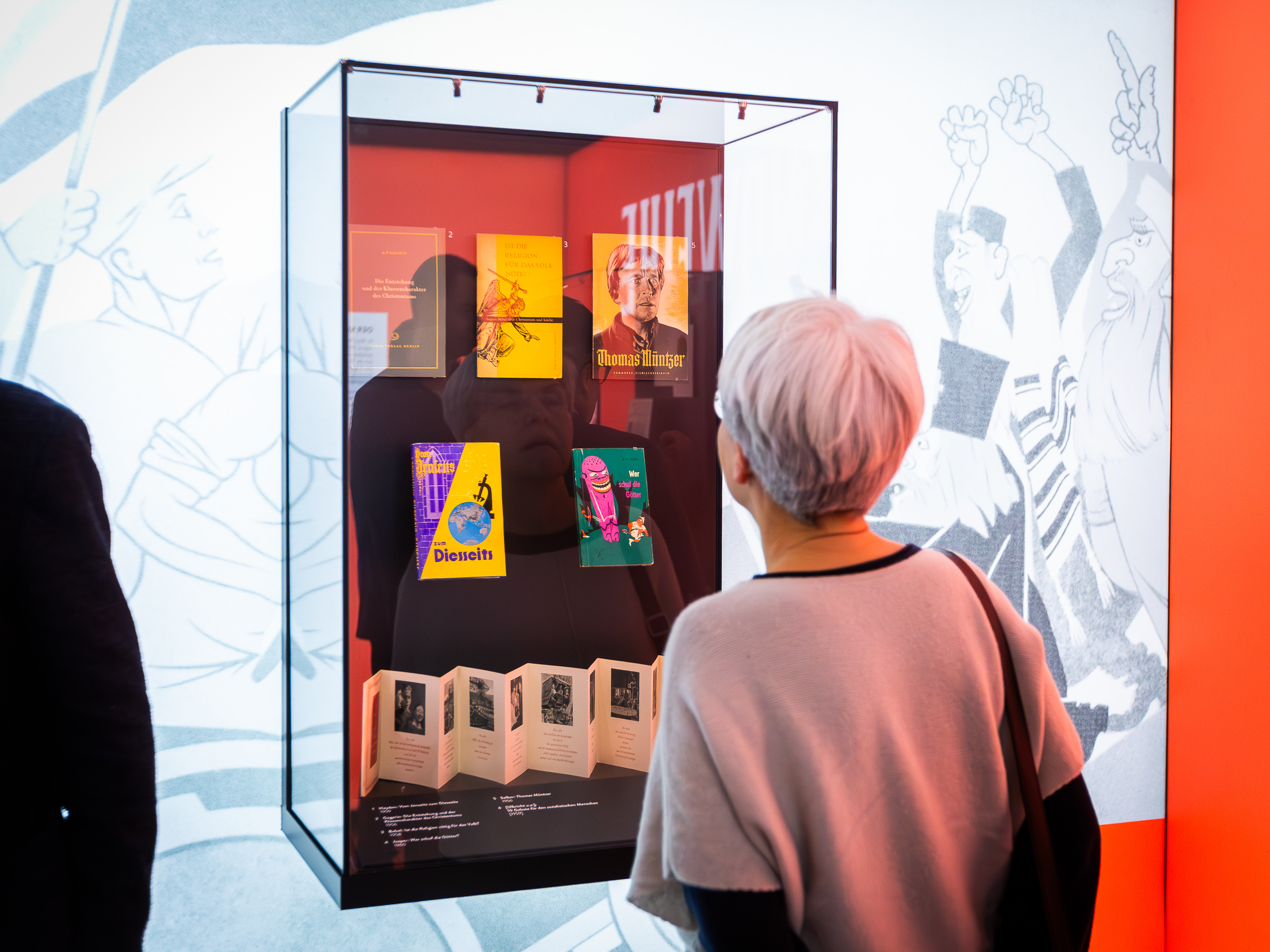
View of the capsule exhibition "Young People, God and FDJ" in the Lutherhaus Eisenach.

The house's interior and the exhibition were also being redesigned while the building was being renovated and remodeled. The permanent exhibition "Luther and the Bible", on display since 2015, explores Luther's historic translation of the Bible on three floors, presenting many historical treasures such as several paintings from the Cranach School, masterpieces from the Römhilder Textilschatz, and the parish register with the entry recording Johann Sebastian Bach’s baptism. Moreover, numerous other exhibited objects and modern media stations enable visitors to the museum to access exhibition themes interactively. Remodeling has made the Lutherhaus, including even the pergola in the courtyard, largely universally accessible for the first time in its history.

The permanent exhibition was revamped and expanded with new content in 2022 on the occasion of the 500th anniversary of Luther’s translation of the Bible. Three new multimedia stations interactively present the history of Luther’s best-known hymn, "A Mighty Fortress Is Our God", ideologically motivated alterations of the text of the Bible in the 18th to 21st century, and the Luther Bible’s international impact.

=== Ground floor ===
The exhibition begins on the ground floor and presents a look at Luther’s cultural world around 1500 and the forms of piety and religious practices he encountered. His schooldays in Eisenach are examined, as are his path to becoming a monk and the evolution of his Reformation beliefs.

=== Mezzanine floor ===
His translation of the Bible was one of Luther’s most important and influential achievements. The difficulties and challenges of translating are examined on the mezzanine floor of the Lutherhaus. The linguistic diversity of "German" is communicated engagingly and Luther's own statements about "interpreting" are also presented. At the same time, the role played by the numerous experts that collaborated with Luther on his translation of the Bible is revealed. The historical Luther chambers can also be toured on the mezzanine floor.

=== Top floor ===
Luther's death in 1546 ended neither the Reformation nor the effective history of his translation of the Bible. On the contrary, Luther's translation of the Bible has been shaping German language, literature and music to this day. This can be traced in many individual examples on the top floor. The founding of the Cansteinsche Bibelanstalt and the development of standing type were extremely important for the spread and enduring success of the Luther Bible because only these innovations made the Bible a mass-produced product that was disseminated throughout the entire world in the wake of the missionary movement inspired by Pietism. The permanent exhibition concludes with several media stations that show the influence of the Luther Bible on vernacular Bible translations throughout Europe, various interventions in the Bible, the significance of the (Luther) Bible today and the challenges of the current revision of the Luther Bible (Bible revision). Since 2025, the capsule exhibitions of the Lutherhaus have been shown in the last exhibition room.

== "Dejudaization Institute" ==
Since 2019, the Lutherhaus has a second major theme in addition to the history of the Reformation, the scholarly treatment and confrontation of the anti-Semitic “Dejudaization Institute”, which was active in Eisenach between 1939 and 1945. In March 2018, Lutherhaus-Director Jochen Birkenmeier launched the initiative to erect a “Dejudaization Institute” memorial, which was unveiled in Eisenach in a ceremony on May 6, 2019, eighty years after the founding of the institute. Since September 19, 2019, the Lutherhaus has been showing the special exhibition "Study and Eradication: The Church’s ‘Dejudaization Institute’, 1939–1945" (curated by Jochen Birkenmeier and Michael Weise), which is on permanent display at the Lutherhaus after being extended several times. It examines the institute's historico-political origins and intellectual roots, the impact of its work, and the arduous path to confronting its history after 1945. It also explores the institute staffers’ appropriation of Martin Luther and his anti-Jewish statements. A second “Nazi bell” decorated with a swastika was added to the special exhibition in the spring of 2022.

== Ai Weiwei: man in a cube ==
In 2019, the Stiftung Lutherhaus Eisenach succeeded in acquiring the sculpture man in a cube, which Ai Weiwei had created for the exhibition Luther and the Avant-Garde put on in Wittenberg during the 2017 quincentenary of the Reformation. In man in a cube, the Chinese artist worked through his experiences of anxiety and isolation following his arrest by Chinese authorities: “My work is physically a concrete block, which contains within it a single figure in solitude. That figure is the likeness of myself during my eighty-one days under secret detention in 2011.” Concentrating on ideas and language helped Ai Weiwei endure his imprisonment. He was also intrigued by the connectedness of freedom, language, and ideas in Martin Luther, to whom he explicitly paid tribute with man in a cube. It was erected in the courtyard of the Lutherhaus and presented to the public in a ceremony in October 2020 – 500 years after the publication of Martin Luther's treatise On the Freedom of a Christian (1520).

== Capsule exhibitions ==
Since 2025, the Lutherhaus shows changing impulse exhibitions with a contemporary historical focus in a new exhibition space designed for sustainability, which complement, expand and deepen the content of the permanent and special exhibitions. The exhibition Youth, God and FDJ. The fight against the churches in the early GDR, which opened on 31 January 2025, is the first of these.

== Special exhibits and events ==
Parallel to the renovation (2013–2015), a private residential and commercial building was built on the empty lot to the west of the Lutherhaus. A glass entrance hall connects it to the historic Lutherhaus. The Stiftung Lutherhaus Eisenach uses the ground floor of the new building as a reception area and museum shop. The new special exhibition gallery in which changing special exhibitions have been shown every year starting in 2016 is also located there. In addition, regular events, including the annual museum party on Luther's birthday (November 10), the KinderKulturNacht (Children's Culture Night), readings, concerts and lectures are held at the Lutherhaus.

== Museum education ==
In addition to the permanent exhibition, groups of visitors can also take advantage of different museum education courses at the Lutherhaus. These include "School in Luther’s Day" and different workshop courses on calligraphy and letterpress printing. Worksheets are also made available to school and confirmand groups. Special educational programs were developed for the special exhibition Study and Eradication. The Church’s “Dejudaization Institute”, 1939–1945 and Ai Weiwei's sculpture man in a cube, which make the respective subjects approachable.

== Collection and Protestant Parsonage Archive ==
The holdings of the Protestant Parsonage Archive (Evangelisches Pfarrhausarchiv) are the basis of the Lutherhaus's own museum collection. It was created in 1925 by Pastor August Angermann (1867–1947), who served in Merseburg. Angermann had announced at the clergy convention in Giessen one year earlier that he planned to assemble a collection on the history and significance of the Protestant parsonage. At the next clergy convention in Hamburg (1925), the Protestant clergy associations entrusted him with the job of putting his plan into action.

By 1931, the collection already consisted of over 1300 individual items (paintings, drawings, etchings, photos, books, letters, manuscripts, badges, coins, medals, family registers, etc.). It was opened to the public in three rooms of Wittenberg Castle on November 2, 1932.

The collection was closed during World War II. After the end of the war, it was originally supposed to be brought to Eisleben but no suitable facility could be found there. Instead, the holdings of the Protestant Parsonage Archive were brought to Eisenach in 1947 or 1948 at the urging of Dr. Moritz Mitzenheim, Bishop of the Regional Church of Thuringia. They were housed in Villa Hainstein until 1956. The holdings were brought from there to the Lutherhaus where they were presented to the public in a permanent exhibition that opened on May 1, 1956.

The content of the exhibition on the top floor of the Lutherhaus remained largely unchanged until 1995. The thoroughly revised and updated exhibition "A Trip through the History of the Protestant Parsonage" opened in 1996. Since both the space and the climate in the historic Lutherhaus proved to be increasingly problematic for the storage of the collection's holdings, a storage facility for the Protestant Parsonage Archive was added to the newly built Regional Church Archive in Eisenach in 2014, where the holdings are once again accessible to researchers.

== Accolades ==
The permanent exhibition at the Lutherhaus has received the 2016 ICONIC AWARD in the category “Architecture – Best of Best”, the “2016 Thuringian Tourism Award” (special award: “Digital Solutions Tourism”), and a Special 2016 Hessian-Thuringian Sparkassen Cultural Foundation Museum Award. In October 2017, the Museumsverband Thüringen awarded its Museum Seal to the Lutherhaus Eisenach. It recognizes museums that exemplarily meet the quality standards of the International Council of Museums (ICOM) and the Deutscher Museumsbundes (DMB). The Lutherhaus was also certified accessible (Barrierefreiheit geprüft) that same year. The Lutherhaus was nominated for the 2022 Thuringian Tourism Award in the category “Sustainability”.

== Literature ==
- Jochen Birkenmeier: Das/The Lutherhaus in Eisenach, Eisenach 2015.
- Ernst-Otto Braasch: Die Familie Schalbe in Eisenach, in: Amtsblatt der Evangelisch-Lutherischen Kirche in Thüringen 34 (1981) No. 10, p. 85–87.
- Hans-Joachim Döring, Michael Haspel (Eds.): Lothar Kreyssig und Walter Grundmann. Zwei kirchenpolitische Protagonisten des 20. Jahrhunderts in Mitteldeutschland, Weimar 2014.
- Scott H. Hendrix: Martin Luther. Visionary Reformer, New Haven / London 2015.
- Hagen Jäger: Luther House Eisenach, Regensburg 2004.
- Volkmar Joestel: Martin Luther. Rebel and Reformer. A Biographical Sketch. Engl. Transl. by Stephen P. Glinsky, 4th Edition, Wittenberg 2013.
- Hans Eberhard Matthes: Das Eisenacher Lutherhaus mit einem Anhang ‚Das Geschlecht Cotta‘, Eisenach 1939.
- Hans-Dieter Meister: Das Lutherhaus in Eisenach, (East) Berlin 1989.
- Willy Quandt: Martin Luther als Schüler in Eisenach and das Eisenacher Lutherhaus, (East) Berlin 1965.
