= Diet of Worms =

Imperial assembly of the Holy Roman Empire (1521)

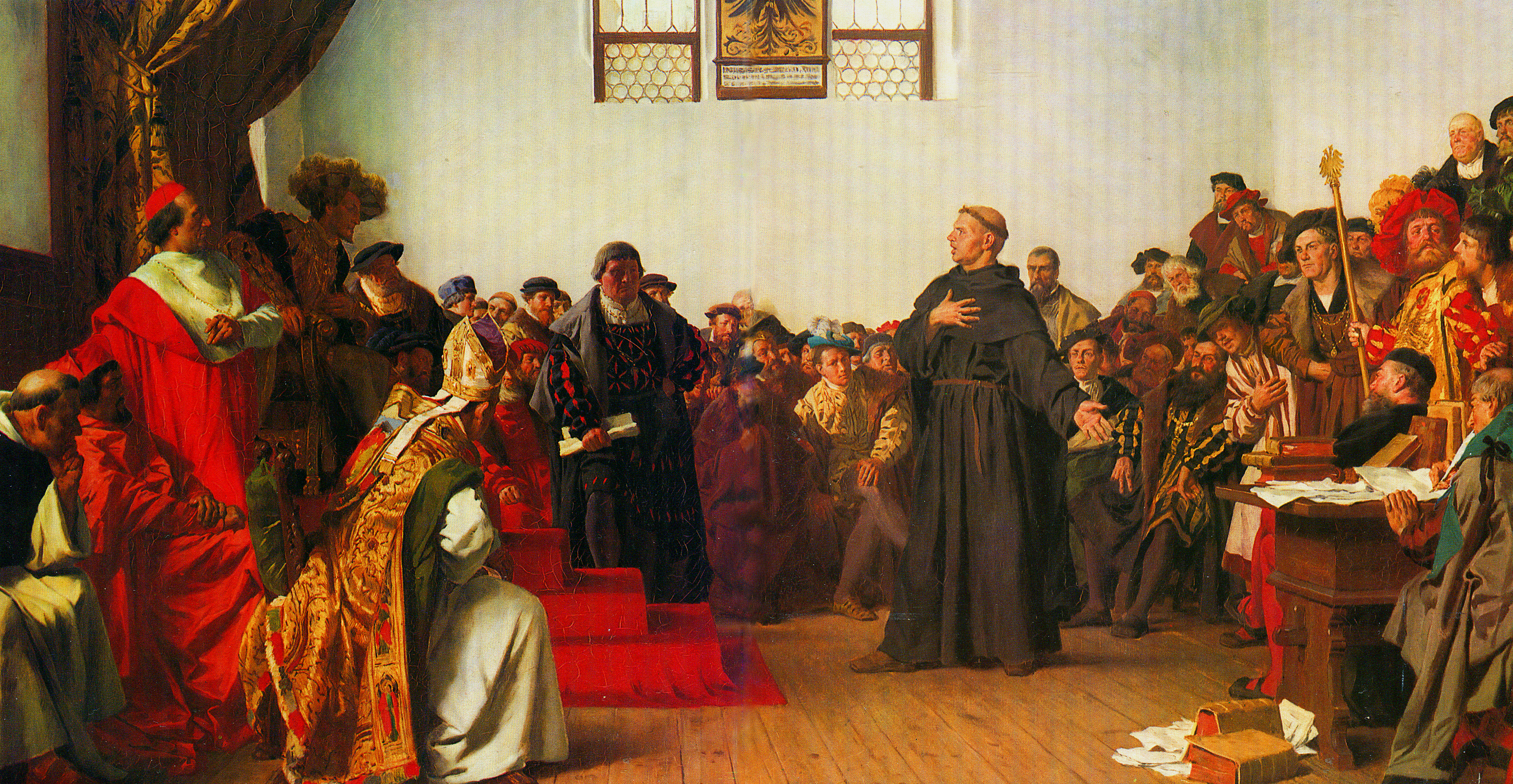
Luther at the Diet of Worms, an 1877 portrait depicting Martin Luther by Anton von Werner

The Diet of Worms of 1521 (German: Reichstag zu Worms [ˈʁaɪçstaːk tsuː ˈvɔʁms]) was an imperial diet (a formal deliberative assembly) of the Holy Roman Empire called by Emperor Charles V and conducted in the Imperial Free City of Worms. Martin Luther was summoned to the diet in order to renounce or reaffirm his views in response to a Papal bull of Pope Leo X. In answer to questioning, he defended the views that had been criticized and refused to recant them. At the end of the diet, the Emperor issued the Edict of Worms (Wormser Edikt), a decree which condemned Luther as "a notorious heretic" and banned citizens of the Empire from propagating his ideas. Although the Reformation is usually considered to have begun in 1517, this edict is the first overt schism associated with it.

The diet was conducted from 28 January to 25 May 1521 at the Bischofshof palace in Worms, with the Emperor presiding. Other imperial diets took place at Worms in the years 829, 926, 1076, 1122, 1495, and 1545, but unless plainly qualified, the term "Diet of Worms" usually refers to the assembly of 1521.

== Background ==
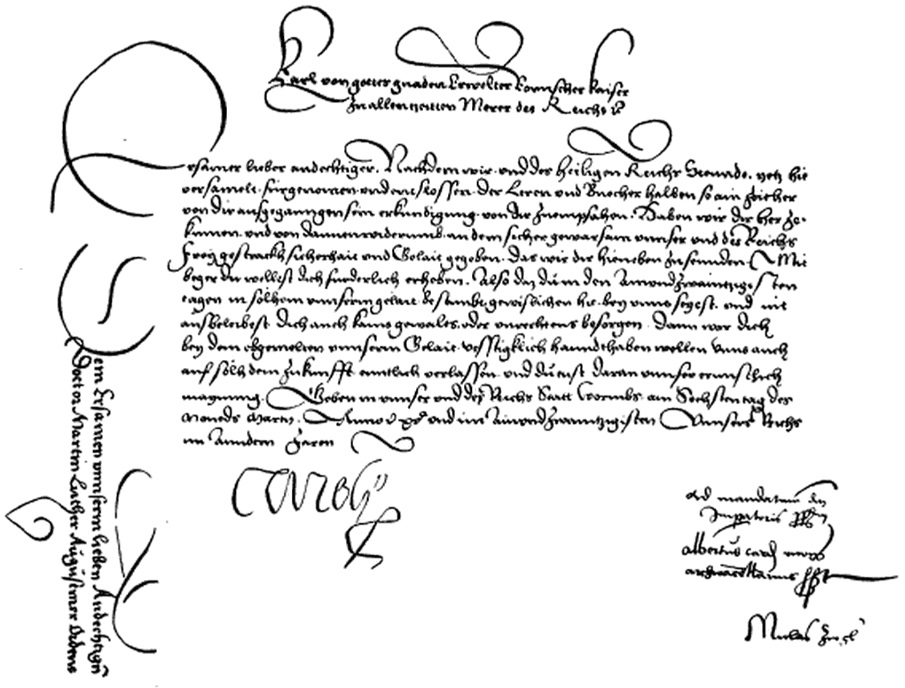
Summons for Luther to appear at the Diet of Worms signed by Emperor Charles V; the text on the left was on the reverse side.

In June 1520, Pope Leo X issued the Papal bull Exsurge Domine ("Arise, O Lord"), outlining 41 purported errors found in Martin Luther's Ninety-five Theses and other writings related to or written by him. Luther first attracted the attention of ecclesiastical authorities after the publication of his 95 Theses (written 1517) in 1518. Luther continued to preach, write, and publish his attacks on the Church, was excommunicated in January 1521, and told to appear before the assembly at the city of Worms. Luther was summoned by the emperor. Frederick III, Elector of Saxony obtained an agreement that, if Luther appeared, he would be promised safe passage to and from the meeting. This guarantee was essential after the treatment of Jan Hus, who was tried and executed at the Council of Constance in 1415 despite a promise of safe conduct.

Emperor Charles V commenced the Imperial Diet of Worms on 23 January 1521 where Luther was considered outlawed by the Catholic Church as all of his writings were condemned as heretical to the church. Luther was summoned to renounce or reaffirm his views. When he appeared before the assembly on 16 April, Johann von Eck, an assistant of the Archbishop of Trier (Richard von Greiffenklau zu Vollrads at that time), acted as spokesman for the emperor. Luther refused to recant and was charged as a "notorious heretic" and outlaw, making him a criminal.

== Martin Luther ==
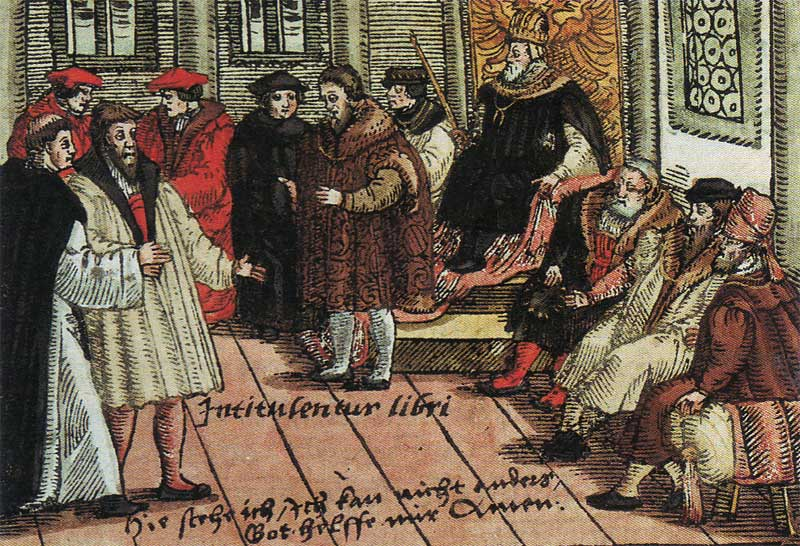
Luther in Worms, a 1577 tinted woodcut

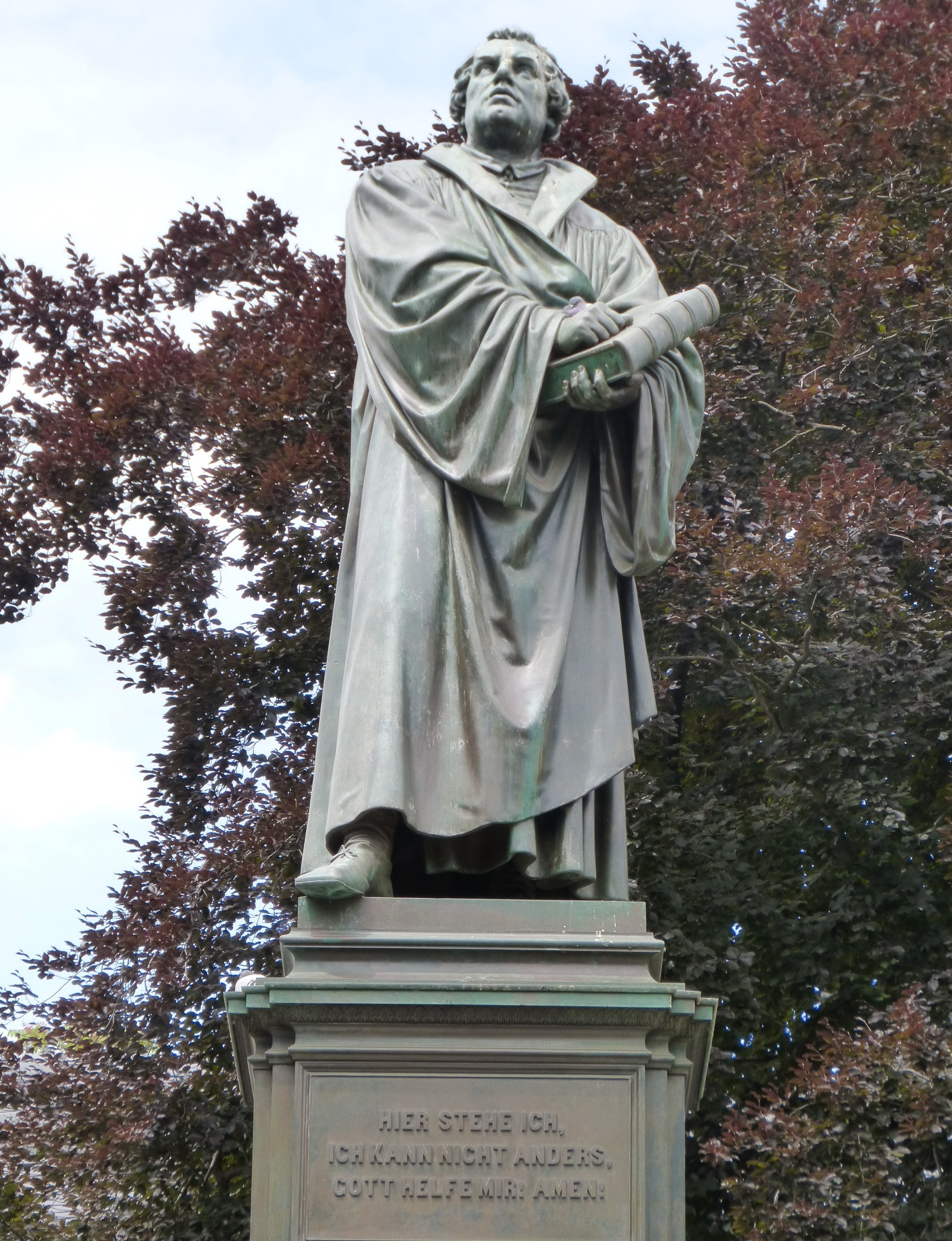
The Luther statue in Worms, Germany

The main events of the Diet of Worms relating to Luther took place from 16 to 18 April 1521.

On 16 April, Luther arrived in Worms. He was told to appear before the diet at 4 p.m. the following day. Jerome Schurff, Wittenberg professor in canon law, was Luther's lawyer before the diet. The Pope did not appear.

On 17 April, the imperial marshal, Ulrich von Pappenheim, and the herald, Caspar Sturm, came for Luther. Pappenheim reminded Luther that he should speak only in answer to direct questions from the presiding officer, Johann von Eck. Eck asked if a collection of books was Luther's and if he was ready to revoke their heresies. Schurff said: "Please have the titles read". There were 25 of them, probably including The Ninety-five Theses, Resolutions Concerning the 95 Theses, On the Papacy at Rome, To the Christian Nobility of the German Nation, On the Babylonian Captivity of the Church, and On the Freedom of a Christian. Luther requested more time for a proper answer, so he was given until the next day at 4 p.m.

On 18 April, Luther, saying that he had prayed for long hours and consulted with friends and mediators, presented himself before the diet. When the counselor put the same questions to him, Luther first apologized that he lacked the etiquette of the court. Then he answered, "They are all mine, but as for the second question, they are not all of one sort." Luther went on to place the writings into three categories: (1) Works which were well received even by his enemies: those he would not reject. (2) Books which attacked the abuses, lies, and desolation of the Christian world and the papacy: those, Luther believed, could not safely be rejected without encouraging abuses to continue. To retract them would be to open the door to further oppression, he said. "If I now recant these, then, I would be doing nothing but strengthening tyranny". (3) Attacks on individuals: he apologized for the harsh tone of these writings but did not reject the substance of what he taught in them; if he could be shown by Scripture that his writings were in error, Luther continued, he would reject them. Luther then concluded, saying:

Unless I am convinced by the testimony of the Scriptures or by clear reason (for I do not trust either in the pope or in councils alone, since it is well known that they have often erred and contradicted themselves), I am bound by the Scriptures I have quoted and my conscience is captive to the Word of God. I cannot and will not recant anything, since it is neither safe nor right to go against conscience. May God help me. Amen.

According to tradition, Luther is said to have declared, "Here I stand, I cannot do otherwise", before concluding with "God help me. Amen."

According to Luther, Eck informed Luther that he was acting like a heretic:

"Martin," said he, "there is no one of the heresies which have torn the bosom of the church, which has not derived its origin from the various interpretation of the Scripture. The Bible itself is the arsenal whence each innovator has drawn his deceptive arguments. It was with biblical texts that Pelagius and Arius maintained their doctrines. Arius, for instance, found the negation of the eternity of the Word—an eternity which you admit, in this verse of the New Testament—Joseph knew not his wife till she had brought forth her first-born son; and he said, in the same way that you say, that this passage enchained him. When the fathers of the council of Constance condemned this proposition of John Huss—The church of Jesus Christ is only the community of the elect, they condemned an error; for the church, like a good mother, embraces within her arms all who bear the name of Christian, all who are called to enjoy the celestial beatitude."

Private conferences were held to determine Luther's fate, but he was not arrested at Worms. Through negotiations by his prince, Frederick III, Luther was given a letter of safe conduct to and from the hearing. After his dismissal, he departed for his home in Wittenberg. However, fearing for Luther's safety, Frederick III sent men to fake a highway attack and abduct Luther, hiding him away at Wartburg Castle. Disguised as a knight, he was kept in protective custody at Wartburg Castle for nearly a year (early May 1521 to early March 1522). "There, high above the surrounding hills," Luther said, he was ensconced in the land of the birds. It was a fitting respite for one whom the Nuremberg Mastersinger Hans Sachs called "the Wittenberg nightingale".

The Edict of Worms was a decree issued on 25 May 1521 by Emperor Charles V. Its contents proscribed Luther's writings, declaring him a heretic and an enemy of the state, even permitting anyone to kill Luther without legal consequence: the imperial ban. Though it was never enforced, (the movement for reform and protection from Protestant supporters acted in his favour) Roman Catholic rulers sought to suppress Luther and his followers, and Luther's travels were restricted for the rest of his life. Beyond its political implications, the Edict of Worms had profound theological significance. Carter Lindberg notes that Luther's unwavering stance at Worms underscored a pivotal shift in Christian thought, emphasizing the authority of Scripture over ecclesiastical hierarchy. This moment crystallized the principle of sola scriptura, asserting that the Bible, rather than church tradition or papal authority, is the ultimate guide for faith and practice. Luther's appeal to individual conscience, guided by Scripture, laid the foundation for Protestant emphasis on personal faith and interpretation. However, this theological stance was roundly condemned by Catholic theologians.

It was the culmination of an ongoing struggle between Martin Luther and the Catholic Church over reform, especially concerning the practice of donations for indulgences. However, there were other deeper issues that revolved around both theological concerns:

- On a theological level, Luther had challenged the absolute authority of the Pope over the Church by maintaining that the doctrine of indulgences, as authorized and taught by the Pope, was wrong.
- Luther maintained that salvation was by faith alone (sola fide) without reference to good works, alms, penance, or the Church's sacraments. Luther maintained that the sacraments were a "means of grace", meaning that while grace was imparted through the sacraments, the credit for the action belonged to God and not to the individual.

== Other decisions ==
The Diet of Worms was also the occasion for Charles V to reform the administration of the Empire. The domains of the House of Habsburg stretched far beyond the Empire and included the Netherlands and Spain, which itself was gaining foreign colonies. Charles V was frequently travelling and juggling the business of his different territories. He appointed deputies, including the Governors of the Netherlands and the Regents of Spain, for the times he was absent.

Charles V elevated his younger brother Ferdinand to the status of Archduke as Imperial Lieutenant. As such, Ferdinand became regent and governor of the Austrian hereditary lands of Charles V and the Emperor's representative in Germany. Ferdinand's role as chairman of the German Imperial government was never implemented, however, and ended in 1523 with the body's dissolution. Ferdinand's rule of the Austrian lands in the name of the Emperor was confirmed with the secret Habsburg compact of Brussels in 1522, according to which Charles also agreed to favor the election of Ferdinand as King of the Romans in Germany, which took place in 1531.

Following the abdications of Charles V in 1556, Ferdinand succeeded Charles as emperor and became suo jure Archduke of Austria.

== Aftermath ==
When Martin Luther eventually emerged from Wartburg, the emperor, distracted with other matters, did not press for Luther's arrest. Ultimately, because of rising public support for Luther among the German people and the protection of certain German princes, the Edict of Worms was never enforced in Germany. However, in the Habsburg Netherlands, comprising present-day Belgium, Luxembourg, and the Netherlands, the Edict was initially enforced against Luther's most active supporters. This could be done because these countries were under the direct rule of Emperor Charles V and his appointed regent, Margaret of Austria, Duchess of Savoy and Charles' aunt.

In December 1521, Jacob Proost, prior of the Augustinian monastery in Antwerp, was the first Luther-supporting cleric to be arrested and prosecuted under the terms of the Worms Edict. In February 1522, Proost was compelled to make public recantation and repudiation of Luther's teachings. Later that year, additional arrests were made among the Augustinians in Antwerp. Two monks, Jan van Essen and Hendrik Vos, refused to recant; on 1 July 1523, they were burned at the stake in Brussels.

The 1522 and 1524 Diets of Nuremberg attempted to execute the judgement of the Edict of Worms against Luther, but they failed.
