= Man in a cube =

Coordinates: 50°58′23″N 10°19′13″E

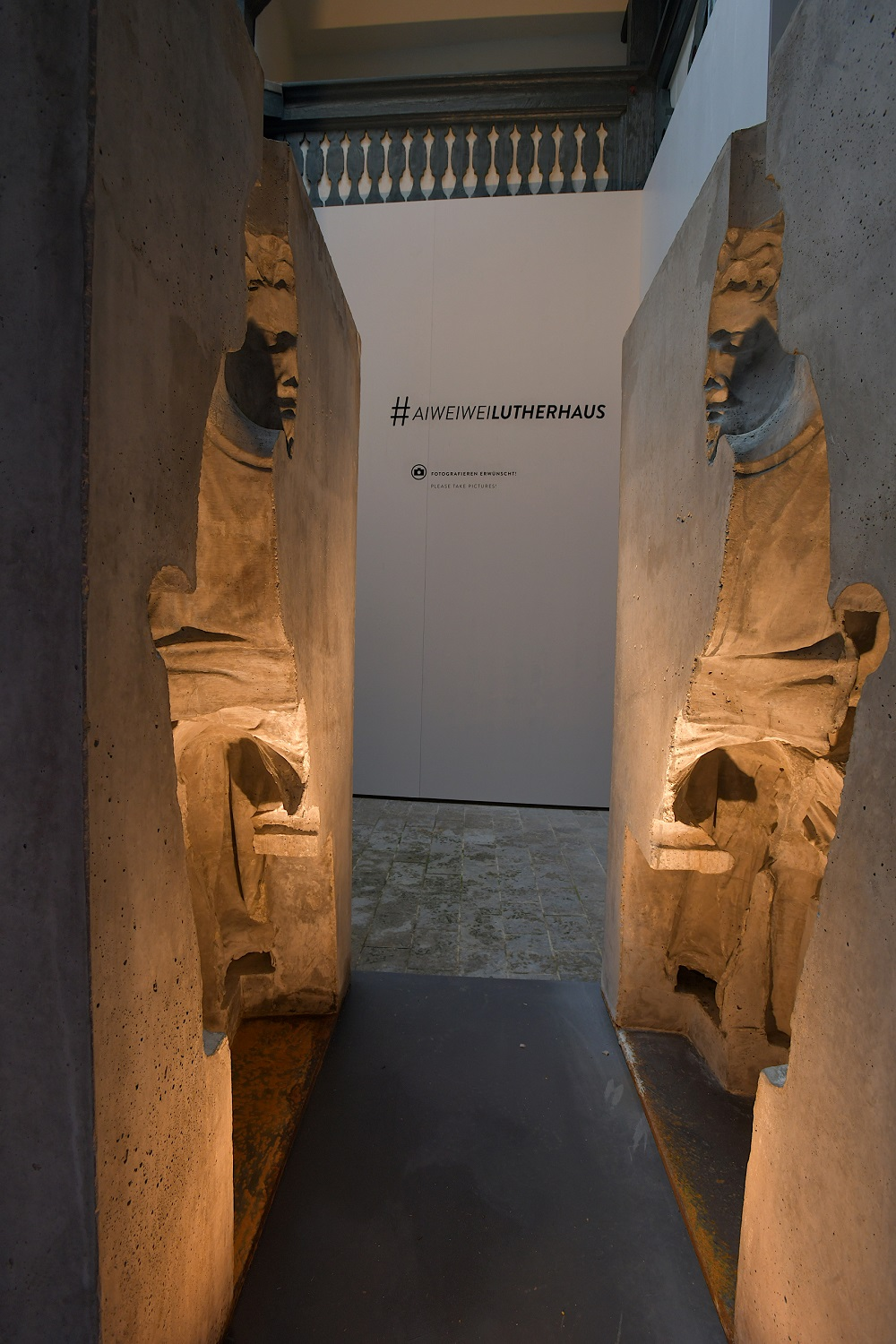
Man in a cube at the courtyard of the Lutherhaus Eisenach

Man in a cube is a contemporary sculpture created by Chinese artist Ai Weiwei in 2017 for the exhibition Luther and the Avant-Garde marking the quincentenary of the Reformation. It has been on permanent display in the courtyard of Lutherhaus Eisenach since October 2020.

== Description ==
The sculpture consists of two concrete slabs (je 150 x 105 x 52 cm) aligned parallel to each other. The sides facing each other produce a cavity with the form of a seated man. The figure’s face bears the artist’s features.

== Background ==
With man in a cube, Ai Weiwei is dealing with the oppressive experiences of his eighty-one day secret imprisonment by authorities in the People’s Republic of China. The artist himself described his work as “... a concrete block, which contains within it a single figure in solitude. That figure is the likeness of myself during my eighty-one days under secret detention in 2011. As an individual, once you have your idea and language, you can extend your existence through art.” Ideas and language are what sustained Ai Weiwei morally during his imprisonment. Ideas and language are what he finds intriguing about Martin Luther too: “Martin Luther is an important figure in German history, especially with his contributions towards language. He’s very impressive to me. An individual’s free expression is so important to our human development. I wanted to take part in this exhibition to memorialize him.”

== Original Display (2017) ==
The sculpture was created in 2017 for the exhibition Luther and the Avant-Garde in Lutherstadt Wittenberg during the Reformation quincentenary festivities and was displayed together with other contemporary works of art at the Old Prison there from May 19 to November 1, 2017. The exhibition’s overarching theme was artistic treatment of Martin Luther’s ideas elaborated in his treatise On the Freedom of a Christian.

== Permanent Display (since 2020) ==
The Stiftung Lutherhaus Eisenach had endeavored since 2017 to make the sculpture and “exceptional manifestation of contemporary Reformation commemoration” permanently accessible to the public. Supported by numerous backers, the museum finally succeeded in acquiring the sculpture in 2019. Man in a cube was permanently installed in the courtyard of the Lutherhaus in August of 2020, the quincentenary of Luther’s On the Freedom of a Christian, and presented to the public in a ceremony on October 9, 2020.
