= Alles, was von Gott geboren, BWV 80a =

Church cantata by Johann Sebastian Bach

Alles, was von Gott geboren
- BWV 80.1
- Church cantata by J. S. Bach
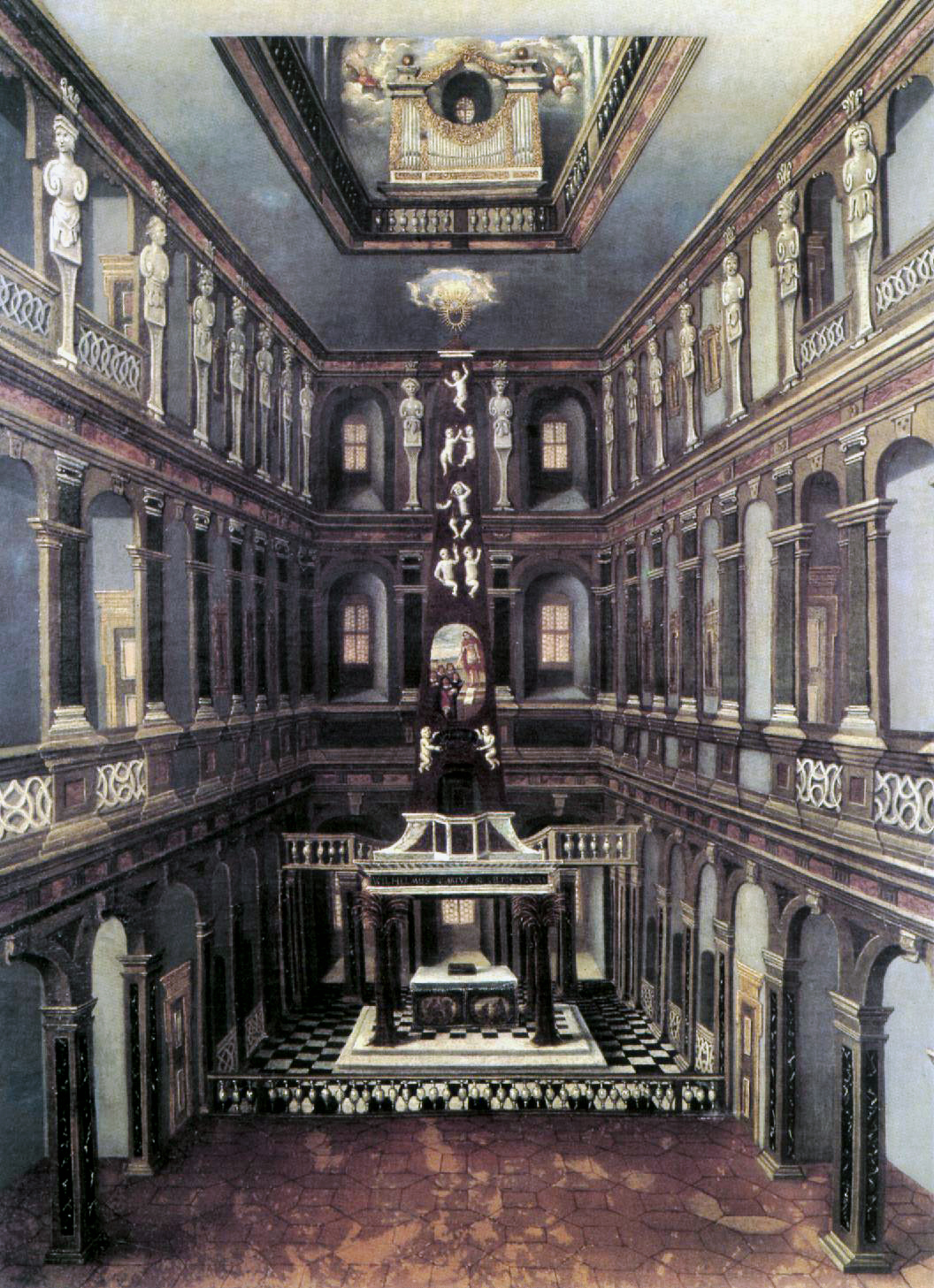
- The Schlosskirche in Weimar
- Related: Base for BWV 80
- Occasion: Oculi
- Cantata text: Salomon Franck
- Chorale: "Ein feste Burg ist unser Gott"
- Movements: 6

Alles, was von Gott geboren (All that is born of God), BWV 80.1 (formerly BWV 80a), is a church cantata by Johann Sebastian Bach. He composed it in Weimar for Oculi, the third Sunday in Lent, and first performed it on 24 March 1715 or 15 March 1716. The music is lost, but Bach expanded on it in about 1730 to create his chorale cantata for Reformation Day, Ein feste Burg ist unser Gott, BWV 80.

== History and words ==
On 2 March 1714 Bach was appointed concertmaster of the Weimar court capelle of the co-reigning dukes Wilhelm Ernst and Ernst August of Saxe-Weimar. As concertmaster, he assumed the principal responsibility for composing new works, specifically cantatas for the Schlosskirche (palace church), on a monthly schedule. Bach wrote the cantata for Oculi, the third Sunday in Lent. The prescribed readings for the Sunday were taken from the Epistle to the Ephesians, advice for a righteous life (Ephesians 5:1–9), and from the Gospel of Luke, casting out a devil (Luke 11:14–28). The cantata text was written by the court poet Salomon Franck and published in 1715 in Evangelisches Andachts-Opffer. The text of the first movement paraphrases a verse from the First Epistle of John, "For whatsoever is born of God overcometh the world" (1 John 5:4). The closing chorale is stanza 2 of Martin Luther's hymn Ein feste Burg ist unser Gott.

Possible dates for the first performance are 24 March 1715 (suggested by Alfred Dürr) and 15 March 1716 (proposed by Klaus Hofmann). Bach could not use the work in Leipzig, because no cantata music was performed there during Lent. He expanded on it in about 1730, resulting in his chorale cantata Ein feste Burg ist unser Gott, BWV 80, for Reformation Day. The first two movements, aria and recitative, were transformed to movements 2 and 3 of the later cantata, movements 4 and 5, recitative and aria, to movements 6 and 7.

== Scoring and structure ==
The cantata is scored for four vocal soloists (soprano, alto, tenor, and bass) and a four-part choir. The instrumentation is unknown.

1. Aria (bass): Alles, was von Gott geboren
2. Recitative (bass): Erwäge doch, Kind Gottes, die so große Liebe
3. Aria (soprano): Komm in mein Herzenshaus
4. Recitative (tenor): So stehe denn bei Christi blutgefärbten Fahne
5. Aria (alto, tenor): Wie selig ist der Leib
6. Chorale: Mit unser Macht ist nichts getan

== Music ==
Although the music is lost, aspects can be deduced from the later cantata for Reformation Day. Probably the first aria contained an instrumental cantus firmus of Luther's chorale Ein feste Burg ist unser Gott, sung by the soprano in BWV 80. Both recitatives begin secco and end as an arioso. The first one stresses the text "daß Christi Geist mit dir sich fest verbinde" (that Christ's Spirit to thine be firm united), the second "dein Heiland bleibt dein Hort" (your Saviour remains your shield). The closing chorale is a four-part setting of stanza 2 of Luther's hymn. Bach's harmonisation of that movement possibly survives in BWV 303.
