= Ein feste Burg ist unser Gott, BWV 80 =

Chorale cantata by J.S. Bach

Ein feste Burg ist unser Gott
- BWV 80
- Chorale cantata by J. S. Bach
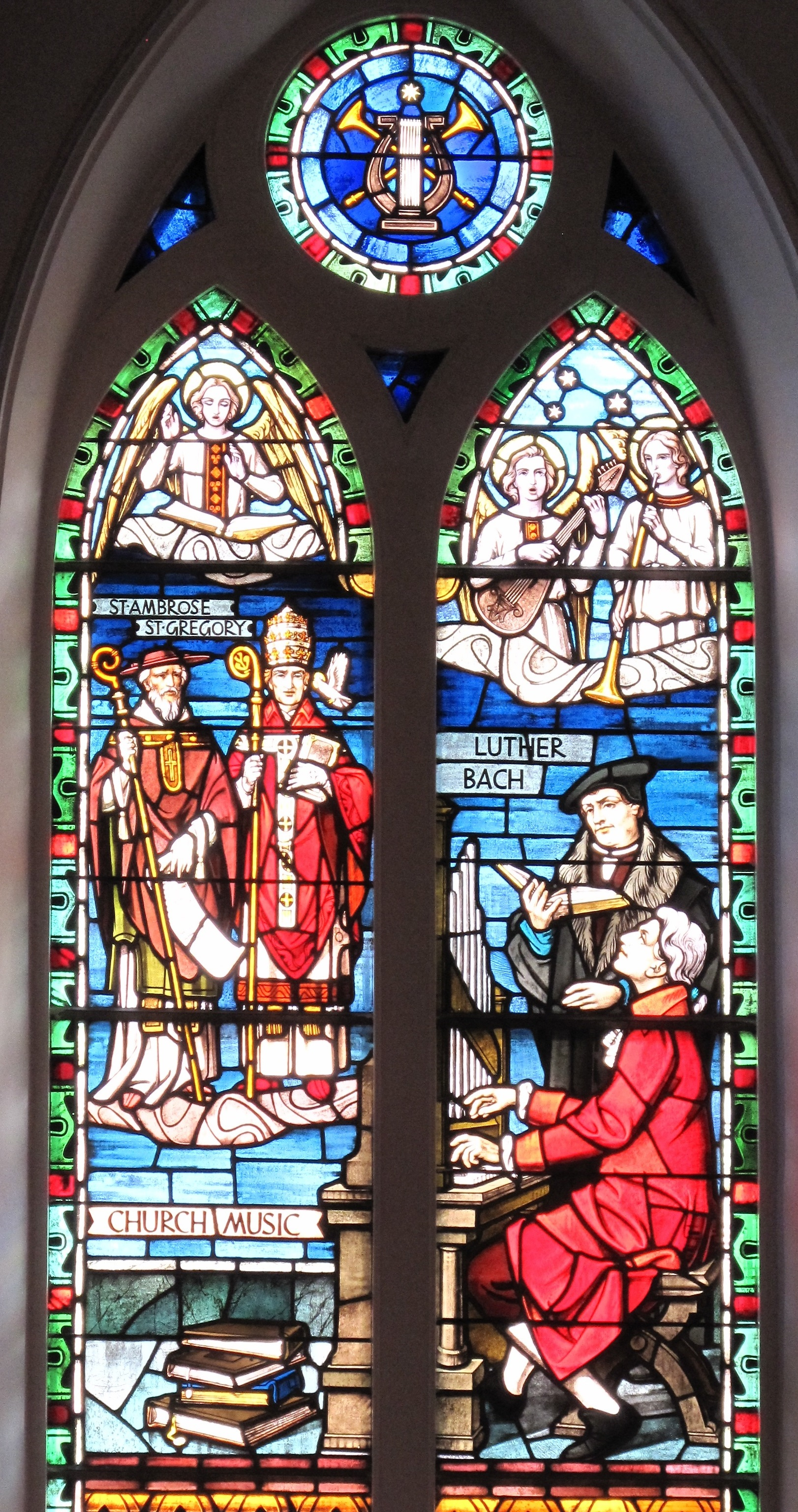
- Stained glass of Bach receiving inspiration from Luther (right pane)
- Occasion: Reformation Day
- Cantata text: Salomon Franck
- Chorale: "Ein feste Burg ist unser Gott" by Martin Luther
- Movements: eight
- Vocal: SATB choir and solo
- Instrumental: 3 oboes; 2 oboes d'amore; oboe da caccia; strings; continuo

Ein feste Burg ist unser Gott (A Mighty Fortress Is Our God), BWV 80 (also: BWV 80.3), is a chorale cantata for Reformation Day by Johann Sebastian Bach. He reworked it from one of his Weimar cantatas, Alles, was von Gott geboren, BWV 80a (also: BWV 80.1). The first Leipzig version of the church cantata, BWV 80b (also: BWV 80.2), may have been composed as early as 1723, some five months after Bach had moved to Leipzig. Some years later he reworked the cantata one more time, writing an extended chorale fantasia as its opening movement. The text of the BWV 80a version was written by Salomon Franck and contained one stanza of Martin Luther's hymn "Ein feste Burg ist unser Gott"; for his chorale cantata versions, BWV 80b and 80, Bach added the complete text of this Lutheran hymn.

Bach scored the cantata for four vocal soloists, a four-part choir and a Baroque chamber ensemble of up to three oboes of different kinds, strings and continuo. After his death, his son Wilhelm Friedemann Bach arranged the first and fifth movements, adopting a new text and adding trumpets and timpani.

Ein feste Burg ist unser Gott was published in 1821, the first of Bach's cantatas published after his death. The Bach Gesellschaft edition appeared half a century later, and included an extended instrumentation by Wilhelm Friedemann.

== History, hymn and compositions ==
Bach wrote the cantata in Leipzig for Reformation Day, celebrated annually on 31 October. In composing this work, Bach reused an earlier cantata, Alles, was von Gott geboren, BWV 80a, which he wrote in Weimar for the third Sunday in Lent and based on a text published in 1715 by Salomon Franck. This work, on which the Leipzig versions were based, was one of a few in which Bach quoted the same hymn twice, in a closing chorale and in an instrumental cantus firmus in the opening movement. In BWV 80a, he used the second stanza of Luther's hymn "Ein feste Burg ist unser Gott" ("A Mighty Fortress Is Our God"), which is "Mit unser Macht ist nichts getan" (With our might nothing is done), for the closing chorale. Bach could not use the earlier work at its intended time in Leipzig, because cantata music was prohibited there during Lent.

The hymn "Ein feste Burg ist unser Gott" was written by Luther in the late 1520s and became a symbol of the Reformation, adapted in compositions through the centuries, such as in Mendelssohn's Reformation Symphony, Meyerbeer's opera Les Huguenots, and Debussy's En blanc et noir.

The early Leipzig version (BWV 80b) began with a simple chorale setting of the hymn as the opening movement. This is the only version of the cantata for which autograph pages have survived. The surviving fragments are the only evidence of the BWV 80b version and give a very incomplete picture of it; they ended up in three libraries in two continents – the Bibliothèque Polonaise de Paris, the Rossijskaja nacional'naja biblioteka in Saint Petersburg, and the Princeton University Library in New Jersey. It is not certain when Bach wrote this version of the cantata. Two fragments are on paper with 1723 watermarks, leading musicologists like Christoph Wolff to conclude that Bach may have written a version of Ein feste Burg ist unser Gott as part of his first cantata cycle. Alfred Dürr proposes a time frame of 1728 to 1731 for its initial composition.

The 80b version may have already contained all four stanzas of Luther's hymn. The first stanza appears in the new first movement, the second is a cantus firmus in the second movement (the first movement of the Weimar cantata), and the other two may have been used in the fifth and eighth movements; both of these were chorale settings, as in the later Leipzig version (80.3). Wolff writes that Bach thus "may have anticipated the composition of the later series of chorale cantatas".

It is not known when Bach composed the elaborate opening movement of the final version. Dürr suggests 1735, because in that year Bach wrote Wär Gott nicht mit uns diese Zeit, BWV 14, which had an opening chorus of a comparable structure and was also based on a hymn by Luther. The final version includes all stanzas of the hymn but is nonetheless not in the format of Bach's second cantata cycle begun in 1724; in that chorale cantata cycle, each cantata relies exclusively on one Lutheran hymn.

Bach's son Wilhelm Friedemann Bach, who inherited the scores, later adapted the first and fifth movements, adding parts for three trumpets and timpani.

== Music ==
=== Structure and scoring ===
In the later Leipzig version (80.3), Bach structured the cantata in eight movements. He scored it for four vocal soloists (soprano (S), alto (A), tenor (T) and bass (B)) joined by a four-part choir (SATB) alongside a Baroque chamber ensemble of three oboes (Ob), two oboes d'amore (Oa), oboes da caccia or taille (Ta), two violins (Vl), viola (Va), cello (Vc), and various instruments playing the basso continuo line. The duration is given as 30 minutes by Dürr.

In the following table of the movements, the first column shows the movement number in BWV 80, with the corresponding number in BWV 80a shown in brackets. The scoring and keys are given for the late Leipzig version (80.3). The keys and time signatures are taken from Dürr, using the symbol for common time (4/4). The instruments are shown separately for winds and strings, while the basso continuo, playing throughout, is not shown. In the first movement, there are two basso continuo lines – the first played by a cello and harpsichord, and the second by a violone and organ.

Movements of Ein feste Burg ist unser Gott, BWV 80
No.	Title	Text	Type	Vocal	Winds	Strings	Key	Time
1	Ein feste Burg ist unser Gott	Luther	Chorale fantasia	SATB	3Ob (unis.)	2Vl Va	D major	common time
2 (1)	Alles, was von Gott geboren Mit unser Macht ist nichts getan	Franck; Luther	Aria e chorale	B S	Ob	2Vl Va (unis.)	D major	common time
3 (2)	Erwäge doch, Kind Gottes	Franck	Recitative	B				common time
4 (3)	Komm in mein Herzenshaus	Franck	Aria	S			B minor	12/8
5	Und wenn die Welt voll Teufel wär	Luther	Chorale	SATB	2Oa Ta	2Vl Va	D major	6/8
6 (4)	So stehe dann bei Christi blutgefärbter Fahne	Franck	Recitative	T				common time
7 (5)	Wie selig sind doch die, die Gott im Munde tragen	Franck	Aria duetto	A T	Ta	Vl	G major	6/8
8 (6)	Das Wort sie sollen lassen stahn	Luther	Chorale	SATB	2Oa Ta	2Vl Va	D major	common time

=== Movements ===
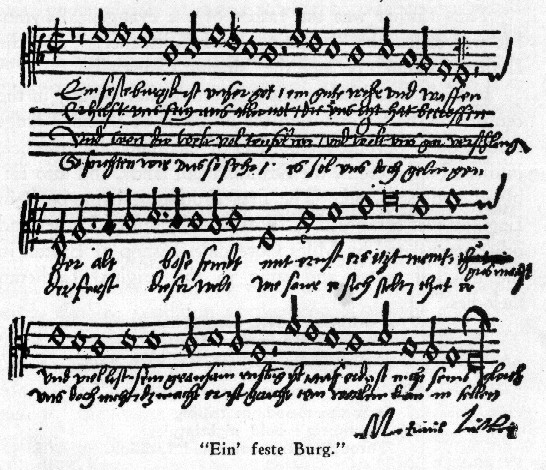
Luther's hymn

==== Chorale fantasia ====
The cantata opens with a chorale fantasia "with contrapuntal devices of awe-inspiring complexity". The movement in D major and common time elaborates on the first stanza of the hymn "Ein feste Burg ist unser Gott" ("A Mighty Fortress Is Our God"). It adopts a motet technique of having the instrumental and vocal lines follow each other closely. The Bach scholar Klaus Hofmann noted that the style relates to the "vocal polyphony of the sixteenth century" when the Luther hymn was written. Structurally, the movement repeats the first two phrases, adds four new shorter phrases, then concludes with another iteration of the second phrase, all performed on oboe. All four voices "discuss each phrase imitatively as a prelude to its instrumental entry" using fugal devices. The chorale also makes use of the cantus firmus, which is exclusively played in the basso continuo and oboe lines (in the movement's original form).

==== Aria e chorale ====
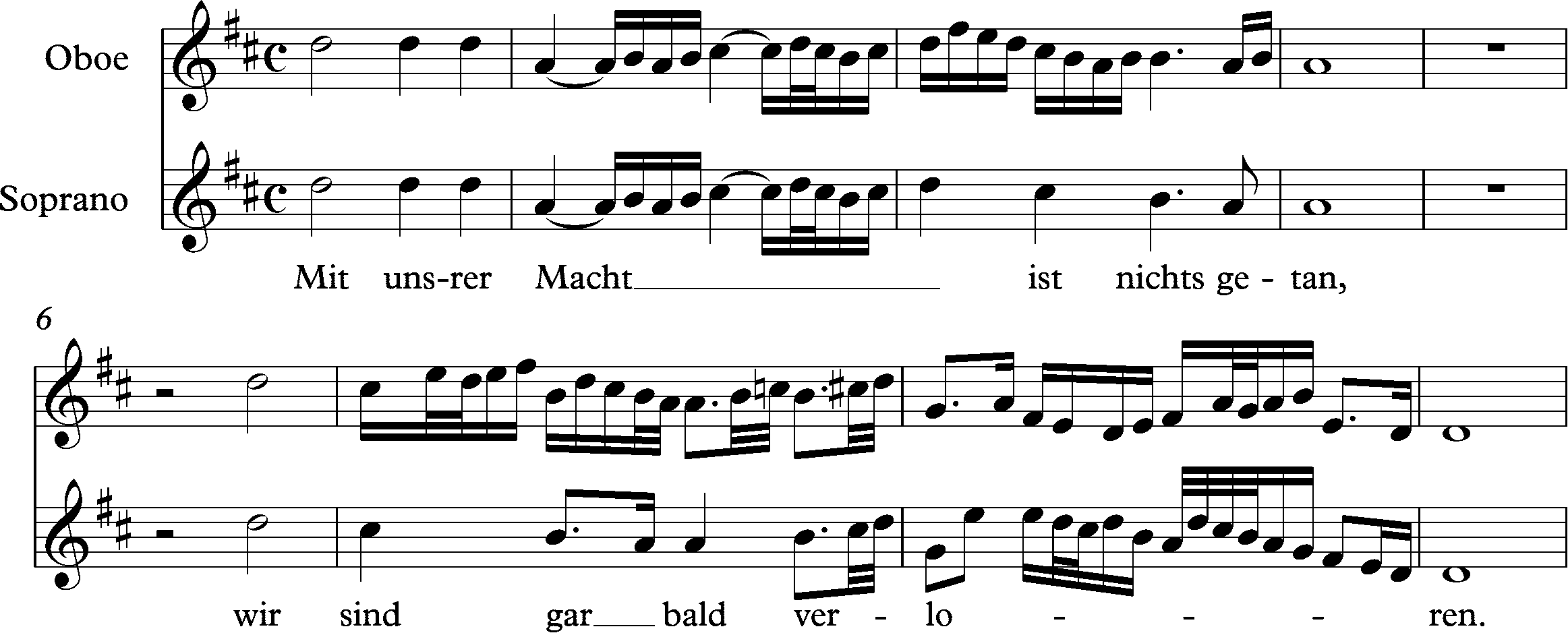
Beginning of the obbligato oboe and soprano parts during the hymn's second stanza

The second movement combines an aria and an embellished version of the chorale melody. The bass sings the free poetry in the first stanza of the hymn, "Alles, was von Gott geboren" (Everything that is born of God), while the oboe and soprano perform the second stanza, "Mit unser Macht ist nichts getan" (Nothing can be done through our strength). Like the first movement, the duet is in D major and common time. The musicologist Richard D. P. Jones interpreted the theme of the ritornello, played in unison by the strings, as a motto of victory corresponding to the two mentions of victory in the text. In the Weimar version, the instrumental quotation of the tune, used as the closing chorale, provided a structural unity to the cantata. Jones compared the "extremely florid" rendition of the tune, given to the soprano in both Leipzig versions (80.2 and 80.3), to the similar approach in the chorale played by the oboe d'amore in movement 5 of the Weimar cantata for Pentecost, Erschallet, ihr Lieder, BWV 172.

==== Bass recitative ====
The bass next sings "Erwäge doch, Kind Gottes" (Only consider, child of God) as a secco recitative ending in an arioso, the typical style of recitatives during the Weimar period. It adopts canonic imitation between the voice and continuo parts. The interaction illustrates the unity of Christians with Jesus reflected in the fragment: "dass Christi Geist mit dir sich fest verbinde" (that the spirit of Christ may be firmly united with you). The mystical element of this unity, which is also exemplified in the subsequent aria and the later duet, contrasts with the "combative" character of the outer movements, where the hymn tune prevails.

==== Soprano aria ====
The fourth movement, "Komm in mein Herzenshaus" (Come into my heart's house) is a soprano aria with a continuo ritornello. It is characterized by extensive melismas and a "floating and ethereal" melody. The soprano also sings the continuo melody.

==== Central chorale ====
The central chorale presents the third stanza of the hymn, "Und wenn die Welt voll Teufel wär" (And if the world were full of devils). The chorale melody is sung in unison, an unusual practice for Bach. The melody is unadorned and performed in 6/8 time signature. The orchestral accompaniment becomes more agitated and complex as the movement progresses.

==== Tenor recitative ====
The tenor recitative, "So stehe dann bei Christi blutgefärbter Fahne" (Then stand with Christ's bloodstained flag) is secco; like the earlier bass recitative, it concludes with an arioso. The movement includes "occasional furious melismas", used to underscore the sense of joy conveyed by the words.

==== Aria duetto ====
An alto and tenor duet, "Wie selig sind doch die, die Gott im Munde tragen" (How happy are they, who bear God in their mouths) is accompanied by continuo and obbligato violin with oboe da caccia. The movement is "submissive" in character with a texture that becomes more complex as the duet progresses, at one point including five simultaneous melodic lines. Bach uses a juxtaposition of "flowing, largely semi-quaver" instrumental parts with the vocal "crotchet/quaver rhythms" to depict the shield of the faithful; the two parts then coalesce to tell of the smiting of enemies.

==== Closing chorale ====
The final movement is a four-part setting of the last stanza of the hymn, "Das Wort sie sollen lassen stahn" (That word they must allow to stand). Also in D major, each of the SATB lines is doubled by one or more instruments, and each part has a smaller vocal range than in other movements to make them simpler for the congregation to sing. Each phrase ends with a pause to break up the structure, although these are not always performed.

== Reception ==
=== Manuscripts and publication ===
The oldest extant manuscript of Ein feste Burg ist unser Gott is by Bach's student and son-in-law Johann Christoph Altnikol. The cantata was published in 1821, the first Bach cantata to be published after the composer's death. The Bach Gesellschaft edition of the cantata, published half a century later, was printed with Wilhelm Friedemann Bach's extended instrumentation. This version was edited by Wilhelm Rust and appeared in volume 18, published in 1870 by Breitkopf & Härtel. The New Bach Edition (Neue Bach-Ausgabe, NBA) published the score of the Leipzig version (80.3) in 1987, edited by Frieder Rempp, with critical commentary following in 1988.

=== Arrangements ===
Theodore Thomas arranged the cantata for modern orchestra. This arrangement was performed in New York in the late 1800s, and was praised for "religiously preserving the spirit of the original".

=== Evaluation ===
Upon its initial publication in 1821, the cantata was positively received, as demonstrated by a laudatory 1822 article by critic Johann Friedrich Rochlitz, which praised its "profound, highly original and—one might say—unimaginable wealth of sound". Christoph Wolff suggests that this cantata "acquired not only the character of prototype for Bach's church cantatas but also that of paragon of Protestant chorale composition" as the "musical symbol of Lutheranism". Giacomo Meyerbeer cited this edition as exemplifying Lutheran music. The 1870 edition, in contrast, was incorporated into the growing German nationalist movement, to the point that it was a standard for German military broadcasts during the Second World War.

Modern musicologists agree that the chorale fantasia is an outstanding composition. For example, Craig Smith suggested that "in a genre in which Bach was the absolute master, this is probably the greatest motet chorus". Wolff wrote: "An immense chorale motet of 228 measures, it is one of Bach's most elaborate choral compositions and of the most impressive high points in the history of the chorale cantata."

=== Performances ===
Details of early performances of the work's versions are unknown. The 1982 Zwang catalogue places the first performance of BWV 80's early chorale cantata version in 1724. The first and fifth movements with Wilhelm Friedemann's extended instrumentation were performed with a new Latin text in 1763 in celebration of the end of the Seven Years' War.

The first American performance may have occurred as early as 1823 in Bethlehem, Pennsylvania; handmade copies of the parts dating to that time are held by the Moravian Archives. Other sources suggest an initial performance date of 1865 at Harvard University.

=== Recordings ===
- Tölzer Knabenchor & Concentus Musicus Wien, Nikolaus Harnoncourt, J. S. Bach - Das Kantatenwerk Volume 5. Teldec 1978.
- Münchener Bach-Chor & Münchener Bach-Orchester, Karl Richter. Bach Cantatas, Volume 5. DG Archiv 1994
- Collegium Vocale Gent & La Chapelle Royale, Philippe Herreweghe. J. S. Bach - Magnificat, Harmonia Mundi 2000.
- Gächinger Kantorei & Württemberg Chamber Orchestra, Helmuth Rilling. Bach: Cantatas, BWV 80-82, Hänssler 2000.
- Heinrich-Schütz-Chor Heilbronn & Pforzheim Chamber Orchestra, Fritz Werner. J. S. Bach - Cantatas Volume 2. Warner Classics 2004.
- Monteverdi Choir & English Baroque Soloists, John Eliot Gardiner. Bach Cantatas Volume 10. SDG 2005.
- Bach Collegium Japan, Masaaki Suzuki. J. S. Bach: Cantatas Vol. 27. BIS 2005.
- Amsterdam Baroque Orchestra & Choir, Ton Koopman. J. S. Bach - Complete Cantatas Volume 22. Challenge Classics 2006.
