= Dejudaization Institute Memorial =

Memorial installation in Eisenach, Germany

Coordinates: 50°34′54″N 10°11′39″E

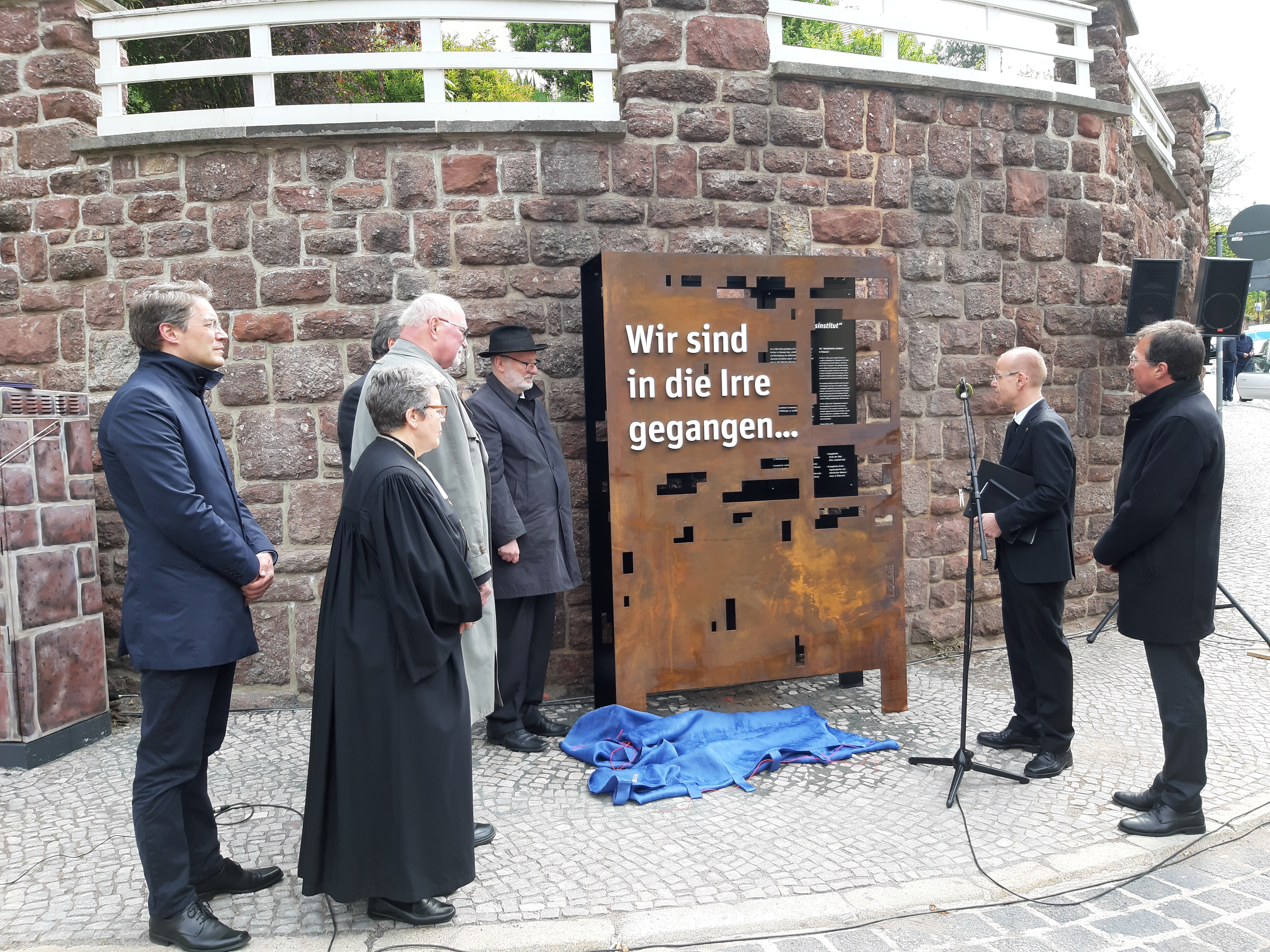
Memorial ceremony and unveiling of the "Dejudaization Institute" memorial on May 6, 2019

The 'Dejudaization Institute' Memorial (German: Mahnmal zum „Entjudungsinstitut“) is a memorial installation erected in Eisenach at the behest of eight Protestant regional churches. The memorial remembers the Protestant regional churches' culpability for the antisemitic Institute for the Study and Eradication of Jewish Influence on German Church Life they founded, which was active between 1939 and 1945 in the Nazi era. The memorial installation is intended to be understood as the Protestant churches' confession of guilt and as a memorial to the victims of the church's anti-Judaism and antisemitism. It was unveiled on May 6, 2019, eighty years after the founding of the "Dejudaization Institute".

== Background ==
On May 6, 1939, eleven Protestant regional churches founded the "Institute for the Study and Eradication of Jewish Influence on German Church Life", called the "Dejudaization Institute" for short, in Eisenach. The institute's stated mission was to obliterate the Jewish roots of Christianity, to delete every positive reference to the people of Israel and Judaism from Holy Scripture, and to bring the Protestant Church's teachings and liturgical practice into conformity with Nazi ideology. The institute was disbanded at the end of July 1945.

== The Memorial's Origins ==
There had been efforts since the early 1990s to remember the "Dejudaization Institute" and its aftermath publicly with a memorial in Eisenach. Repeated attempts to put up a memorial plaque on the building of the institute's former offices at Bornstrasse 11, the Church of Thuringia's former seminary, never got beyond the planning stage, though. In the run-up to the preparations for the special exhibition Study and Eradication: The Church's 'Dejudaization Institute', 1939–1945, Scholarly Director and Curator of the Stiftung Lutherhaus Eisenach Jochen Birkenmeier proposed undertaking a renewed attempt to put up a memorial plaque or stele in a letter of March 27, 2018, to Eisenach-Gerstungen Church District Superintendent Ralf-Peter Fuchs and Eisenach Mayor Katja Wolf. His proposal met with support from both addressees. Fuchs, however, recommended organizing the memorial on the regional church level. Birkenmeier therefore approached Bishop Ilse Junkermann of the Evangelical Church in Central Germany (EKM) on April 16, 2018, who supported the initiative immediately and asked the successors to the regional churches involved in founding the "Dejudaization Institute" for their collaboration.

Representatives of the Stiftung Lutherhaus Eisenach, the Eisenach municipal government and Eisenach-Gerstungen Church District inspected sites together on June 18, 2018. After consulting together, they declared the site at the beginning of Bornstrasse to be particularly suitable. The location at a fork in the road additionally made it possible to incorporate the words "We went astray" from the "Darmstadt Statement" in the memorial's design.

Following lengthy planning and finalization, the EKM and Stiftung Lutherhaus Eisenach were ultimately able to implement their collaborative project on schedule. Birkenmeier managed the memorial installation project. Funding and coordination with the regional churches were in the hands of Bishop Ilse Junkermann. Eisenach municipal government assisted the project with guidance during the building and permit process. Six representatives of regional Protestant churches solemnly unveiled the memorial on May 6, 2019.

== The Institutions that Commissioned the Memorial ==
The memorial was commissioned by the legal successors to the regional churches involved in founding the "Dejudaization Institute" in 1939: the Evangelical Church in Central Germany, the Evangelical Lutheran Church in Northern Germany, the Evangelical Lutheran Church of Saxony, the Evangelical Church of Anhalt, the Evangelical Church in Hesse-Nassau, the Evangelical Lutheran Church in Oldenburg, the Evangelical Church of the Palatinate (Protestant Regional Church), and the Evangelical Church of the Augsburg and Helvetic Confessions in Austria. The Union of Evangelical Churches is represented by individual member churches.

== Site ==
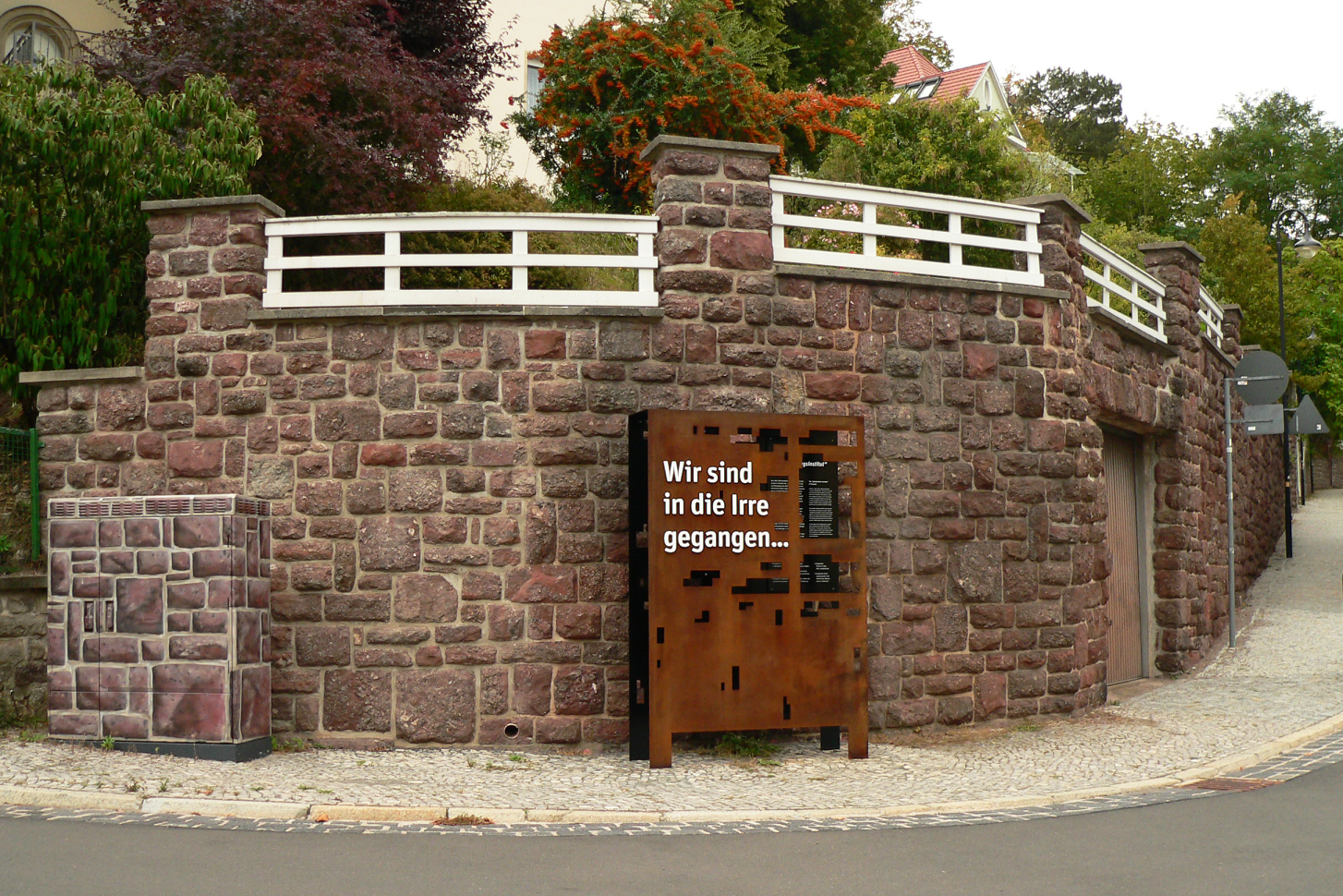
Installation situation of the memorial

The memorial in Eisenach is located at the beginning of Bornstrasse (corner of Johann-Sebastian-Bach-Strasse and Am Ofenstein), approximately 240 meters away from the "Dejudaization Institute's" former first offices at Bornstrasse 11. The site was selected because it is more visible and more readily accessible from the downtown than the actual building located on a steep incline. The conditions at the selected site were significantly better for the erection of a memorial too.

== Design ==
The memorial, measuring approximately 200 x 148 x 42 cm, was designed by Marc Pethran from KOCMOC.NET design agency in Leipzig following suggestions for its composition from the Stiftung Lutherhaus Eisenach in conjunction with the EKM and its Advisory Council for Christian-Jewish Dialogue and built by Obornik Werbetechnik KG in Hildesheim. The body of the memorial consists of Cor-Ten steel plates, individual segments of which have been cut out. Among other things, this is to be understood as a reference to the 'dejudaization' of the texts of the New Testament and the Protestant hymnal as well as the destruction of the common foundations of Judeo-Christian belief by the "Dejudaization Institute".

== Inscriptions ==
The memorial bears the German inscription "Wir sind in die Irre gegangen…" (We went astray...) on the outer plate, a quotation from the "Darmstadt Statement", a Protestant confession of guilt from the year 1947. The inner plate displays an explanatory inscription in German and English. The text follows a draft by Jochen Birkenmeier with minor additions by Bishop Ilse Junkermann. The English text reads:

The "Dejudaization Institute" in Eisenach On May 6, 1939, eleven regional Protestant churches established the "Institute for the Study and Eradication of Jewish Influence on German Church Life" in Eisenach. This institute's mission was to obliterate the Jewish roots of Christianity, to delete every positive reference to the people of Israel and Judaism from Holy Scripture, and to bring the Protestant Church's teachings and liturgical practice into conformity with Nazi ideology. The institute's staff perverted the word and spirit of the Gospel in the name of völkisch theological scholarship, stirred up hatred against Judaism, and strove for the exclusion of Christians with Jewish ancestry from the Protestant Church. They helped justify the persecution and millions of murders of fellow Jewish citizens with their work. The first offices of the "Dejudaization Institute" were located just a few meters from here at Bornstrasse 11. The successor churches to the complicit regional churches have therefore erected this memorial here in recognition of their guilt and in remembrance of the victims of anti-Judaism and anti-Semitism. Eisenach, May 6, 2019 Evangelical Church in Central Germany, Evangelical Lutheran Church in Northern Germany, Evangelical Lutheran Church of Saxony, Evangelical Church of Anhalt, Evangelical Church in Hesse-Nassau, Evangelical Lutheran Church in Oldenburg, Evangelical Church of the Palatinate (Protestant Regional Church), Evangelical Church of the Augsburg and Helvetic Confessions in Austria

This text was translated into English by Krister G.E. Johnson.
