= On the Babylonian Captivity of the Church =

16th-century theological treatise by Martin Luther

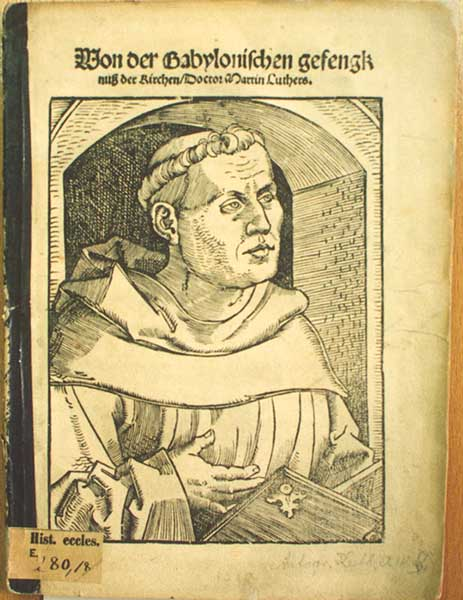
- Frontispiece
- Author: Martin Luther
- Language: Latin, German
- Genre: Theological treatise
- Publication date: 1520
- Publication place: Germany

Prelude on the Babylonian Captivity of the Church (Latin: De captivitate Babylonica ecclesiae, praeludium Martini Lutheri, October 1520) was the second of the three major treatises published by Martin Luther in 1520, coming after the Address to the Christian Nobility of the German Nation (August 1520) and before On the Freedom of a Christian (November 1520). The book-length work was theological, and as such was published in Latin as well as German, the language in which the treatises were written.

== Context ==
The book was circulating in print not quite a week when the papal bull against Luther arrived in Wittenberg in October 1520. The bull and the book were being prepared simultaneously.

Luther accuses the Catholic Church and the papacy of keeping the church in captivity, equating Rome with the biblical Babylon that exiled the Israelites from their homeland, holding them captive in Babylon. According to Luther, the pope was holding the church in captivity through the use of the sacramental system and Catholic theology.

In 1521, Luther was requested to either confess or recant his books, including his treatise The Babylonian Captivity of the Church. It still defines the Confessional Lutheran relationship to the number of sacraments.

== Content ==
In this work Luther examines the seven sacraments of the Catholic Church in the light of his interpretation of the Bible. With regard to the Eucharist, he advocates for the laity to receive communion under both kinds, dismisses the Catholic doctrine of transubstantiation but affirms the real presence of the body and blood of Christ in the Eucharist, and rejects the teaching that the Mass is a sacrifice offered to God.

With regard to baptism, he writes that it brings justification only if conjoined with saving faith in the recipient; however, it remains the foundation of salvation even for those who might later fall and be reclaimed.

As for penance, its essence consists in the words of promise (absolution) received by faith. Only these three can be regarded as sacraments because of their divine institution and the divine promises of salvation connected with them; but strictly speaking, only Baptism and the Eucharist are sacraments, since only they have "divinely instituted visible sign[s]": water in Baptism and bread and wine in the Eucharist. Luther claimed that Confirmation, Matrimony, Holy Orders, and Extreme Unction are not sacraments.

Luther wrote that marriage was not a sacrament because God the Father gave marriage to Adam and Eve in the Garden of Eden and Jesus did not give humans the ability to marry. He also defended the marriages of Muslims and Jews, and thought they were valid under God just as much as Christian marriages.

The titular "captivity" is firstly the withholding the cup in the Lord's Supper from the laity, the second the doctrine of transubstantiation, and the third, the Roman Catholic Church's teaching that the Mass was a sacrifice and a good work.

The work is angry in tone, attacking the papacy, and at some points, even defending some practices of Muslims and Jews. Although Luther had made a link tentatively in the address To the Christian Nobility of the German Nation, this was the first time he forthrightly accused the pope of being the Antichrist. For the clerical audience whose offices were justified by the performance of sacraments, Luther's reassessment of the whole sacramental system made The Babylonian Captivity one of his most controversial works. The title alone reflects his sense of utter alienation from the institutional church. The Christian people were, like the people of Israel, held in tyranny and bondage by the Roman hierarchy. This was a complex work, written in Latin for a scholarly audience. Luther began rather sensationally by repudiating some of his early writings, which he now found overly timid. For Luther's restless search for fundamental truths had led him to a root-and-branch reassessment of the Roman sacramental system. Of the seven sacraments that underpinned the Christian life, Luther was now prepared to recognize only three: the Eucharist, baptism, and (with reservations) penance. It was in his treatment of the Mass that Luther most stunned his readers. The Church had surely erred in denying the laity the cup: in this, he now calmly proposed, the Bohemian Hus had been correct. But the core of the issue lay in his denial of the central sacrificial act that lay at the heart of the Mass, transubstantiation. In asking his clerical readers to repudiate their whole sacramental system, Luther offered his most shocking view of his new theological program. The Mass lay at the heart of the clerical office. By paring back the sacraments from seven to three, Luther had demolished the church's role as a sacramental institution, nourishing the Christian from cradle (baptism) to death (extreme unction). Many of its readers regarded this as the most scandalous of all Luther's writings.

Although published in Latin, a translation of this work was quickly published in German by Luther’s opponent, the Strasbourg Franciscan Thomas Murner. He hoped that by making people aware of the radical nature of Luther’s beliefs, they would realise their foolishness in supporting him. In fact, the opposite proved true, and Murner’s translation helped to spread Luther’s views across Germany. The virulence of Luther's language however, was off-putting to some. After the publication of this work, with its harsh condemnation of the papacy, the renowned humanist Erasmus, who had previously been cautiously supportive of Luther's activities, became convinced that he should not support Luther's calls for reform.
