= On the Freedom of a Christian =

1520 reforming treatise by Martin Luther

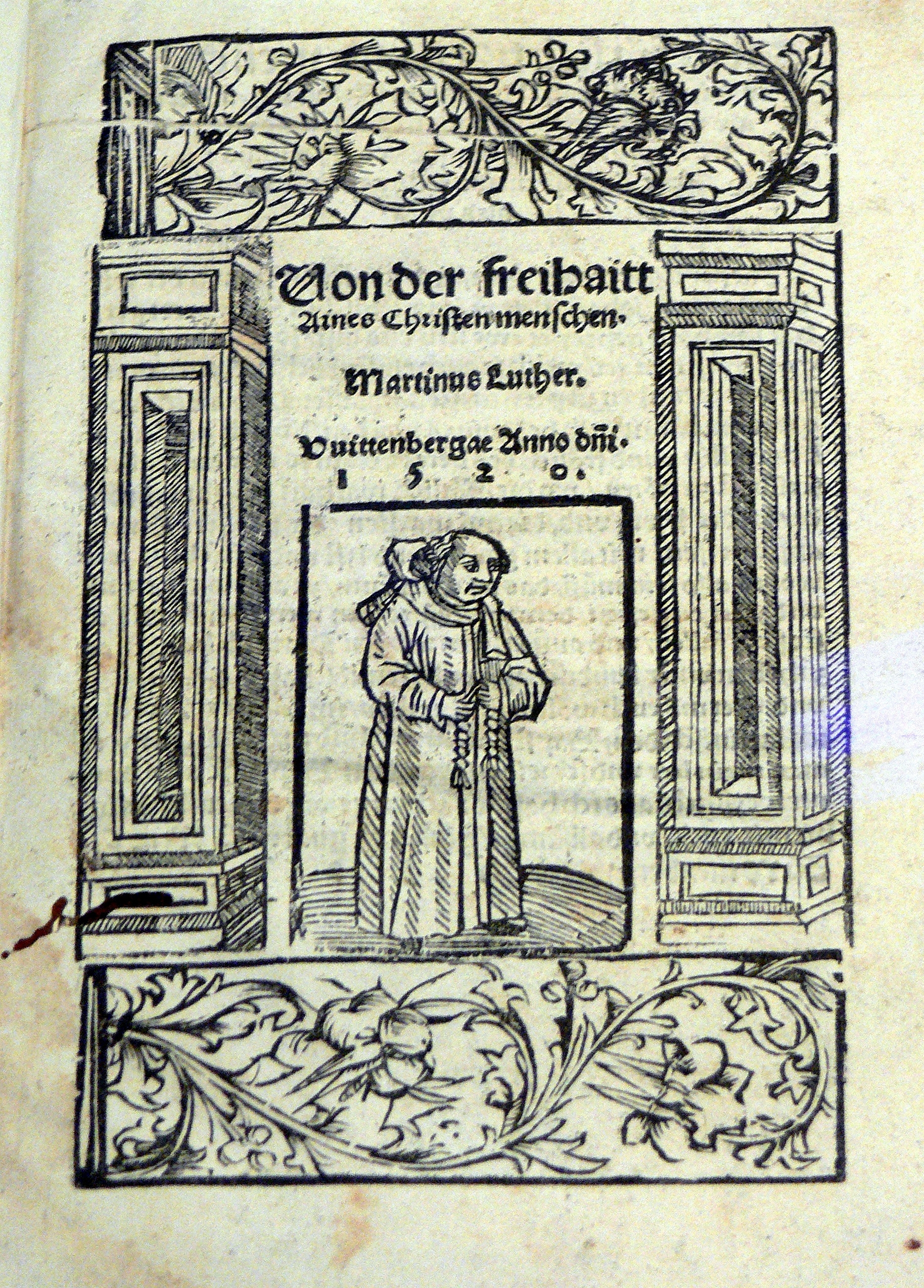
On the Freedom of a Christian (title page, first German edition, 1520)

On the Freedom of a Christian (Latin: "De Libertate Christiana"; German: "Von der Freiheit eines Christenmenschen"), sometimes also called A Treatise on Christian Liberty, was the third of Martin Luther’s major reforming treatises of 1520, appearing after his Address to the Christian Nobility of the German Nation (August 1520) and the work Prelude on the Babylonian Captivity of the Church (October 1520). The work appeared in a shorter German and a more elaborate Latin form. There is no academic consensus whether the German or the Latin version was written first.

The treatise developed the concept that as fully forgiven children of God, Christians are no longer compelled to keep God's law to obtain salvation; however, they freely and willingly serve God and their neighbors. Luther also further develops the concept of justification by faith. In the treatise, Luther stated, "A Christian man is the most free lord of all, subject to none. A Christian man is most dutiful servant of all, and subject to everyone."

== See also ==
- Antinomianism
- Biblical law in Christianity
