= To the Christian Nobility of the German Nation =

1520 treatise by Martin Luther

To the Christian Nobility of the German Nation (German: An den christlichen Adel deutscher Nation) is the first of three tracts written by Martin Luther in 1520. In this work, he defined for the first time the signature doctrines of the priesthood of all believers and the two kingdoms. The work was written in the vernacular language, German, rather than in Latin.

== History ==
The Disputation of Leipzig (1519) brought Luther into contact with the humanists, particularly Melanchthon, Reuchlin, Erasmus, and associates of the knight Ulrich von Hutten, who, in turn, influenced the knight Franz von Sickingen. Von Sickingen and Silvester of Schauenburg wanted to place Luther under their protection by inviting him to their fortresses in the event that it would not be safe for him to remain in Saxony because of the threatened papal ban. Between the Edict of Worms in April 1521 and Luther's return from the Wartburg in March 1522 a power struggle developed of who was to lead the Reformation through its competing possibilities and how the Reformers should follow their teachings. In Wittenberg each interested party – prince, town council and commune – wished to expand its influence on the governance of the church in accord with its own values and needs. Through this the question of authority appeared. The church made a strong attempt at drawing distinct lines on saying who had authority in the spiritual sphere and its matters. This division of Christians into spheres motivated Luther to write on the "three walls" the "Romanists" created to protect themselves from reform, this was the letter "to the Christian Nobility of the German Nation".

Under those circumstances, complicated by the crisis then confronting the German nobles, Luther issued his To the Christian Nobility of the German Nation (Aug. 1520), committing to the laity, as spiritual priests, the reformation required by God but neglected by the pope and the clergy. This treatise, which has been called a "cry from the heart of the people" and a "blast on the war trumpet," was the first publication Luther produced after he was convinced that a break with Rome was both inevitable and unavoidable. In it he attacked what he regarded as the "three walls of the Romanists": (1) that secular authority has no jurisdiction over them; (2) that only the pope is able to explain Scripture; (3) that nobody but the Pope himself can call a general church council. Luther then describes what he saw as the issues facing the church of his day, such as the amount of power held by the pope or the abuses of the church against the German people, drawing on complaints German nobles had been making. The document ends with a list of 27 proposals for reform to be taken by the church or the secular authorities.

=== The First Wall: Spiritual Power over Temporal ===
The first wall of the "Romanists" that Luther criticized was that of the division of the spiritual and the temporal states. Through that criticism, Luther states how there is no difference among the states beyond that of office. He elaborated further by quoting Saint Peter and the Book of Revelation stating that through baptism we were consecrated as priests. Through that statement, he attempted to diminish the Church's authority significantly and describes priests as nothing more than "functionaries". Luther provides the example of "if ten brothers, co-heirs as king's sons, were to choose one from among them to rule over their inheritance, they would all still remain kings and have equal power, although one is ordered to govern." From this statement Luther calls for religious office to be held by elected officials, stating that "if a thing is common to all, no man may take it to himself without the wish and command of the community." Therefore, through that criticism, Luther took authority from the Church by saying that everyone is a priest and gave more authority to govern to the temporal sphere.

The problem that arises from it can be found in a letter written by an anonymous Nürnberger, "Whether Secular Government has the Right to Wield the Sword in Matters of Faith." This article raises the question of how much governing control was acceptable for the temporal authorities to have over the spiritual sphere. From Luther's letter temporal authorities took too much control and were executing and banishing for reasons of faith, but at the same time the papists were burning and hanging "everyone who is not of their faith." Thus, the question of who was to have authority to govern the spiritual sphere.

=== The Second Wall: Authority to Interpret Scripture ===
In the second part of the letter, Luther debates the point that it is the Pope's sole authority to interpret, or confirm interpretation of, scriptures, the large problem being that there is no proof announcing this authority is the Pope's alone and thus assuming this authority for themselves. Through that criticism, Luther allowed the laity to have a standard to base their faith on and not an official's interpretation, thus detracting more from the Church's control over the sphere. That criticism, unlike in the first wall, supported a strong base of the reformation, the break away from the rules and traditions of the Catholic Church. The Reformation was based on setting the standard on the Scriptures, not on church dogma. That made the reformers have a standard to look to for laws and regulations concerning their faith.

=== The Third Wall: Authority to Call a Council ===
This final part to Luther's letter is the largest demonstration of his desire to see authority in control over the spiritual sphere shift to the temporal sphere. The Church protected itself by preventing anyone other than the Pope from calling a council to discuss spiritual affairs. To AlsoLuther states that anyone should have the ability to call a council if they find a problem or issue of the spiritual sphere. Further, Luther delegates the "temporal authorities" to be best suited for calling a council as they are "fellow-Christians, fellow-priests, sharing one spirit and one power in all things, and [thus] they should exercise the office that they received from God." This shift in power to the temporal authorities in faith matters became a larger problem later in the Reformation. Confrontations arose as to who had the right to interfere in matters of faith such as at what point is it acceptable for the government to stop a new religion from forming. An example of the confrontation can be found in a document by an unknown Nürnberger, entitled "Whether Secular Government has the Right to Wield the Sword in Matters of Faith." The document asked whether military force that was employed to stop uprising violence, whether applied by the government or the church, is the Christian thing to do. Some believed that violence begot more violence and that "those that lived by the sword would die by the sword", but others believed it was the secular sphere's duty to protect its people and stop new faiths from forming. They made use of the Old Testament as proof for their statements and relied on ancient tradition and papal interpretation.

== Bibliography ==
- Johannes Brenz: An Answer to the Memorandum that Deals with this Question: Whether Secular Government has the Right to Wield the Sword in Matters of Faith. May 8, 1530
- Estes, James M. (1994), Whether Secular Government has the Right to Wield the Sword in Matters of Faith: a controversy in Nürnberg, 1530, Toronto: Victoria University.
- Lindberg, Carter (2006), The European Reformations, Boston: Blackwell.
- Martin Luther: Letter to the Princes of Saxony Concerning the Rebellious Spirit July, 1524
- Martin Luther: The Ninety-five Theses, in Martin Luther: Documents of Modern History, ed. Benjamin Drewery and E. G. Rupp. London: Edward Arnold, 1970
- Montover, Nathan (2011). The Political Dimensions of Martin Luther's Universal Priesthood. Cambridge: The Lutterworth Press. ISBN 9781608999934.
- Rupp, E. G.; Drewery, Benjamin (1970), Martin Luther, Documents of Modern History, London: Edward Arnold.
- Spitz, Lewis W. (1987), The Renaissance and Reformation Movements (rev. ed.), St. Louis: Concordia Publishing House, p. 338.
- Unknown Author (Linck, Wenceslaus or Osiander, Andreas?). Whether a Secular Government may Regulate Spiritual Matters, Restrain False Teaching, and Put Down Ungodly Abuses. 1530
- Unknown Author (Wenceslaus Linck or Andeas Osiander). Whether Secular Christian Government Has the Power to Ban False Preachers or Erring Sects and to Establish Order in Ecclesiastical Affairs. 1530
