= Glatz (surname) =

Glatz is a surname. Notable people with the surname include:

- Ferenc Glatz (born 1941), Hungarian historian and academic
- Ilse von Glatz (1958–2014), Canadian actress
- Kaspar Glatz (died 1551), German minister

== See also ==
- Glatz (disambiguation)
- Michael Glatze (born 1975), American activist
- Glatzer, a surname
