= Katharina von Bora =

Wife of Martin Luther (c. 1499–1552)

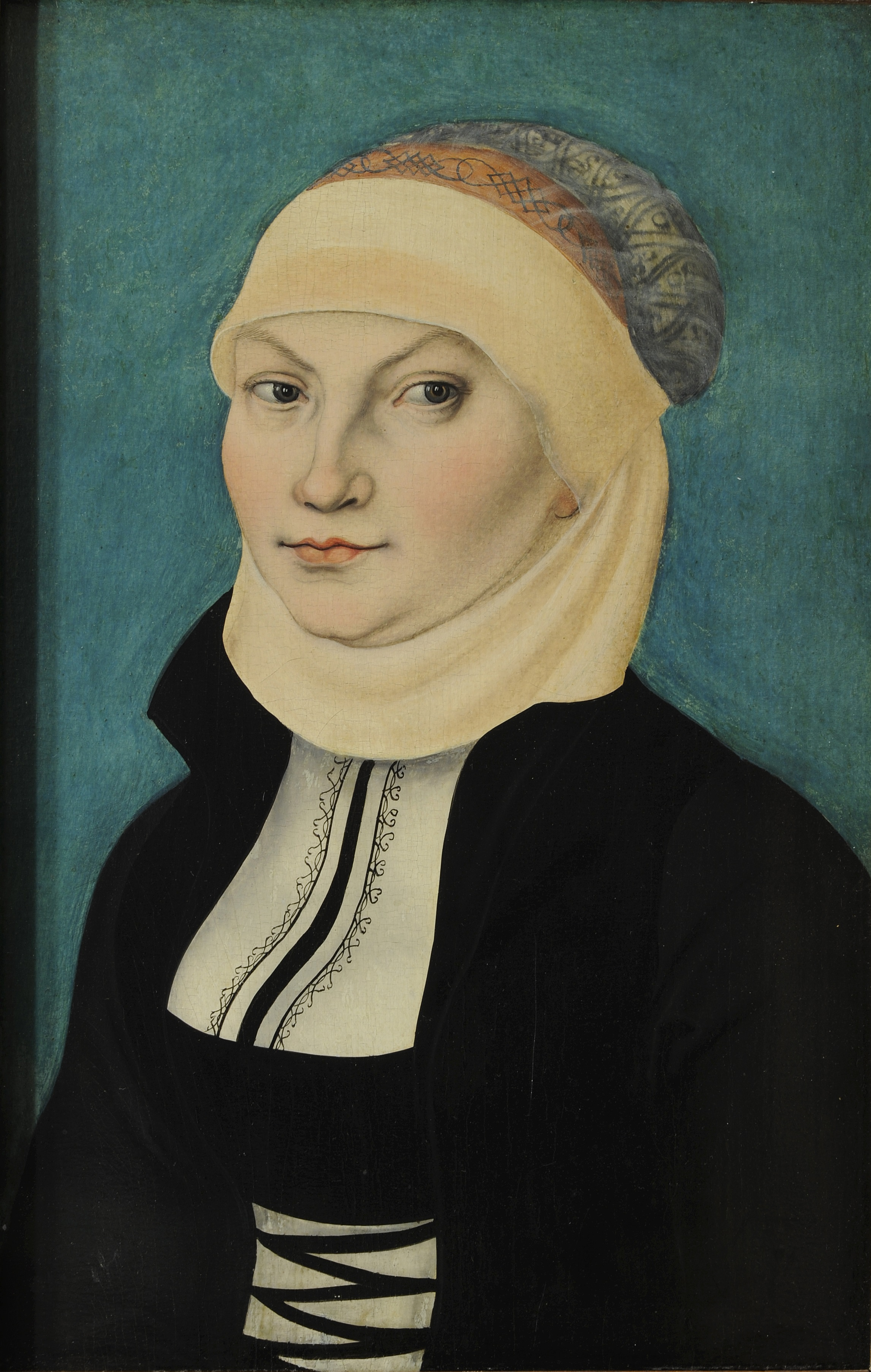
- Portrait by Lucas Cranach the Elder, 1528
- Born: 29 January 1499? Lippendorf?, Electorate of Saxony, Holy Roman Empire
- Died: 20 December 1552 (aged 53); Torgau, Electorate of Saxony, Holy Roman Empire
- Spouse: Martin Luther (m. 1525; died 1546)
- Children: Hans (Johannes); Elisabeth; Magdalena; Martin; Paul; Margarete

Katharina von Bora (29 January 1499? – 20 December 1552; German: [fɔn ˈboːʁaː]), also referred to as "die Lutherin" ('the Lutheress'), or sometimes by modernized naming conventions Katharina Luther, was the wife of the German reformer Martin Luther and a seminal figure of the Protestant Reformation. Although little is known about her, she is often considered to have been important to the Reformation, her marriage setting a precedent for Protestant family life and clerical marriage.

== Ancestry ==
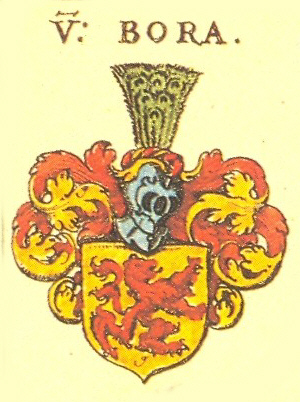
Coat of arms of the von Bora family

Katharina von Bora was born to a family of minor Saxon nobility. According to common belief, she was born on 29 January 1499 in Lippendorf, but there is no evidence of this in contemporary documents. Due to there being multiple branches in her family and the uncertainty of her birth name, there are diverging theories about her place of birth. One of them proposes that she was born in Hirschfeld and that her parents were Hans von Bora zu Hirschfeld and his wife, born Anna von Haugwitz. It is also possible that Katharina was the daughter of Jan von Bora auf Lippendorf and his wife Margarete, both of whom were only mentioned in 1505.

== Early life ==
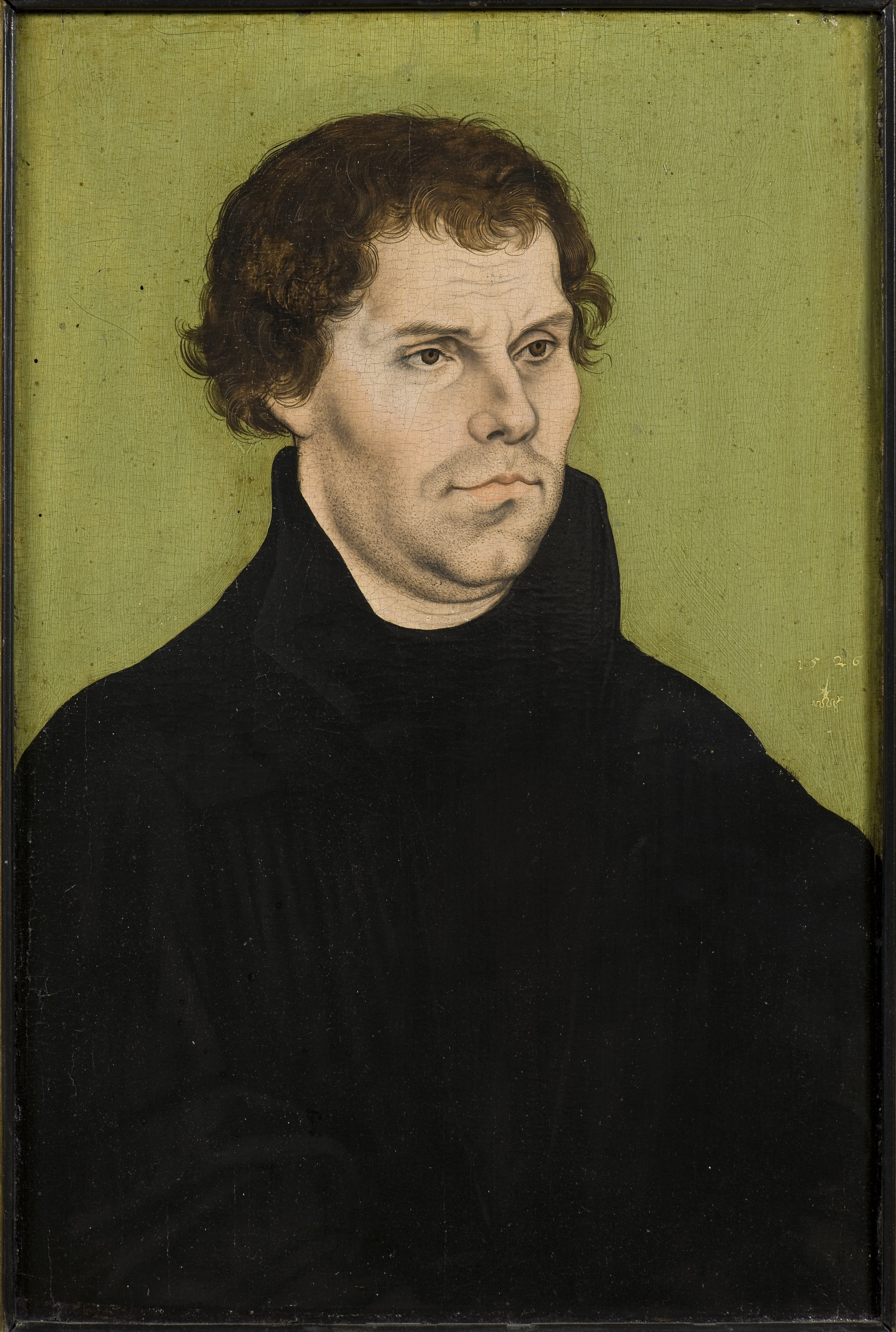
A portrait of Martin Luther in 1526 by Lucas Cranach the Elder

Her father sent five-year-old von Bora to a Benedictine convent in Brehna in 1504 to be educated, according to a letter Laurentius Zoch sent to Martin Luther in 1531. At the age of nine, she was moved to Nimbschen Abbey, Cistercian community named Marienthron ('Mary's Throne') near Grimma, where her maternal aunt was a nun. Von Bora's presence is in the financial accounts of 1509/10.

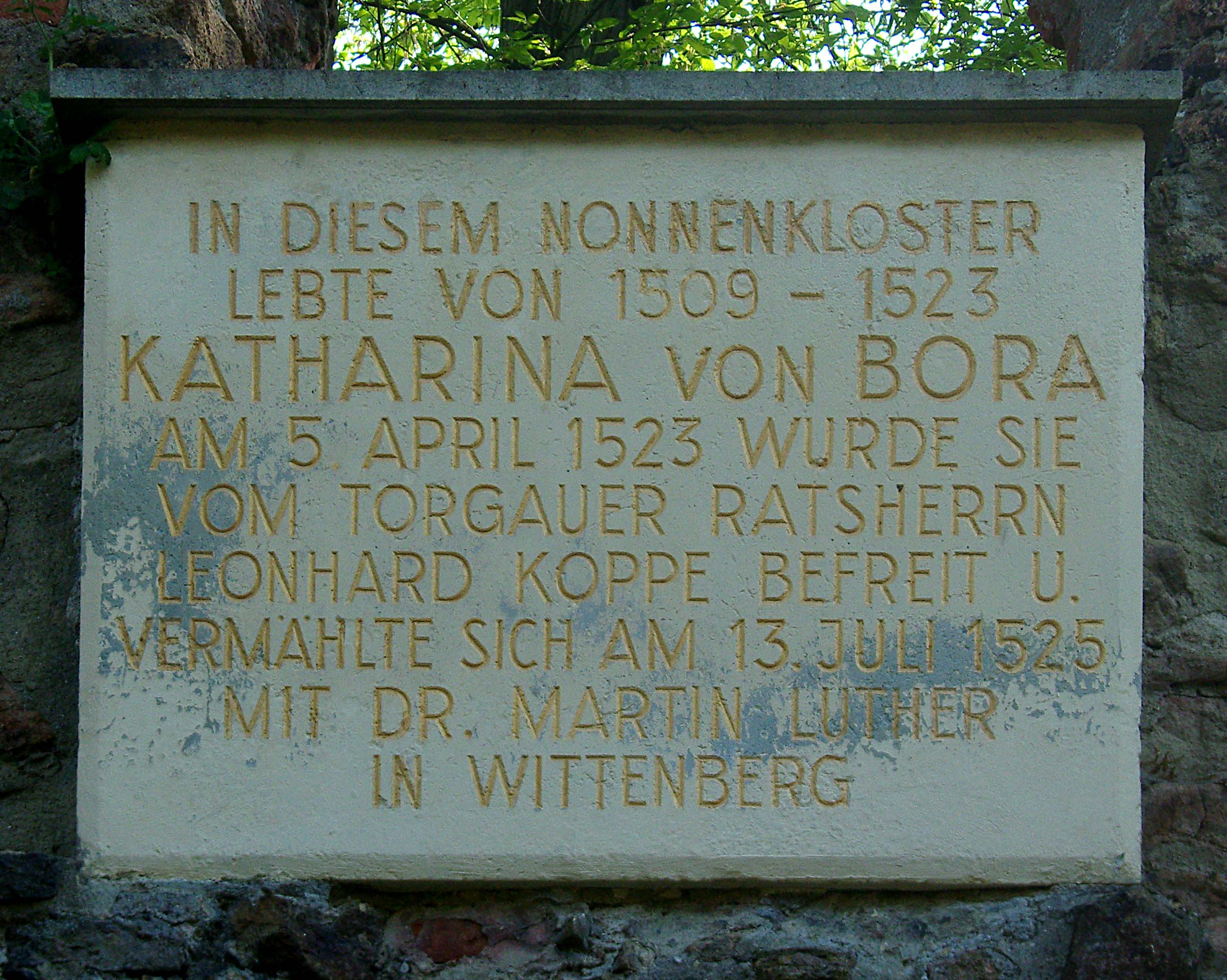
Plaque on the ruins of Nimbschen Abbey, commemorating von Bora's time there and her escape.

After years of being a nun, von Bora became interested in the growing reform movement and grew dissatisfied with cloistered life. Conspiring with several other sisters, she contacted Luther and begged for his assistance. On 4 April 1523, Holy Saturday, Luther sent Leonhard Köppe, a merchant and councillor of Torgau who regularly delivered herring to the convent. The nuns escaped by hiding in his covered wagon among the fish barrels, and fled to Wittenberg.

Luther asked the families of the nuns to admit them into their houses, but they declined, possibly because this would have made them accomplices to a crime under canon law.

Within two years, Luther was able to arrange marriages or find employment for all of the escaped nuns except von Bora. She was first housed with the family of Philipp Reichenbach, the municipal clerk of Wittenberg, then with Lucas Cranach the Elder and his wife, Barbara. Von Bora had a number of suitors, including Hieronymus Baumgartner from Nuremberg, and a pastor, Kaspar Glatz from Orlamünde, but none of the proposals resulted in marriage. She told Luther's friend and fellow reformer, Nicolaus von Amsdorf, that she would be willing to marry only Luther or von Amsdorf.

== Marriage to Luther ==
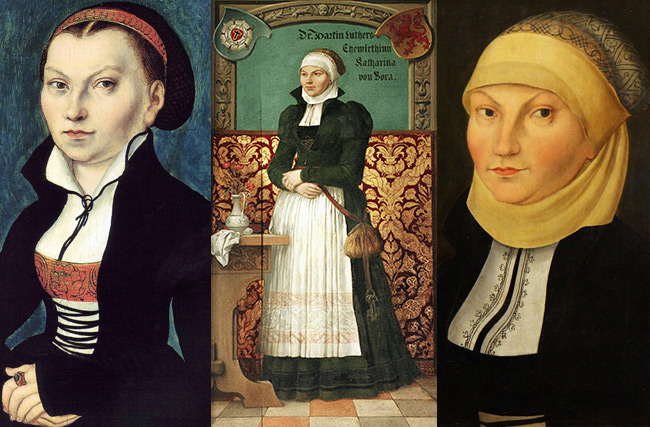
Three depictions of Katharina von Bora

Martin Luther, as well as many of his friends, was at first unsure of whether he should marry. Philip Melanchthon thought that this would hurt the Reformation by causing scandal. Luther eventually decided that his marriage would 'please his father, rile the pope, cause the angels to laugh, and the devils to weep'. 26-year-old Von Bora and 41-year-old Luther married on 13 June 1525, before witnesses including Justus Jonas, Johannes Bugenhagen, and Barbara and Lucas Cranach. A small wedding breakfast was held the next morning, and a more formal, public ceremony on 27 June, presided over by Bugenhagen.

The couple took up residence in the former dormitory and educational institution of Augustinian friars studying in Wittenberg (known as the 'Black Monastery'), a wedding gift from John, Elector of Saxony, brother of Luther's protector Frederick III, Elector of Saxony. Katharina immediately took on the task of managing the monastery's vast holdings. She bred and sold cattle and ran a brewery to provide for their family, the numerous students who boarded with them, and her husband's visitors. In times of epidemics, she operated a hospital with nurses, working alongside them. Luther called her the 'boss of Zulsdorf', after the farm they owned, and the 'morning star of Wittenberg' for her habit of rising at 4 a.m.

Based on Luther's descriptions, his wife, whom he nicknamed 'Herr Käthe', exerted much control over his life. She might have even influenced his decisions to a degree; Luther said that his wife 'convince[d] [him] of whatever' she pleased', and explicitly afforded her 'complete control' over the household, as long as 'his rights' were 'preserved', since '[f]emale government has never done any good'. She thus assisted her husband with running their estate and directed renovations when necessary. Anecdotal evidence suggests that Katharina Luther played a wife's role as taught by her husband's movement: she depended on him financially (although she also increased their estate's profits), and respected him as a 'higher vessel', always calling him 'Herr Doktor'. He reciprocated by occasionally consulting her on church matters.

Katharina bore six children: Hans (1526–1575), Elisabeth (1527–1528), Magdalena (1529–1542), Martin (1531–1565), Paul (1533–1593), and Margarete (1534–1570). She also suffered a miscarriage on 1 November 1539. The Luthers raised four orphaned children, including Katharina's nephew, Fabian.

=== Significance of the marriage ===
The marriage of von Bora to Luther is very important in the history of Protestantism, specifically in regard to the development of its views on marriage and gender roles. While Luther was not the first cleric to marry because of Reformation ideas, he was one of the most prominent. As he argued publicly for clerical marriage and produced much anti-Catholic propaganda, his marriage became a natural target for his enemies.

== After Luther's death ==
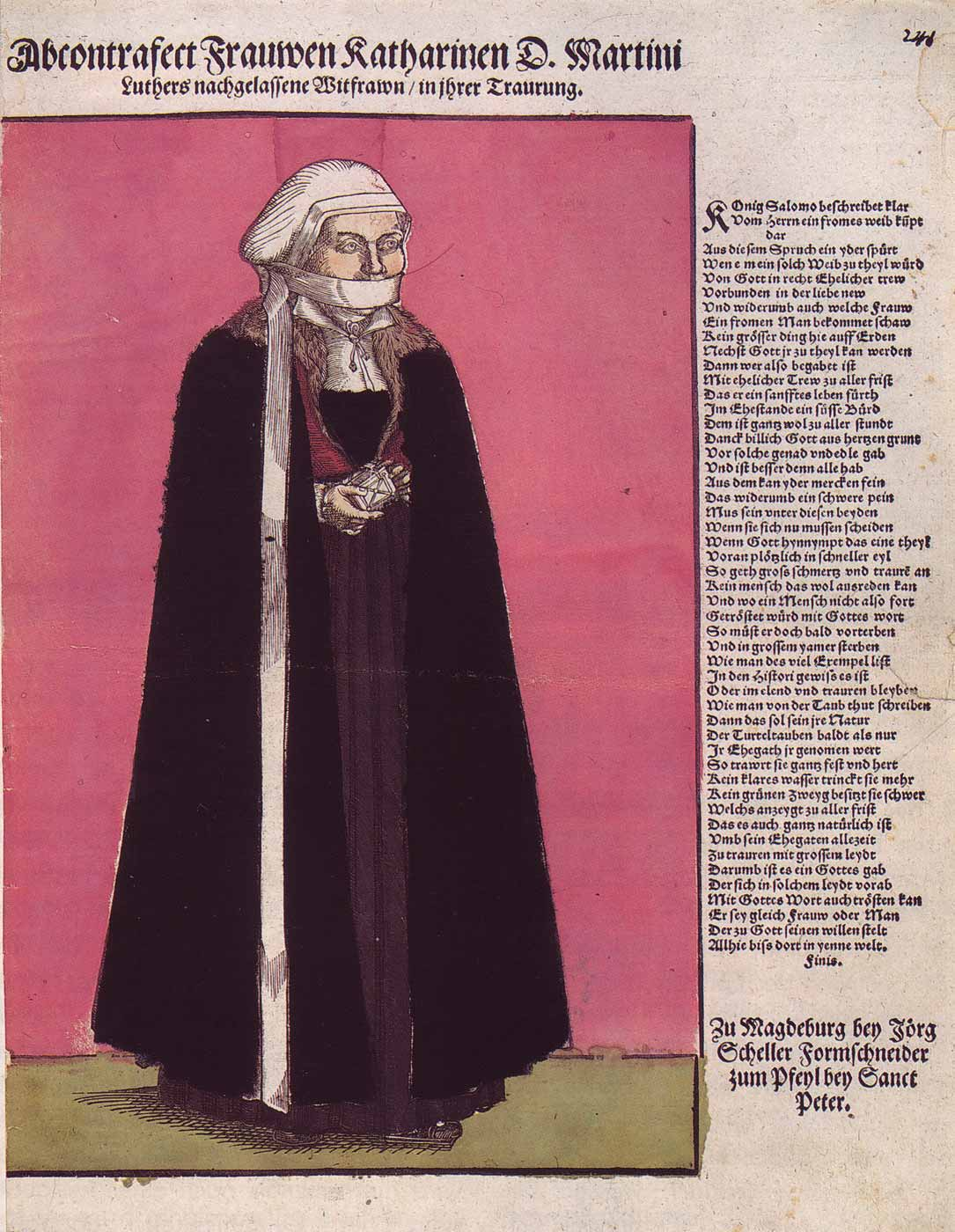
von Bora in 1546

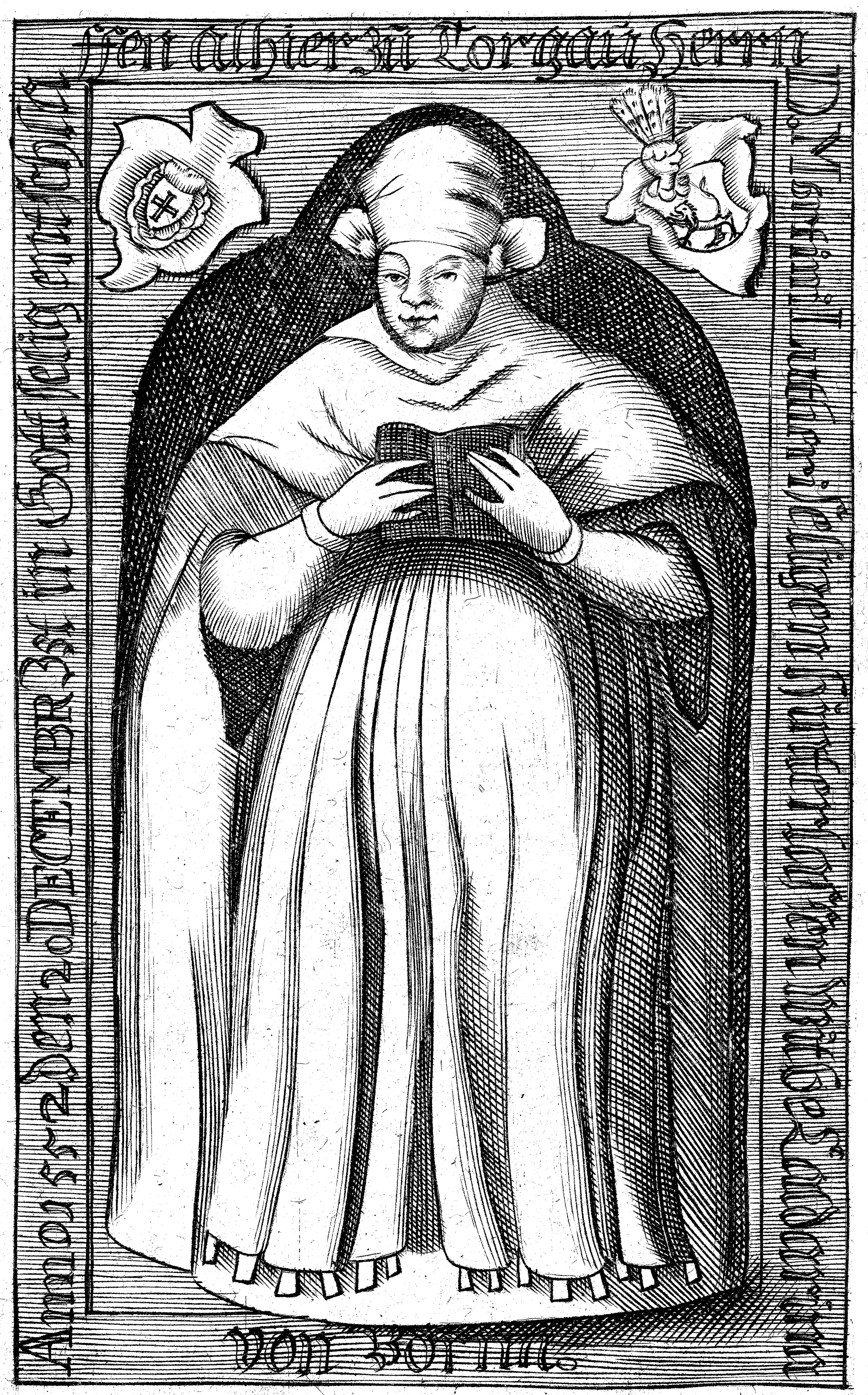
von Bora's gravestone engraving at Saint Mary's Church in Torgau, Germany

When Martin Luther died in 1546, Katharina was left in difficult financial straits without Luther's salary as professor and pastor, even though she owned land, properties, and the Black Cloister (now called Lutherhaus). She had been counselled by Martin Luther to move out of the old abbey and sell it after his death, and move into much more modest quarters with the children who remained at home, but she refused. Luther had named her his sole heir in his last will. His will could not be executed, however, because it did not conform with Saxon law.

Almost immediately after, Katharina had to leave the Black Cloister by herself at the outbreak of the Schmalkaldic War, fleeing to Magdeburg. After she returned, the approaching war forced another flight in 1547, this time to Braunschweig. In July 1547, at the close of the war, she was able to return to Wittenberg.

After the war, the buildings and lands of the monastery had been torn apart and laid waste. Cattle and other farm animals had been stolen or killed. Financially, they could not remain there. Katharina was able to support herself thanks to the generosity of John Frederick I, Elector of Saxony, and the princes of Anhalt.

She remained in Wittenberg in poverty until 1552, when an outbreak of the Black Plague and a harvest failure forced her to leave the city once again. She fled to Torgau, where she was thrown from her cart into a watery ditch near the city gates. For three months, she went in and out of consciousness, before dying in Torgau on 20 December 1552, at the age of 53. She was buried at Torgau's Saint Mary's Church, far from her husband's grave in Wittenberg. She is reported to have said on her deathbed, 'I will stick to Christ as a burr to cloth.'

By the time of Katharina's death, the surviving Luther children were adults. After Katharina's death, the Black Cloister was sold back to the university in 1564 by his heirs.

Margareta Luther, born in Wittenberg on 27 December 1534, married into a noble, wealthy Prussian family, to Georg von Kunheim (Wehlau, 1 July 1523 – Mühlhausen [now Gvardeyskoye, Kaliningrad Oblast], 18 October 1611, the son of Georg von Kunheim [1480–1543] and wife Margarethe, Truchsessin von Wetzhausen [1490–1527]) but died in Mühlhausen in 1570 at the age of thirty-six.

== Commemoration ==
Katharina von Bora is commemorated on 20 December in the Calendar of Saints of some Lutheran churches in the United States. In 2022, she was officially added to the Episcopal Church liturgical calendar with a feast day on 20 December.

She is further commemorated with a statue in Wittenberg, several biographies, and a biographical opera.
