= Katharina von Bora (opera) =

Katharina von Bora is a non-religious opera in three acts about the life of Katharina von Bora, wife of Martin Luther, written by conductor and composer Mihai Valcu, lyrics by Bill Zeiger. It premiered on November 7, 2015, at the Will W. Orr Auditorium at Westminster College in New Wilmington, Pennsylvania, as a collaboration between New Castle Lyric Opera and Opera Westminster.

The opera portrays Katharina von Bora as a woman of extraordinary courage, resourcefulness, and intelligence in a time when women had few rights and little recognition. It treats Luther neutrally, as a man of affairs. It does not seek to make a religious statement, but to spotlight the blossoming of a strong woman in a dark era.

Women in the sixteenth century had no independent legal standing, a setting which made it unlikely for any woman to achieve prominence. The opera describes von Bora's life beginning with her consignment to a convent at the age of five and chronicles her eventual departure from holy orders, her improbable marriage to Luther, their love, the birth of their children, her successful management of Luther's estate, and her struggle to maintain their family after his death. It dramatizes Katharina's support of her husband in his teaching and his political embroilment and her creation of a thriving and loving home even while beset by disease, the attacks of Luther's enemies, and the turbulence of the times. Katharina von Bora is today an admired historical figure in Germany, with a statue in Wittenberg and memorabilia in her honor.

== Historical context ==
Katharina von Bora strives to portray its historical period (1504–52) accurately – conditions within the convent and outside of it; the societal life of Saxony; two of three epidemics of black plague over Europe; the German Peasants' War of 1524–1525 and Luther's attitude towards it; the life of the Luther family in the Black Cloister, where students paid to come and eat; theological debates over Protestant ideas like free will and salvation – the opera touches on all these contemporary realities.

Composer Valcu, a permanent resident of the U.S. as well as of Germany, researched archives for three years before he began this work, spending time in Wittenberg, Grimma, and Torgau, where the action of the opera takes place.

== Marriage ==
Although von Bora and Luther were not much in love when they married, they grew to love each other. Luther's bachelor lifestyle did not meet von Bora's standards, and she took his domestic affairs in hand.

A sign of the love that grew up between them, Luther's will declared complete trust in Katharina to care for their children, even in the event that she should remarry. This uncommon faith in his wife – not only unconventional, but technically illegal in the sixteenth century – distinguishes this marriage from all the others which we know of at the time.

== Roles ==
Because the opera describes von Bora's entire life, many people appear in the performance, some only briefly. Therefore, one singer/actor can assume several roles. Performers may also be brought in from the opera house chorus.

Roles, voice types, cast
Role	Voice type	Original cast
Principal
Katharina	lyric soprano, wide range	Danielle Smith
Luther	tenor	William Andrews
Supporting
Five Companion Nuns: Anna, Ava, Elgard (/Margarethe), Frieda, Hilde (/Magdalene)	mezzo, soprano II, soprano I, alto, mezzo	Lauren Faber, Lauren Thayer, Rhiannon Griffiths, Rachel Read, Erin Warren
Katharina's father/A. von Anhalt	baritone	David Pratt
Katharina as a child	(child's voice)	Meghan Vance
Sophie/Barbara Cranach	soprano	Becca Bly
Tante Lenchen	mezzo-soprano	Ariana O'Donnell
Hieronymous	tenor	Victor Cardamone
Nicholas von Amsdorf	baritone	Mark Hockenberry
Johannes Bugenhagen	tenor	William Ambert
Minor
Lucas Cranach	baritone	David Osorno
Leonhard von Köppe	tenor	Thomas Ewan
Chancellor Gregor Brück	baritone	Matthew Benzenhoefer
Melanchthon/Hans/Paul/Student	tenor II/baritone	Joseph Spurio
Dr. Johannes Apel	bass	John Bonomo
Christian II of Denmark/Student	baritone	Matthew Younger
Johann, Elector of Saxony/Old servant	bass	Mark Doerr
Mother Superior	mezzo-soprano	Katherine Leihgeber
Sister Maria/Hannah Schurf	mezzo-soprano	Lynn Rodemoyer
Walpurga Bugenhagen	alto	Samantha Connell
Adjutant/Doctor/Student	tenor	Kendall Williams
Cióban/Student	tenor/baritone	Zachary Balog
Constantin/Herr Axt/Student	tenor/baritone	Jeremy Roberts
Luther children	(spoken)	Ella Vance, Nora Ball, Jacob Vance
Abbot	baritone	Samuel Barbara
Chef	(spoken)	Charles Wiley
Acolytes	(spoken)	Ella Vance, Jacob Vance

- Stage director: Anne Hagan Bentz
- Choir director: Samuel Barbara
- Choreographer: Rachel Read
- Nun jury: Katherine Leihgaber, Sylvia Ewen, Kathryn Mansell, Lynn Rodemoyer, Samantha Connell, Susan Speer
- Monk chorus for Easter eve celebration: Zachary Balog, Mark Hockenberry, David Osorno, Jeremy Roberts, Joseph Spurio, Charles Wiley, Kendall Williams, Matthew Younger, Matthew Benzenhoefer, John Bonomo, Thomas Ewen
- Dancers: Abbey Arrigo, Alexis Arrigo, Angela Colella, Sarah Jackson, Lauren Faber, Rachel Read, Chris Bezek, Patrick Raymond, Christian Na, James Helwig, Zach Balog, Joseph Spurio
- Student-guitarist: Robert Kushner
- Rehearsal pianist: Marie Libal-Smith

== Synopsis ==
=== Act 1 ===
Germany 1504–1523 within the walls of Cloister Marienthron in Nimbschen

When Katharina is five, shortly after the death of her mother, her father takes her to a convent and tenderly consigns her to the nuns for care, which he can no longer provide. From this time forward she is taken care of by her aunt, Tante Lenchen, who is also a nun. At the convent, a young nun, Sophie, befriends the child. However, when the Mother Superior learns that Sophie is pregnant, Sophie must say a hasty farewell to young Katharina and suffer a severe punishment, which the child Katharina unfortunately witnesses. Years later, as a young woman, Katharina discovers a pamphlet written by firebrand Martin Luther. The pamphlet urges monks and nuns to leave their cloisters, marry and take up secular lives. It circulates among other nuns in the convent, and six of them, evading the scrutiny of the Mother Superior, plot an escape. The daring escape, with the help of an agent of Luther, occurs during an Easter-eve ceremony.

=== Act 2 ===
Lutherstadt Wittenberg 1523–1525

The six runaway nuns are brought to Wittenburg, where, at a party in their honor, Katharina tells the story of their flight. The visiting King of Denmark, attending the party, presents Katharina with a ring in recognition of her courage as leader of the escape plot. Later at the party, Katharina and one of the guests, Hieronymus Baumgartner, an alumnus of Wittenberg University, profess their love for each other. Their courtship is secretly observed by an enemy of Luther's, Bishop Adolf von Anhalt. Hieronymus leaves Wittenberg to return home and ask his father's permission to marry Katharina; but Hieronymus never returns, and Katharina languishes. In the meantime, husbands and places in society have been found for all the other nuns; only Katharina remains without. A friend of Luther's, Nikolaus von Amsdorf, coaxes Katharina out of her melancholy and urges her to accept another man as her husband. She declares that she will now marry only Luther himself. To the amazement of Luther and his friends, this marriage makes sense, and Act II concludes with their festive wedding.

=== Act 3 ===
1525–1552 Inside the Wittenberger Black Cloister; 1552, Torgau

Katharina and Luther take up domestic life in the Black Cloister, a former monks' dormitory given to them by the Elector of Saxony as a wedding gift. There they host students for meals and discussion, and their love grows with the birth of their first child. Black Plague comes to Europe and many of their neighbors flee Wittenburg; but Katharina and Luther agree to remain and turn their home into a hospital. One of the sick who comes to their home for aid is that same Bishop von Anhalt who helped to wreck Katharina's early love affair. She recognizes him, but treats him, forgiving her enemy. Humbled by her kindness, he regrets his earlier cruelty. A luncheon at the Black Cloister welcomes students from distant Transylvania. Also present at this luncheon is a local official, Chancellor Gregor Brück. As usual, talk turns to religious matters, and Katharina voices shrewd opinions. The freedom of her speech and the deference that Luther shows her offend Brück, and he leaves abruptly. The couple's domestic affairs prosper, but a tragic event darkens their happiness when their daughter, Magdalena, falls sick, and her death grieves them deeply. Luther must continue his political and religious activities, which entail much travel, leaving Katharina to look after the children and household. They exchange letters during his absence, and their love remains strong. During one of his journeys, Katharina has a premonition of Luther's death and shortly thereafter she receives a report that he has actually passed away. She arranges for his funeral and for the continued care of her children, but Chancellor Brück rejects the will Luther has written and makes other arrangements for the children. Katharina defies him. Plague returns to Wittenberg. Katharina tries to remain, but soon must flee to neighboring Torgau. On the way, her wagon fails and the entire family are flung out. Katharina manages to save her children, but she herself is badly hurt. They are taken to a nearby house, where the children tell their rescuers that their injured mother is Luther's wife, and a doctor is called. The children urge Katharina to rest and recover. Realizing that she is dying, however, Katharina reminisces on her zest for life, on what is yet undone, and on the injustices of the world. She prays for her children's well-being. Looking forward to reunion with Luther and professing her belief in God, she passes away.

== Critical response ==
"What sets this work above many others are the absolutely beautiful, soaring, unforgettable melodies. These melodies seem to have been the very essence of the characters that sang them ... I was instantly captivated ... It was vibrant, logically conceived ... The story unfolded at a quick dramatic pace and [in] a quite believable manner ... During the poignant final scene, as Katharina is dying I thought to myself, 'What is this running down my cheeks?' It was tears!"

== Lyricists ==
When Valcu was ready with the concept of his opera, he started to look for a librettist, first in Germany and then in the U.S., but although he found two American writers willing, each of them gave up. Through a circle of common friends in New Castle, Pennsylvania, the composer then met Bill Zeiger. Zeiger began working on the libretto in June 2013. The work went through many drafts. He completed the current script just in time for the premiere on November 7, 2015. The collaboration between the two was ideal. Valcu uses "spiritual terms of praise" for Zeiger's ability.

== List of musical numbers ==
Title	Performed by
Act 1
Father's Aria	Father, with Young Katharina, Tante Lenchen, Sophie, Frieda, Mother Superior, Nun Jury
Sophie's Aria	Sophie
Torture Scene/Plan to Escape	Mother Superior, sophie, sister Maria, Tante Lenchen, Nun Jury, Ave, Elgard, Anna, Frieda, Hilde, Katharina, Köppe
Yes, Herr Köppe	Luther, Köppe, Old Servant, Five Young Nuns, Katharina, Mother Superior, Tante Lenchen, Abbott, Monks and Nuns
Easter Night Escape	Ensemble
Act 2
Welcome Party for Nuns	Elgard, Ave, Barbara Walpurga, Cranach, Amsdorf, Melanchthon, Else, Hieronymous, King Christina II of Denmark, Announcer, Chorus
Escape Song	Ensemble
Anthem	King Christian II of Denmark, Katharina, Ensemble
Chorus' Exit	Luther, Amsdorf, Cranach, Bugenhagen, Chorus
Love Duet	Katharina, Hieronymous, Bishop Adolf Köthen von Anhalt, Adjutant
Bishop Adolf Köthen von Anhalt	Katharina, Hieronymous, Bishop Adolf Köthen von Anhalt, Adjutant
Don't Cry Any More	Katharina, Amsdorf
Wedding	Ave, Hilde, Anna, Frieda, Katharina, Melanchthon, Apel, Cranach, Amsdorf, Luther, Bugenhagen, Duke Johann-Elector of Saxony, Chorus
Act 3
Domestic Life	Katharina, Margarethe, Tante Lenchen, Ave, Elgard, Hilde
Black Plague	Katharina, Barbara, Walpurga, Ave, Else, Hanna, Tante Lenchen, Adolf
Lunch at Luthers'	Katharina, Luther, Tante Lenchen, Students, Constantin, Cioban, Brück
Magdalena's Death	Magdalena, Katharina, Luther, Tante Lenchen
Traveling	Katharina, Luther, Children, Tante Lenchen, Ballet pantomime
News of Luther's Death	Katharina, Tante Lenchen, Hans, Brück, Cranach, Children
Finale	Paul, Margarethe, Katharina, Doctor, Choir

== Style ==
Valcu's work can be called a "pop opera" because it combines the deep seriousness of opera with the popular appeal of musical theater. It includes pop voices along with classically trained opera singers and pop instruments among the operatic orchestra. Some of the arias are composed as "songs" – written in a lower register than for classical singers, and conforming to pop music.

Despite its contemporary features, however, Katharina von Bora remains firmly rooted in the classical tradition. In such a work, modern compositional techniques like post-tonal or atonal scales do not intrude; time-proven and period specific tones prevail. In the score, the composer asks expressly that the staging of the work be done traditionally, never in a modern or abstract way. Like all Grand Opera, this opera presents its spectacle through elaborate costumes and sets, a large-scale cast, and an orchestra in a classic, conventional style and is based on historical events. This style excludes from the start ultra-modern musical techniques. The goal of the composer is to bring together in the concert hall opera and pop music lovers, old and young people, women and men alike, people of all religions and confessions.

== Opera vs. musical ==
Although viewers may think of it as a musical, Katharina von Bora is fundamentally a grand opera and not a musical. Classical opera originated in Italy in the late sixteenth century. The modern musical arose in the United States in the late nineteenth century. Both opera and the musical use music, dialogue, acting, make-up, scenery, costumes, dance, and technological effects to produce an impression. In operatic tradition, however, the music is primary; in the musical, words are primary.

In the musical, the orchestra frequently falls silent while characters engage in dialogue on stage. The orchestra punctuates the action, highlights key moments, and provides transition. In opera, however, a halt in the music is rare. The opera achieves its effect through the sustained movement of musical texture.

In the musical the words of songs are clearly articulated and understood. In opera, even when words are not understood, the impact of the drama comes home. The onward flow of music in the opera joins together all the action and all the meaning of the work.

Classical opera also typically portrays events on a grand scale, while the musical, though it may be opulent, likes a natural human frame of reference.

Through the magic of theatre, the musical may lure the audience into a fantasy world where anything can happen. Dreams may come true, or almost come true, and deeply stir the emotions of audiences who share and appreciate those dreams. But in the end, they are the dreams of ordinary people. The opera, on the other hand, like Greek epic, envisions not dreams, but the transcendent nobility of human aspirations. It bears a gravitas beyond the range of common human activity. It inspires a sense of fated effects, of actions imbued with fantastic powers. And so the opera attempts to elevate its audience beyond rational boundaries into a heroic realm described and sustained by music.

Katharina von Bora is opera in the classic sense.

== Influences ==
Musical associations with the opera's historical time and place permeate its composition. References to the Renaissance and Reformation inevitably appear, notably including folkloric elements from the works of contemporary composer Michael Praetorius. The music of Handel, who grew up in Saxony the century after Katharina and Luther, also influences the work.

== Instrumentation ==
The orchestra pit for Katharina von Bora contains two separate orchestras; one classical and one pop. They never play separately. When the moment requires a special pop-style color, the composer, who made the whole orchestration, uses both groups of musicians. However, after the premiere, the pop orchestra was concentrated and reduced.

The classical orchestra includes violin I and II, viola, cello, double bass, two flutes (piccolo), two oboes (English horn), two clarinets, bass clarinet, two bassoons, four French horns, two trumpets, three trombones, tuba, timpani, two percussionists playing bells, tom-tom, triangle, xylophone, vibraphone, and harp.

The scaled-down "pop orchestra" consists of guitar (classical, electric) for solo and harmony, synthesizer, two descant recorders (played by real descant recorder players but whose music is also written in the flautists' notes and in synthesizer notes, to make options available), piano, bass guitar, and drum set.

== Classical and "pop" voices ==
The vocal register for which Katharina's and especially Luther's music was composed is not strictly the one in which the classical soprano or classical tenor voice sounds the best. In order to accommodate both classical and pop voice styles, these parts are written for voices of a wider range. Even classically trained singers need to have a "pop timbre and color" in their voices.

In Katharina von Bora we can find an infusion of pop style. Many melodic lines and harmonies evoke the simplicity of pop concert songs. Often during the performance, we hear modern rhythms of "light" music. In some songs we feel a strong beat which is very seldom found in classical music where the beat is more discrete and delicate, but clearer. However, the very complex orchestration determines the nature of the opera.

== Artistic license ==
While remaining true to the details of Katharina's life, the opera takes dramatic license in retelling her story in the following ways:

- Nimbschen was not the first cloister where Katharina was brought as a child by her father. Prior to this, she was at the Benedictine cloister in Brehna.
- In the opera, six women escape from the convent. Historically, twelve women participated in this escape.
- The aria for Sophie as well as Bishop Adolf von Anhalt's sickness are inventions.
- In the opera, Katharina's wedding to Luther takes place only once. In reality there were "two wedding meetings"; on June 13, 1525, with a small circle of friends and so by Luther called "Wirtschaft," a more formal wedding and marriage feast which took place on June 27, 1525.
- On stage, Johann, the Elector of Saxony, gives the couple the Black Cloister at their wedding. In reality, although the couple probably lived in the Black Cloister from the time of their marriage, Johann formally gave them the building almost seven years later, on February 4, 1532.
- Luther's final departure on a business journey in 1546 is not real. He actually left Wittenberg for Zulsdorf in 1545, having fallen out with the people of Wittenberg.
- The text of the postal correspondence between Luther and Katharina in 1546 is invented. The letters of Katharina are lost, and we have today only six letters of Luther to Katharina, although it is known that they wrote each other frequently.
- In the opera's final act, Luther says goodbye to all his children. In reality, his boys went with Luther. Only Margarete remained in Wittenberg.
- At the end of the opera, Katharina dies within a few hours of her accident. In reality, she died about two and a half months later from an injury sustained in the accident.

== Running time ==
Without any cuts, the entire opera lasts three hours. In six of the twenty numbers, a verse may be cut, which can shorten the running time to two and a half hours.

== Translation ==
Originally performed in English, the libretto of this opera has been translated into German by Thomas Mittmann.
