= Mojsej Ignjatović =

Serbian educator, writer, and translator (1777–1842)

- Мојсеј Игњатовић
- Born: 1777; Vukovar, Syrmia County, Habsburg Monarchy
- Died: 1842 (aged 64–65)
- Education: Teacher's College, Pécs
- Occupations: Writer, educator, translator, dramatist
- Employer(s): Third Public School, Novi Sad
- Writing career
- Language: Serbian
- Years active: 1802–1839
- Notable works: Артелло придворный шальивчина, Библіотека образованя дечіег

Mojsej Ignjatović (Serbian Cyrillic: Мојсеј Игњатовић; 1777–1842) was a Serbian polymath, writer, educator, translator, dramatist, and high school professor. He is known for his contributions to children's literature and early Serbian secular education.

== Biography ==
Ignjatović was born in Vukovar (at the time in Syrmia County, Kingdom of Slavonia) and was educated in the best Austro-Hungarian schools of that period, first in Osijek and after in Pécs, where he graduated from a Teacher's College. Upon graduating in 1802, Mojsej Ignjatović began his professional career as a teacher and professor in Novi Sad, remaining active until 1839. During this period, he organized school theater performances and translated several plays, including Artello, pridvorni šaljivčina, a theatrical play in three acts by Karl von Eckartshausen in 1813.

Mojsej Ignjatović, in 1817, on a school certificate from that time, is called primae grammatices classis professor (first-class grammar teacher). From this, we conclude that the Serbian national elementary school in Novi Sad was being upgraded to the status of a high school where Ignjatović taught. During the last days of October of the same year, he would organize plays for the local audience, using his students as actors in the performances. He would translate the play from either German or Hungarian and have his students choose the character they wished to play.

In 1826, Ignjatović became the acting superintendent of Eastern Orthodox schools in Srem and in Slavonia.

== Works ==
- Артелло придворный шальивчина: позориштна игра у три дѣйствія — Serbian translation of a theatrical play in three acts by Karl von Eckartshausen (1752–1803), titled Artello, the Court Prankster, translated by Mojsej Ignjatović in 1813.
- Библіотека образованя дечіег: у приповедкама, баснама, позоришнима играма ради побуђиваня ко добродѣтельи, и отвраћаня од порока (Library of Children's Education: in Stories, Fables, and Theatrical Plays for the Purpose of Inspiring Virtue and Deterring Vice) — a compilation of translated works by Kampe, Saltzmann, Roh, Weiss, Glatz, and Christoph von Schmid. The collection was translated, edited, and presented by Mojsej Ignjatović of the Novi Sad Gymnasium, and published in Buda in 1834 by the Slavonic-Serbian press of the Royal Hungarian University (Славено-србска печатња Краљевскаго всеучилишта венгерскаго).
- Панегирикон священѣйшем цесаро-кралѣвском и апостолическом величеству Францу I... / за знак поданическе благодарности и приверженія смиреним благоговѣйнством поднешен од Мойсеа Ігнятовића... (Panegyricon to His Sacred Imperial-Royal and Apostolic Majesty Francis I... as a sign of subject gratitude and devotion submitted by Mojsej Ignjatović) — published in Pest in 1835 by the University Press, sponsored by Matica srpska.
- Моисеа Игнятовића ПěснЬ блаженěйше памяти Францу I. Імператору АýстрійскомЪ и Кралю МађарскомЪ: ЧрезЪ ЮностЬ Школску пěвана и Два слова што самЪ у Сомбору о воспитанію, што самЪ у Руми, Вуковару и Осěку о Просвěщенію Дужностима Учителя говоріо (Mojsej Ignjatović's Song to the Blessed Memory of Franz I, Emperor of Austria and King of Hungary: Through Youth School Songs and Two Speeches — one delivered in Sombor on education, and another in Ruma, Vukovar, and Osijek on Enlightenment and the Duties of Teachers) — printed in Novi Sad by G. Pavel Jankov, C.K. Priv. Typography, in 1839.
