= Glotzer =

Glotzer is a surname. Notable people with the surname include:

- Albert Glotzer (1908–1999), American stenographer and socialist politician
- Sharon Glotzer, American scientist

== See also ==
- Glatzer
