= Glatzel =

Glatzel is a surname. Notable people with the surname include:

- John Glatzel (born 1979), American lacrosse player
- Paul Glatzel (born 2001), English footballer
- Robert Glatzel (born 1994), German footballer

== See also ==
- Glatzer
