= Joachim Deschler =

German sculptor and medalist (c. 1500–1571)

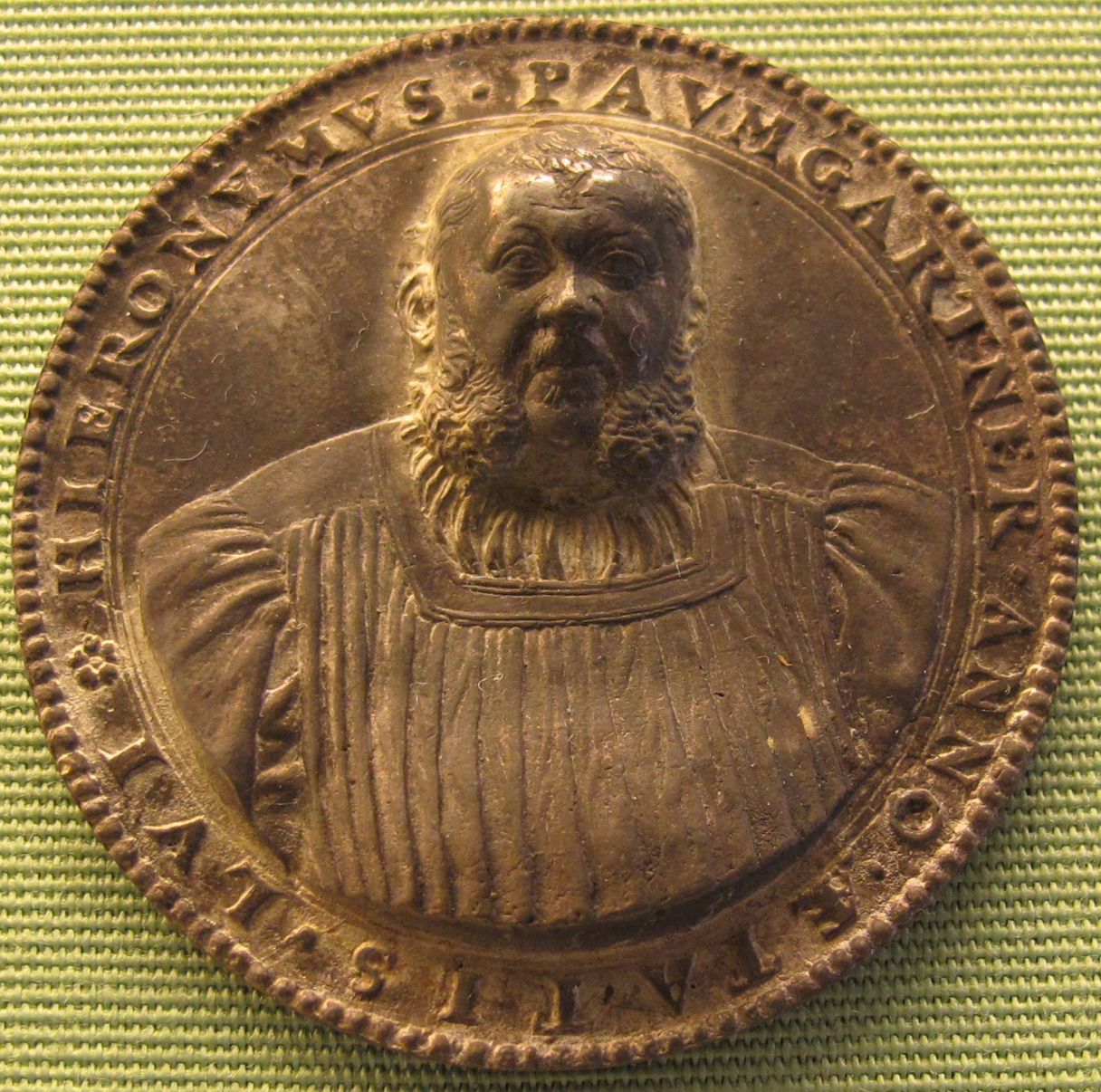
Medal of Hieronymus Baumgartner (1553), a major figure in the Nuremberg Reformation. It is notable for not being a profile.

Joachim Deschler (sometimes Joachim Teschler or, incorrectly, Johann Teschler; c.1500 - after 1 October 1571, Vienna) was a German sculptor and medalist.

== Life and work ==
Little is known about his life. The St. Lorenz Church Book states that he married his first wife in 1532 and his second wife (the widow of painter Nikolaus Glockendon) in 1537. That same year, he was granted full rights as a citizen of Nuremberg. There are no further details for the period 1533 to 1547, except that he studied in Italy for two years; mostly, it is thought, in Venice and Rome, returning with many drawings and sketches. Also, his first contacts with the Archduke Maximilian (later, Maximilian II), date from 1543. He was still a resident of Nuremberg in 1554, when his daughter by his first wife was married, but moved to Vienna sometime in the late 50s. It was there, in 1564, that he became Maximilian's Imperial Court Sculptor. The last record of his being paid a salary dates from 1 October 1571, so it is believed that he died later that year.

Deschler's workshop produced small sculptures made from limestone and boxwood in the German Renaissance style. He also produced a great number of artistically executed medals, which may be identified by the letters "ID" inscribed on the arm of the person depicted. The Coat of Arms on their reverse sides indicate that they were modelled with limestone from the Solnhofen quarries. Most of his medals were cast at the mint in Kremnitz. Although Deschler's work shows Italian influence, its genre-like nature marks it as distinctively German. After Hans Bolsterer, he is considered one of the greatest German medalists of that period.
