= Friedrich Wilhelm Bollinger =

German engraver (1777–1825)

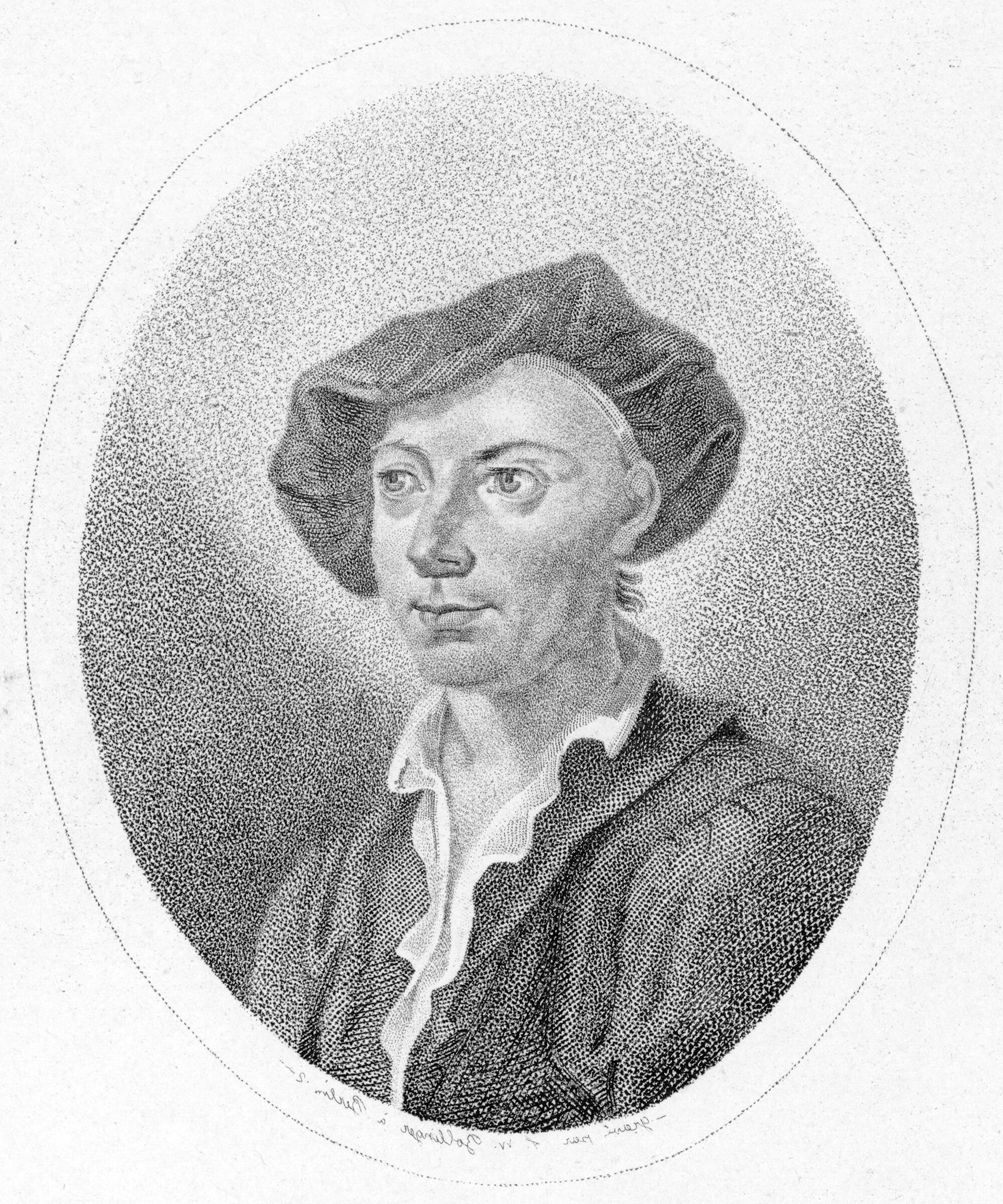
- Born: 6 February 1777; Berlin
- Died: 20 January 1825 (aged 47); Berlin

Friedrich Wilhelm Bollinger (6 February 1777, in Berlin – 20 January 1825, in Berlin) was a German engraver, best known for his copperplate portraits of Martin Luther, Johannes Bugenhagen, Georg Wilhelm Friedrich Hegel, and Pliny the Elder.
