= Paul Luther =

German physician, chemist, and third son of Martin Luther (1533–1593)

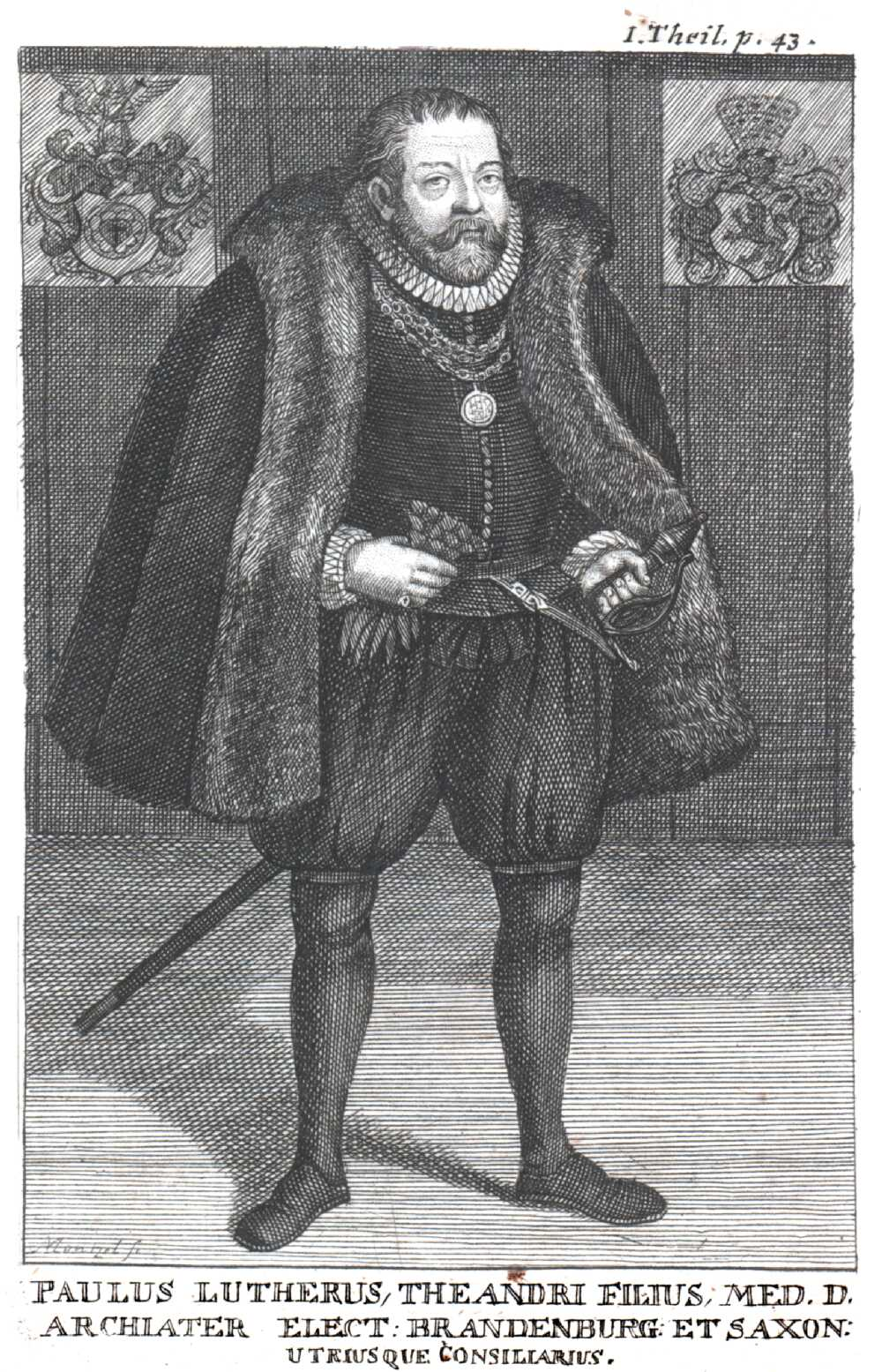
- Luther, contemporary wood engraving
- Born: 19 November 1533; Wittenberg, Electorate of Saxony, Holy Roman Empire
- Died: 8 March 1593 (aged 60); Leipzig, Electorate of Saxony, Holy Roman Empire
- Education: University of Wittenberg
- Occupations: Physician; medical chemist; alchemist
- Spouse: Anna Warbeck
- Children: 6
- Parents: Martin Luther; Katharina von Bora
- Family: Luther

Paul Luther (19 November 1533 – 8 March 1593) was a German physician, medical chemist, and alchemist. He was the third son of the German Protestant Reformer Martin Luther and was successively physician to John Frederick II, Duke of Saxony; Joachim II Hector, Elector of Brandenburg; Augustus, Elector of Saxony and his successor Christian I, Elector of Saxony. He taught alchemy to Anne of Denmark.

== Early life ==
Born at Wittenberg, the third son of Martin Luther by his marriage to Katharina von Bora, Luther was named after Saint Paul the Apostle and proved such an energetic child that his father said of him, "He is destined to fight against the Turks." The boy's education began with the study of Greek and Latin under Philip Melanchthon and Veit Winsheim.

In 1546, when Luther was twelve, his father died, leaving the family in straitened circumstances without Luther's salaries. At the outbreak of the Schmalkaldic War, they fled to Magdeburg and in 1547 to Brunswick. In July, at the end of the war, it was possible to return to Wittenberg, although in relative poverty. On the advice of Melanchthon, Luther attended the University of Wittenberg to study medicine.

In September 1552, an outbreak of the bubonic plague forced the Luther family to leave their home once again. They fled to Torgau, travelling in a cart which overturned near the city gates, seriously injuring Luther's mother. She died there on 20 December 1552. While in Torgau, on 5 February 1553, at the age of twenty, Luther married Anna, daughter of the translator Veit Warbeck (c. 1490–1534).

== Career ==
Returning to Wittenberg, Luther completed his medical studies and on 29 July 1557 gained the degree of Doctor of Medicine.

He turned down an offer to teach at the University of Jena because of his objections to the theology of Victorinus Strigel, a leading academic there. In religion, Luther was an enthusiastic Lutheran and zealously defended his father's teachings.

Luther took up a career as a physician. He became the personal physician of John Frederick II, Duke of Saxony, remaining at Gotha until the surrender of the city on 13 April 1567, to Augustus, Elector of Saxony. He was then in practice at the court of Joachim II Hector, Elector of Brandenburg until his death on 3 January 1571, and was subsequently physician to Augustus, Elector of Saxony, and his successor, Christian I, at Dresden. In 1590 he retired and took up residence at Leipzig.

Luther was also distinguished as a chemist and developed several drugs, such as Unguentum ex nitro, Magistrum perlarum, Magistrum collorum, and Aurum potabile, which were produced by the pharmacies of Saxony. He was interested in alchemy, the ultimate goal of which was the production of gold, and has been claimed as the most significant instructor of the amateur alchemist Anne of Denmark, Electress of Saxony.

Luther died at Leipzig on 8 March 1593. His funeral oration was given by his friend Matthias Dresser.

== Family ==
While still a medical student at Wittenberg, Luther had married Anna Warbeck. They were married for thirty-three years, until Anna's death at Dresden on 15 May 1586. From this marriage there were seven children:

- Paul Luther (1553–1558)
- Margarethe Luther (1555–1597), who married Simon Gottsteig
- Johannes Ernst Luther (1560–1637), who became canon of Zeitz. Through him, the male line of the Luther family continued until 1759.
- Johannes Friedrich Luther (1562–1599)
- Anna Luther (1564–1596), who married in Oberschaar Nicolaus Freiherr Marschall von Bieberstein
- Martin (1568)
- Johannes Joachim Luther (1569–1600)

== Publications ==
- Oratio de arte medica et cura tuendae valetudinis (published posthumously at Breslau, 1598)

== Primary sources ==
- Matthias Dresser, De vita et morte D. Pauli Lutheri medici (Leipzig, 1593)
