= Glatz =

Glatz may refer to:

- Glatz (district) (1742–1945), a Prussian district in Silesia
- Glatz Land, a historical region in southwestern Poland
- County of Kladsko (German: Grafschaft Glatz; 1459–1818), in the Kingdom of Bohemia and, later, the Kingdom of Prussia
  - Glatz (city), the German name of Kłodzko, Poland, and capital city of the historic county
- Glatz (surname)

== See also ==
- Glatze, a low-scoring playing card
