= Magdalena Luther =

Third child and second daughter of Martin Luther (1529–1542)

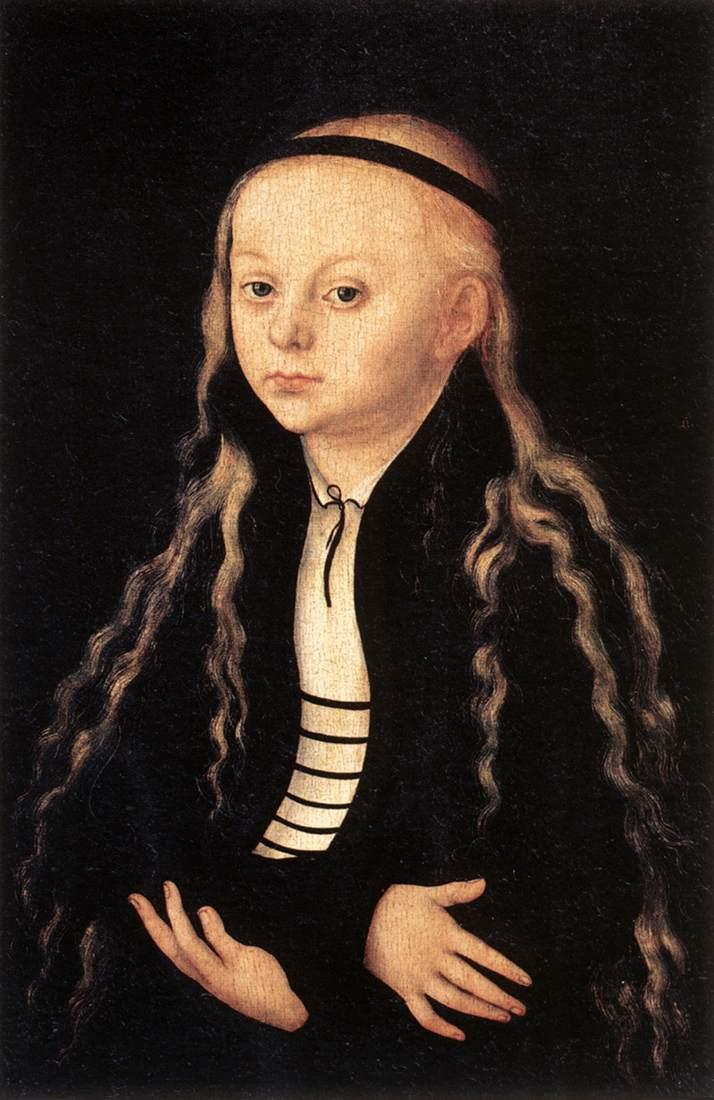
- A painting by Lucas Cranach the Elder
- Born: 4 May 1529; Wittenberg, Electorate of Saxony, Holy Roman Empire
- Died: 20 September 1542 (aged 13); Wittenberg, Electorate of Saxony
- Known for: Daughter of Martin Luther
- Parent(s): Martin Luther; Katharina von Bora

Magdalena Luther (4 May 1529 – 20 September 1542) was the third child and second daughter of German priest and iconic figure of the Protestant Reformation, Martin Luther and his wife, Katharina von Bora. She died at the age of thirteen.

== Life ==
Magdalena was born in Wittenberg as the couple's third child and second but first surviving daughter, as her older sister, Elisabeth, had died the year before Magdalena was born, at the age of seven months. Luther reported to Nicholas von Amsdorf that Katharina had gone into labour and after three hours, had been delivered, without any difficulties, of a perfectly healthy baby daughter. She was a much loved child and she was nicknamed Lenchen inside her family. Luther also asked Amsdorf to be godfather to "the said little heathen and to help her [enter] holy Christendom through the holy, precious sacrament of baptism. During the Diet of Augsburg, in 1530, Luther received a portrait of the one-year-old Magdalena from his wife and thanked her by offering suggestions for weaning that he had received from Argula von Grumbach, one of the few women whose writing in favour of the Protestant Reformation are extant.

== Death ==
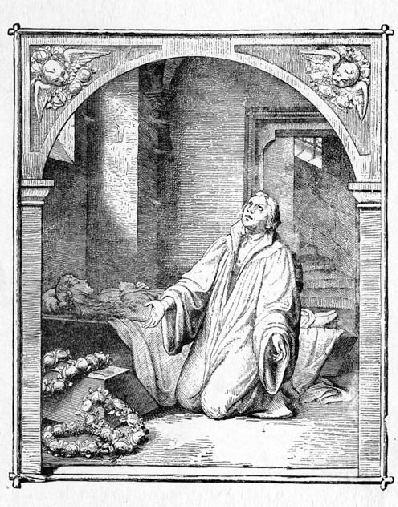
"The Death of Magdalena" from The Life of Martin Luther, the German Reformer, in Fifty Pictures by Gustav König (c.1853)

Magdalena died in Wittenberg in her father's arms after a prolonged illness. Luther's letters and Table Talk testify that the death of Magdalena was an extremely trying time for both her parents and her older brother Hans, who was summoned home to be with his sister at the very end. It was later written:

The beloved child, Magdalena, is sick. Her portrait, painted by Cranach, is seen still in the room where she was lying, a lovely child, with large eyes, clear and deep. Near the bed is now Luther, he prays: "I love her a lot, but good God, if your will is to take her, I will give her to you with great pleasure. Then, addressing her: My little Magdalena, my little girl, soon you will not be with me, will you be happy without your father? The tired child tenderly and softly answered: Yes, dear father, as God wants. Soon, we put her in the coffin. Luther looked Ah! Sweet Lenchen, he says, you will rise again and you will shine like a star, yes, like the sun! I am happy in the spirit, but my earthly form is very sad. You have learned, he wrote to Justus Jonas: I believe the report has reached you that my dearest daughter Magdalena has been reborn into Christ's eternal kingdom. I and my wife should joyfully give thanks for such a felicitous departure and blessed end by which Magdalena escaped the power of the flesh, the world, the Turk and the devil; yet the force of our natural love is so great that we are unable to do this without crying and grieving in our hearts, or even without experiencing death ourselves. The features, the words and the movements of the living and dying daughter remain deeply engraved in our hearts. Even the death of Christ... is unable to take this all away as it should. You, therefore, give thanks to God in our stead. For indeed God did a great work of grace when he glorified our flesh in this way. Magdalena had (as you know) a mild and lovely disposition and was loved by all... God grant me and all my loved ones and all my friends such a death – or rather such a life.

== Bibliography ==
- Hendrix, Scott H. (2010). Martin Luther: a very short introduction. Very Short Introductions. Oxford University Press. ISBN 978-0-19-957433-9.
