= Epistle to the English =

1526 book by John Bugenhagen

Epistle to the English was a 1526 book by John Bugenhagen, a close friend of Martin Luther. It was written to encourage English reformers.
