= Johannes Bugenhagen =

German Lutheran theologian and pastor (1485–1558)

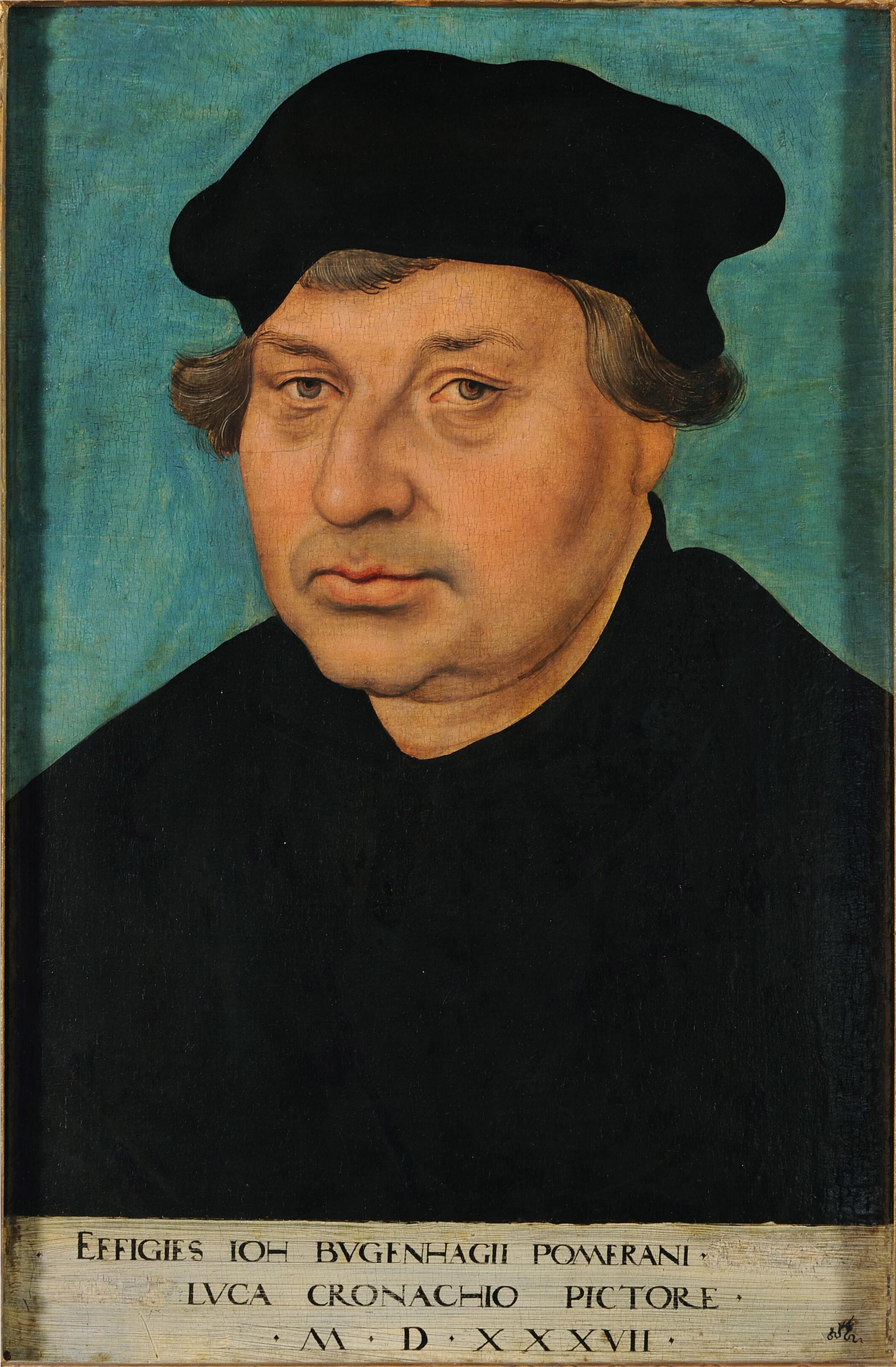
- Bugenhagen in 1537 by Lucas Cranach
- Born: 24 June 1485; Wollin, Pomerania, Holy Roman Empire (now Wolin, Poland)
- Died: 20 April 1558 (aged 72); Wittenberg, Saxony, Holy Roman Empire (now Germany)
- Occupations: Priest, Theologian
- Spouse(s): Walpurga Bugenhagen, maiden name unknown (13 October 1522)
- Children: Johannes (the Younger, 1531/2–1592, professor for theology at the University of Wittenberg); Martha; Sara
- Parent: Gerhard Bugenhagen
- Theological work
- Era: Reformation
- Tradition or movement: Lutheranism

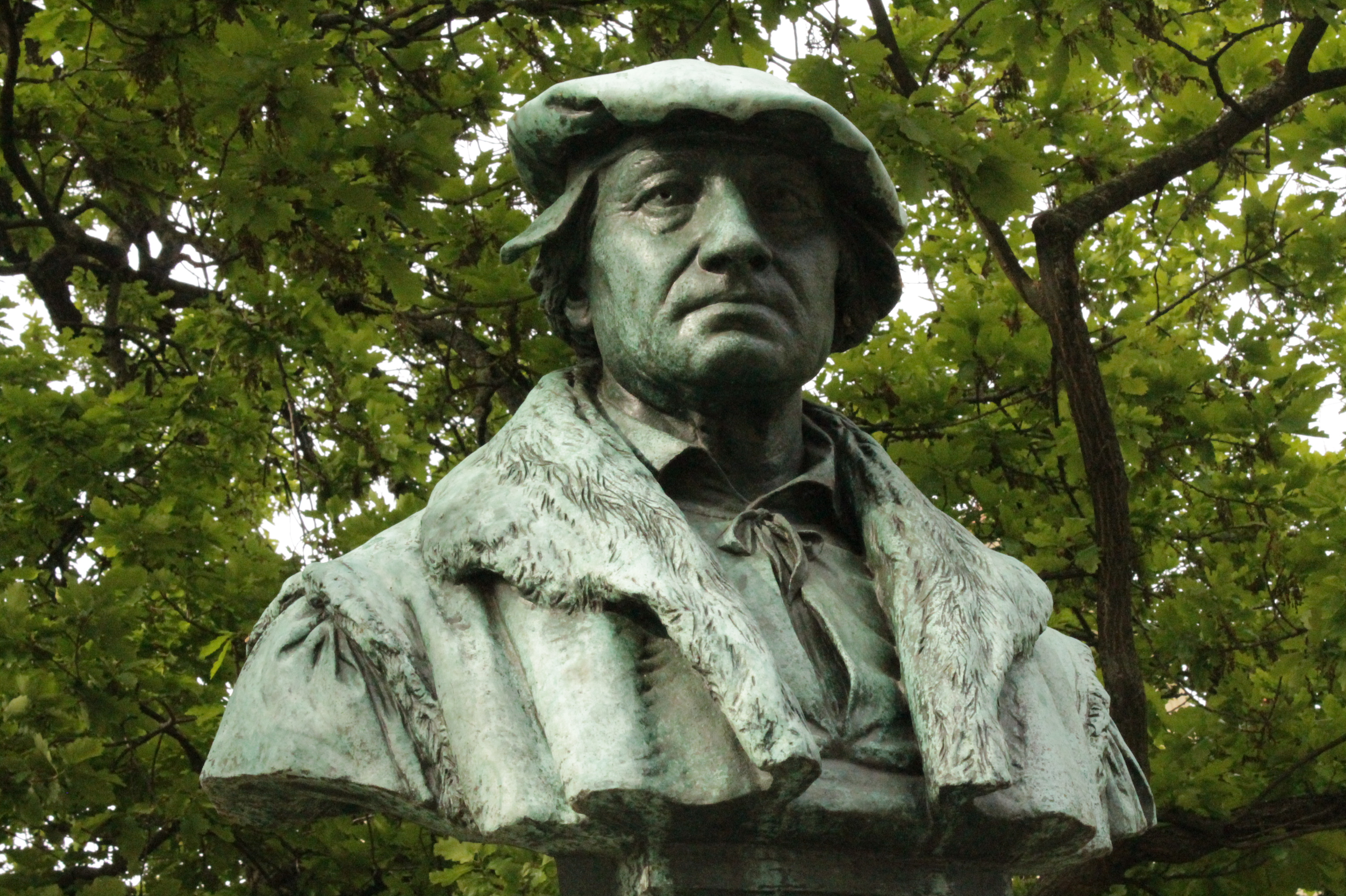
Statue of Johannes Bugenhagen, Kirchplatz, Wittenberg

Johannes Bugenhagen (24 June 1485 – 20 April 1558), also called Doctor Pomeranus by Martin Luther, was a German theologian and Lutheran priest who introduced the Protestant Reformation in the Duchy of Pomerania and Denmark in the 16th century. Contributions of Karlstadt and Luther to the translation of theology into social legislation were most fully realized by Bugenhagen. Among his major accomplishments was organization of Lutheran churches in Northern Germany and Scandinavia. He has also been called the "Second Apostle of the North".

Johannes Bugenhagen was pastor to Martin Luther at St. Mary's church in Wittenberg. He is also commemorated in the Calendar of Saints of the Lutheran Church–Missouri Synod as a pastor on 20 April.

== Biography ==
=== Early life ===
Bugenhagen was born in Wollin (now Wolin), Duchy of Pomerania, on 24 June 1485 as one of three children of local Ratsherr Gerhard Bugenhagen. From 1502 to 1504, he studied artes at the University of Greifswald. In 1504, he moved to Treptow an der Rega (now Trzebiatów) and became the rector of the local school. Though he had not studied theology, he was ordained as a priest at St. Mary's Church in Treptow in 1509, and served as a vicar at the Kanonikerkolleg of that church thereafter.

In 1517, abbot Johann Boldewan called Bugenhagen to serve as a Biblical lecturer at his nearby Belbuck Abbey, where the two became the core of a Humanist circle. Duke Bogislav X of Pomerania ordered Bugenhagen to write down the history of Pomerania in Latin. The year 1518 is the beginning of historical writing of the combined territory Pomerania.

Bugenhagen first encountered the theology of Luther in the reformer's Prelude on the Babylonian Captivity of the Church in 1520. At first he did not like Luther's thoughts at all. However, once he had studied it more, Bugenhagen became a supporter of the Reformation and moved to Wittenberg in 1521.

=== Wittenberg ===
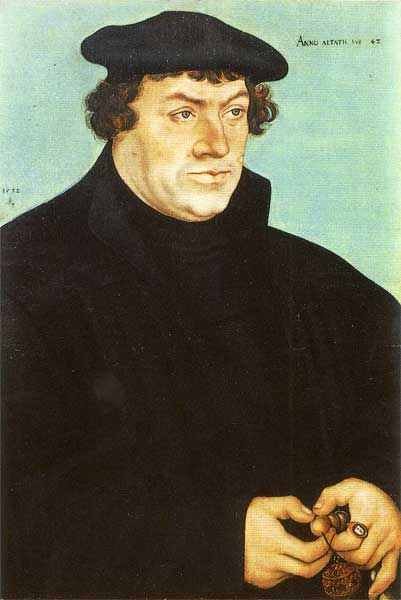
Johannes Bugenhagen by Lucas Cranach the elder 1532. Some assert that it depicts Christoph Ering (de), another Lutheran reformer.

In Wittenberg, Bugenhagen was elected parish pastor on 25 October 1523, making him Martin Luther's pastor and confessor. He was a member of Luther's team translating the Holy Bible from Greek and Hebrew to German, and opened the debate on Ulrich Zwingli's reforms.

By 1523, his private lectures had become well known, so he was called to lecture the following years at the Leucorea, the university in Wittenberg (today Martin Luther University). In March 1524 the printer Adam Petri of Basel printed his "Interpretations of the Psalms" (Lat.Librum Psalmorum interpretatio) in the Latin language. The cover was cut after a drawing by Hans Holbein the Younger depicting biographical events of David's life in relation to the New Testament. The book saw four further editions in the Latin language within half a year. A second edition by Adam Petri in August, one by Johannes Petreius in Nuremberg and also by Johannes Knobloch in Strassburg. Another one is assumed to have been printed by Johann Schöffer in Mainz. Two years later, a German translation was printed by Adam Petri in which for the Psalms text, the German translation by Martin Luther were used. Bugenhagen was regarded as one of the most important teachers and practitioners of biblical interpretation in the Wittenberg-centered Protestant Reformation, ordaining a generation of Lutheran pastors who were educated at this university.

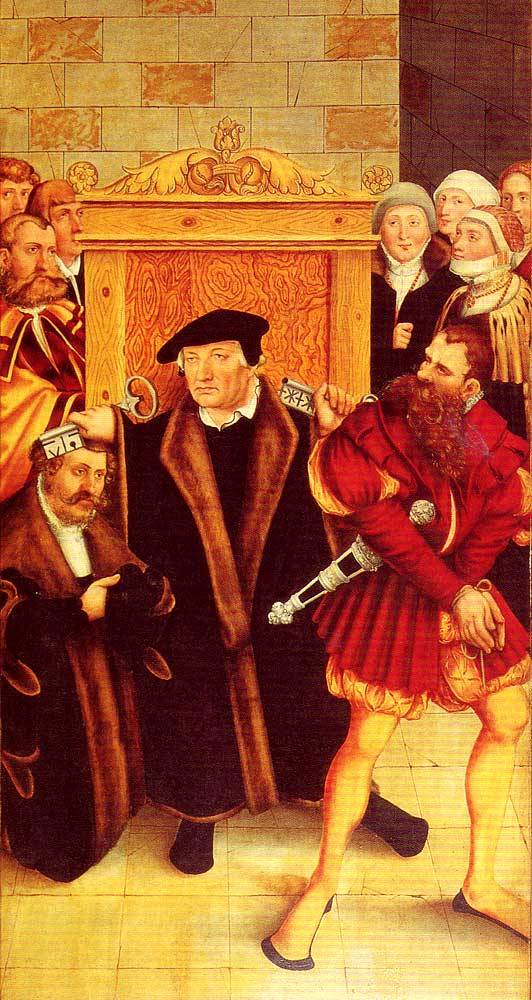
Die Predigt rechter Altarflügel der Vorderseite des Altars der Wittenberger Stadtkirche by Lucas Cranach the Elder. Note the keys of the kingdom in Bugenhagen's hands

On 17 March 1533, he was promoted doctor of theology at the university of Wittenberg, together with Johannes Aepinus and Kaspar Cruciger. The promotion was supervised by Martin Luther, based on Philipp Melanchthon's theses, financed and attended by Frederick III, Elector of Saxony, and formally granted by deacon Justus Jonas. With the ceremony in Wittenberg's castle church (Schloßkirche), Aepinus, Bugenhagen and Cruciger became the first three Protestant doctors of theology.

While theological doctoral promotions had been suspended in Wittenberg for the preceding eight years, the promotion of Aepinus had become necessary as the Hamburg burghers demanded their new superintendent to bear the title of a doctor. (Note: In a letter to Bugenhagen, the Hamburg burghers demanded that their new superintendent Aepinus must "eyne Qualificerde parsonne nemptlick doctor theology syn" ("be a qualified person, that is a doctor of theology"). Selderhuis & Wriedt (2006), p. 58) Melanchthon had written the speech for Jonas which laid the foundation of a Protestant doctorate, and Frederick III "the Wise" sponsored a subsequent celebration to introduce the new Protestant doctorate to the theological world.

In September 1535, Bugenhagen was appointed Professor in the Theology faculty at Wittenberg.

=== Reformatory work ===
After he had outlined his reform ideas in a letter to the Hamburg community, Bugenhagen was the most important figure in the Protestant Reformation in Northern Germany and Scandinavia. He took an active lead in creating new church orders (Kirchenordnungen) for Hildesheim (1544), Hamburg (1528/29), Lübeck (1530–1532), the Duchy of Pomerania (1534/5), East Frisia (1534/5), Schleswig-Holstein (1542), Braunschweig (1528), Brunswick-Wolfenbüttel (1543), and Denmark-Norway (1537), where he also crowned Christian III.

This earned him later the epithet "Second Apostle of the North". Not only did he create the new rules, he also established them and persuaded people to follow them. Bugenhagen produced rules and regulations for religious service, for schooling, and for social issues of the church. In 1539, he became superintendent of the Lutheran Church in Saxony.

Also in 1539, Bugenhagen reformed the Pomeranian University of Greifswald, which he "re-founded" as a Protestant university, modelled after the university of Wittenberg.

Bugenhagen sought to inform the public that indulgences, not only done without God's word but against it.

=== Late life ===
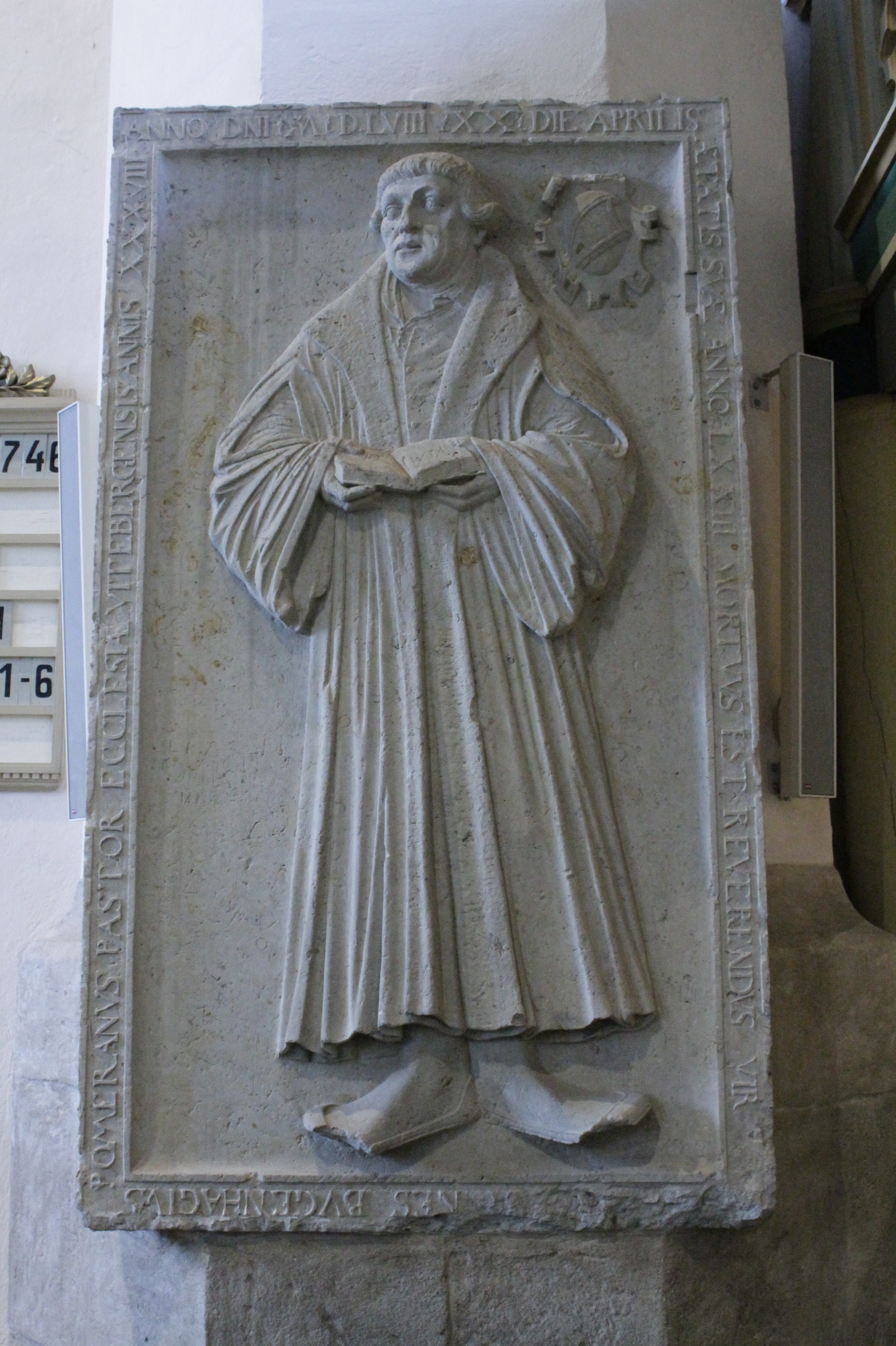
The grave of Johannes Bugenhagen in St. Mary's Church, Wittenberg

After the death of Luther in 1546, Bugenhagen took care of Luther's widow and children. Bugenhagen died in Wittenberg in 1558 and was buried at St. Mary's Church (Stadtkirche Wittenberg). The church also contains a memorial painting to Bugenhagen by Lucas Cranach the Younger depicting the baptism of Jesus Christ in the River Jordan by John the Baptist (with the whole Bugenhagen family watching).

Other than for his theological opinions, Bugenhagen was also well known because of his organising ability. Bugenhagen was also appreciated for his work in making a Middle Low German translation of Luther's Bible in 1534.

Johannes Bugenhagen was always a pastor at heart, and because of his love for music, his family coat of arms shows a harp.

== Family ==
His daughter Sara (died 1563) married Georg Cracow.

== See also ==
- Pomerania during the Early Modern Age
- Reformation in Denmark-Norway and Holstein
- Epistle to the English

== Sources ==
=== Bibliography ===
- Nieden, Marcel (2006). Die Erfindung des Theologen. Wittenberger Anweisungen zum Theologiestudium im Zeitalter von Reformation und Konfessionalisierung. Spätmittelalter und Reformation (in German). Vol. 28. Mohr Siebeck. ISBN 3-16-148878-4.
- Kaufmann, Thomas (1998). Reformatoren. Kleine Reihe Vandenhoeck und Ruprecht (in German). Vol. 4004. Vandenhoeck & Ruprecht. ISBN 3-525-34004-4.
- Kopitzsch, Franklin; Brietzke, Dirk (2001). Hamburgische Biografie. Personenlexikon (in German). Vol. II. Wallstein. ISBN 3-7672-1366-4.
- Hans-Günter Leder, Johannes Bugenhagen Pomeranus – vom Reformer zum Reformator. Studien zur Biographie (Frankfurt-am-Main: Peter Lang, 2002) (Greifswalder theologische Forschungen, 4).
- Hans-Günter Leder, Johannes Bugenhagen Pomeranus - Nachgelassene Studien zur Biographie mit einer Bibliographie zur Johannes Bugenhagen-Forschung, herausgegeben von Irmfried Garbe und Volker Gummelt (Frankfurt-am-Main, Peter Lang, 2008) (Greifswalder theologische Forschungen, 15).
- Lockhart, Paul Douglas (2007). Denmark, 1513–1660. The rise and decline of a Renaissance monarchy. Oxford University Press. ISBN 978-0-19-927121-4.
- Lorentzen, Tim (2008). Johannes Bugenhagen als Reformator der öffentlichen Fürsorge. Studies in the Late Middle Ages, Humanism and the Reformation (in German). Vol. 44. Mohr Siebeck. ISBN 978-3-16-149613-4.
- Hans-Otto Schneider, "Der späte Bugenhagen – Wittenberger Bürger, Kirchenpolitiker, Theologe und Stadtpfarrer", VIII. Frühjahrstagung zur Wittenberger Reformation veranstaltet vom Institut für Europäische Geschichte (IEG) Mainz und der Stiftung Luthergedenkstätten in Sachsen-Anhalt in Verbindung mit dem Institut für Kirchengeschichte der Universität Leipzig und der Evangelischen Stadtkirchengemeinde Wittenberg, Lutherstadt Wittenberg, Bugenhagenhaus, 19. bis 21. April 2008, in: AHF-Information (Arbeitsgemeinschaft historischer Forschungseinrichtungen in der Bundesrepublik Deutschland e.V.); Nr. 105 (6 June 2008)
- Selderhuis, Herman; Wriedt, Markus (2006). DBildung und Konfession. Theologenausbildung im Zeitalter der Konfessionalisierung. Spätmittelalter und Reformation. Vol. 27. Mohr Siebeck. ISBN 3-16-148878-4.
- Steinwachs, Albrecht; Pietsch, Jürgen (2000). Evangelische Stadt- und Pfarrkirche St. Marien Lutherstadt Wittenberg (in German). Edition Akanthus. ISBN 3-00-006918-6.
- Cf. Johann Heinrich Zietz, Johannes Bugenhagen – zweiter Apostel des Nordens, nach seinen Lebensschicksalen und seiner Wirksamkeit für die Gestaltung der evangelischen Kirche: Ein biographischer Versuch (^{1}1829), Leipzig: Sühring, ^{2}1834, passim
