= Hieronymus Baumgartner =

German politician (1498–1565)

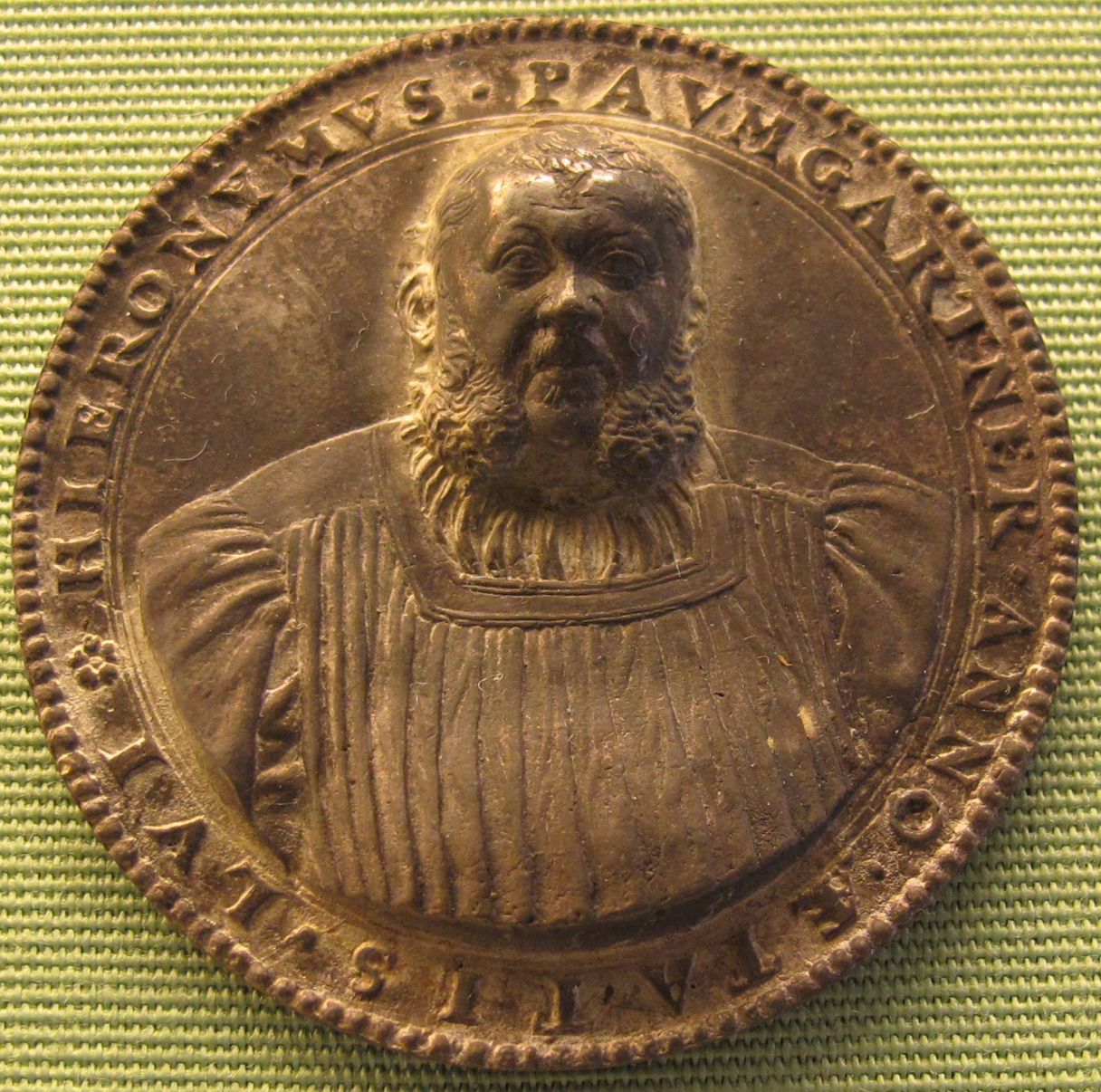
Hieronymus Baumgartner; medal by Joachim Deschler (1553)

Hieronymus Baumgartner, also von Paumgartner or Baumgärtner (9 March 1498, Nuremberg - 8 December 1565, Nuremberg) was a Bürgermeister, and a major contributor to the early Reformation.

== Biography ==
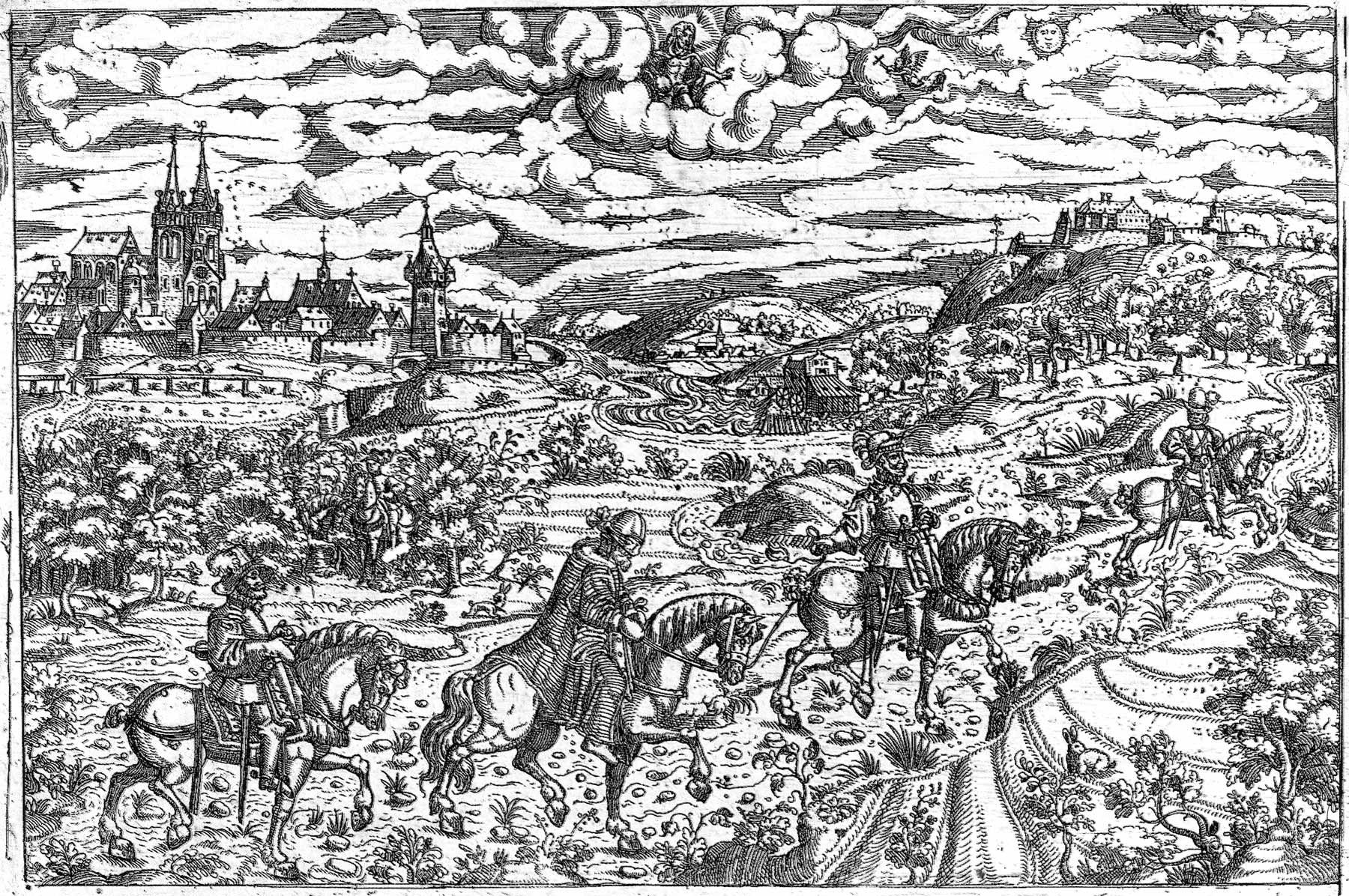
The Capture of Hieronymus Baumgartner, near Nuremberg; an etching by Hieronymus Hopfer

He was descended from the patrician family, "von Paumgartner auf Lonnerstadt", later known as "Paumgartner von Holnstein und Grünsberg". His father was a city council consultant, and he was tutored by Jakob Locher in Ingolstadt and Leipzig. In 1518, he became a student at the University of Wittenberg, where his fellow students included Georg Major, Joachim Camerarius and Philipp Melanchthon. He studied philosophy, mathematics, law and, under the influence of Martin Luther, Greek and Hebrew.

After graduating, he returned to Nuremberg as a follower of Luther and participated in local politics; rising rapidly. In 1525, he was elected to the city council; in 1533 he became the Bürgermeister (Mayor). He was also the city's first Kirchenpfleger (a type of financial manager for churches and schools). On a national scale, he became a "Triumvir" in 1558, which allowed him to take part in the Imperial Diet.

In 1525, he was a participant in the Nürnberger Religionsgespräch, a series of six discussions between old believers and Evangelicals, led by Christoph von Scheurl. The following year, together with Melanchthon and Lazarus Spengler, he helped establish Germany's first humanist school, the Melanchthon-Gymnasium Nürnberg. In 1536, he was involved with the Konvent in Schmalkalden, which produced the Schmalkald Articles, an ecumenical document signed by Luther in 1537. He also played a major role in introducing the Reformation to Heideck, Hilpoltstein and Allersberg. In 1548, he was opposed to the Augsburg Interim, an attempted compromise by Emperor Charles V, following the Schmalkaldic War.

In 1544, as he was returning from a meeting in Speyer, he was kidnapped by the Knight, Albrecht von Rosenberg, in the forest near Treschklingen, and was held for ransom. He was held captive for over fourteen months before the ransom was paid.

He was one of the many suitors of Katharina von Bora, who would eventually marry Martin Luther. However, in 1526, he married Sybilla Dichtlin (died 1567), the daughter of Bernhard Dichtel, a pfleger (castle manager) in Starnberg; originally from Tutzing.
