= Hans Bolsterer =

German sculptor, carver and medalist

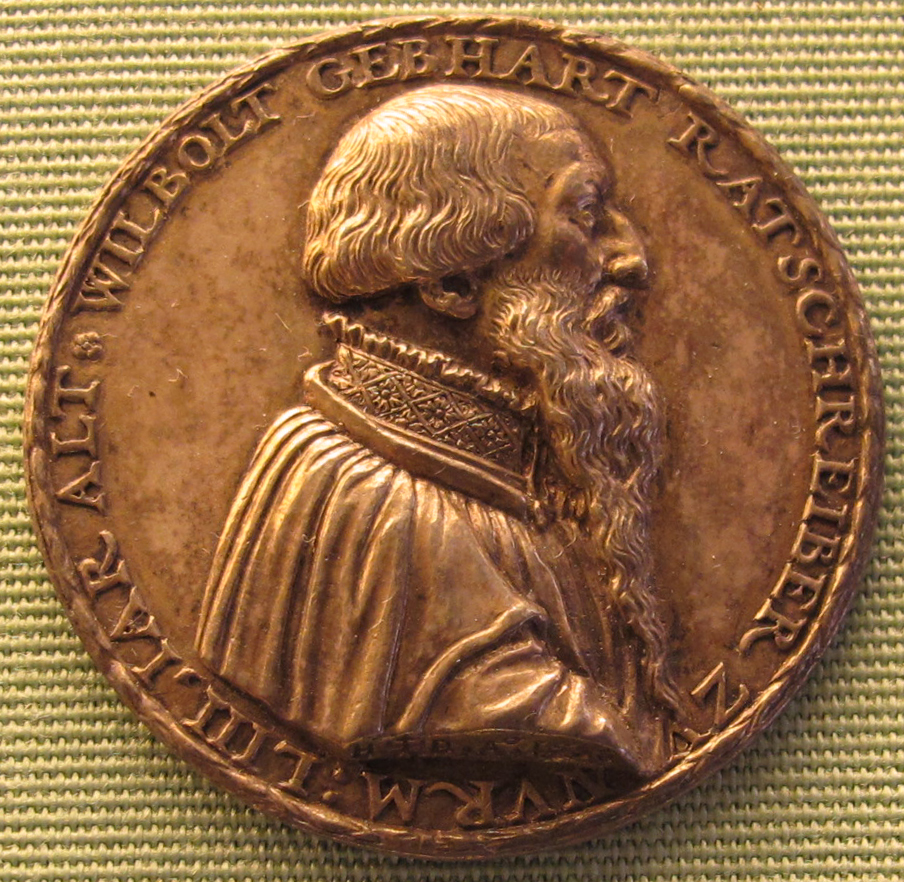
Wilbolt Gebhart, a Ratschreiber (law clerk), otherwise unknown; medal from 1555

Hans Bolsterer, also Hans Polster or Hans Polsterer (died 26 or 29 December 1573, Nuremberg) was a German sculptor, carver and medalist.

== Biography ==
His date and place of birth are unknown, as are the circumstances of his education. He is first reliably documented in 1540, when he was active in Nuremberg. In 1551, he was granted his Bürgerrechte (citizenship/civil rights) and was married. What appear to be temporary stays in Frankfurt am Main (1546) and Rödelheim (1548), are also documented.

His primary field of activity involved portrait medals, of which over thirty are known to have survived. In addition to members of the nobility, including Emperor Charles V, he portrayed a wide variety of ordinary citizens in Nuremberg and Frankfurt. He also created smaller ornaments, which may have served as models for goldsmiths, as well as several epitaphs for tombs.

His medals and ornaments are of a high artistic quality, but his larger works generally receive a lower rating. These include a tomb for Bishop Weigand of Redwitz, at Michaelsberg Abbey, Bamberg, and a "cartouche with female masks" (c.1550), which is now at the Germanisches Nationalmuseum. The museum also possesses a coat of arms for the Knight, Wolf Müntzer von Babenberg, which is attributed to Bolsterer on the basis of style.

He generally signed his works with the initials "HB", with a cross shaped "master's mark" in between.

== Sources ==
- Theodor Hampe: "Bolsterer (Bölsterer, Polsterer, Polster, Bolz?), Hans". In: Ulrich Thieme, Felix Becker (Eds.): Allgemeines Lexikon der Bildenden Künstler von der Antike bis zur Gegenwart, Vol. 4: Bida–Brevoort. Wilhelm Engelmann, Leipzig 1910, pg.254 (Online)
- Paul Grotemeyer (1955). "Bolsterer, Hans". Neue Deutsche Biographie (in German). Vol. 2. Berlin: Duncker & Humblot. p. 433. (full text online).
- (in German) Sven Hauschke: Bolsterer, Hans. In: Allgemeines Künstlerlexikon. Die Bildenden Künstler aller Zeiten und Völker (AKL). Band 12, Saur, München u. a. 1995, ISBN 3-598-22752-3, S. 413
