= Orlamünde =

- Town
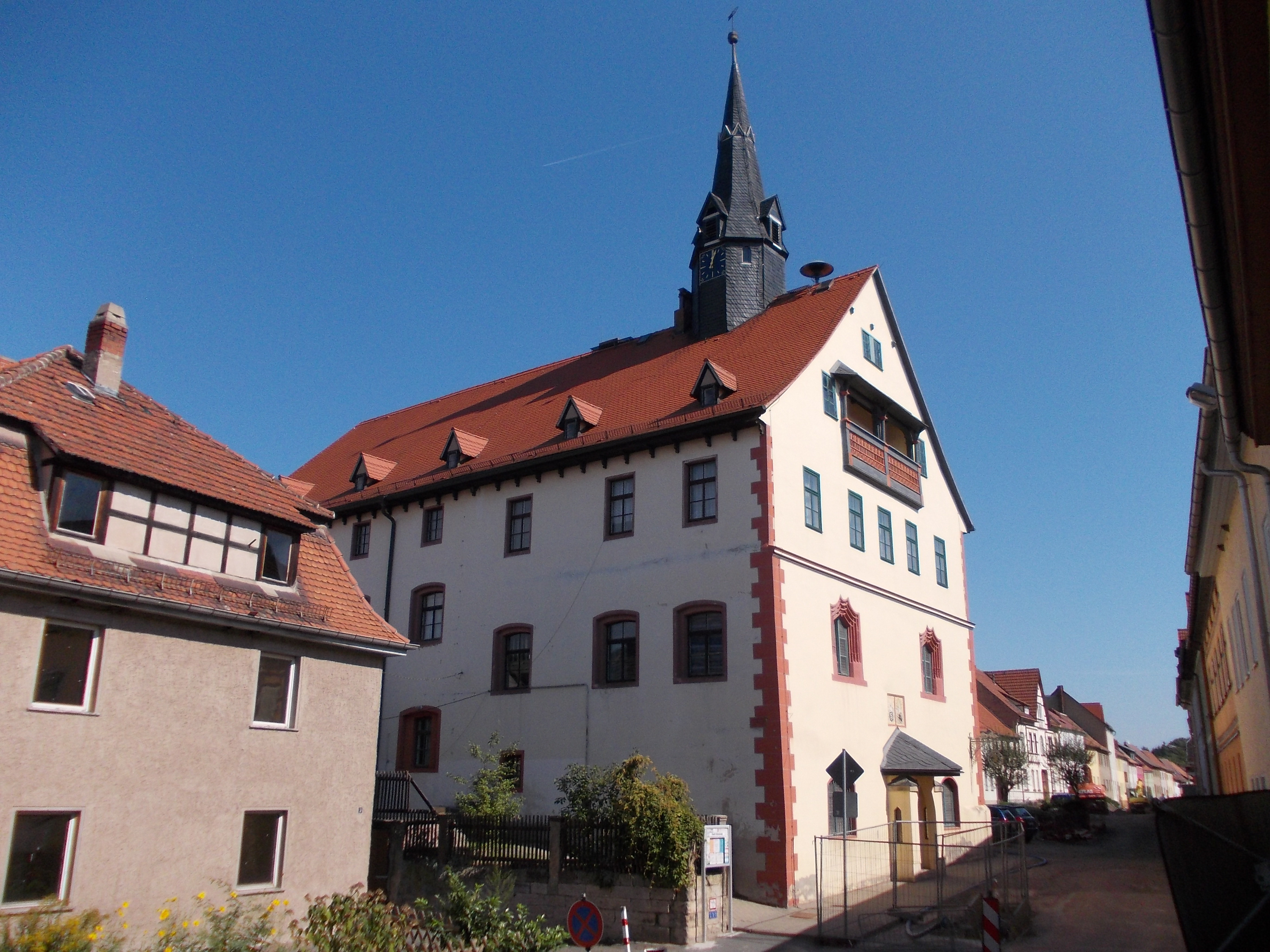
- Town hall

- Coat of arms

- Location of Orlamünde within Saale-Holzland-Kreis district
- Interactive map of Orlamünde
- Location within Germany Location within Thuringia
- Coordinates: 50°46′31″N 11°31′53″E
- Country: Germany
- State: Thuringia
- District: Saale-Holzland-Kreis
- Municipal assoc.: Südliches Saaletal

Government
  - Mayor (2022–28): Uwe Nitsche

Area
  - Total: 7.47 km^{2} (2.88 sq mi)
- Elevation: 207 m (679 ft)

Population (2025-12-31)
  - Total: 1,081
  - Density: 145/km^{2} (375/sq mi)
- Time zone: UTC+01:00 (CET)
  - Summer (DST): UTC+02:00 (CEST)
- Postal codes: 07768
- Dialling codes: 036423
- Vehicle registration: SHK, EIS, SRO
- Website: www.vg-suedliches-saaletal.de

Orlamünde (German pronunciation: [ɔʁlaˈmʏndə]) is a small town in the Saale-Holzland district, in Thuringia, Germany. It is part of the Verwaltungsgemeinschaft ("collective municipality") Südliches Saaletal.

== Geography ==
The town centre stretches along the steep banks of the Saale river at the confluence with the Orla, approximately 17 km (11 mi) south of Jena. With a population of about 1,100 it is one of the smallest towns in Thuringia.

Orlamünde station is a stop on the Saal Railway line from Großheringen to Saalfeld. Frome here the Orla Railway runs along the Orla river to Pößneck.

== History ==
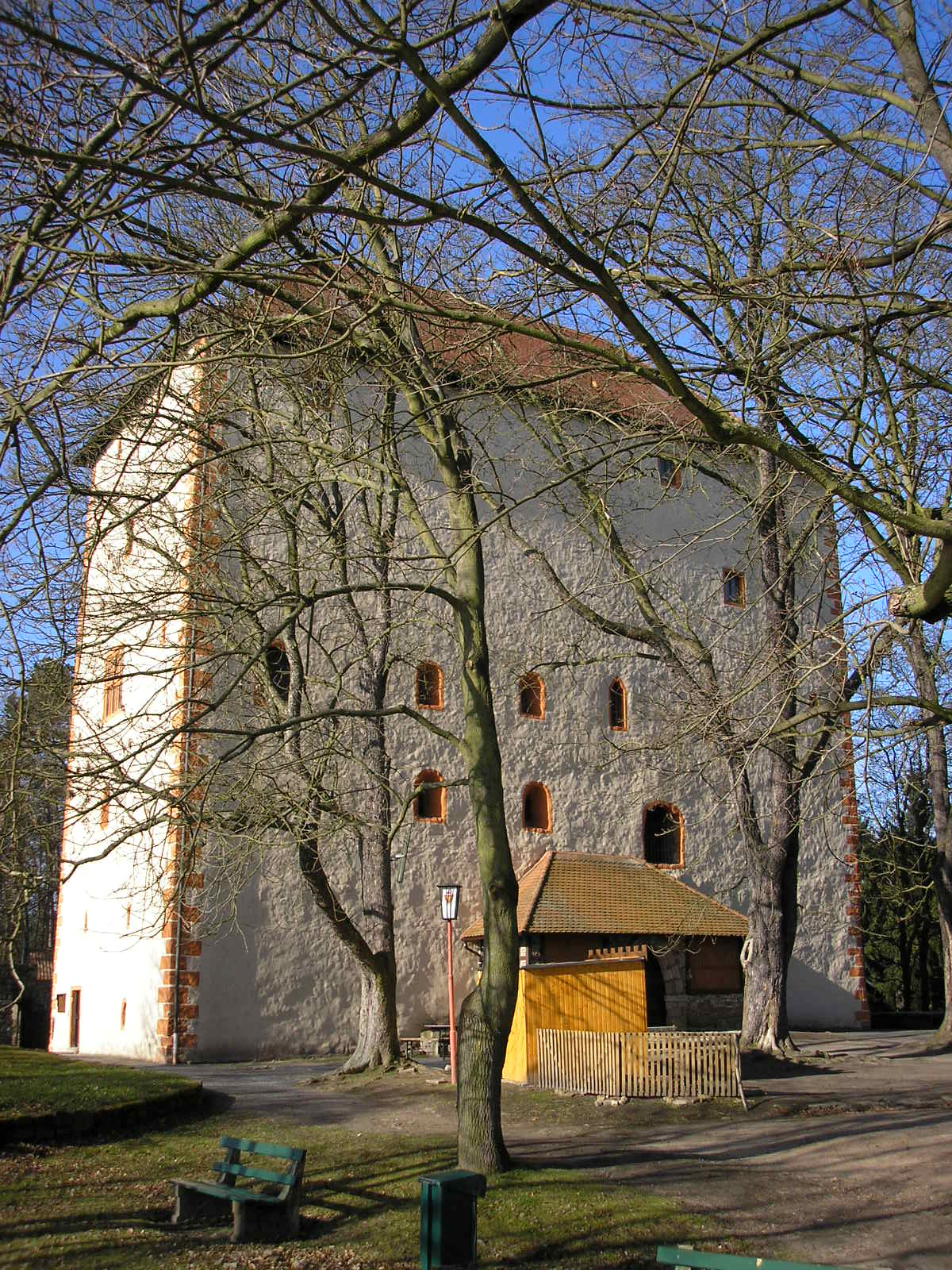
Orlamünde Castle

Located at the eastern rim of the early medieval Duchy of Thuringia, Orlamünde was the site of a fortress at the border with lands of the Polabian Slavs and the Sorbian March. The settlement itself was first mentioned in a 1039 deed. The estates were acquired by Count Otto of Weimar about 1062, who also ruled as Margrave of Meissen. He and his descendants went on to rule as Counts of Weimar-Orlamünde until the dynasty became extinct in 1112 and their possessions were inherited by the Saxon House of Ascania.

The St Mary's parish church was erected west of Orlamünde Castle in the 11th century. A Williamite monastery is documented from 1331. When the Ascanian counts of Weimar-Orlamünde became extinct in 1372, their estates fell to the House of Wettin.

== Notable people ==
- Andreas Karlstadt (1486–1541), reformer, priest in Orlamünde in 1523/24
- Kaspar Glatz (d. 1551), Lutheran reformer, priest in Orlamünde from 1524
