= Kaspar Glatz =

Kaspar Glatz (died 1551) was a minor figure in reformation-era Lutheranism. Trained in the early days of the reformation by Martin Luther at Wittenberg, he served as a pastor in the new movement for more than 20 years. The most comprehensive biographical sketch is contained in the late nineteenth-century Allgemeine Deutsche Biographie.

== Early life ==
Glatz came from Rieden in the Augsburg diocese, but it is unclear precisely which place this indicates. He arrived in Wittenberg in 1523, at which point it is said that he was “not a young man.” (As he lived another 28 years, as he was a potential suitor of the mid-twenties Katharina von Bora, and as he is known to have later married and fathered children, he must not have been extremely old.) That same year he received his doctorate and became a lecturer.

== Appointment to Pastorate ==
In 1524 he went to Orlamünde, which was under the archdeaconate of Wittenberg, to become its pastor. Complicating matters was the presence of a current pastor, Andreas Karlstadt. In the face of Martin Luther’s opposition to his more radical tendencies, Karlstadt retreated from Wittenberg to Orlamünde in 1523 and there continued his particular version of reform. In September 1524, Luther succeeded in getting Karlstadt removed from the church in Orlamünde and exiled from the region. At this point, after a letter from Luther, Glatz was made the pastor.

Around the same time, Luther, as part of his continuing work to assist former nuns to find husbands, encouraged Katharina von Bora to marry Glatz. It is unclear as to whether Glatz himself actively courted Katharina. She refused and in June 1525 married Luther instead.

While at Orlamünde, Glatz was a source of information to Luther on Karlstadt's activities. One letter from Glatz survives, dated January 18, 1525, to which Luther refers in his letter to Spalatin.

== Removal from Pastorate ==
In 1536, Glatz was removed as pastor of Orlamünde. According to historians, he was removed either because he had alienated the congregation and town officials or over tribute payments to the Wittenberg Archdiaconate. His replacement was Liborius Magdeburg, who had come into Luther’s good graces during his time in Wittenberg. Glatz complained that Magdeburg had undermined him and caused his removal.

Magdeburg was appointed pastor of Orlamünde in late 1537 and did not actually arrive until February 13, 1538. There was some trouble between Glatz and Magdeburg. One historian claims that Glatz verbally attacked Magdeburg and demanded payments from the pastoral endowment. Luther had received a letter from Magdeburg, complaining that Glatz was causing him trouble. Luther forwarded the letter with a note asking Francis Burchart to have the elector attend to it.

== Restoration to Pastorate ==
In early April 1539, Magdeburg died and Glatz was restored to the pastorate. That same month, Glatz wrote a letter to Stephan Roth (with whom matriculated at Wittenberg in 1523). Roth was the Zwickau city clerk and school inspector, though his influence extended far beyond his titles. Magdeburg had married Roth’s sister Magdalene in 1532, so Roth had an interest in the well-being of the late pastor’s widow. Glatz assured Roth that he had been ministering to her over the loss of her husband and the illness of their child.

The following month Glatz again wrote to Roth, informing him that he had forgiven the widow a debt that her late husband owed him over the purchase of a horse. Further he allowed her to keep some linens that had been property of the church for her use. He reminded Roth that he was under no obligation to help her, as Magdeburg had caused Glatz and his family a great deal of harm. We learn from this letter that Glatz did marry and produced children.

== Response to the Augsburg Interim ==
Nothing more is known of Glatz until 1548. In 1547, the Roman Catholic Charles V scored a great military victory over the Schmalkaldic League of Evangelical princes. The Protestant Elector John Frederick I of Saxony was taken prisoner. His cousin Moritz, who fought on Charles’ side, was made elector of Saxony, and John Frederick was left as prince over a much smaller territory. His sons ruled in his stead while he was imprisoned.

Charles then directed the drawing up of what was called the Augsburg Interim. This document established a compromise religious position in the Protestant lands, but in reality re-established Roman Catholicism with a few concessions to the Protestants.

The Interim was sent to local officials throughout Protestant territories, including the Saxony princes. Upon receipt, they brought together at Weimar theologians, pastors, and town officials from the territory they still controlled. This company included Glatz. The assembled group condemned the Interim as having as much to do with the Augsburg Confession “as Christ with Belial.” Their document was titled Der Prediger der Jungen Herrn/Johans Friderichen Hertzogen zu Sachssen etc. Sönen/Christlich Bedencken auss das Interim which reads in English From the Preachers of the Sons of the Young Ruler John Frederick Elector of Saxony, etc.: Christian Objections to the Interim. Glatz was the third signer of sixteen. He signed as “D. & Ecclesiae Orlamundensis Parochus” (doctor and pastor of the church in Orlamünde).

This was not the most significant response to the Interim; many regions also responded. Though the statement of the preachers at Weimar was only one of many, it was still a courageous stand taken by Glatz and the others, as Saxony was fresh off military defeat at the hands of the emperor.

== Evaluation ==
Glatz has been treated harshly by some historians. For example: "Caspar Glatz, matriculated at Wittenberg, became rector of the university 1524; pastor at Orlamünde, a suitor of Catharine von Bora, who rejected him. He turned out rather badly." Or this: "He [Luther] had even thought, shortly before, of arranging a marriage between her and a minister named Glatz, who later on, however, proved himself unworthy of this office." His career was rather unremarkable, but besides the short time that he was removed from office, his life seems to have turned out satisfactorily.

Though he was rejected by Katharina (she had her eye on Luther early), he did find a wife and raised a family. Though he was removed from office for reasons that are a bit uncertain to us, he was considered worthy enough to be quickly restored to that office when his successor died. Though Magdeburg complained of the way Glatz treated him (there is no confirmation of this), Glatz treated his widow kindly. In his only known action while pastor, he took a brave stand at Weimar. He died in 1551.
