= Glatzer =

Glatzer is a surname. Notable people with the surname include:

- Ben Glatzer (born 1959), Australian sound engineer, producer
- Jack Glatzer (born 1939), American violinist
- Jonathan Glatzer (born 1969), American writer, director, and producer
- Nahum Norbert Glatzer (1903–1990), American literary scholar, theologian, and editor

== See also ==
- Glatzer Neisse, a river in southwestern Poland
