= Good Fences Make Good Neighbors =

Ai Weiwei 2017–18 New York City public art exhibition

Good Fences Make Good Neighbors was Ai Weiwei's 2017–18 citywide public art exhibition in New York City.

== History ==
The exhibit was sponsored by the Public Art Fund and included more than 300 artworks spread across the five boroughs of New York City. It was open to the public from October 12, 2017, to February 11, 2018.

== See also ==
- List of works by Ai Weiwei
