= Map of China =

2008 sculpture by Ai Weiwei

Map of China is a 2008 sculpture by Chinese artist Ai Weiwei. The sculpture has been reported as resembling a park bench or tree trunk, but its cross-section is a map of China. It is four metres long and weighs 635 kilograms. It is made from wood salvaged from Qing Dynasty temples.

== See also ==
- List of works by Ai Weiwei
