= WeiweiCam =

Artistic project by Chinese artist Ai Weiwei

WeiweiCam is a self-surveillance project by artist Ai Weiwei, in China, that went live on April 3, 2012, exactly one year after the artist's detention by Chinese officials at Beijing Airport. At least fifteen surveillance cameras monitor his house in Beijing which, according to Ai, makes it the most-watched spot of the city.

== Description ==
He described his decision to put himself under further surveillance as a symbolic way to increase transparency in the Chinese government. WeiweiCam consisted of four webcams that sent a live 24-hour feed publicly viewable from the website weiweicam.com. 46 hours after the site went live Ai Weiwei was instructed to shut down WeiweiCam by Chinese authorities.

== Reception and legacy ==
During the time weiweicam.com was live it received 5.2 million views.

WeiweiCam was included in "What We Watch", an exhibition on net art and surveillance, at COFAspace Gallery, UNSW College of Fine Arts.

Until June 30, 2013, WeiweiCam was seen at the Kunstpalais Erlangen, Germany. In the context of the exhibition "Freedom!" the visitors can contact the artist directly via Twitter.

== See also ==
- Caochangdi
- List of works by Ai Weiwei
