= Pathogenesis: A History of the World in Eight Plagues =

Non fiction book

Pathogenesis: A history of the world in eight plagues is a 2023 non-fiction book written by Jonathan Kennedy and published by Penguin Random House. In the UK, the book's subtitle is How germs made history.

== Synopsis ==
It explores the impact of infectious diseases on human history. Drawing on evidence from a wide range of academic disciplines, Kennedy argues that pandemics have played a crucial but overlooked role in many of the great social, political and economic transformations of the past, including the extinction of Neanderthals, the emergence of Christianity and Islam as world religions, the transition from feudalism to capitalism, the European colonization of the Americas, and the emergence of the transatlantic slave trade.

== Reception ==
Pathogenesis featured in The Sunday Times' Best science and environment books of 2023, Amazon's Best science books of 2023. The book was also nominated in the Goodreads Choice Awards 2023 under the History and Biography category.

Pathogenesis was a national bestseller in the US and a Boston Globe bestseller.

The book was serialised on BBC Radio 4's Book of the Week.
