= Book of the Week =

- Genre: Literary reading
- Running time: 15 mins
- Country of origin: United Kingdom
- Language: English
- Home station: BBC Radio 4
- Created by: Di Speirs
- Narrated by: Various readers
- Original release: 1998 – present
- Opening theme: Various selected music
- Website: BBC website page

Book of the Week is a long-running BBC Radio 4 series, first broadcast in 1998. It features daily readings from an abridged version of a selected book read over five or occasionally ten weekday episodes. Each episode is approximately 15 minutes long and is broadcast in the morning at 9:45 am, with a repeat airing early next morning at 00:30 am.

== History ==
Book of the Week was launched in 1998 under the editorship of Di Speirs, who has had a significant role in producing Radio 4's literary output. In 2009, Radio 4 controller Mark Damazer described the series as "a vital part of Radio 4".

In 2010, the programme temporarily made way for the 100-episode series A History of the World in 100 Objects, a collaboration between the BBC and the British Museum.

== Format and content ==
An abridged version of a selected new book is read by a professional actor or the author. The selections often include memoirs, biographies, historical accounts, and cultural analyses. For each book, there are usually five daily weekday episodes over one week, but occasionally extend to 10 episodes over two weeks.

The academic Macdonald Daly analysed ten weeks of selections in 2014 and found that they were all non-fiction and he assessed them as being middlebrow and mostly backward-looking. They had all been recently published and he criticised this as being too promotional. He estimated the number of pages which would be read in a week of five episodes as 46.5 and considered this too few for longer works.

Literary critics have noted the convenience of listening to the 15-minute episodes rather than the longer radio shows. In a review for The Observer, Miranda Sawyer wrote that each short episode presented something worth knowing, and listeners can easily keep up with the daily readings by listening regularly in short bursts. With the audience of white-collar workers in mind, writing in The Independent, the critic Nicholas Lezard wrote that the morning edition would not coincide with the morning drive to work and the late edition should be convenient too.

== Audience and reception ==
According to the BBC's audience statistics for 2016 to 2017, Book of the Week reaches over three million listeners per week. The BBC's statistics show that it attracts a predominantly female (60%) and older (50% are 65+) audience with 72% of the listeners being white-collar workers.

Critics have praised the actors' narrations and the additional impact provided by authors reading their own books. Notable authors who have read their own books include Michelle Obama, who read a version of her book The Light We Carry in 2023, and Clive James, who read a version of his book The Blaze of Obscurity in October 2009.

In November 2021, the actor Benedict Wong read Ai Weiwei's book 1000 Years of Joys and Sorrows. Writing in The Guardian, Miranda Sawyer reviewed the national audio and selected Wong's reading as one of her three highlights of the week. In similar reviews, Sawyer highlighted Greta Thunberg's Book of the Week reading of her own book The Climate Book in October 2022, and Rachel Cooke praised Hugh Bonneville's reading of Philip Larkin's letters to his girlfriend, Monica Jones, in November 2010.

== See also ==
- Book at Bedtime – a similar show which has been broadcast by the BBC since 1949.
