= Sunflower Seeds =

Sunflower seeds are the seeds of the sunflower (Helianthus).

Sunflower Seeds may also refer to:

- Sunflower Seeds (artwork), a 2010-2011 art installation created by contemporary artist and political activist Ai Weiwei
- "Sunflower Seeds" (song) by Bryce Vine
