= Lu Qing =

Chinese modern artist

Lu Qing (Chinese: 路青) is a Chinese modern and contemporary artist.

== Early life ==
Qing was born in 1964, in Shenyang, the Capital of Liaoning province in the Northeast. She moved in Beijing when she was 16 to enroll in art school. Both of her parents had background in the arts, she was warned not to follow in their footsteps for fear of any recurrence of the persecution and imprisonment of the artist that occurred during the cultural revolution. She is quoted saying, "institutional education system that standardized art into 'right or wrong', I was very rebellious throughout my eight years against this old system". "I became an artist to focus on my own interests".

Qing graduated from the Central Academy of Fine Arts in 1989.

== Career ==
Despite the rising Beijing East Village artists, who created performance art that often tested the limits of the human body, in the 1980s Lu was uninfluenced and instead worked on her own interests. At the beginning of the 21st century, she began yearly projects. At the beginning of the year, she buys 82 feet of fine silk and over the length of the year she paints, using acrylic, tightly fitted patterns. How filled the length of silk varies year to year, dependent on whether she feels like painting; one year she left the silk completely blank. Lu's art is a quiet, meditative affair, done in the comfort of her own home; though she herself doesn't see what she is doing as art at all. The way she paints on the silk is reminiscent of traditional Chinese scroll painting, historically, a male dominated medium.

She currently works and lives in Beijing, China. Now this contemporary artist is known for her style of being a Sculpture Artist. The majority of her artwork consist of prints, exhibition posters, monographs, books, collectibles. Not much is known about Lu Qing as she avoids appearing in public settings.

== Personal life ==
She is married to the artist architect Ai Weiwei, though they are estranged as a result of his arrest by Chinese authorities.
