= 1000 Years of Joys and Sorrows =

2021 memoir by Ai Weiwei

1000 Years of Joys and Sorrows: A Memoir is a 2021 memoir by Ai Weiwei. Allan H. Barr is the translator of the English version. Crown published the book in the United States, and Bodley Head published the book in the United Kingdom.

The title refers to poetry done by Ai's father, Ai Qing. The book also chronicles similarities between the lives of Ai Qing and Ai Weiwei.

== Background ==
While he had been incarcerated, Ai decided to chronicle his own biography because he wanted to leave a record of his life for his child, especially as Ai Weiwei feared the Chinese government could try to remove other records related to his own life.

Ai Weiwei also wrote the book as a way of resolving how he felt he had, in the words of Jiayang Fan of The New York Times, an "unbridgeable gap" with Ai Qing.

== Contents ==
The memoir chronicles periods when Ai came into disputes with the Government of the People's Republic of China.

== Release ==
The BBC hosted an audio reading done by Benedict Wong.

== Reception ==
Joan Gaylord of the Christian Science Monitor described the book as "A fascinating biography" and "a testament to that creative spirit."

Sean O'Hagan of The Guardian wrote that the book "is above all a story of inherited resilience, strength of character and self-determination."

Publishers Weekly gave a starred review, and argued that the book "easily sits in the top tier of dissident writing." Kirkus Reviews described it as "beautiful and poignant".

Kate Taylor of The Globe and Mail described the portions about Ai Qing as being "Perhaps the most gripping".

== See also ==
- List of works by Ai Weiwei
