= Sunflower Seeds (artwork) =

Art installation by Ai Weiwei

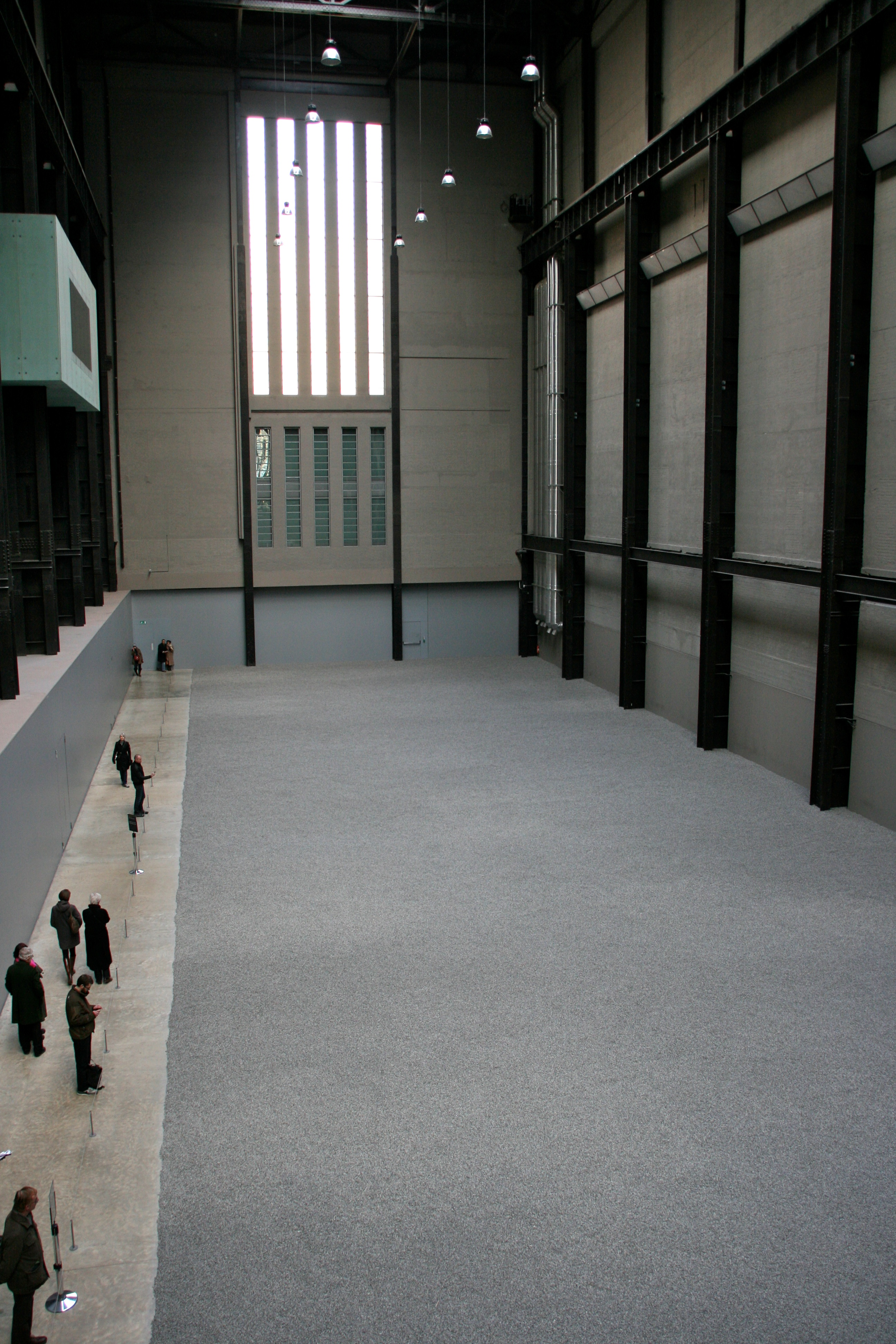
- Ai Weiwei's Sunflower Seeds in the Tate Modern
- Artist: Ai Weiwei
- Year: 2008
- Medium: Porcelain
- Location: Tate Modern, London
- Website: web.archive.org/web/20160913115227/http://www.aiweiweiseeds.com/

Kui Hua Zi (Sunflower Seeds) is an art installation created by contemporary artist and political activist Ai Weiwei. It was first exhibited at the Tate Modern art gallery in London from 12 October 2010 to 2 May 2011. The work consisted of one hundred million individually hand-crafted porcelain sunflower seeds which filled the gallery's 1,000 square metre Turbine Hall to depth of ten centimetres.

Viewers were originally able to interact and walk across the sunflower seeds, but after the Tate Modern Museum feared that the dust emitted from the installation could be harmful, they fenced it off. Smaller collections of the seeds have been exhibited in twelve museums and galleries across the world from 2009 to 2013.

== Background ==
Ai Weiwei is a conceptual artist from China. Towards the later 20th century, he led societal movements challenging the Chinese Communist Party. Ai has felt the presence and pressures of the society that the Chinese government has imposed on the peoples, and that is generated into his artwork. "From a very young age I started to sense that an individual has to set an example in society", he has said. "Your own acts and behaviour tell the world who you are and at the same time what kind of society you think it should be."

== Process ==
This massive art installation includes over 100 million porcelain sunflower seeds that cover a 1,000 m² floor with a depth of 10 cm in the Tate Modern's Turbine Hall. The entire artwork weighs around 150 tons. Each seed went through a 30 step procedure, hand painted and fired at 1,300°C. This process required more than 1,600 workers over a span of two and a half years in Jingdezhen, a town known as the "Porcelain Capital", that has produced the imperial porcelain for over a thousand years. Ai began the process two-and-a-half years before its exhibition at the Tate Modern.

== Influence and context ==
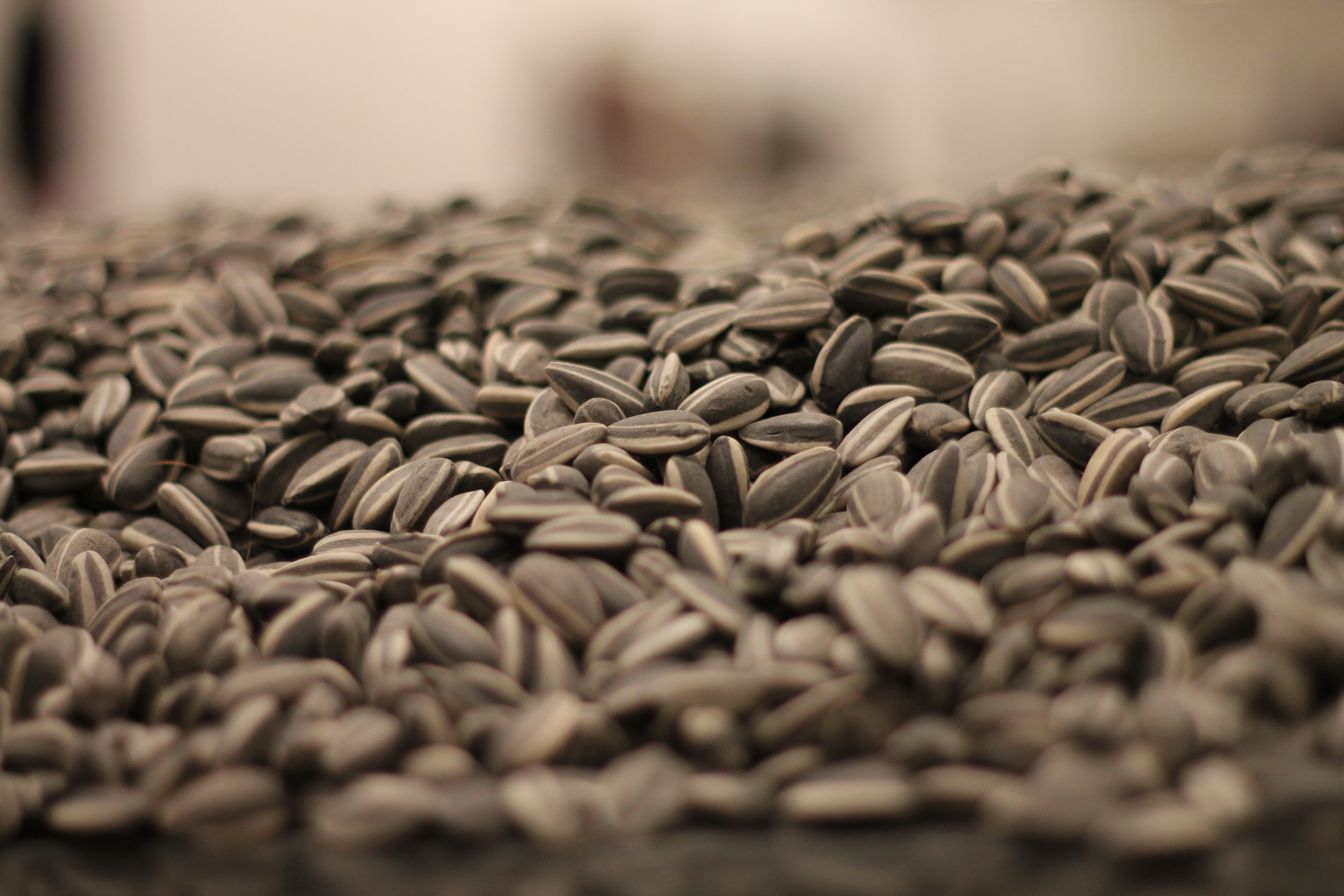
Close up of Ai Weiwei's Sunflower Seeds

Sunflower seeds were a common theme in the Chinese Communist Party's political propaganda during Ai's childhood. Leader Mao Zedong would often represent himself as the sun, and the people of China as seeds on sunflowers. Ai also explains that when he was growing up, even the poorest families in China could share the seeds as a treat. The seeds represent optimism during difficult times.

== Interpretation ==
When looking at the seeds up close in Tate Modern's Turbine Hall, picking out each unique seed proves to be an easy task. However, when standing farther back once each of the 100 million seeds is deposited in a neat and orderly fashion, altogether a sense of expanse and immenseness is felt by the viewers. The millions of individually created seeds spread across such a wide space are meant to symbolize the vastness of China, and its uniform and precise order. An individual seed is instantly lost among the millions, symbolizing the conformity and censorship of the Chinese Communist Party. The combination of all the seeds represent that together, the people of China can stand up and overthrow the Chinese Communist Party.

Most of Ai's artworks and projects carry this theme of making the Chinese Government's faults transparent to the rest of the world, as well as encouraging freedom of expression and strength to act. Along with this, the seeds represent China's growing mass production stemming from the consumerist culture, particularly that in the Western world, upon which Chinese exporters rely. The sculpture directly challenges the "Made in China" mantra that China is known for, considering the labor-intensive and traditional method used to create the work. The work triggered inquiries from the viewers of the piece about their society and the effects of consumerism.

== Exhibition ==
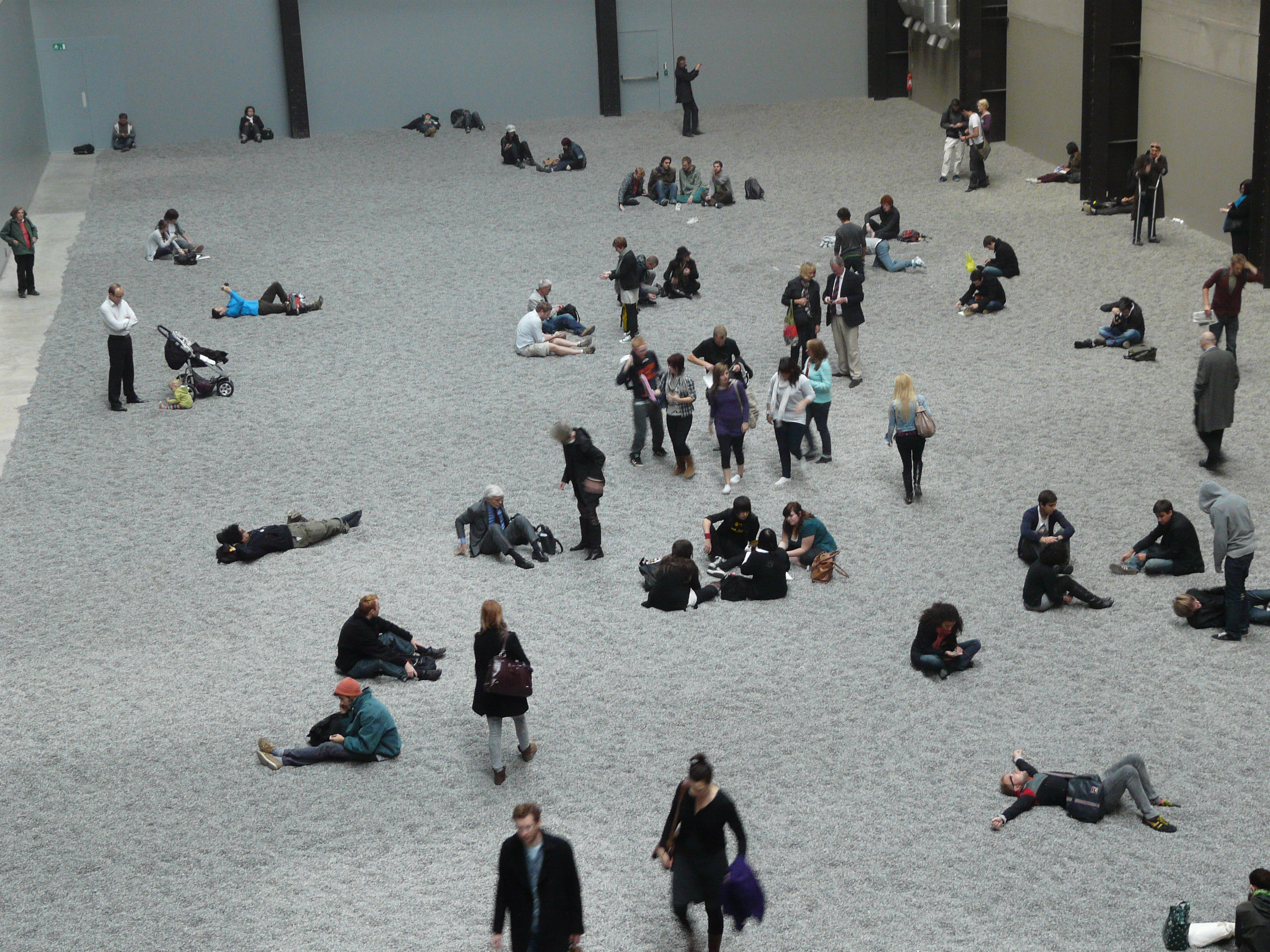
Visitors at the Tate Modern interacting with the piece, 2010

Visitors to the Turbine Hall were initially allowed to walk over the work and encouraged to interact with the piece, but fears over the quantities of ceramic dust raised from the seeds soon caused the work to be roped off. Will Gompertz lamented the decision and stated: "Standing or kneeling at the rim will be a bit like looking at an empty picture frame instead of one that actually has a picture in it."

Another interactive element of the piece was the installation of booths with video cameras around the work which enabled visitors to ask questions to Ai, and he replied online.

== Reception ==
Andrew Graham-Dixon noted that in Communist propaganda sunflowers turned towards the face of Mao, but "Ai Weiwei's multitude of seeds face and follow no one. They form a fragmented world, something atomised, smashed to rubble. And maybe that's what they're truly meant to portend: the fall of China's old guard, the dismantling of the totalitarian system, which will take place as surely as every tide will always turn." He considered the work to be "a melancholy piece".

Richard Dorment called it a masterpiece, and Adrian Searle was also positive, saying it was "audacious, subtle, unexpected but inevitable," and transcended similar minimal works like Wolfgang Laib's pollen fields, Richard Long's stones or Antony Gormley's fields of human figures. He praised Ai as the "best artist to have appeared since the Cultural Revolution in China." Art Asia Pacific said the work was "meticulous, beautiful, sparse, suggestive, even emotional, but it was not prescriptive".

== Auctions and further exhibitions ==
An initial auction in early 2011 at Sotheby's in London for 100 kg of the seeds fetched US$559,394, a further sale at Sotheby's New York in 2012 reached US$782,000. In 2012 The Tate acquired approximately 8 million seeds weighing 10 tonnes which had been displayed by the gallery as a cone five metres in diameter and one and a half metres tall.

== See also ==
- List of works by Ai Weiwei
