= List of works by Ai Weiwei =

The following is a partial list of works by Chinese contemporary artist and activist Ai Weiwei.

== Documentaries ==
Beijing video works

From 2003 to 2005, Ai Weiwei recorded the results of Beijing's developing urban infrastructure and its social conditions.

=== Beijing 2003 ===
2003, Video, 150 hours

Beginning under the Dabeiyao highway interchange, the vehicle from which Beijing 2003 was shot traveled every road within the Fourth Ring Road of Beijing and documented the road conditions. Approximately 2400 kilometers and 150 hours of footage later, it ended where it began under the Dabeiyao highway interchange. The documentation of these winding alleyways of the city center – now largely torn down for redevelopment – preserved a visual record of the city that is free of aesthetic judgment.

=== Chang'an Boulevard ===
2004, Video, 10h 13m

Moving from east to west, Chang'an Boulevard traverses Beijing's most iconic avenue. Along the boulevard's 45-kilometer length, it recorded the changing densities of its far-flung suburbs, central business districts, and political core. At each 50-meter increment, the artist records a single frame for one minute. The work reveals the rhythm of Beijing as a capital city, its social structure, cityscape, socialist-planned economy, capitalist market, political power center, commercial buildings, and industrial units as pieces of a multi-layered urban collage.

=== Beijing: The Second Ring ===
2005, Video, 1h 6m

=== Beijing: The Third Ring ===
2005 Video, 1h 50m

Beijing: The Second Ring and Beijing: The Third Ring capture two opposite views of traffic flow on every bridge of each Ring Road, the innermost arterial highways of Beijing. The artist records a single frame for one minute for each view on the bridge. Beijing: The Second Ring was entirely shot on cloudy days, while the segments for Beijing: The Third Ring were entirely shot on sunny days. The films document the historic aspects and modern development of a city with a population of nearly 11 million people.

=== Fairytale ===
2007, video, 2h 32m

Fairytale covers Ai Weiwei's project Fairytale, part of Europe's most innovative five-year art event Documenta 12 in Kassel, Germany in 2007. Ai invited 1001 Chinese citizens of different ages and from various backgrounds to travel to Kassel, Germany to experience a fairytale of their own. The 152-minute long film documents the ideation and process of staging Fairytale and covering project preparations, participants' challenges, and travel to Germany.

Along with this documentary, Fairytale was documented through written materials and photographs of participants and artifacts from the event.

Fairytale was an act of social subversion, improving relationships between China and the West through interactions among participants and the citizens of Kassel. Ai Weiwei felt that he was able to make a positive influence on both participants of Fairytale and Kassel citizens.

=== Little Girl's Cheeks ===
2008, video, 1h 18m

On 15 December 2008, a citizens' investigation began with the goal of seeking an explanation for the casualties of the Sichuan earthquake that happened on 12 May 2008. The investigation covered 14 counties and 74 townships within the disaster zone, and studied the conditions of 153 schools that were affected by the earthquake. By gathering and confirming comprehensive details about the students, such as their age, region, school, and grade, the group managed to affirm that there were 5,192 students who perished in the disaster. Among a hundred volunteers, 38 of them participated in fieldwork, with 25 of them being controlled by the Sichuan police for a total of 45 times. This documentary is a structural element of the citizens' investigation.

=== 4851 ===
2009, looped video, 1h 27m

At 14:28 on 12 May 2008, an 8.0-magnitude earthquake happened in Sichuan, China. Over 5,000 students in primary and secondary schools perished in the earthquake, yet their names went unannounced. In reaction to the government's lack of transparency, a citizen's investigation was initiated to find out their names and details about their schools and families. As of 2 September 2009, there were 4,851 confirmed. This video is a tribute to these perished students and a memorial for innocent lives lost.

=== A Beautiful Life ===
2009, video, 48m

This video documents the story of Chinese citizen Feng Zhenghu and his struggles to return home. The Shanghai authorities rejected Feng Zhenghu, originated from Wenzhou, Zhejiang, China, from returning to the country for a total of eight times in 2009. On 4 November 2009, Feng Zhenghu attempted to return home for the ninth time but the police from Shanghai used violence and kidnapped him to board a flight to Japan. Feng refused to enter Japan and decided to live in the Immigration Hall at Terminal 1 of the Narita Airport in Tokyo, as an act of protest. He relied on food gifts from tourists for sustenance and lived at a passageway in the Narita Airport for 92 days. He posted updates over Twitter, they attracted much concern and led to wide media coverage from Chinese netizens and international communities. On 31 January, Feng announced an end to his protest at the Narita Airport. On 12 February, Feng was allowed entry to China, where he reunited with his family at home in Shanghai. Ai Weiwei and his assistant Gao Yuan, went from Beijing to interview Feng Zhenghu three times at the Narita Airport of Japan on 16 November 20 November 2009 and 31 January 2010, and documented his life at the airport passageway and the entire process of his return to China.

=== Disturbing the Peace (Laoma Tihua) ===
2009, video, 1h 19m

Ai Weiwei studio production Laoma Tihua is a documentary of an incident during Tan Zuoren's trial on 12 August 2009. Tan Zuoren was charged with "inciting subversion of state power". Chengdu police detained witnessed during the trial of the civil rights advocate, which is an obstruction of justice and violence. Tan Zuoren was charged as a result of his research and questioning regarding the 5.12 Wenchuan students' casualties and the corruption resulting poor building construction. Tan Zuoren was sentenced to five years of prison.

=== One Recluse ===
2010, video, 3h

In June 2008, Yang Jia carried a knife, a hammer, a gas mask, pepper spray, gloves and Molotov cocktails to the Zhabei Public Security Branch Bureau and killed six police officers, injuring another police officer and a guard. He was arrested on the scene, and was subsequently charged with intentional homicide. In the following six months, while Yang Jia was detained and trials were held, his mother has mysteriously disappeared. This video is a documentary that traces the reasons and motivations behind the tragedy and investigates into a trial process filled with shady cover-ups and questionable decisions. The film provides a glimpse into the realities of a government-controlled judicial system and its impact on the citizens' lives.

=== Hua Hao Yue Yuan ===
2014, video, 2h 6m

“The future dictionary definition of 'crackdown' will be: First cover one’s head up firmly, and then beat him or her up violently.” – @aiww In the summer of 2010. On separate, locations. The incidents attracted much concern over the Internet, as well as wide speculation and theories about what exactly happened. This documentary presents interviews of the two victims, witnesses and concerned netizens. In which it gathers various perspectives about the two beatings, and brings us closer to the brutal reality of China's “crackdown on crime”.

=== Remembrance ===
2010, voice recording, 3h 41m

On 24 April 2010 at 00:51, Ai Weiwei (@aiww) started a Twitter campaign to commemorate students who perished in the earthquake in Sichuan on 12 May 2008. 3,444 friends from the Internet delivered voice recordings, the names of 5,205 perished were recited 12,140 times. Remembrance is an audio work dedicated to the young people who lost their lives in the Sichuan earthquake. It expresses thoughts for the passing of innocent lives and indignation for the cover-ups on truths about sub-standard architecture, which led to the large number of schools that collapsed during the earthquake.

=== San Hua ===
2010, video, 1h 8m

The shooting and editing of this video lasted nearly seven months at the Ai Weiwei studio. It began near the end of 2007 in an interception organized by cat-saving volunteers in Tianjin, and the film locations included Tianjin, Shanghai, Rugao of Jiangsu, Chaoshan of Guangzhou, and Hebei Province. The documentary depicts a complete picture of a chain in the cat-trading industry. Since the end of 2009 when the government began soliciting expert opinion for the Animal Protection Act, the focus of public debate has always been on whether one should be eating cats or not, or whether cat-eating is a Chinese tradition or not. There are even people who would go as far as to say that the call to stop eating cat meat is "imposing the will of the minority on the majority". Yet the "majority" does not understand the complete truth of cat-meat trading chains: cat theft, cat trafficking, killing cats, selling cats, and eating cats, all the various stages of the trade and how they are distributed across the country, in cities such as Beijing, Tianjin, Shanghai, Nanjing, Suzhou, Wuxi, Rugao, Wuhan, Guangzhou, and Hebei. This well-organized, smooth-running industry chain of cat abuse, cat killing and skinning has already existed among ordinary Chinese folks for 20 years, or perhaps even longer. The degree of civilization of a country can be seen from its attitude towards animals.

=== Ordos 100 ===
2011, video, 1h 1m

This documentary is about the construction project curated by Herzog & de Meuron and Ai Weiwei. One hundred architects from 27 countries were chosen to participate and design a 1000 square meter villa to be built in a new community in Inner Mongolia. The 100 villas would be designed to fit a master plan designed by Ai Weiwei. On 25 January 2008, the 100 architects gathered in Ordos for a first site visit. The film Ordos 100 documents the total of three site visits to Ordos, during which time the master plan and design of each villa was completed. As of 2016, the Ordos 100 project remains unrealized.

=== So Sorry ===
2011, video, 54m

As a sequel to Ai Weiwei's film Lao Ma Ti Hua, the film So Sorry (named after the artist's 2009 exhibition in Munich, Germany) shows the beginnings of the tension between Ai Weiwei and the Chinese Government. In Lao Ma Ti Hua, Ai Weiwei travels to Chengdu, Sichuan to attend the trial of the civil rights advocate Tan Zuoren, as a witness. So Sorry shows the investigation led by Ai Weiwei studio to identify the students who died during the Sichuan earthquake as a result of corruption and poor building constructions leading to the confrontation between Ai Weiwei and the Chengdu police. After being beaten by the police, Ai Weiwei traveled to Munich, Germany to prepare his exhibition at the museum Haus der Kunst. The result of his beating led to intense headaches caused by a brain hemorrhage and was treated by emergency surgery. These events mark the beginning of Ai Weiwei's struggle and surveillance at the hands of the state police.

=== Ping'an Yueqing ===
2011, video, 2h 22m

This documentary investigates the death of popular Zhaiqiao village leader Qian Yunhui in the fishing village of Yueqing, Zhejiang province. When the local government confiscated marshlands in order to convert them into construction land, the villagers were deprived of the opportunity to cultivate these lands and be fully self-subsistent. Qian Yunhui, unafraid of speaking up for his villagers, travelled to Beijing several times to report this injustice to the central government. In order to silence him, he was detained by local government repeatedly. On 25 December 2010, Qian Yunhui was hit by a truck and died on the scene. News of the incident and photos of the scene quickly spread over the internet. The local government claimed that Qian Yunhui was the victim of an ordinary traffic accident. This film is an investigation conducted by Ai Weiwei studio into the circumstances of the incident and its connection to the land dispute case, mainly based on interviews of family members, villagers and officials. It is an attempt by Ai Weiwei to establish the facts and find out what really happened on 25 December 2010. During shooting and production, Ai Weiwei studio experienced significant obstruction and resistance from local government. The film crew was followed, sometimes physically stopped from shooting certain scenes and there were even attempts to buy off footage. All villagers interviewed for the purposes of this documentary have been interrogated or illegally detained by local government to some extent.

=== The Crab House ===
2011, video, 1h 1m

Early in 2008, the district government of Jiading, Shanghai invited Ai Weiwei to build a studio in Malu Township, as a part of the local government's efforts in developing its cultural assets. By August 2010, the Ai Weiwei Shanghai Studio completed all of its construction work. In October 2010, the Shanghai government declared the Ai Weiwei Shanghai Studio an illegal construction, and was subjected to demolition. On 7 November 2010, when Ai Weiwei was placed under house arrest by public security in Beijing, over 1,000 netizens attended the "River Crab Feast" at the Shanghai Studio. On 11 January 2011, the Shanghai city government forcibly demolished the Ai Weiwei Studio within a day, without any prior notice.

=== Stay Home ===
2013, video, 1h 17m

This video tells the story of Liu Ximei, who at her birth in 1985 was given to relatives to be raised because she was born in violation of China's strict one-child policy. When she was ten years old, Liu was severely injured while working in the fields and lost large amounts of blood. While undergoing treatment at a local hospital, she was given a blood transfusion that was later revealed to be contaminated with HIV. Following this exposure to the virus, Liu contracted AIDS. According to official statistics, in 2001 there were 850,000 AIDS sufferers in China, many of whom contracted the illness in the 1980s and 1990s as the result of a widespread plasma market operating in rural, impoverished areas and using unsafe collection methods.

=== Ai Weiwei's Appeal ¥15,220,910.50 ===
2014, video, 2h 8m

Ai Weiwei's Appeal ¥15,220,910.50 opens with Ai Weiwei's mother at the Venice Biennial in the summer of 2013 examining Ai's large S.A.C.R.E.D. installation portraying his 81-day imprisonment. The documentary goes onto chronologically reconstruct the events that occurred from the time he was arrested at the Beijing airport in April 2011 to his final court appeal in September 2012. The film portrays the day-to-day activity surrounding Ai Weiwei, his family and his associates ranging from consistent visits by the authorities, interviews with reporters, support and donations from fans, and court dates. The Film premiered at the International Film Festival Rotterdam on 23 January 2014.

=== Fukushima Art Project ===
2015, video, 30m

This documentary on the Fukushima Art Project is about artist Ai Weiwei's investigation of the site as well as the project's installation process. In August 2014, Ai Weiwei was invited as one of the participating artists for the Fukushima Nuclear Zone by the Japanese art coalition Chim↑Pom, as part of the project Don't Follow the Wind . Ai accepted the invitation and sent his assistant Ma Yan to the exclusion zone in Japan to investigate the site. The Fukushima Nuclear Exclusion Zone is thus far located within the 20-kilometer radius of land area of the Fukushima Daiichi Nuclear Power Plant. 25,000 people have already been evacuated from the Exclusion Zone. Both water and electric circuits were cut off. Entrance restriction is expected to be relieved in the next thirty years, or even longer. The art project will also be open to public at that time. The three spots usable as exhibition spaces by the artists are all former residential houses, among which exhibition site one and two were used for working and lodging; and exhibition site three was used as a community entertainment facility with an ostrich farm. Ai brought about two projects, A Ray of Hope and Family Album after analyzing materials and information generated from the site. In A Ray of Hope, a solar photovoltaic system is built on exhibition site one, on the second level of the old warehouse. Integral LED lighting devices are used in the two rooms. The lights would turn on automatically from 7 to 10 pm, and from 6 to 8 am daily. This lighting system is the only light source in the Exclusion Zone after this project was installed. Photos of Ai and his studio staff at Caochangdi that make up project Family Album are displayed on exhibition site two and three, in the seven rooms where locals used to live. The twenty-two selected photos are divided in five categories according to types of event spanning eight years. Among these photos, six of them were taken from the site investigation at the 2008 Sichuan earthquake; two were taken during the time when he was illegally detained after pleading the Tan Zuoren case in Chengdu, China in August 2009; and three others taken during his surgical treatment for his head injury from being attacked in the head by police officers in Chengdu; five taken of him being followed by the police and his Beijing studio Fake Design under surveillance due to the studio tax case from 2011 to 2012; four are photos of Ai Weiwei and his family from year 2011 to year 2013; and the other two were taken earlier of him in his studio in Caochangdi (One taken in 2005 and the other in 2006).

=== Human Flow ===
A feature-length documentary directed by Weiwei and co-produced by Andy Cohen about the global refugee crisis.

=== Coronation ===
A feature-length documentary directed by Weiwei about happenings in Wuhan, China during the global COVID-19 pandemic.

== Visual arts ==
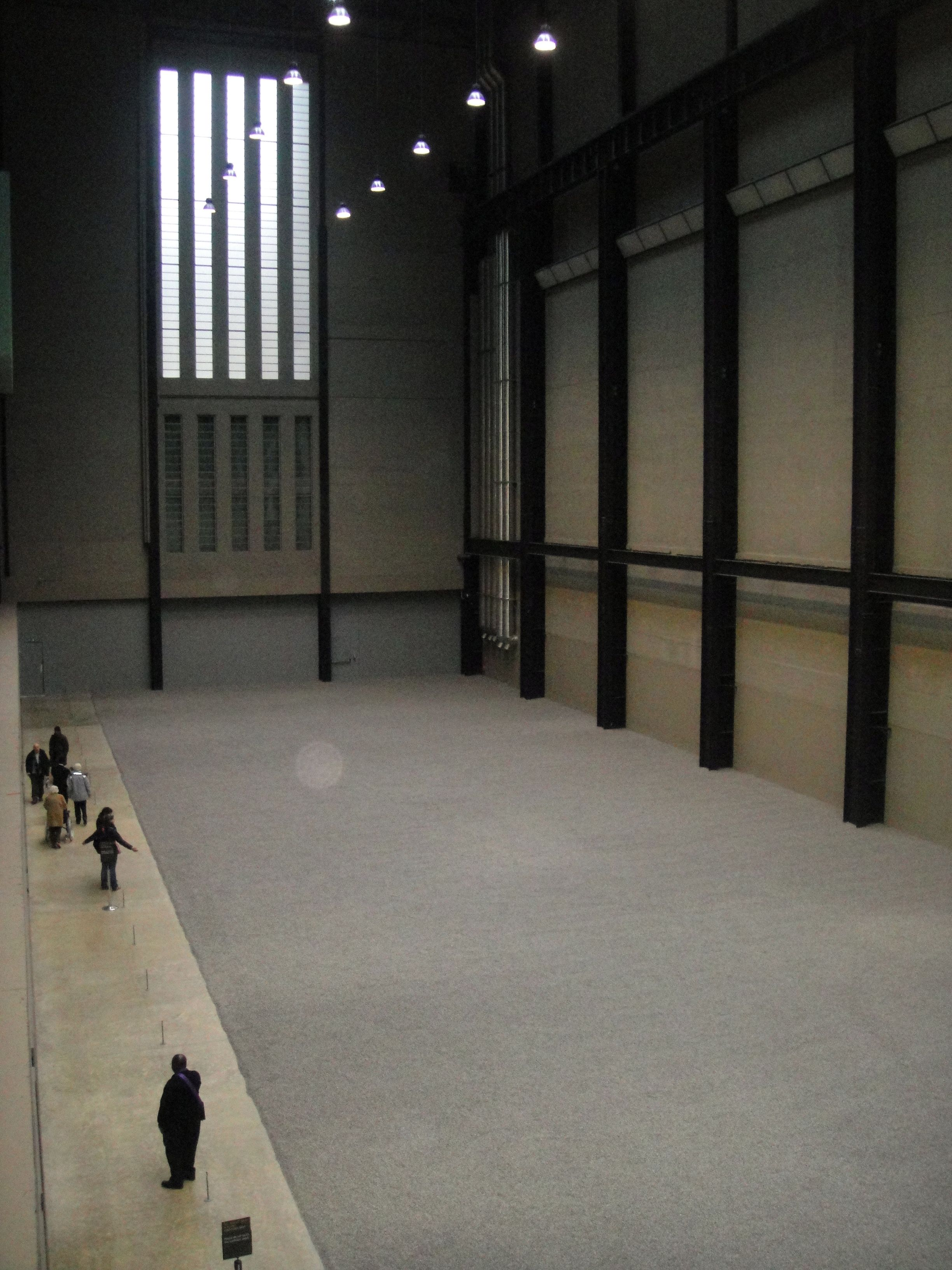
Sunflower Seeds, 2010

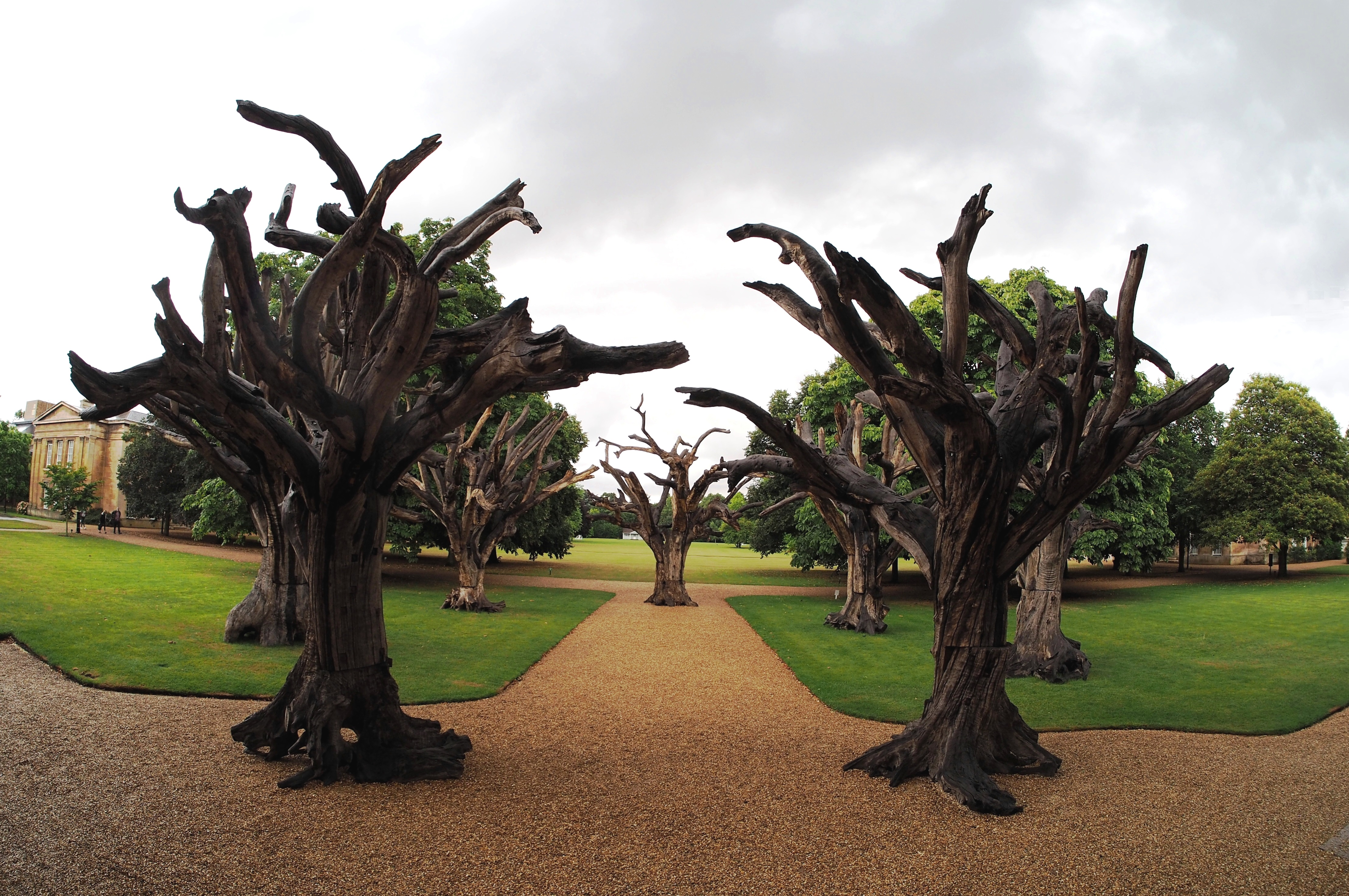
Trees, 2010

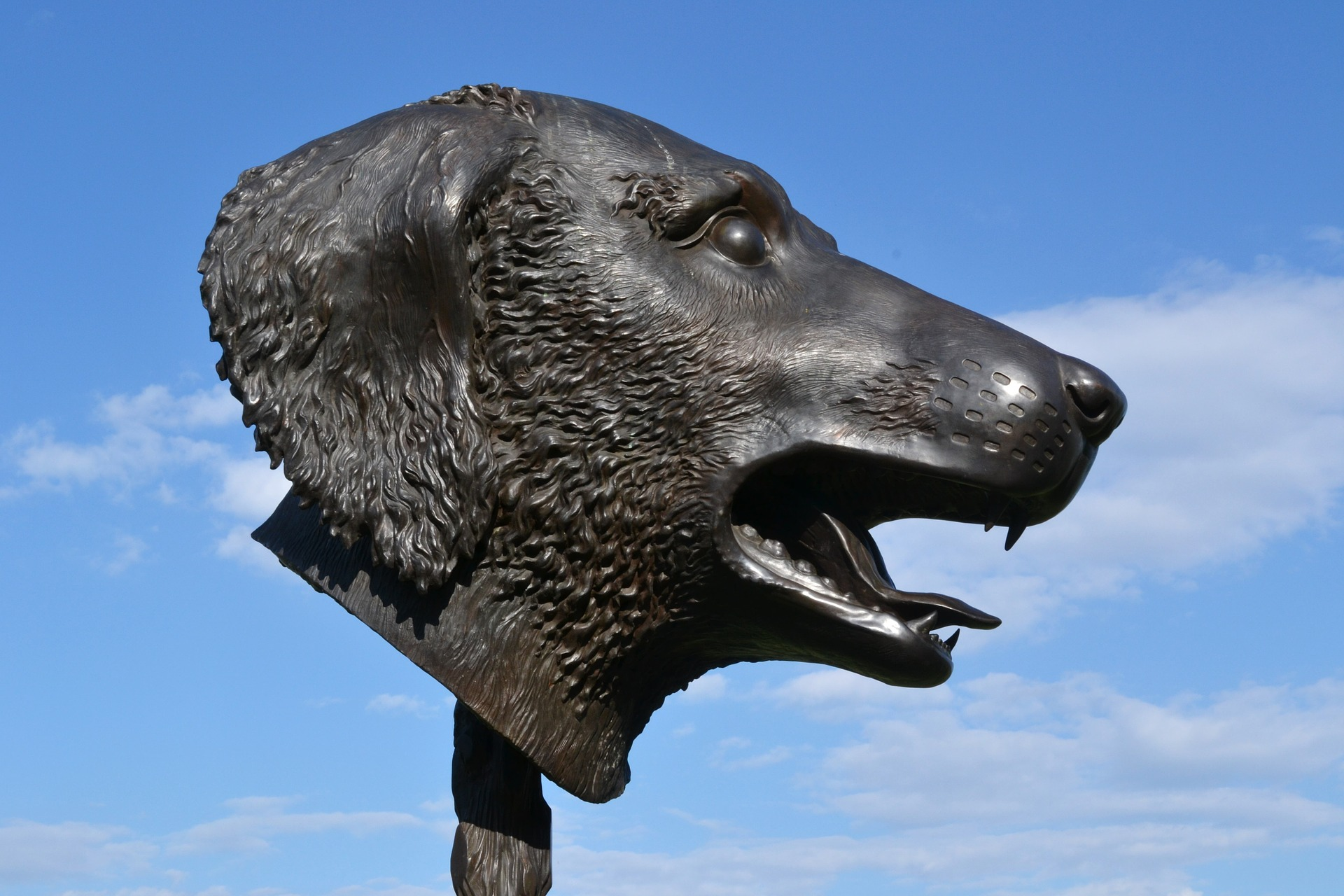
Dog's head sculpture, Circle of Animals/Zodiac Heads, 2011

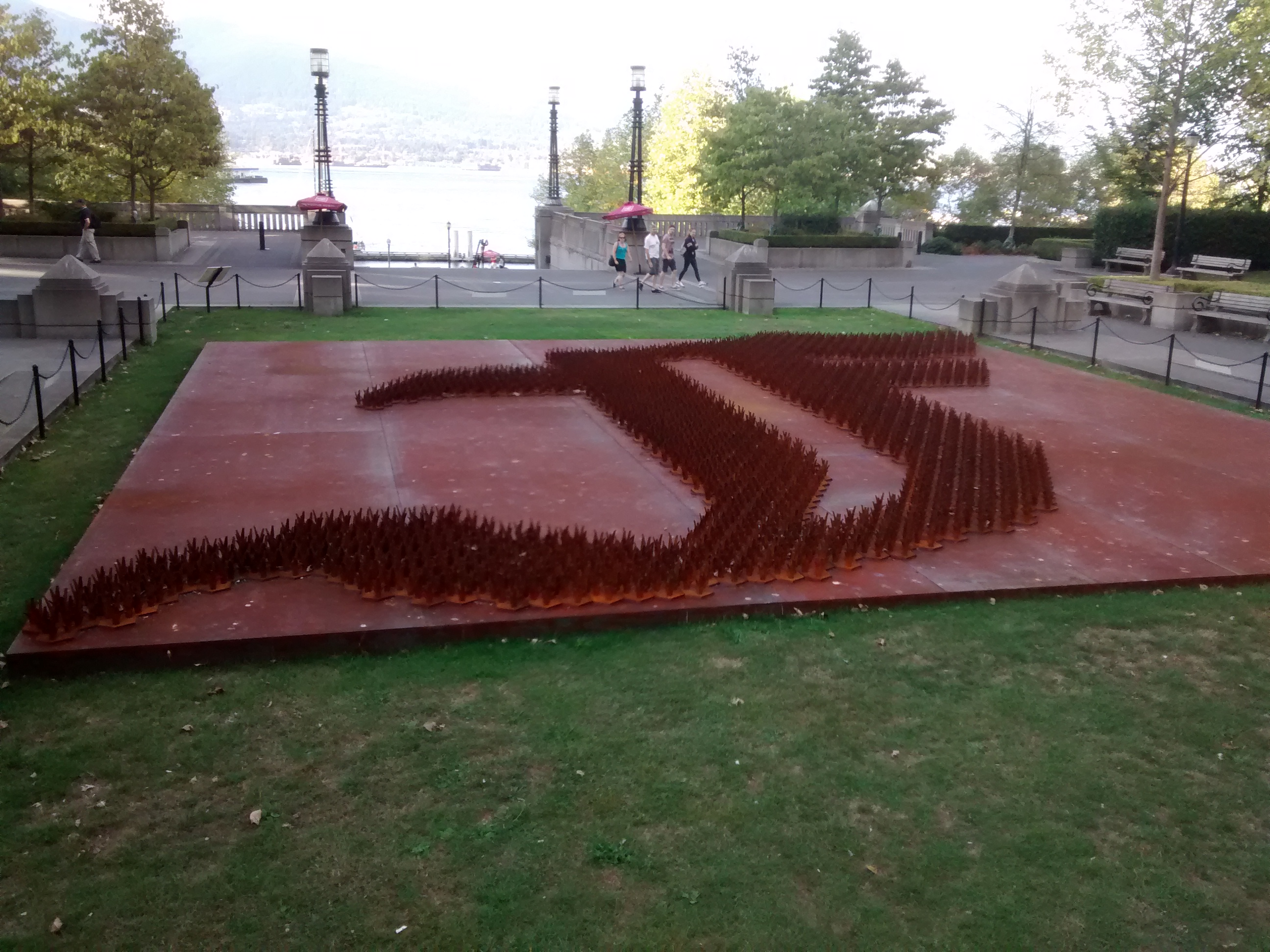
F Grass, 2014

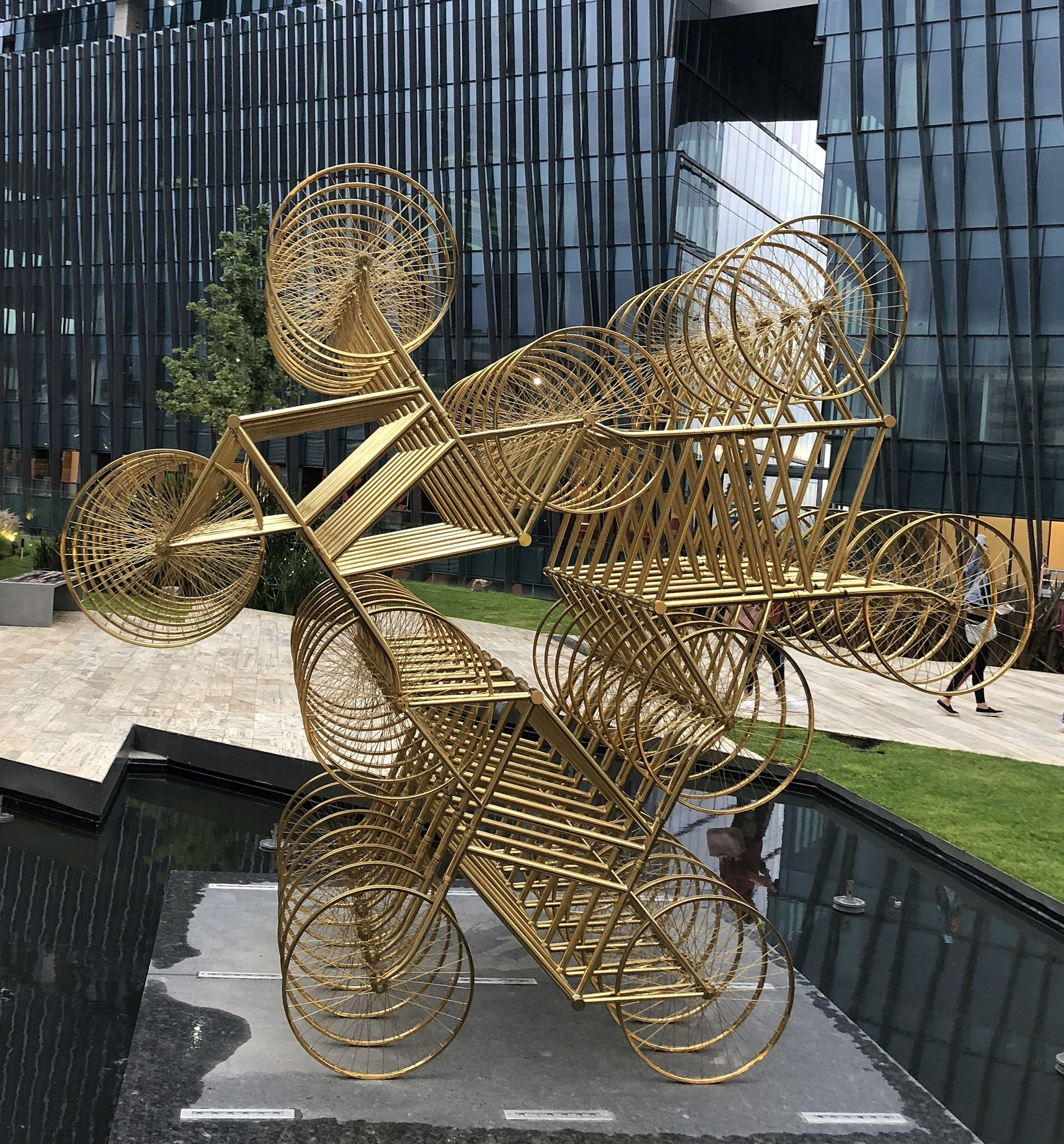
Forever, 2018, Artz Pedregal, Mexico City

Ai's visual art includes sculptural installations, woodworking, video and photography. "Ai Weiwei: According to What," adapted and expanded by the Hirshhorn Museum and Sculpture Garden from a 2009 exhibition at Tokyo's Mori Art Museum, was Ai's first North American museum retrospective. It opened at the Hirshhorn in Washington, D.C., in 2013, and subsequently traveled to the Brooklyn Museum, New York, and two other venues. His works address his investigation into the aftermath of the Sichuan earthquake and responses to the Chinese government's detention and surveillance of him. His recent public pieces have called attention to the Syrian refugee crisis.

=== Dropping a Han Dynasty Urn ===
(1995) Performance in which Ai lets an ancient ceramic urn fall from his hands and smash to pieces on the ground. The performance was memorialized in a series of three photographic still frames.

=== Map of China ===
(2008) Sculpture resembling a park bench or tree trunk, but its cross-section is a map of China. It is four metres long and weighs 635 kilograms. It is made from wood salvaged from Qing Dynasty temples.

=== Table with two legs on the wall ===
(2008) Ming dynasty table cut in half and rejoined at a right angle to rest two feet on the wall and two on the floor. The reconstruction was completed using Chinese period specific joinery techniques.

=== Straight ===
(2008–2012) 150 tons of twisted steel reinforcements recovered from the 2008 Sichuan earthquake building collapse sites were straightened out and displayed on the ground. The sculpture is accompanied by a wall piece that lists the names of 5,000+ children and civilians killed in said earthquake. Displayed as an installation.

=== Sunflower Seeds ===
(2010) Opening in October 2010 at the Tate Museum in London, Ai displayed 100 million handmade and painted porcelain sunflower seeds. The work as installed was called 1-125,000,000 and subsequent installations have been titled Sunflower Seeds. The initial installation had the seeds spread across the floor of the Turbine Hall in a thin 10 cm layer. The seeds weigh about 10 metric tonnes and were made by artisans over two and a half years by 1,600 Jingdezhen artisans in a city where porcelain had been made for Chinese rulers and court for over one thousand years. Made by the traditional method for which the city is known, a thirty-stage process was employed. The sculpture refers to chairman Mao's rule and the Chinese Communist Party. The mass of tiny seeds represents that, together, the people of China can stand up and overthrow the Chinese Communist Party. The seeds also refer to China's current mass-automated production based on Western-style consumerist culture. The sculpture challenges the "Made in China" mantra, memorialising labour-intensive traditional methods of craft objects.

=== Surveillance Camera ===
(2010) Sculptures in marble to resemble the cameras placed in front of Ai's studio.

=== Circle of Animals/Zodiac Heads ===
(2011) Sculptures of zodiac animals inspired by the water clock-fountain at the Old Summer Palace.

=== Coca Cola Vase ===
(2014) Han dynasty vase with the Coca-Cola logo brushed on in red acrylic paint.

=== Grapes ===
(2014) 32 Qing dynasty stools joined together in a cluster with legs pointing out.

=== Free-speech Puzzle ===
(2014) Individual porcelain ornaments, each painted with characters for "free speech", which when set together form a map of China.

=== Trace ===
(2014) Consisting of 176 2D-portraits in Lego which are set onto a large floor space, Trace was commissioned by the FOR-SITE Foundation, the United States National Park Service and the Golden Gate Park Conservancy. The original installation was at Alcatraz Prison in San Francisco Bay; the 176 portraits being of various political prisoners and prisoners of conscience. After seeing one million visitors during its one-year display at Alcatraz, the installation was moved and put on display at the Hirshhorn Museum in Washington, D.C. (in a modified form; the pieces had to be arranged to fit the circular floor space). The display at the Hirshhorn ran from 28 June 2017 – 1 January 2018. The display also included two versions of his wallpaper work The Animal That Looks Like a Llama but Is Really an Alpaca and a video running on a loop.

=== Law of the Journey ===
(2017) As the culmination of Ai's experiences visiting 40 refugee camps in 2016, Law of the Journey featured an all-black, 230-foot-long (70 m) inflatable boat carrying 258 faceless refugee figures. The art piece is currently on display at the National Gallery in Prague until 7 January 2018.

=== Two Iron Trees at The Shrine of Book ===
(2017) Permanent exhibit, unique setting of two Iron Trees from now on frame the Shrine of the Book in Jerusalem, Israel where Dead Sea Scrolls are preserved.

=== Journey of Laziz ===
(2017) The exhibition was on the view in the Israel Museum until the end of October 2017. Journey of Laziz is a video installation, showing mental breakdown and overall suffering of tiger living in the "world's worst ZOO" in Gaza.

=== Hansel and Gretel ===
(2017) The exhibition at the Park Avenue Armory from 7 June- 6 August 2017, Hansel and Gretel was an installation exploring the theme of surveillance. The project, a collaboration of Ai Weiwei and architects Jacques Herzog and Pierre de Meuron, features surveillance cameras equipped with facial recognition software, near-infrared floor projections, tethered, autonomous drones and sonar beacons. A companion website includes a curatorial statement, artist biographies, a livestream of the installation and a timeline of surveillance technology from ancient to modern times.

=== The Animal That Looks Like a Llama but Is Really an Alpaca ===
(2017) The Animal That Looks Like a Llama but Is Really an Alpaca, and its companion piece The Plain Version of The Animal That Looks Like a Llama but Is Really an Alpaca, is a wallpaper work consisting of intricate tiled patterns showing various pieces of surveillance equipment in whimsical arrangements. The two pieces were installed at the Hirshhorn Museum in Washington, D.C., as part of a full-floor exhibition of his work that also included a video and the 2014 installation Trace.

=== man in a cube ===
(2017) Ai Weiwei created the sculpture man in a cube for the exhibition Luther and the Avantgarde in Wittenberg to mark the 2017 quincentenary of the Reformation. In it, the artist worked through his experiences of anxiety and isolation following his arrest by Chinese authorities: “My work is physically a concrete block, which contains within it a single figure in solitude. That figure is the likeness of myself during my eighty-one days under secret detention in 2011.” Concentrating on ideas and language helped Ai Weiwei endure his imprisonment. He was also intrigued by the connectedness of freedom, language and ideas in Martin Luther, to whom he explicitly paid tribute with man in a cube. Once the exhibition in Wittenberg closed, the Stiftung Lutherhaus Eisenach endeavored to make this exceptional manifestation of contemporary Reformation commemoration, man in a cube, permanently accessible to a wide audience. Thanks to the generous support of numerous backers, the museum managed to acquire the sculpture in 2019. It was erected in the courtyard of the Lutherhaus and presented to the public in a ceremony the following year, the five hundredth anniversary of the publication of Martin Luther's treatise On the Freedom of a Christian.

=== Good Fences Make Good Neighbors ===
Ai Weiwei's 2017–18 New York City-wide public art exhibition.

=== Forever Bicycles ===
Forever Bicycles is a 32-foot (9.8 m) sculpture of 1,300 bicycles in Austin, Texas, which was installed in 2017.

=== Forever ===
A sculpture of many bicycles is displayed as public art in the gardens of the Artz Pedregal shopping mall in Mexico City since its opening in March 2018.

=== Priceless ===
A collaboration with conceptual artist Kevin Abosch primarily made up of two standard ERC-20 tokens on the Ethereum blockchain, called PRICELESS (PRCLS is its symbol). One of these tokens is forever unavailable to anyone, but the other is meant for distribution and is divisible up to 18 decimal places, meaning it can be given away one quintillionth at a time. A nominal amount of the distributable token was “burned” (put into digital wallets with the keys thrown away), and these wallet addresses were printed on paper and sold to art buyers in a series of 12 physical works. Each wallet address alphanumeric is a proxy for a shared moment between Abosch and Ai.

== Architecture ==
Ai Weiwei is also a notable architect known for his collaborations with Herzog & de Meuron and Wang Shu. In 2005, Ai was invited by Wang Shu as an external teacher of the Architecture Department of China Academy of Art.

=== Jinhua Park ===
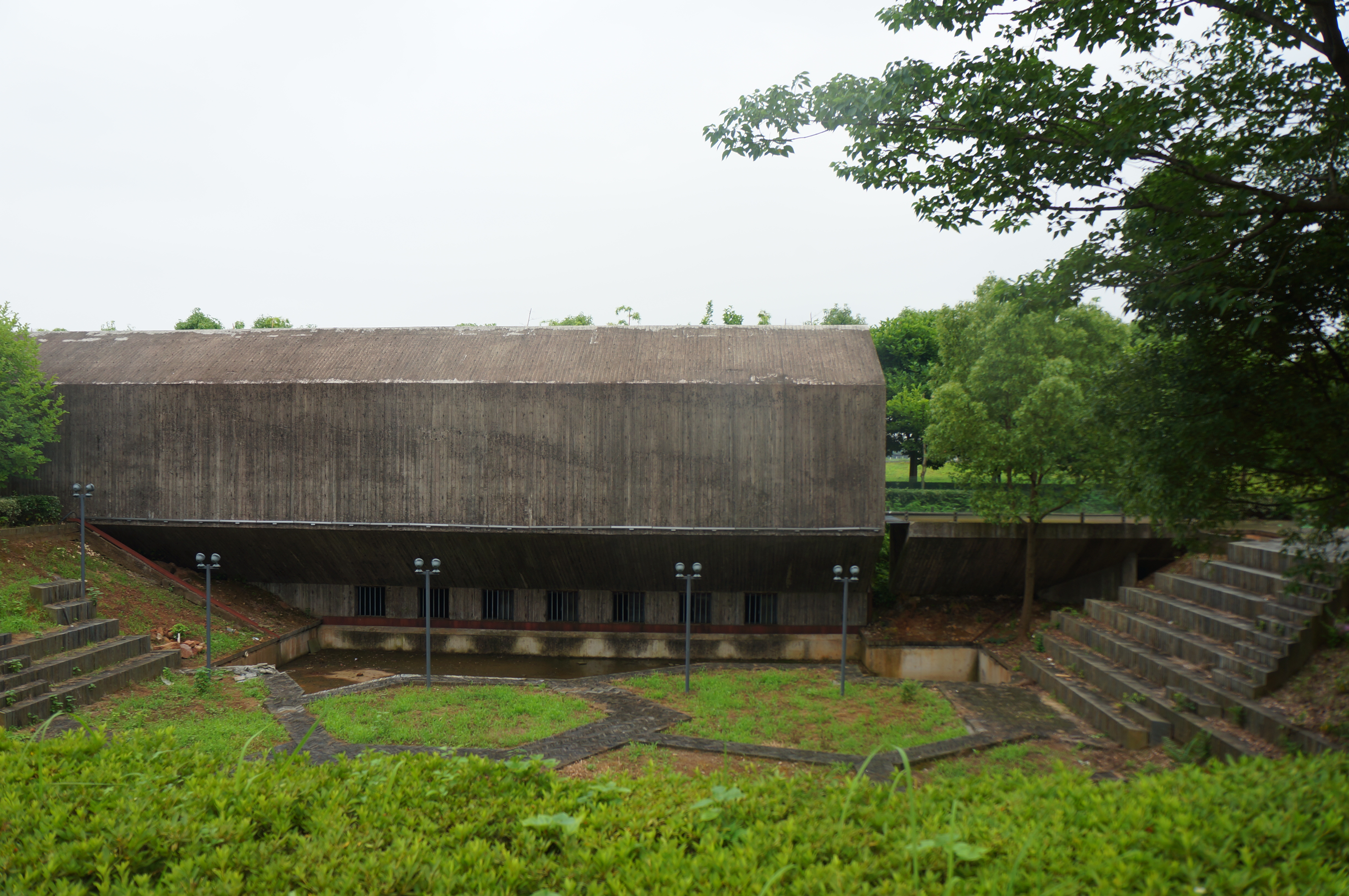
"Archaeological Archives" designed by Ai Weiwei inside the Jinhua Architecture Park.

In 2002, he was the curator of the project Jinhua Architecture Park.

=== Tsai Residence ===
In 2006, Ai and HHF Architects designed a private residence in upstate New York. According to The New York Times, the Tsai Residence is divided into four modules and the details are "extraordinarily refined". In 2009, the Chicago Athenaeum Museum of Architecture and Design selected the home for its International Architecture Awards, one of the world's most prestigious global awards for new architecture, landscape architecture, interiors and urban planning. In 2010, Wallpaper magazine nominated the residence for its Wallpaper Design Awards category: Best New Private House. A detached guesthouse, also designed by Ai and HHF Architects, was completed after the main house and, according to New York Magazine, looks like a "floating boomerang of rusty Cor-Ten steel."

=== Ordos 100 ===
In 2008, Ai curated the architecture project Ordos 100 in Ordos City, Inner Mongolia. He invited 100 architects from 29 countries to participate in this project.

=== Beijing National Stadium ===
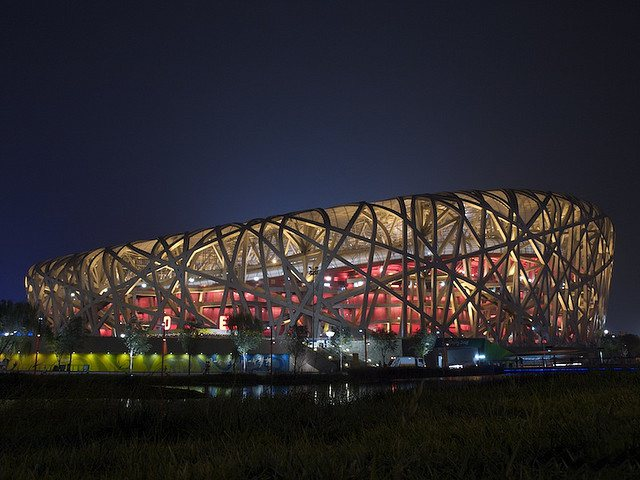
The Beijing National Stadium at night during the 2008 Summer Olympics

Ai was commissioned as the artistic consultant for design, collaborating with the Swiss firm Herzog & de Meuron, for the Beijing National Stadium for the 2008 Summer Olympics, also known as the "Bird's Nest." Although ignored by the Chinese media, he had voiced his anti-Olympics views. He later distanced himself from the project, saying, "I've already forgotten about it. I turn down all the demands to have photographs with it," saying it is part of a "pretend smile" of bad taste. In August 2007, he also accused those choreographing the Olympic opening ceremony, including Steven Spielberg and Zhang Yimou, of failing to live up to their responsibility as artists. Ai said "It's disgusting. I don't like anyone who shamelessly abuses their profession, who makes no moral judgment." In February 2008, Spielberg withdrew from his role as advisor to the 2008 Summer Olympics. When asked why he participated in the designing of the Bird's Nest in the first place, Ai replied "I did it because I love design."

=== Serpentine Pavilion ===
In summer 2012, Ai teamed again with Herzog & de Meuron on a "would-be archaeological site [as] a game of make-believe and fleeting memory" as the year's temporary Serpentine Gallery Pavilion in London's Kensington Gardens.

== Books ==
=== Venice Elegy ===
This edition of Yang Lian's poems and Ai Weiwei's visual images was realized by the publishing house Damocle Edizioni – Venice in 200 numbered copies on Fabriano Paper. The book was printed with the Printing Press at the Stamperia del Tintoretto di Venezia – Venice, May 2018. Every book is hand signed by Yang Lian and Ai Weiwei.

=== Traces of Survival ===
In December 2014 Ruya Foundation for Contemporary Culture in Iraq provided drawing materials to three refugee camps in Iraq: Camp Shariya, Camp Baharka and Mar Elia Camp. Ruya Foundation collected over 500 submissions. A number of these images were then selected by Ai Weiwei for a major publication, Traces of Survival: Drawings by Refugees in Iraq selected by Ai Weiwei, that was published to coincide with the Iraq Pavilion at the 56th Venice Biennale.

=== 1000 Years of Joys and Sorrows ===
- 1000 Years of Joys and Sorrows

== Music ==
On 24 October 2012, Ai went live with a cover of Gangnam Style, the famous K-pop phenomenon by South Korean rapper PSY, through the posting of a four-minute long parody video on YouTube. The video was an attempt to criticize the Chinese government's attempt to silence his activism and was quickly blocked by national authorities.

On 22 May 2013, Ai debuted his first single Dumbass over the internet, with a music video shot by cinematographer Christopher Doyle. The video was a reconstruction of Ai's experience in prison, during his 81-day detention, and dives in and out of the prison's reality and the guarding soldiers' fantasies. He later released a second single, Laoma Tihua, on 20 June 2013 along with a video on his experience of state surveillance, with footage compiled from his studio's documentaries. On 22 June 2013, the second anniversary of Ai's release, he released his first music album The Divine Comedy. Later in August, he released a third music video for the song Chaoyang Park, also included in the album.

== Other engagements ==
Ai is the Artistic Director of China Art Archives & Warehouse (CAAW), which he co-founded in 1997. This contemporary art archive and experimental gallery in Beijing concentrates on experimental art from the People's Republic of China, initiates and facilitates exhibitions and other forms of introductions inside and outside China. The building which houses it was designed by Ai in 2000.

On 15 March 2010, Ai took part in Digital Activism in China, a discussion hosted by The Paley Media Center in New York with Jack Dorsey (founder of Twitter) and Richard MacManus. Also in 2010 he served as jury member for Future Generation Art Prize, Kiev, Ukraine; contributed design for Comme de Garcons Aoyama Store, Tokyo, Japan; and participated in a talk with Nobel Prize winner Herta Müller at the International Culture festival lit.COLOGNE in Cologne, Germany.

In 2011, Ai sat on the jury of an international initiative to find a universal Logo for Human Rights. The winning design, combining the silhouette of a hand with that of a bird, was chosen from more than 15,300 suggestions from over 190 countries. The initiative's goal was to create an internationally recognized logo to support the global human rights movement.[98] In 2013, after the existence of the PRISM surveillance program was revealed, Ai said "Even though we know governments do all kinds of things I was shocked by the information about the US surveillance operation, Prism. To me, it's abusively using government powers to interfere in individuals' privacy. This is an important moment for international society to reconsider and protect individual rights."[99]

In 2012, Ai interviewed a member of the 50 Cent Party, a group of "online commentators" (otherwise known as sockpuppets) covertly hired by the Chinese government to post "comments favourable towards party policies and [intending] to shape public opinion on internet message boards and forums". Keeping Ai's source anonymous, the transcript was published by the British magazine New Statesman on 17 October 2012, offering insights on the education, life, methods and tactics used by professional trolls serving pro-government interests.

Ai designed the cover for 17 June 2013 issue of Time magazine. The cover story, by Hannah Beech, is "How China Sees the World". TIME Magazine called it "the most beautiful cover we've ever done in our history."

In 2011, Ai served as co-director and curator of the 2011 Gwangju Design Biennale, and co-curator of the exhibition Shanshui at The Museum of Art Lucerne. Also in 2011, Ai spoke at TED (conference) and was a guest lecturer at Oslo School of Architecture and Design.

In 2013, Ai became a Reporters Without Borders ambassador. He also gave a hundred pictures to the NGO in order to release a Photo book and a digital album, both sold in order to fund freedom of information projects.

In 2014–2015, Ai explored human rights and freedom of expression through an exhibition of his art exclusively created for Alcatraz, a notorious federal penitentiary in San Francisco Bay. Ai's @Large exhibit raised questions and contradictions about human rights and the freedom of expression through his artwork at the island's layered legacy as a 19th-century military fortress. Chinese artist and activist Ai Weiwei has used thousands of life jackets in two different installation to draw attention to refugees who have drowned while trying to reach Europe.

In February 2016, Ai WeiWei attached 14,000 bright orange life jackets to the columns of the Konzerthaus in Berlin. The life jackets had been discarded by refugees arriving on the shore on the Greek island of Lesbos. Later that year, he installed a different piece, also using discarded life jackets, at the pond at the Belvedere Palace in Vienna.
