= Ai Weiwei =

Chinese conceptual artist and dissident (born 1957)

- 艾未未
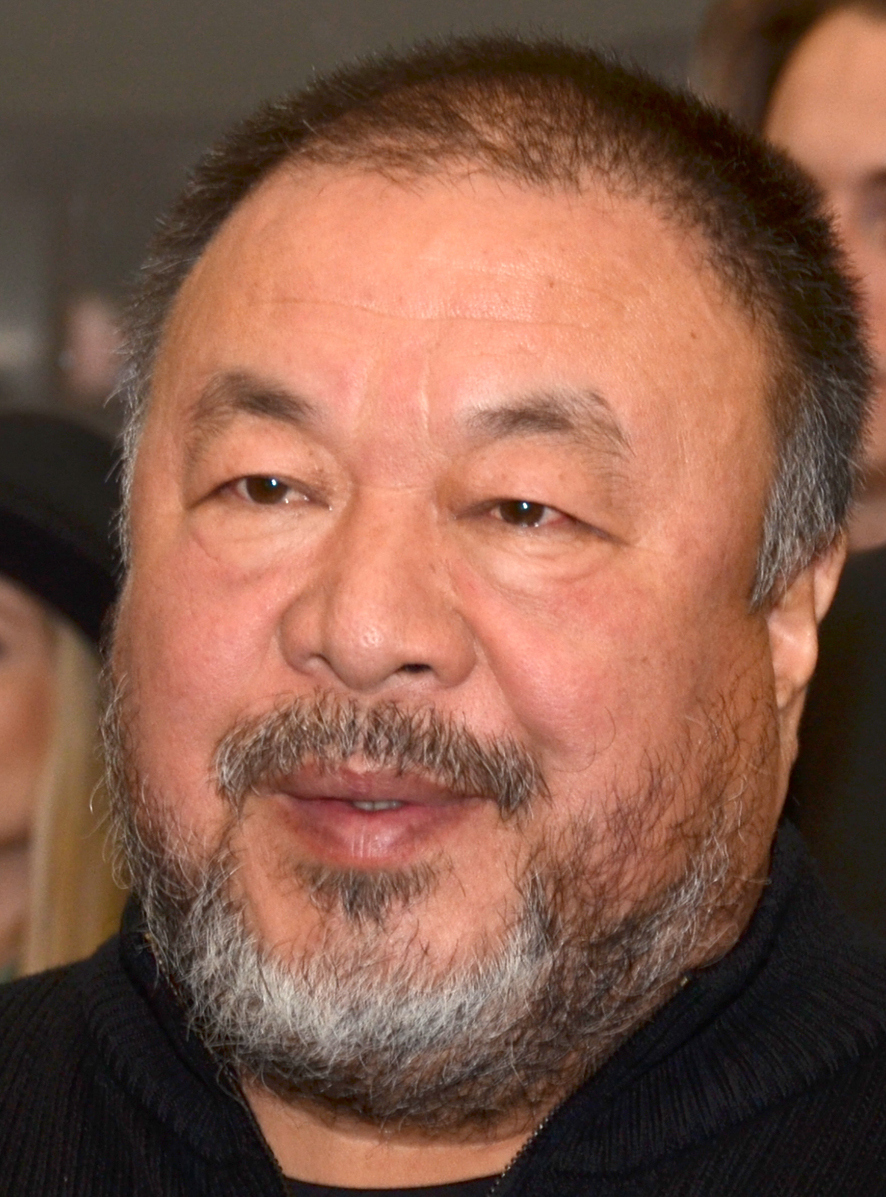
- Ai in 2017
- Born: 28 August 1957 (age 69); Beijing, China
- Notable work: Sunflower Seeds; Beijing National Stadium
- Movement: Excessivism
- Spouse: Lu Qing
- Father: Ai Qing
- Ai Weiwei's voice On the social responsibility of artists

Chinese name
- Chinese: 艾未未
Transcriptions
Standard Mandarin
- Hanyu Pinyin: Ài Wèiwèi
- Wade–Giles: Ai^{4} Wei^{4}-wei^{4}
- IPA: [âɪ wêɪ.wêɪ]
Yue: Cantonese
- Yale Romanization: Ngaaih Meih-meih
- Website: www.aiweiwei.com

Ai Weiwei (/ˈaɪ weɪˈweɪ/ EYE way-WAY; Chinese: 艾未未; pinyin: Ài Wèiwèi, IPA: [âɪ wêɪ.wêɪ]; born 28 August 1957) is a Chinese contemporary artist, documentarian and activist. Ai grew up in the far northwest of China, where he lived under harsh conditions due to his father's exile. As an activist, he has been openly critical of the Chinese government and its stance on democracy and human rights. He investigated government corruption and cover-ups, in particular the Sichuan schools corruption scandal following the collapse of "tofu-dreg schools" in the 2008 Sichuan earthquake. In April 2011, Ai Weiwei was arrested at Beijing Capital International Airport for "economic crimes", and detained for 81 days without charge. Ai Weiwei emerged as a figure in Chinese cultural development, an architect of Chinese modernism, and a prominent political commentator.

Ai Weiwei has created political sculptures, photographs, and public works. Since being allowed to leave China in 2015, he has lived in Portugal, Germany, and the United Kingdom.

== Life ==
=== Early life and work ===
Ai's father was the Chinese poet Ai Qing, who was denounced during the Anti-Rightist Movement. In 1958, the family was sent to a labour camp in Beidahuang, Heilongjiang, when Ai was one year old. They were subsequently exiled to Shihezi, Xinjiang, in 1961, where they lived for 16 years. Upon Mao Zedong's death and the end of the Cultural Revolution, the family returned to Beijing in 1976.

Weiwei notes this exile as "the whirlpool that swallowed up my father upended my life too, leaving a mark on me that I carry to this day."

In 1978, Ai enrolled in the Beijing Film Academy and studied animation. In 1978, he was one of the founders of the early avant-garde art group the "Stars", together with Ma Desheng, Wang Keping, Mao Lizi, Huang Rui, Li Shuang, Ah Cheng and Qu Leilei. The group disbanded in 1983, yet Ai participated in regular Stars group shows, The Stars: Ten Years, 1989 (Hanart Gallery, Hong Kong and Taipei), and a retrospective exhibition in Beijing in 2007: Origin Point (Today Art Museum, Beijing).

=== Life in the United States ===
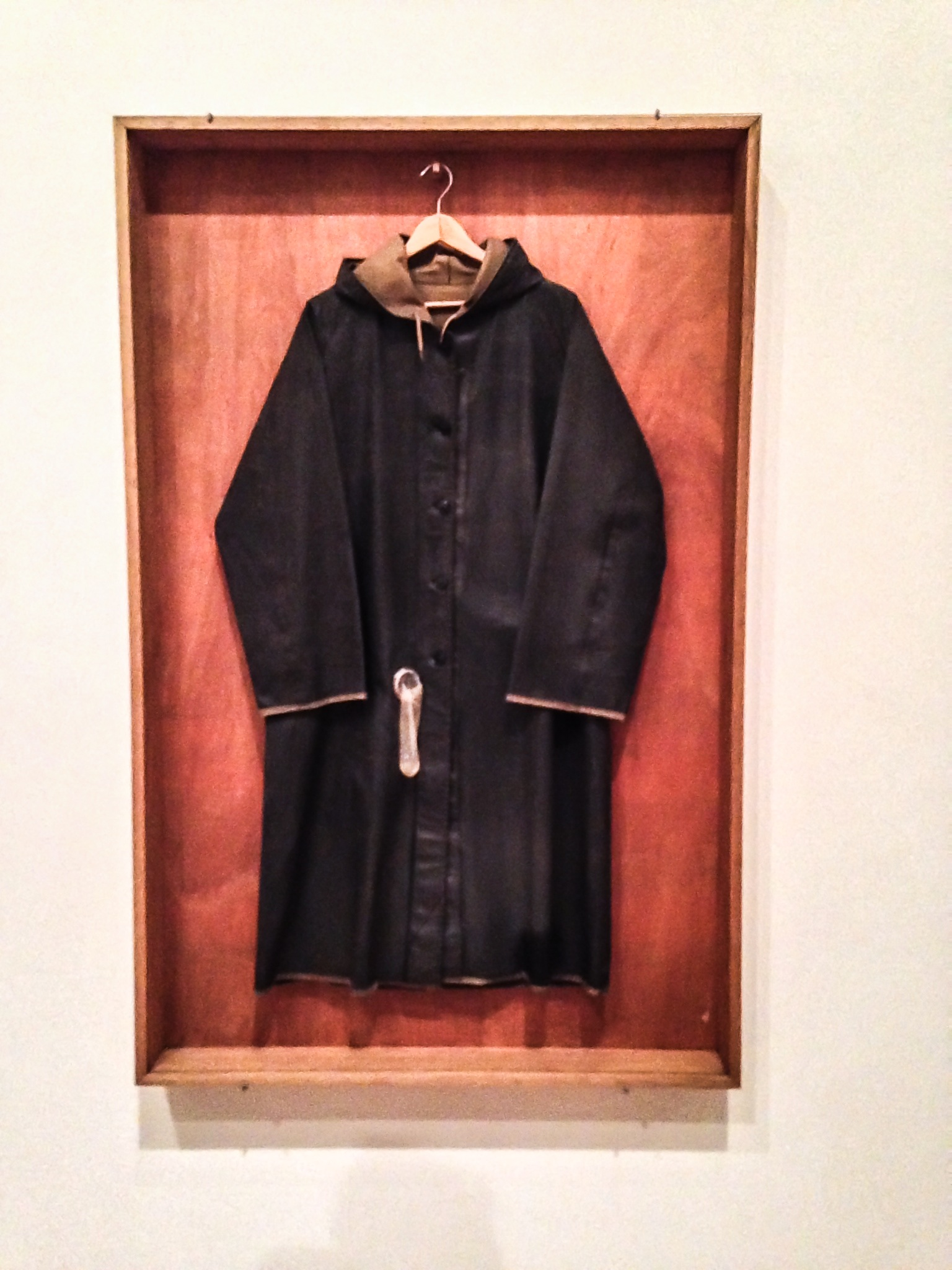
This raincoat has a hole near the waist which is covered with a condom. The work is intended to describe the AIDS crisis as Ai saw it in New York City.

From 1981 to 1993, he lived in the United States. He was among the first generation of students to study abroad following China's reform in 1980, being one of the 161 students to take the TOEFL (Test of English as a Foreign Language) in 1981. For the first few years, Ai lived in Philadelphia and San Francisco. He studied English at the University of Pennsylvania and the Berkeley Adult School. Later, he moved to New York City. He studied briefly at Parsons School of Design. Ai attended the Art Students League of New York from 1983 to 1986, where he studied with Bruce Dorfman, Knox Martin and Richard Pousette-Dart. He later dropped out of school and made a living out of drawing street portraits and working odd jobs. During this period, he gained exposure to the works of Marcel Duchamp, Andy Warhol, and Jasper Johns, and began creating conceptual art by altering readymade objects.

Ai befriended beat poet Allen Ginsberg while living in New York, following a chance meeting at a poetry reading where Ginsberg read out several poems about China. Ginsberg had traveled to China and met with Ai's father, the noted poet Ai Qing, and consequently Ginsberg and Ai became friends.

When he was living in the East Village from 1983 to 1993, Ai carried a camera with him all the time and would take pictures of his surroundings wherever he was. The resulting collection of photos were later selected and is now known as New York Photographs 1983–1993. At the same time, Ai became fascinated by blackjack card games and frequented Atlantic City casinos. He is still regarded in gambling circles as a top tier professional blackjack player according to an article published on blackjackchamp.com.

=== Return to China ===
In 1993, Ai returned to China after his father became ill. He helped establish the experimental artists' Beijing East Village and co-published a series of three books about this new generation of artists with Chinese curator Feng Boyi: Black Cover Book (1994), White Cover Book (1995), and Gray Cover Book (1997).

In 1999, Ai moved to Caochangdi, in the northeast of Beijing, and built a studio house—his first architectural project. Due to his interest in architecture, he founded the architecture studio FAKE Design, in 2003. In 2000, he co-curated the art exhibition Fuck Off with curator Feng Boyi in Shanghai, China.

=== Life in Europe ===
In 2011, Ai was arrested in China on charges of tax evasion, jailed for 81 days, and then released. The government had confiscated his passport and refused him any other travel papers. Following the return of his passport in 2015, Ai moved to Berlin where he maintained a large studio in a former brewery. He lived in the studio and used it as the base for his international work. In 2019, he announced he would be leaving Berlin, saying that Germany is not an open culture. In September 2019, he moved to live in Cambridge, England.

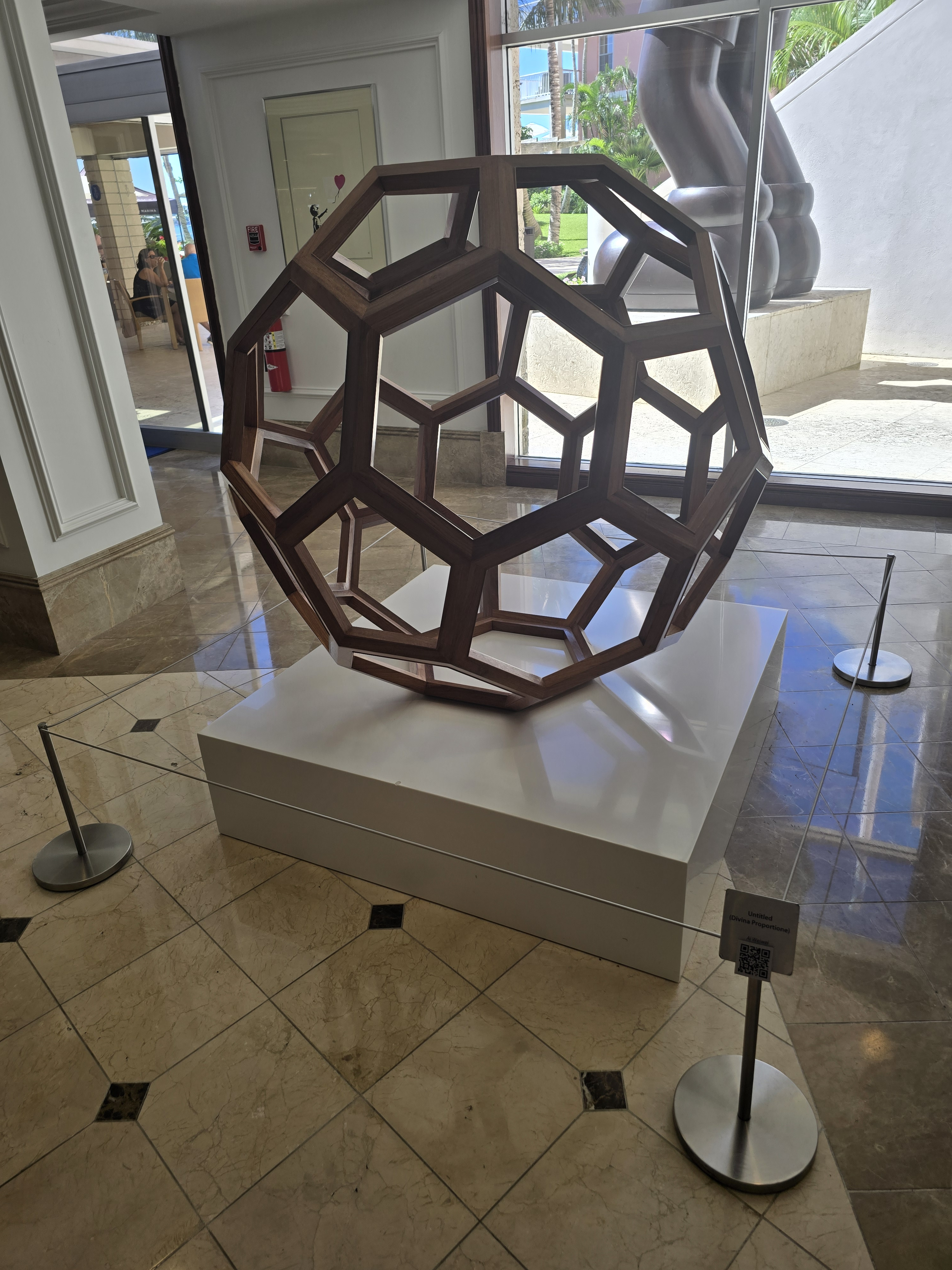
Ai WeiWei's Divina Proportione, Hamilton Princess & Beach Club, Hamilton, Bermuda

As of 2023, Ai lives in Montemor-o-Novo, Portugal. He still maintains a base in Cambridge, where his son attends school, and a studio in Berlin. Ai says he will stay in Portugal long-term "unless something happens". He briefly returned to China in late 2025-early 2026 to visit his mother, and did not encounter any persecution. In an interview with The Guardian about the trip, he criticised about what he thought is the same kind of censorship in European countries. In the same interview, he revealed he did not renounce his Chinese nationality.

Ai sits on the Board of Advisors for the Committee for Freedom in Hong Kong (CFHK).

== Personal life ==
Ai is married to artist Lu Qing. He has a son, Ai Lao, born in 2009 with filmmaker Wang Fen. Ai is fond of cats.

== Political activity and controversies ==
=== Internet activities ===
In 2005, Ai was invited to start blogging by Sina Weibo, the biggest internet platform in China. He posted his first blog on 19 November. For four years, he "turned out a steady stream of scathing social commentary, criticism of government policy, thoughts on art and architecture, and autobiographical writings." The blog was shut down by Sina on 28 May 2009. Ai then turned to Twitter and wrote prolifically on the platform, claiming at least eight hours online every day. He wrote almost exclusively in Chinese using the account @aiww. As of 31 December 2013, Ai has declared that he would stop tweeting but the account remains active in forms of retweets and Instagram posts. In 2013, Dale Eisinger of Complex ranked Ai's blog as the fourth greatest work of performance art ever, with the writer arguing, "Much in the way early performance artists documented with film and video, Ai used the prevalent medium of his time—the web—to examine the increasingly fine line between public life and the artist's work. Ai here used his presence to create something full and tangible rather than just a symbolic representation of his critique." In 2023, he created a mobile app which gives users a picture of Ai's own middle finger which they can insert over another image of any place on earth (from Google Earth) which they disapprove of.

=== Citizens' investigation on Sichuan earthquake student casualties ===
Ten days after the 8.0-magnitude earthquake in Sichuan province on 12 May 2008, Ai led a team to survey and film the post-quake conditions in various disaster zones. In response to the government's lack of transparency in revealing names of students who perished in the earthquake due to substandard school campus constructions, Ai recruited volunteers online and launched a "Citizens' Investigation" to compile names and information of the student victims. On 20 March 2009, he posted a blog titled "Citizens' Investigation" and wrote: "To remember the departed, to show concern for life, to take responsibility, and for the potential happiness of the survivors, we are initiating a 'Citizens' Investigation.' We will seek out the names of each departed child, and we will remember them."

As of 14 April 2009, the list had accumulated 5,385 names. Ai published the collected names as well as numerous articles documenting the investigation on his blog, which was shut down by Chinese authorities in May 2009. He also posted his list of names of schoolchildren who died on the wall of his office at FAKE Design in Beijing.

Ai suffered headaches and claimed he had difficulty concentrating on his work since returning from Chengdu in August 2009, where he was beaten by the police for trying to testify for Tan Zuoren, a fellow investigator of the shoddy construction and student casualties in the earthquake. On 14 September 2009, Ai was diagnosed to be suffering internal bleeding in a hospital in Munich, Germany, and the doctor arranged for emergency brain surgery. The cerebral hemorrhage is believed to be linked to the police attack.

According to the Financial Times, in an attempt to force Ai to leave the country, two accounts used by him had been hacked in a sophisticated attack on Google in China dubbed Operation Aurora, their contents read and copied; his bank accounts were investigated by state security agents who claimed he was under investigation for "unspecified suspected crimes".

=== Shanghai studio controversy ===
Ai was placed under house arrest in November 2010 by the Chinese police. He said this was to prevent the planned party marking the demolition of his brand new Shanghai studio.

The building was designed by Ai himself with assistance, and potency coming from a "high official [from Shanghai]" the new studio was a part of a new traditional design by Shanghai Municipal jurisdiction. He was going to use it as a studio and mentor different architecture courses. After Ai was charged with constructing the studio without the required approval and the knockdown notice had been processed, Ai said officials had been anxious and the paperwork and planning process was "under government supervision". According to Ai, a few different artists were invited to create and structure new studios in this area of Shanghai because officials wanted to create a friendly environment.

Ai stated on 3 November 2010 that authorities had let him know two months earlier that the newly completed studio would be knocked down because it was illegal and did not meet the needs. Ai criticized that this was biased, stating that he was "the only one singled out to have my studio destroyed". The Guardian reported Ai saying Shanghai municipal authorities were "upset" by documentaries on subjects they considered delicate—in particular a documentary featuring Shanghai resident Feng Zhenghu, who lived in forced separation for three months in Narita Airport, Tokyo, and one focused on Yang Jia, who murdered six Shanghai police officers.

At the end of the term, the gathering took place without Ai. All of his fans had a river crab, an allusion to "harmony", and a euphemism used to jeer official censorship. Ai was eventually released from house arrest the next day.

Like other activists and intellectuals, Ai was stopped from leaving China in late 2010. Ai suggested that the higher ups wanted to stop him from attending a ceremony in December 2010 to award the 2010 Nobel Peace Prize to fellow dissident Liu Xiaobo. Ai said that he was never invited to the ceremony and was attempting to travel to South Korea where he had an important meeting when he was told that he could not leave for reasons of national security.

On 11 January 2011, Ai's studio was knocked down and destroyed in a surprise move by the government, who had previously told him the studio would be destroyed only after the beginning of the New Year on 3 February 2011.

=== 2011 arrest ===
On 3 April 2011, Ai was arrested at Beijing Capital International Airport just before catching a flight to Hong Kong and his studio facilities were searched. A police contingent of approximately 50 officers came to his studio, threw a cordon around it and searched the premises. They took away laptops and the hard drive from the main computer; along with Ai, police also detained eight staff members and Ai's wife, Lu Qing. Police also visited the mother of Ai's two-year-old son. The Chinese Ministry of Foreign Affairs said on 7 April that Ai was arrested under investigation for alleged economic crimes. Then, on 8 April, police returned to Ai's workshop to examine his financial affairs. Ai's assistant Wen Tao, studio partner Liu Zhenggang and driver Zhang Jingsong were also detained following Ai's arrest. Ai's wife said that she was summoned by the Beijing Chaoyang district tax bureau, where she was interrogated about his studio's tax on 12 April. South China Morning Post reports that Ai received at least two visits from the police, the last being on 31 March—three days before his detention—apparently with offers of membership to the Chinese People's Political Consultative Conference. A staff member recalled that Ai had mentioned receiving the offer earlier, "[but Ai] didn't say if it was a membership of the CPPCC at the municipal or national level, how he responded or whether he accepted it or not."

On 24 February, amid an online campaign for Middle East-style protests in major Chinese cities by overseas dissidents, Ai posted on his Twitter account: "I didn't care about jasmine at first, but people who are scared by jasmine sent out information about how harmful jasmine is often, which makes me realize that jasmine is what scares them the most. What a jasmine!"

==== Response to Ai's arrest ====
Analysts and other activists said Ai had been widely thought to be untouchable, but Nicholas Bequelin from Human Rights Watch suggested that his arrest was calculated to send a message that no one is immune and that the arrest must have had the approval of someone in the top leadership. International governments, human rights groups and art institutions, among others, called for Ai's release, while Chinese officials did not notify Ai's family of his whereabouts. State media started describing Ai as a "deviant and a plagiarist" in early 2011.

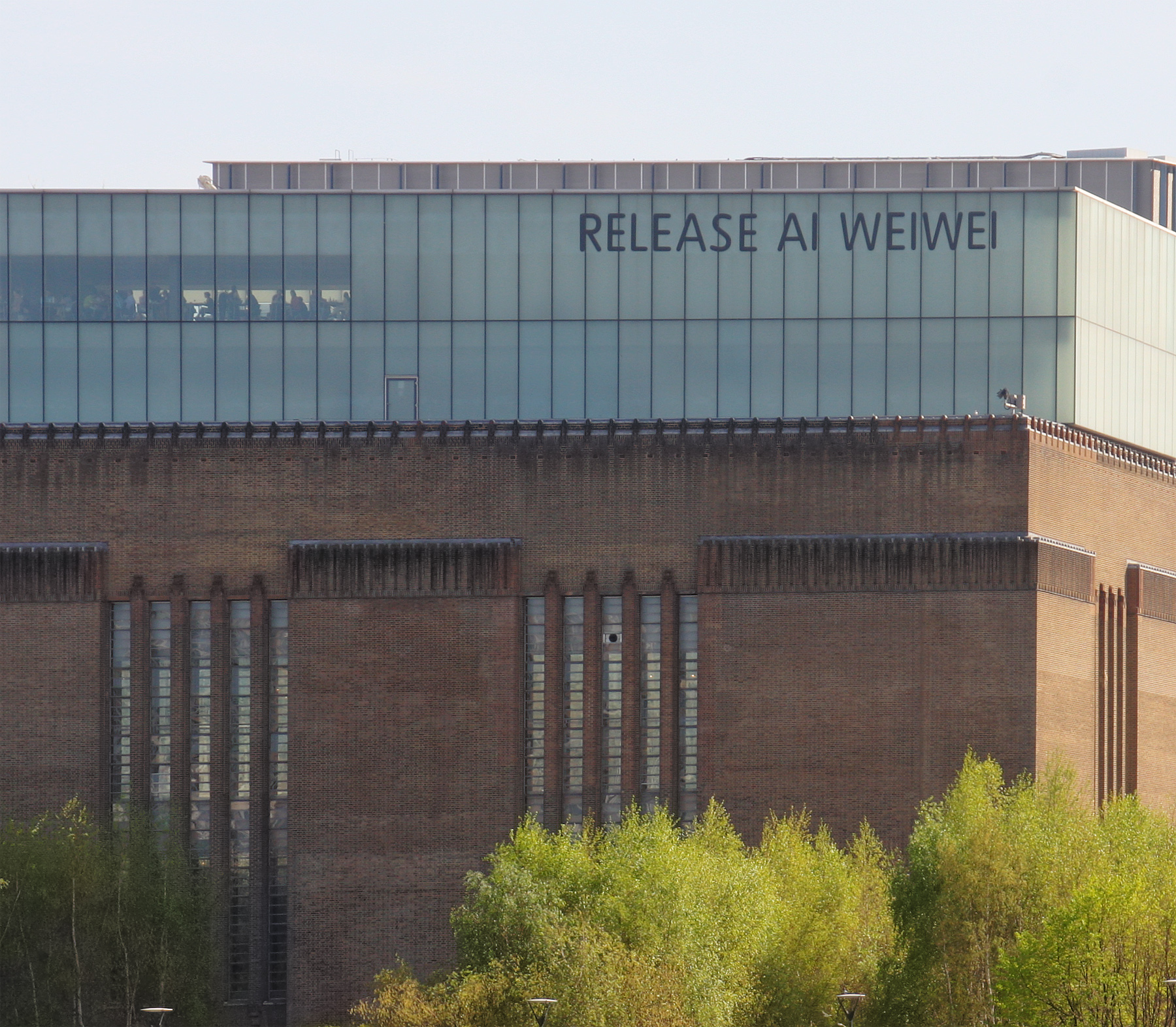
Tate Modern in London, home to Ai's Sunflower Seeds exhibition, put a large sign on their exterior that read "Release Ai Weiwei".

Michael Sheridan of The Australian suggested that Ai had offered himself to the authorities on a platter with some of his provocative art, particularly photographs of himself nude with only a toy alpaca hiding his genitals – with a caption『草泥马挡中央』 ("grass mud horse covering the middle"). The term possesses a double meaning in Chinese: one possible interpretation was given by Sheridan as: "Fuck your mother, the party central committee".

Ming Pao in Hong Kong reacted strongly to the state media's character attack on Ai, saying that authorities had employed "a chain of actions outside the law, doing further damage to an already weak system of laws, and to the overall image of the country." The pro-Beijing state-owned newspaper in Hong Kong, Wen Wei Po, announced that Ai was under arrest for tax evasion, bigamy and spreading indecent images on the internet, and vilified him with multiple instances of strong rhetoric. Supporters said, "the article should be seen as a mainland media commentary attacking Ai, rather than as an accurate account of the investigation."

The United States and European Union protested Ai's detention. The international arts community also mobilised petitions calling for the release of Ai: "1001 Chairs for Ai Weiwei" was organized by Creative Time of New York that calls for artists to bring chairs to Chinese embassies and consulates around the world on 17 April 2011, at 1 pm local time "to sit peacefully in support of the artist's immediate release." Artists in Hong Kong, Germany and Taiwan demonstrated and called for Ai to be released.

One of the major protests by U.S. museums took place on 19 and 20 May when the Museum of Contemporary Art San Diego organized a 24-hour silent protest in which volunteer participants, including community members, media, and museum staff, occupied two traditionally styled Chinese chairs for one-hour periods. The 24-hour sit-in referenced Ai's sculpture series Marble Chair, two of which were on view and were subsequently acquired for the museum's permanent collection.

The Solomon R. Guggenheim Foundation and the International Council of Museums, which organised petitions, said they had collected more than 90,000 signatures calling for the release of Ai. On 13 April 2011, a group of European intellectuals led by Václav Havel had issued an open letter to Wen Jiabao, condemning the arrest and demanding the immediate release of Ai. The signatories include Ivan Klíma, Jiří Gruša, Jáchym Topol, Elfriede Jelinek, Adam Michnik, Adam Zagajewski, Helmuth Frauendorfer; Bei Ling, a Chinese poet in exile drafted and also signed the open letter.

On 16 May 2011, the Chinese authorities allowed Ai's wife to visit him briefly. Liu Xiaoyuan, his attorney and personal friend, reported that Wei was in good physical condition and receiving treatment for his chronic diabetes and hypertension; he was not in a prison or hospital but under some form of house arrest.

He is the subject of the 2012 documentary film Ai Weiwei: Never Sorry, directed by American filmmaker Alison Klayman, which received a special jury prize at the 2012 Sundance Film Festival and opened the Hot Docs Canadian International Documentary Festival, North America's largest documentary festival, in Toronto on 26 April 2012.

==== Release ====
On 22 June 2011, the Chinese authorities released Ai from jail after almost three months' detention on charges of tax evasion. Beijing Fa Ke Cultural Development Ltd. (Chinese: 北京发课文化公司), a company Ai controlled, had allegedly evaded taxes and intentionally destroyed accounting documents. State media also reports that Ai was granted bail on account of Ai's "good attitude in confessing his crimes", willingness to pay back taxes, and his chronic illnesses. According to the Chinese Foreign Ministry, he was prohibited from leaving Beijing without permission for one year. Ai's supporters widely viewed his detention as retaliation for his vocal criticism of the government. On 23 June 2011, professor Wang Yujin of China University of Political Science and Law stated that the release of Ai on bail shows that the Chinese government could not find any solid evidence of Ai's alleged "economic crime". On 24 June 2011, Ai told a Radio Free Asia reporter that he was thankful for the support of the Hong Kong public, and praised Hong Kong's conscious society. Ai also mentioned that his detention by the Chinese regime was hellish (Chinese: 九死一生), and stressed that he is forbidden to say too much to reporters.

After his release, his sister gave some details about his detention condition to the press, explaining that he was subjected to a kind of psychological torture: he was detained in a tiny room with constant light, and two guards were set very close to him at all times, and watched him constantly. In November, Chinese authorities were again investigating Ai and his associates, this time under the charge of spreading pornography. Lu was subsequently questioned by police, and released after several hours though the exact charges remain unclear. In January 2012, in its International Review issue Art in America magazine featured an interview with Ai Weiwei at his home in China. J.J. Camille (the pen name of a Chinese-born writer living in New York), "neither a journalist nor an activist but simply an art lover who wanted to talk to him" had travelled to Beijing the previous September to conduct the interview and to write about his visit to "China's most famous dissident artist" for the magazine.

On 21 June 2012, Ai's bail was lifted. Although he was allowed to leave Beijing, the police informed him that he was still prohibited from traveling to other countries because he is "suspected of other crimes", including pornography, bigamy and illicit exchange of foreign currency. Until 2015, he remained under heavy surveillance and restrictions of movement, but continued to criticize through his work. In July 2015, he was given a passport and permitted to travel abroad.

Ai says that at the beginning of his detention he was proud of being detained much like his father had been earlier. He also says it allowed him to try a dialogue with the authorities, something which had never been possible before.

Reflecting on his arrest in a 2021 interview with the fine art news magazine Art & Object, Ai stated, "Going back to China, I had to ask myself what's the worst that can happen? I end up in jail. I thought, yeah, I can take that. It was easy thinking it, but not in reality. While you're being put in jail you realize what jail looks like. In jail there are certain conditions where you wish to die rather than to stay alive. Basically, you use life to punish life. So, everything in jail is against the essential meaning of being alive."

=== Tax case ===
In June 2011, the Beijing Local Taxation Bureau demanded a total of over 12 million yuan (US$1.85 million) from Beijing Fa Ke Cultural Development Ltd. in unpaid taxes and fines, and accorded three days to appeal the demand in writing. According to Ai's wife, Beijing Fa Ke Cultural Development Ltd. has hired two Beijing lawyers as defense attorneys. Ai's family state that Ai is "neither the chief executive nor the legal representative of the design company, which is registered in his wife's name."

Offers of donations poured in from Ai's fans across the world when the fine was announced. Eventually, an online loan campaign was initiated on 4 November 2011, and close to 9 million RMB was collected within ten days, from 30,000 contributions. Notes were folded into paper planes and thrown over the studio walls, and donations were made in symbolic amounts such as 8964 (4 June 1989, Tiananmen Massacre) or 512 (12 May 2008, Sichuan earthquake). To thank creditors and acknowledge the contributions as loans, Ai designed and issued loan receipts to all who participated in the campaign. Funds raised from the campaign were used as collateral, required by law for an appeal on the tax case. Lawyers acting for Ai submitted an appeal against the fine in January 2012; the Chinese government subsequently agreed to conduct a review.

In June 2012, the court heard the tax appeal case. Ai's wife, Lu Qing, the legal representative of the design company, attended the hearing. Lu was accompanied by several lawyers and an accountant, but the witnesses they had requested to testify, including Ai, were prevented from attending a court hearing. Ai asserts that the entire matter—including the 81 days he spent in jail in 2011—is intended to suppress his provocations. Ai said he had no illusions as to how the case would turn out, as he believes the court will protect the government's own interests. On 20 June, hundreds of Ai's supporters gathered outside the Chaoyang District Court in Beijing despite a small army of police officers, some of whom videotaped the crowd and led several people away. On 20 July, Ai's tax appeal was rejected in court. The same day Ai's studio released "The Fake Case" which tracks the status and history of this case including a timeline and the release of official documents. On 27 September, the court upheld the back taxes and fines totaling RMB 15.52 million (US$2.4 million). Ai had previously deposited 1.33 million in a government-controlled account in order to appeal. Ai said he will not pay the remainder because he does not recognize the charge.

In October 2012, authorities revoked the license of Beijing Fa Ke Cultural Development Ltd. for failing to re-register, an annual requirement by the administration. The company was not able to complete this procedure as its materials and stamps were confiscated by the government.

=== "15 Years of Chinese Contemporary Art Award (CCAA)" – Power Station of Art, Shanghai, 2014 ===
On 26 April 2014, Ai's name was removed from a group show taking place at the Shanghai Power Station of Art. The exhibition was held to celebrate the fifteenth anniversary of the art prize created by Uli Sigg in 1998, with the purpose of promoting and developing Chinese contemporary art. Ai won the Lifetime Contribution Award in 2008 and was part of the jury during the first three editions of the prize. He was then invited to take part in the group show together with the other selected Chinese artists. Shortly before the exhibition's opening, some museum workers removed his name from the list of winners and jury members painted on a wall. Also, Ai's works Sunflower Seeds and Stools were removed from the show and kept in a museum office. Sigg declared that it was not his decision and that it was a decision of the Power Station of Art and the Shanghai Municipal Bureau of Culture.

=== "Hans van Dijk: 5000 Names – UCCA" ===
In May 2014, the Ullens Center for Contemporary Art, a non-profit art center situated in the 798 art district of Beijing, held a retrospective exhibition in honor of the late curator and scholar, Hans Van Dijk. Ai, a good friend of Hans and a fellow co-founder of the China Art Archives and Warehouse (CAAW), participated in the exhibition with three artworks. On the day of the opening, Ai realized his name was omitted from both Chinese and English versions of the exhibition's press release. Ai's assistants went to the art center and removed his works. It is Ai's belief that, in omitting his name, the museum altered the historical record of van Dijk's work with him. Ai started his own research about what actually happened, and between 23 and 25 May he interviewed the UCCA's director, Philip Tinari, the guest curator of the exhibition, Marianne Brouwer, and the UCCA chief, Xue Mei. He published the transcripts of the interviews on Instagram. In one of the interviews, the CEO of the UCCA, Xue Mei, admitted that, due to the sensitive time of the exhibition, Ai's name was taken out of the press releases on the day of the opening and it was supposed to be restored afterwards. This was to avoid problems with the Chinese authorities, who threatened to arrest her.

=== Support for Julian Assange ===
Ai has long advocated for the release of WikiLeaks founder Julian Assange. In 2016, he co-signed a letter which claimed that the British and Swedish governments were undermining the United Nations (UN) by ignoring the findings of a UN working group that found Assange was being arbitrarily detained. The letter called on both governments to guarantee Assange's freedom of movement and provide him with compensation. Ai also visited Assange in HM Prison Belmarsh after he was arrested by British authorities. In September 2019, Ai held a silent protest in support of Assange outside Old Bailey where Assange's extradition hearing was being held. Ai called for Assange's release and said "He truly represents the very core value of why we are fighting, the freedom of the press."

In 2021, Ai was invited to submit a piece for the virtual British art exhibition The Great Big Art Exhibition, which was organized by Firstsite. Ai's piece, called Postcard for Political Prisoners, incorporated a photograph of the running machine used by Assange while staying at the Ecuadorian embassy in London. After initially accepting Ai's idea, Firstsite's director said that it could not include his project "due to time constraints, and because it did not fit with the concept of the exhibition." Ai said he thought the reason for the rejection was that the exhibition did not "want to touch on a topic like Assange."

=== Israeli–Palestinian conflict ===
Ai has been a long-time supporter of Palestinian causes. His 2017 documentary film Human Flow, on the global refugee crisis, included filming in the Gaza Strip.

In November 2023, Ai's exhibition at the Lisson Gallery in London was postponed indefinitely after he tweeted about the Israeli–Palestinian conflict that "the sense of guilt around the persecution of the Jewish people has been, at times, transferred to offset the Arab world. Financially, culturally, and in terms of media influence, the Jewish community has had a significant presence in the United States". He criticized the suspension of two New York University professors for comments regarding Israel's actions in the Gaza Strip, saying "This is really like a cultural revolution, which is really trying to destroy anybody who have different attitudes, not even a clear opinion."

In December 2025, Ai signed an open letter calling for the release of jailed Palestinian leader Marwan Barghouti. In January 2026, Ai said that the West lacks the moral authority to criticize China's human rights record, citing censorship of his works over his pro-Palestinian stance and the treatment of Assange as aspects of the West's human rights record that make criticism of China hypocritical.

== Artistic works ==
Critic John McDonald described Ai's installation Mushrooms in front of the Museum of Contemporary Art Australia in Sydney, featuring 500 Chinese-made Nazi-style combat helmets, as "astonishingly banal", and national art critic for The Australian newspaper, Christopher Allen, described Ai in a review of Mushrooms as "the most unabashed practitioner of pseudo-public art in the world today".

== Awards and honors ==
2008

- Chinese Contemporary Art Awards, Lifetime Achievement

2009

- International Architecture Awards, Anthenaeum Museum of Architecture and Design, Chicago, US

2010

- Honorary doctorate degree from the Faculty of Politics and Social Science, Ghent University, Belgium
- Das Glas der Vernunft (The Prism of Reason), Kassel Citizen Award, Kassel, Germany
- Wallpaper Design Award for the Tsai Residence, which won Best New Private House
- Asteroid 83598 Aiweiwei, discovered by Bill Yeung in 2001, was named in his honor

2011

- Appointed visiting professor of the Berlin University of the Arts
- The Bianca Jagger Human Rights Foundation Award for Courage
- Honorary academician at the Royal Academy of Arts, London, UK
- Skowhegan Medal for Multidisciplinary Art, New York City, US

2012

- The inaugural Václav Havel Prize for Creative Dissent of the Human Rights Foundation
- Honorary degree from Pratt Institute
- Honorary fellowship from Royal Institute of British Architects
- Elected as foreign member of Royal Swedish Academy of Arts
- International Center of Photography Cornell Capa Award

2013

- Appraisers Association Award for Excellence in the Arts
- Amnesty Media Award
- St. Moritz Art Masters Lifetime Achievement Award
- Ping'an Yueqing (2012) has won the Spirit of Independence award at the Beijing Independent Film Festival
- Honorary doctorate in fine arts at the Maryland Institute College of Art in Baltimore, US

2015

- Amnesty International's Ambassador of Conscience Award, in Berli

2018

- Marina Kellen French Outstanding Contributions to the Arts Award granted by the Americans for the Arts.
- International Artist Award, Anderson Ranch Arts Center

2023

- Honorary Fellow of Downing College, Cambridge

== See also ==
- WeiweiCam
