= Rite (Christianity) =

Sacred ceremony or liturgical tradition in Christianity

In Christianity, a rite can refer to a sacred ceremony, which may carry the status of a sacrament or sacramental depending on the Christian denomination. This use of rite is distinct from reference to liturgical ritual families such as the Byzantine and Latin liturgical rites.

== Catholicism ==
Within the Catholic Church, rite often refers to what is also called a sacrament and respective liturgies based on liturgical languages and traditional local customs as well as the ceremonies associated with the sacraments. In Christian Catholicism, for example, the sacrament of Anointing of the Sick (part of the Last Rites) is one of the sacramental rites. The other Last rites are Penance and the administration of the Eucharist (administered as Viaticum). Since the Second Vatican Council, anointing of the sick is administered, too, to those who are seriously ill but not necessarily in immediate danger of death.

Another example is the Rite of Christian Initiation of Adults. The term rite became widely used after the Second Vatican Council. While rite is often associated when receiving a sacrament, it is technically incorrect to say that one received a rite because the sacrament is what is received while a rite is performed. The rite consists of the prayers and actions that the minister of the sacrament performs when administering a sacrament."

== Protestantism ==
A Lutheran pastor performs the rite of confirmation on confirmands after instructing them in Luther's Small Catechism.

Within many Protestant Christian denominations, the word rite is often used specifically for important ceremonies that are not considered sacraments or ordinances. The 39 Articles of the Anglican Communion and the Articles of Religion of the Methodist Church state "there are two Sacraments ordained of Christ our Lord in the Gospel, that is to say, Baptism and the Supper of the Lord". As such, in the Anglican and Methodist traditions, the following are considered rites: "confirmation, reconciliation (confessions of sins), matrimony, holy orders and anointing of the sick". A number of Methodist denominations, such as the Missionary Methodist Church and the New Congregational Methodist Church practice the rite of footwashing during the celebration of the Lord's Supper. Similarly the "rites of the Moravian Church are Confirmation, Marriage, and Ordination". In the Lutheran tradition, Holy Baptism, Holy Eucharist, and Confession & Absolution are considered Lutheran sacraments, while Confirmation, Anointing of the Sick, Holy Matrimony, and Holy Orders are rites. As far as the liturgy is concerned, Western Lutheran churches use rites based on the Formula Missae while the Eastern Lutheran churches use the Byzantine Rite.

== See also ==
- Liturgy
- Funerary rites
- Marriage rites
- List of Christian liturgical rites
