= Eucharistic discipline =

Regulations and practices associated with the Eucharist

The faithful receive the Eucharist kneeling on the chancel rail during the offering of the Mass at Vadstena Abbey Church (Evangelical-Lutheran) in Sweden

Eucharistic discipline is the term applied to the regulations and practices associated with an individual preparing for the reception of the Eucharist. Different Christian traditions require varying degrees of preparation, which may include a period of fasting, prayer, repentance, and confession.

== Practice by Christian denomination ==
=== Anglican practice ===
From the 1979 Book of Common Prayer of the Episcopal Church in the United States:

The Holy Eucharist is the sacrament commanded by Christ for the continual remembrance of his life, death, and resurrection, until his coming again. The Eucharist, the Church's sacrifice of praise and thanksgiving, is the way by which the sacrifice of Christ is made present, and in which he unites us to his one offering of himself. The Holy Eucharist is called the Lord's Supper, and Holy Communion; it is also known as the Divine Liturgy, the Mass, and the Great Offering.

The outward and visible sign in the Eucharist is bread and wine, given and received according to Christ's command. The inward and spiritual grace in the Holy Communion is the Body and Blood of Christ given to his people, and received by faith. The benefits we receive are the forgiveness of our sins, the strengthening of our union with Christ and one another, and the foretaste of the heavenly banquet which is our nourishment in eternal life.

Prior to receiving the Eucharist, it is required that we should examine our lives, repent of our sins, and be in love and charity with all people.

Saint Augustine's Prayer Book, which is used by many Anglicans of a High Churchmanship, requires a Eucharistic Fast to be held by Christians prior to receiving Holy Communion; it defines this as a "strict fast from both food and drink from midnight" that is done "in order to receive the Blessed Sacrament as the first food of the day" in "homage to our Lord". It asks Anglicans to fast for some hours before the Midnight Mass of Christmas Eve, the first liturgy of Christmastide.

=== Catholic practice ===
Sufficient spiritual preparation must be made by each Catholic prior to receiving Holy Communion and one must believe truly in the Real Presence of Christ in the Eucharist. A Catholic in a state of mortal sin should first make a sacramental confession: otherwise that person commits a sacrilege. A sacrilege is the unworthy treatment of sacred things. Deliberate and irreverent treatment of the Eucharist is the worst of all sacrileges, as this quote from the Council of Trent shows:

As of all the sacred mysteries ... none can compare with the ... Eucharist, so likewise for no crime is there heavier punishment to be feared from God than for the unholy or irreligious use by the faithful of that which ... contains the very Author and Source of holiness. (De Euch., v.i).

The above applies to both Latin Church and Eastern Catholics; the Eastern Catholic canon law (which applies to the Eastern Catholic Churches) having exactly the same rule regarding the obligation to receiving the sacrament of Penance or Reconciliation before taking Communion.

==== Latin Church ====
In addition, one abstains from food and drink (except water and medicine) for at least one hour before receiving. The discipline for Eastern Catholics generally requires a longer period of fasting and some Latin Catholics observe the earlier (pre-1955) discipline of fasting from the previous midnight.

The 1917 Code of Canon Law mandated a Eucharistic Fast from midnight until the reception of Holy Communion; this fast requires abstention from both food and liquids, inclusive of water. As such, "Those who have not kept the natural fast from midnight are not allowed to receive, except in danger of death, or in case it should become necessary to consume the Blessed Sacrament to safeguard it against irreverence." On 6 January 1953, Pope Pius XII provided a dispensation in which the sick could take liquids during this time, though alcohol was strictly forbidden; the dispensation also allowed priests to consume liquids if they were offering the sacrifice of the Holy Mass after 9 am, engaged in "onerous work of the sacred ministry (for example, from early in the morning or for a long time)," or after a long journey.

The present-day canonical discipline of the Latin Church is found in Book IV, Part I, Title III, Chapter I, Article 2 (Participation in the Holy Eucharist) of the 1983 Code of Canon Law. The particular applications of Canon 915 have been quite controversial in recent years, while canons 916 and 919 have not stirred as much controversy:

Can. 916: A person who is conscious of grave sin is not to celebrate Mass or receive the body of the Lord without previous sacramental confession unless there is a grave reason and there is no opportunity to confess; in this case the person is to remember the obligation to make an act of perfect contrition which includes the resolution of confessing as soon as possible.

Can. 919: §1. A person who is to receive the Most Holy Eucharist is to abstain for at least one hour before holy communion from any food and drink, except for only water and medicine.

§2. A priest who celebrates the Most Holy Eucharist two or three times on the same day can take something before the second or third celebration even if there is less than one hour between them.

§3. The elderly, the infirm, and those who care for them can receive the Most Holy Eucharist even if they have eaten something within the preceding hour.

==== Eastern Catholic Churches ====
The rules regarding fasting, prayer and other works of piety are set by each church sui iuris and the faithful should follow those rules wherever taking Communion. At least one such church in the United States follows the Latin discipline of fasting for one hour before Communion.

=== Eastern Orthodox practice ===
Eastern Orthodox Christians are required to fast from all food and drink and abstain from marital relations in preparation for receiving the Eucharist. The fast commences, depending on local custom, no later than when the retiring to sleep the preceding evening and no later than midnight, or even from vespers or sunset the night before. The abstinence from marital relations extends through the preceding day (for which reason married priests may not celebrate the divine liturgy daily), and in some places (notably in Russia), a married priest sleeps in a separate bed from his wife the night before celebrating the liturgy. Fasting in monastic practice is often more strict. During this fasting period, many faithful keep a period of quiet reflection by, for example, abstaining from or limiting television and other entertainment, and by reading devotional literature. Fasting is relaxed for pregnant and nursing women, the ill, the elderly, and young children. It is a matter of some controversy whether or not a menstruating woman may receive the Eucharist, with very traditional churches not allowing her to even enter the nave of the church or receive any of the sacraments except on her deathbed, while other churches may totally disregard this custom. Likewise, a man who is bleeding, for instance from a recently extracted tooth, also may not commune.

One who communes infrequently must go to confession beforehand, while one who communes on a regular basis does confess, but the frequency varies by local custom. However, for those who are mentally or physically incapable of communicating their sins to a priest, absolution is given without confessing, and for babies and young children even absolution is dispensed with.

==== Additional Russian practices ====
In some parts of the Russian Orthodox Church, there is a custom before receiving Holy Communion that, in addition to reading the evening and morning prayers and attending vespers the night before, reading three devotional canons and an akathist. The canons are usually to Christ, the Theotokos and the guardian angel. There is a custom, among those who have the liturgical resources, to chant the following canons according to the day of the week:

- On a Monday: Canon to the Lord, the Theotokos, the Archangels, and if he so desire, the Guardian Angel
- On a Tuesday: Canon to Lord, the Theotokos, the Forerunner, and the Guardian Angel
- On a Wednesday: Canon to the Cross, the Theotokos, and the Guardian Angel
- On a Thursday: Canon to the Lord, the Theotokos, the Guardian Angel, the Apostles and, if he so desire, Saint Nicholas
- On a Friday: Canon to the Cross, the Theotokos, and the Guardian Angel
- On a Saturday: Canon to the Lord, the Theotokos, the Guardian Angel, and All Saints
- On a Sunday: Canon to the Lord, the Theotokos, and the Guardian Angel

For Pascha (Easter) and Bright Week, this requirement is usually relaxed.

==== Prayers before and after communion ====
In all Orthodox churches, special prayers before and after communion are recited by the faithful before and after the Eucharist. In current practice, at least a portion of the pre-communion prayers are often recited during the divine liturgy. These prayers express humility and the communicants' sense of unworthiness for the gift they are about to receive. The post-Communion prayers are often read aloud by a reader or a member of the congregation after the liturgy and during the veneration of the cross, these prayers of thanksgiving expressing the communicants' joy at having received the holy mysteries "for the healing of soul and body".

=== Irvingian practice ===
The New Apostolic Church, the largest of the Irvingian Churches, teaches:

The fundamental prerequisites for partaking worthily of Holy Communion are belief and a repentant heart filled with longing for salvation. Although unbelief does not render the sacrament invalid, faith is the prerequisite for it to serve for blessing and salvation. Unbelief in receiving the sacrament can be related to the words in 1 Corinthians 11: 29: "For he who eats and drinks in an unworthy manner eats and drinks judgement to himself, not discerning the Lord's body." Those who are indifferent to the suffering and death of Christ or who merely make a habit of the celebration of the sacrament, and partake of Holy Communion in this manner, run the risk of doing so unworthily.

=== Evangelical-Lutheran practice ===
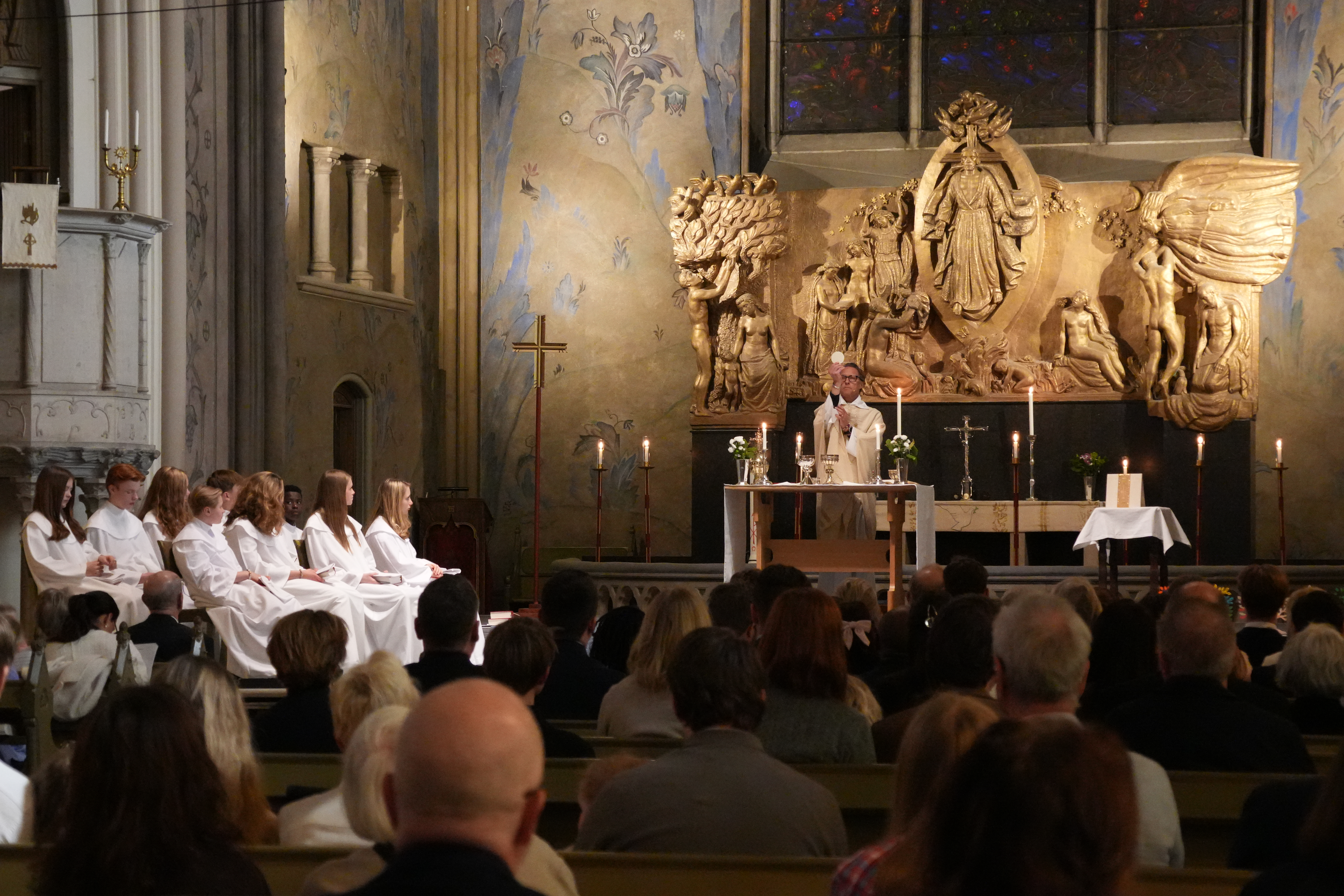
An Evangelical-Lutheran priest of the Church of Sweden elevates the host before the congregation during a Confirmation Mass at Oscar's Church on the Third Sunday of Eastertide.

In the Evangelical-Lutheran tradition, the Body and Blood of Jesus Christ is believed to be really present in the sacrament of the Eucharist (see Sacramental union).

Lutherans are taught to prepare to receive this sacrament through prayerful reflection upon their sinful nature, their need for a Savior, the promise that their sins are forgiven for the sake of Jesus' death on the Cross, and that the Eucharist gives this forgiveness to them. "Fasting and bodily preparation are indeed a fine outward training," Martin Luther said, "but he is truly worthy and well prepared who has faith in these words, 'given and shed for you for the forgiveness of sins.'"

As such, many Lutherans receive the sacrament of penance before partaking of the Eucharist.

The Evangelical Lutheran Church in America, the largest Lutheran denomination in the United States, practices open communion, offering the Eucharist to adults without receiving catechetical instruction, provided they are baptized and believe in the Real Presence.

Some Lutherans practice closed communion, and require catechetical instruction for all people before receiving the Eucharist. Failing to do so is condemned by these Lutherans as the sin of "unionism". These Lutheran denominations restrict communicants to members of their own Synod and those churches and Synods with whom they share "altar and pulpit fellowship", which may mean excluding even other Lutherans from Eucharistic reception.

The timing of First Communion also varies. Historically, First Communion was delayed until after an individual had completed catechism classes and been confirmed, but gradually the timing of First Communion shifted so that it was administered before Confirmation rather than after, following the Roman Catholic tradition. In many Lutheran churches, the average age of first communion is somewhere between the ages of seven and ten, though a considerable number of Lutheran churches offer First Communion even earlier. In North America, the time for administering First Communion is usually determined by the parents in consultation with the local pastor, but some Synods may have guidelines which prevent communion before a specific minimum age.

=== Methodist practice ===
The Doctrines and Discipline of the Methodist Church specifies that "Upon entering the church let the communicants bow in prayer and in the spirit of prayer and meditation approach the Blessed Sacrament." Traditionally, before the Lord's Supper is celebrated on a Sunday, Methodist pastors meet with class leaders and their class meetings on the preceding Friday (the traditional day of fasting in Methodism) to "inquire how their souls are prospering; to exhort, reprove, advise, etc., as duty may require, preparatory to their receiving the Lord's Supper."

In many Methodist connexions, such as the United Methodist Church, the table is made available to all people, and none are turned away. This practice is referred to as keeping an "Open table". The general invitation is typically made in the ritual, "Christ our Lord invites to his table all who love him, who earnestly repent of their sin and seek to live in peace with one another." All are free to communicate at the appropriate time, though unbaptized persons who respond to the invitation are urged to be instructed in and receive baptism as soon as possible, as Methodism recognises that in normal circumstances, baptism should be a prerequisite to a person's partaking in the Eucharist. Other Methodist connexions, such as the African Methodist Episcopal Zion Church, teach that "No person shall be admitted to the Lord's Supper among us who is guilty of any practice from which we would exclude a Member of our Church." The Wesleyan Holiness Association of Churches holds that "Being the Communion Feast, only those who have faith in Christ and love for the saints should be called to participate (Matt. 26:26-29; Luke 22:19-20; 1 Cor. 11:23-29)."

=== Oriental Orthodox practice ===
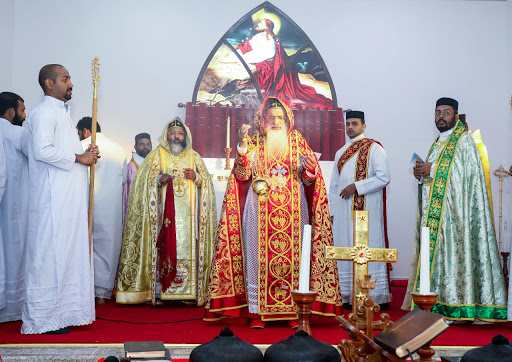
The celebration of the Holy Qurobo in a congregation of the Indian Orthodox Church.

In Oriental Orthodox Christianity, the "holiness of the Church is traditionally tied scripturally with the Jerusalem Temple." As such, believers fast after midnight and "sexual intercourse is prohibited the night before communion."

Pope Dionysius of Alexandria taught that with regard to menstruating women that "not even they themselves, being faithful and pious, would dare when in this state either to approach the Holy Table or to touch the Body and Blood of Christ." As such, Oriental Orthodox Christian women, such as those belonging to the Coptic Orthodox Church, are not permitted to receive Holy Communion while they are menstruating.

In the Ethiopian Orthodox Church, people who are ritually unclean may approach the church but are not permitted to enter it; they instead stand near the church door and pray during the liturgy.

=== Presbyterian practice ===
Among Presbyterians, there is neither requirement, nor prohibition, of any of the traditional understandings of what it means to "make ready": it is left to local custom. In modern times, there is no uniform practice of earlier patterns of fasting, public or private prayer, or the preparatory service (Vespers).

However, the Westminster Larger Catechism has rather extensive instructions on how those who "receive the sacrament of the Lord's supper are, before they come, to prepare themselves unto..." Specifically, they are to prepare "by examining themselves of their being in Christ, of their sins and wants; of the truth and measure of their knowledge, faith, repentance; love to God and the brethren, charity to all men, forgiving those that have done them wrong; of their desires after Christ, and of their new obedience; and by renewing the exercise of these graces, by serious meditation, and fervent prayer."

Therefore, the Presbyterian Church in America's Directory for the Worship of God advises that a week's notice be given to the congregation prior to the administration of the Lord's supper: "It is proper that public notice should be given to the congregation, at least the Sabbath before the administration of this ordinance, and that, either then, or on some day of the week, the people be instructed in its nature, and a due preparation for it, that all may come in a suitable manner to this holy feast."

The Westminster Larger Catechism also provides extensive instructions on "what is required of them that receive the sacrament of the Lord's supper" during and after its administration.

=== Sedevacantist practice ===
Sedevacantists are people who identify as Catholic and hold that the present occupier of the Holy See is not the pope due to the mainstream church's espousal of what they see as heresies of modernism and that, for lack of a valid pope, the See has been vacant since the death of Pope Pius XII in 1958, the death of Pope John XXIII in 1963, the death of Pope Paul VI in 1978, or since the first alleged publicly proclaimed heresy by Paul VI, or what they view as some other failure of the true Church to appoint a valid pontiff. Sedevacantists often hold concerns regarding perceived departures from dogmatic pronouncements and changes to ecclesiastical discipline since the Second Vatican Council, leading to a difference between their fasting and abstinence practices and that of the Catholic Church.

The Congregation of Mary Immaculate Queen (CMRI), a sedevacantist religious group, teaches that the Eucharistic Fast consists of means fasting from food and alcohol three hours prior to receiving Holy Communion, and though not obligatory, members of the sect are "urged to observe the Eucharistic fast" from midnight on a day until the time that they receive communion.

=== Jansenist practice ===
Jansenists were a theological group part of the Roman Catholic church starting in the 1600s. They believed that Holy Communion should be received very infrequently, and that reception required much more than freedom from mortal sin instead arguing that a high degree of perfection, including purification from attachment to venial sin, was necessary before approaching the sacrament of the Eucharist.

== See also ==
- Thanksgiving after Communion
- Open communion
- Closed communion
- Spiritual Communion
