= Catholic guilt =

Excess guilt felt by Catholics and lapsed Catholics

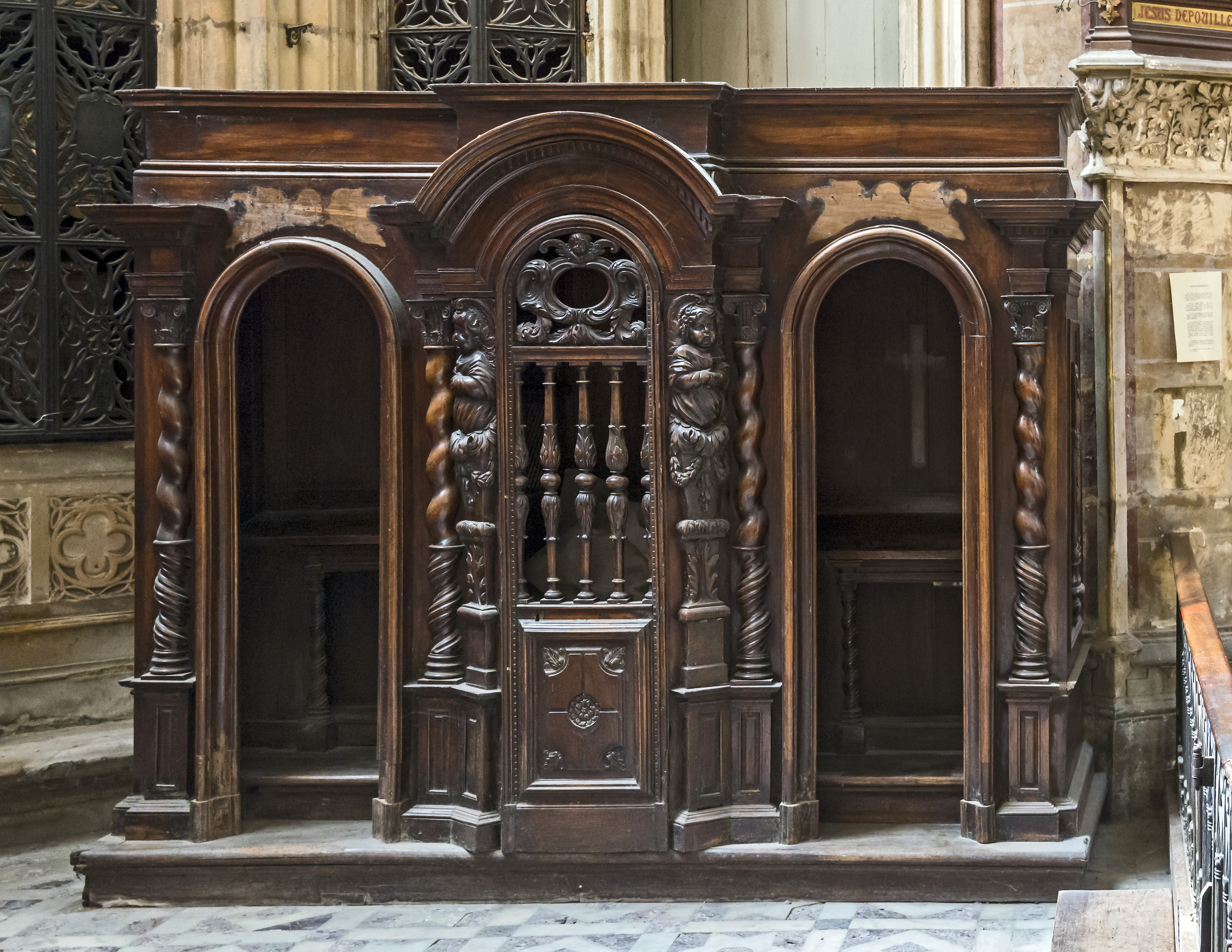
A confessional, used by Catholics to confess their sins

Catholic guilt is the reported excess guilt felt by Catholics and lapsed Catholics. Guilt is remorse for having committed some offense or wrong, real or imagined. It is related to, although distinguishable from, "shame", in that the former involves an awareness of causing injury to another, while the latter arises from the consciousness of something dishonorable, improper, or ridiculous, done by oneself. One might feel guilty for having hurt someone, and also ashamed of oneself for having done so. Philip Yancey, a spiritual author who often writes about the Christian faith, has said of guilt that it "is only a symptom; we listen to it because it drives us toward the cure".

The Penitential Act at the beginning of Mass is a liturgical rudiment of this previously sacramental Confession. Private confession to an ordained priest became the normal form of this sacrament, with a strict seal of secrecy on the part of the priest. Sometimes, the practice of the sacrament emphasized doing acts of penance, or making one's sorrow or contrition authentic. Sometimes, it emphasized confessing all of one's serious or "mortal" sins, sometimes it emphasized the power of the priest, acting In persona Christi, to absolve the penitent of sins. Currently, there are forms that include one-on-one Confession to a priest, or communal preparation preceding a one-on-one Confession. After the practice of confession declined in the 1970s, it became common for Catholic theologians and clergy to attribute this to a loss of "healthy guilt".

== Examples ==
Evelyn Waugh's Brideshead Revisited involves guilt in the Catholic religion. Distressed by her romantic relationship with Charles Ryder, Julia Flyte exclaims: "I saw to-day there was one thing unforgivable [...] to set up a rival good to God's. [...] it may be a private bargain between me and God, that if I give up this one thing I want so much, however bad I am, He won't quite despair of me in the end."

The subject is treated humorously in the 30 Rock episode "The Fighting Irish". Catholic guilt is described by Jack Donaghy (Alec Baldwin): "That's not how it works, Tracy. Even though there is the whole confession thing, that's no free pass, because there is a crushing guilt that comes with being a Catholic. Whether things are good or bad or you're simply... eating tacos in the park, there is always the crushing guilt".

== Research ==
Guilt can be viewed in terms of constructiveness versus destructiveness: "constructive guilt" is focused on forgiving one's ethical lapses and changing one's behavior, while "destructive guilt" remains mired in self-loathing and does not emphasize learning from one's wrongdoings and moving ahead with life. A 2005 study in Psychology of Religion found that Catholic participants demonstrated a higher level of constructive guilt reactions than other groups. Research on a link between Catholicism and guilt appears to be inconclusive.

Guilt is an important factor in perpetuating obsessive–compulsive disorder symptoms. Research is mixed on the possible connection between Catholicism and obsessive-compulsive symptoms. A 2002 study of 165 individuals by the University of Parma found that religious individuals scored higher on measures of control of thoughts and overimportance of thoughts, and that these measures were associated with obsessive-compulsive symptoms only in the religious participants.

A 1998 study noted a link between intrinsic religiosity and obsessive-compulsive cognitions/behaviors only among Catholic participants. However, a 1991 study from Boston University found that no particular religion was more common among OCD patients, and that OCD patients were no more religious than other subjects with anxiety. Religious obsessions were connected to the participants' religiosity, but sexual and aggressive symptoms were not. Greater religious devotion among OCD patients was correlated with increased guilt.

A 1984 study in American Behavioral Scientist analyzed interviews with participants from Catholic, Jewish, and Protestant backgrounds. The author reported that most participants "eagerly described an experience of guilt."

In 2004, Ulster University students participated in a study that found a slightly higher level of collective guilt among the Catholic students than the Protestant students.

In 2008, researchers from the University of California, Berkeley and from the University of Notre Dame examined the concept of Catholic guilt among American teenagers. The authors found no evidence of Catholic guilt in this population, noting that Catholicism both caused and relieved less guilt than other religious traditions. The authors found no evidence that Catholic teenagers experience more guilt than non-Catholic ones. The authors did not find that more observant Catholics feel guiltier than less observant Catholics. The study noted no difference in the effect of guilt-inducing behaviors on Catholic versus non-Catholic participants.

A 1988 study from Hofstra University reported no difference in total guilt among religions, although religiosity itself was connected to guilt.

== Catholic viewpoint ==
According to the website Catholic Spiritual Direction, guilt is a by-product of an informed conscience but "Catholic" guilt is often confused with scrupulosity, and an overly scrupulous conscience is an exaggeration of healthy guilt.

Phillip Campbell, an author with Catholic Exchange, wrote an article in February 2024 in which he insists that Catholic guilt is not real. He calls it "a trope wherein Catholics are said to be guilt-obsessed to the point of neurosis, wringing our hands about incidental personal flaws, exaggerating personal culpability, and loving suffering to the point of masochism" and that it plays upon stereotypes of Catholics by getting a fact correct but missing the point.

== See also ==
- Guilt society
- Guilt trip
- On the Genealogy of Morality
- Scrupulosity
- Sin
- Victim soul
