= Lutheran sacraments =

Sacraments within Lutheranism

The Lutheran sacraments are "sacred acts of divine institution". They are also defined as “an outward and visible sign of an inward and spiritual grace”.

Lutherans believe that, whenever they are properly administered by the use of the physical component commanded by God along with the divine words of institution, God is, in a way specific to each sacrament, present with the Word and physical component. They teach that God earnestly offers to all who receive the sacrament forgiveness of sins and eternal salvation. They teach that God also works in the recipients to get them to accept these blessings and to increase the assurance of their possession.

== History ==
Martin Luther taught that there were three sacraments, including baptism, confession, and the eucharist. His writings often reference two or three sacraments. Luther was flexible regarding the number of sacraments, and the Lutheran divine Philip Melanchthon named four sacraments: baptism, confession, eucharist, and ordination. This was during the time when the Roman Catholic Church held to seven sacraments, and while Lutheranism did not term the other three to four as sacraments, they held them to be rites of the Church. Following the tradition of Luther, Lutheranism has not been dogmatic regarding the number of sacraments, with the Apology of the Augsburg Confession teaching that "No intelligent person will quibble about the number of sacraments or the terminology, so long as those things are kept which have God's command and promises."

In the present day, certain Lutheran churches teach that there are three sacraments: Holy Baptism, Holy Eucharist, and Holy Absolution (Confession). Other Lutheran churches teach two sacraments, Holy Baptism and Holy Eucharist, while holding that Holy Absolution is an extension of the sacrament of Holy Baptism. Furthermore, certain Lutheran churches enumerate seven sacraments: Holy Baptism, Holy Eucharist, Holy Confession and Absolution, Holy Orders, Holy Matrimony, Holy Confirmation, and Holy Unction. Regardless of the enumeration, all of these are celebrated in Lutheran churches.

== Characteristics of a sacrament ==
In the Apology of the Augsburg Confession, sacraments are defined as:

If we define the sacraments as rites, which have the command of God and to which the promise of grace has been added, it is easy to determine what the sacraments are, properly speaking. For humanly instituted rites are not sacraments, properly seen because human beings do not have the authority to promise grace. Therefore signs instituted without the command of God are not sure signs of grace, even though they perhaps serve to teach or admonish the common folk.

== Sacraments ==
=== Holy Baptism ===
The Sacrament of Holy Baptism is the sacrament by which one is initiated into the Christian faith. In practice, a person being baptized may be wholly or partly immersed in water, water may be poured over their head, or a few drops may be sprinkled on their head. Lutherans teach that at baptism, people receive regeneration, the forgiveness of sins, and God's promise of salvation. At the same time, they receive the faith they need to be open to God's grace. Lutherans baptize by sprinkling or pouring water on the head of the person (or infant) as the Trinitarian formula is spoken. Lutherans teach baptism to be necessary, but not absolutely necessary, for salvation. That means that although baptism is indeed necessary for salvation, it is, as Luther said, contempt for the sacraments that condemns, not lack of the sacraments. Therefore, one is not denied salvation merely because one may have never had the opportunity to be baptized. This is what is meant by saying that baptism is necessary - but not absolutely necessary - to salvation. Martin Luther discussed baptism in detail in his 1520 work called On the Babylonian Captivity of the Church.

=== Holy Eucharist ===
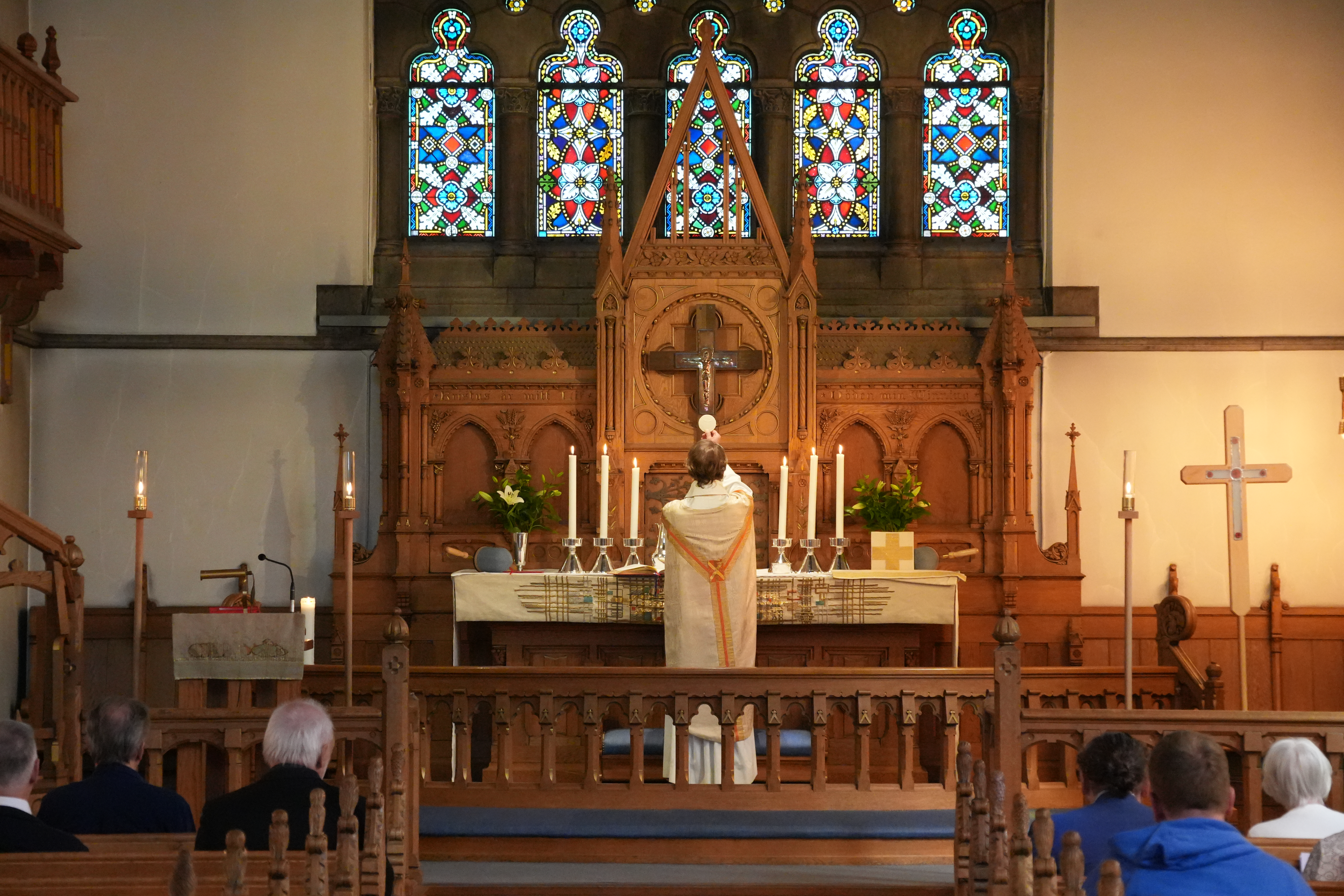
The elevation of the host during the Holy Mass at Gustaf Adolf Church in Stockholm

The Sacrament of the Eucharist is also called the Sacrament of the Altar, the Mass, the Lord's Supper, the Lord's Table, (Holy) Communion, the Breaking of the Bread, and the Blessed Sacrament. In practice, communicants eat bread and drink wine as the true Body and Blood of Christ Himself, "in, with and under the forms" of the consecrated bread and wine. This Eucharistic theology is known as the Sacramental Union.

=== Holy Absolution ===
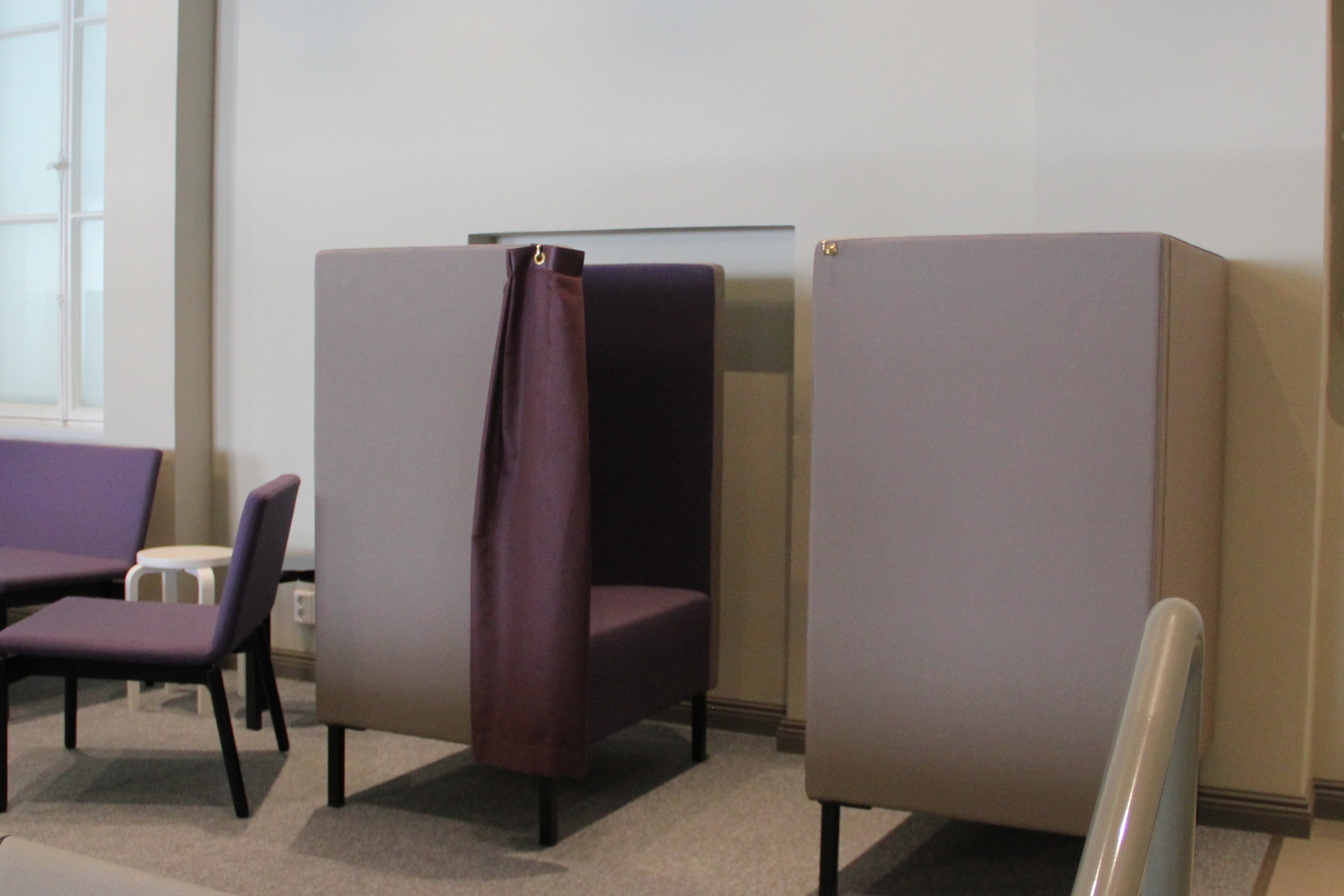
A confessional in Luther Church (Helsinki, Finland)

The third sacrament of the Lutheran churches is Penance (confession), as explicated in the Large Catechism, Book of Concord and Apology of the Augsburg Confession. The Sacrament has two forms:

- The General Confession (known as the Penitential Rite) that is done at the beginning of the Eucharistic service. In this case, the entire congregation says the Confiteor, as the pastor says the Declaration of Grace (or absolution).
- Holy Absolution that is done privately to a pastor, where, following the person (known as the penitent) confessing sins that trouble them, the pastor announces God's forgiveness to the person, as the sign of the cross is made.

In historic Lutheran practice, Holy Absolution is held every Saturday, which is the evening before the offering of the Holy Mass on the Lord's Day; additionally, Holy Absolution is expected before one's First Communion. Shrove Tuesday is a popular day for Holy Absolution as the following day (Ash Wednesday) begins the Christian season of repentance, Lent. But the practice of private confession is voluntary, not obligatory.

The rite for General Confession, as well as (private) Holy Absolution, are contained in the Lutheran hymnals.

The Lutheran churches affirm the seal of the confessional, which mandates that a priest can not disclose the contents of a confession to any third party as he is acting in persona Christi. Many countries have laws that respect this priest–penitent privilege.

In Evangelical-Lutheranism, the sacrament of Holy Absolution is related to Holy Baptism, as there is an "emphasis on the declaration of forgiveness, or absolution".

== Non-sacramental rites ==
=== Confirmation ===
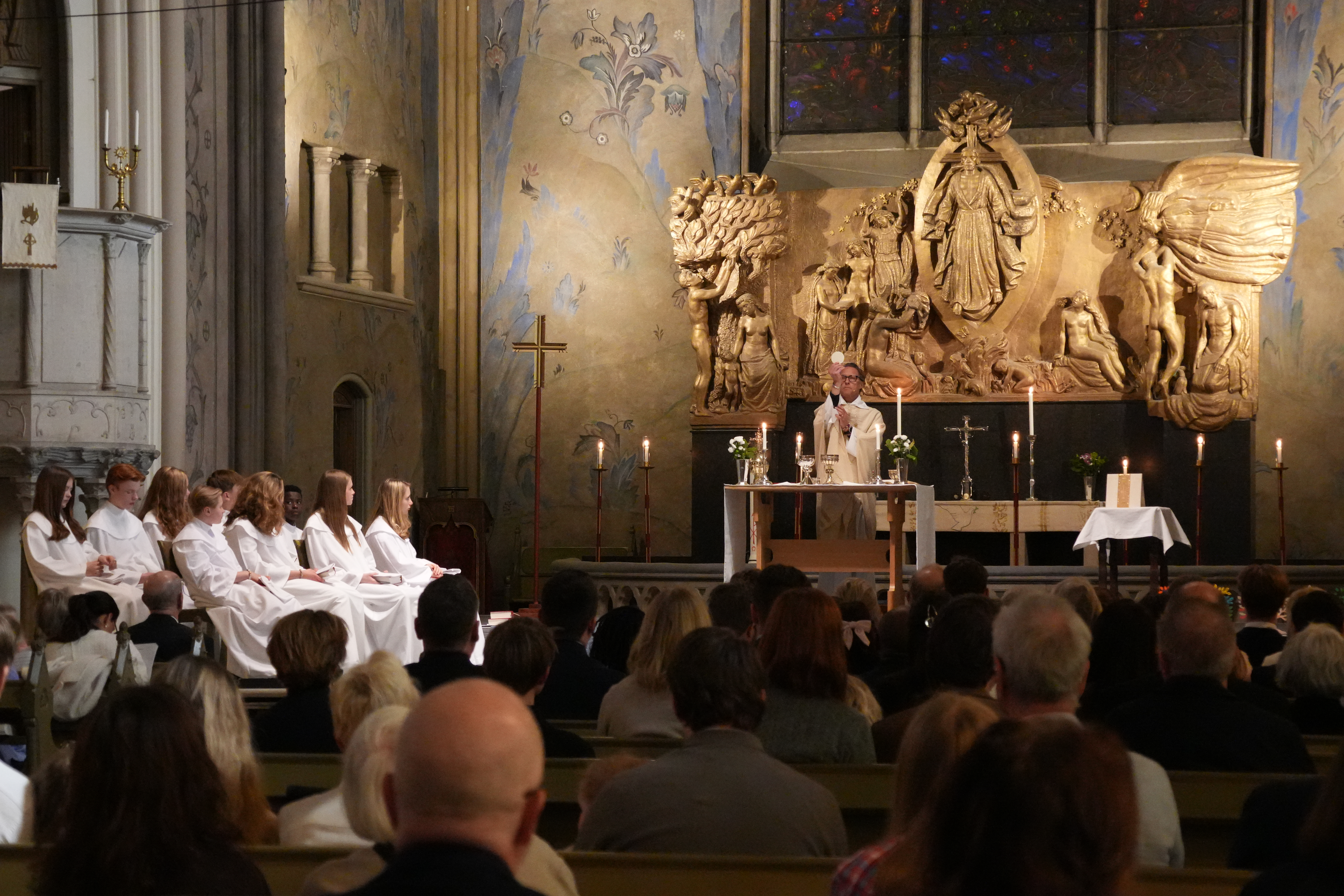
An Evangelical-Lutheran priest of the Church of Sweden elevates the host before the congregation during a Confirmation Mass at Oscar's Church on the Third Sunday of Eastertide.

Confirmation is a public profession of faith prepared for by long and careful instruction. In English, it may also be known as the "affirmation of baptism" and is a mature and public profession of the faith that "marks the completion of the congregation's program of confirmation ministry". The German language uses for Lutheran confirmation a different word (Konfirmation) from the word used for the same Sacrament in the Catholic Church (Firmung). Confirmation teaches baptized Christians the first part of Luther's Small Catechism, which explains the Ten Commandments, the Apostles' Creed, the Lord's Prayer, and the three Lutheran sacraments: the Sacrament of Holy Baptism, the Sacrament of Holy Absolution, and the Sacrament of the Eucharist. An average catechism class lasts about one to two years.

=== Holy Matrimony ===
Holy Matrimony is considered by many to be a union between a man and a woman, acknowledging the grace of God in their life. A number of Lutheran churches will also perform same-sex weddings.

=== Holy Orders ===
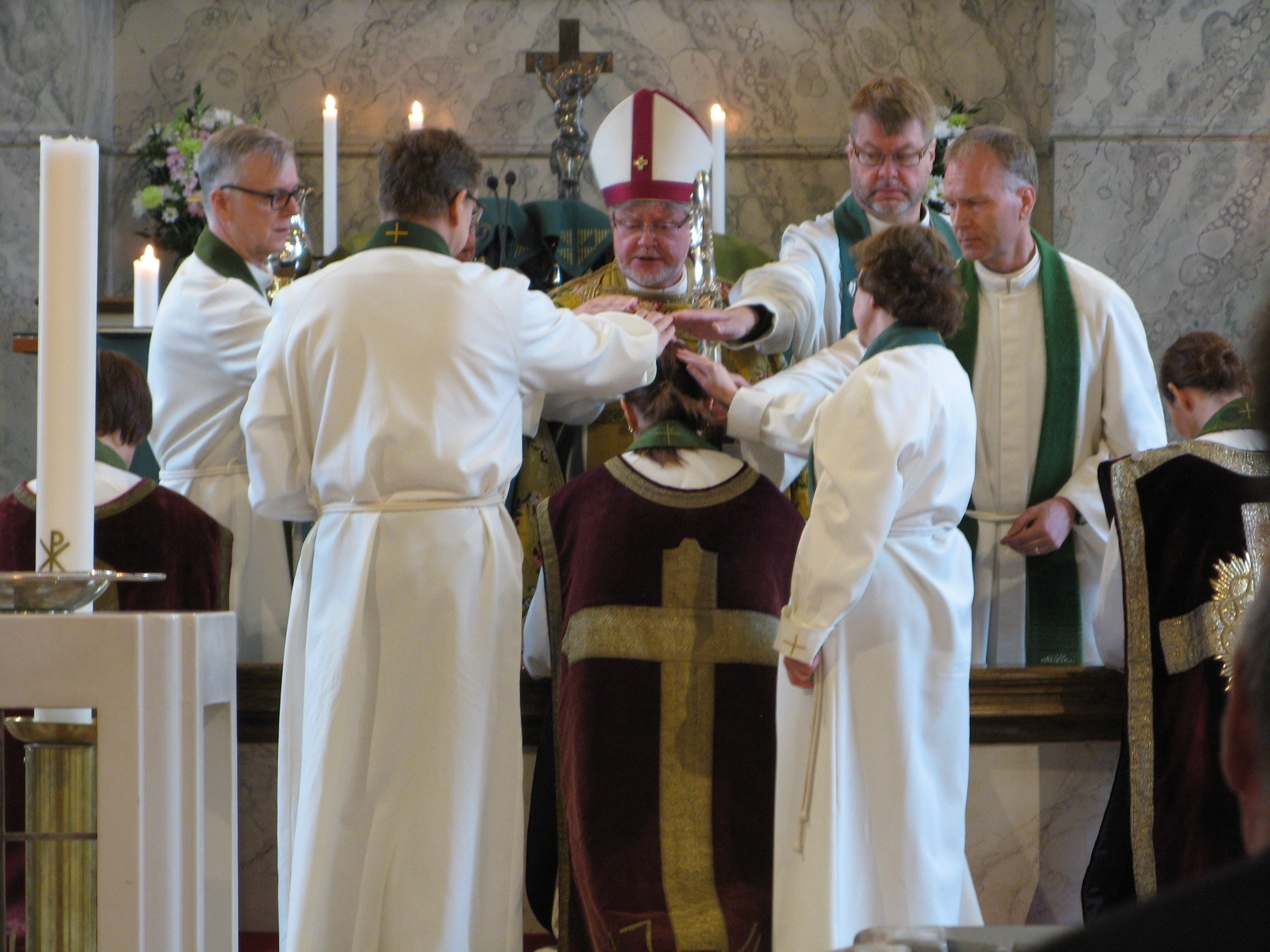
An ordination to the priesthood in the Evangelical Lutheran Church of Finland, 2015

In a number of Evangelical-Lutheran churches, Holy Orders refers to the three orders of bishop, priest and deacon, and the sacrament or rite by which candidates are ordained to those orders, is retained.

The Lutheran Confessions teach that Holy Orders are considered Sacramental (See "Apology to the Augsburg Confession, Article XIII," paragraphs 11-12: "But if ordination be understood as applying to the ministry of the Word, we are not unwilling to call ordination a sacrament. For the ministry of the Word has God's command and glorious promises, Rom. 1:16: The Gospel is the power of God unto salvation to every one that believeth. Likewise, Is. 55:11: So shall My Word be that goeth forth out of My mouth; it shall not return unto Me void, but it shall accomplish that which I please. 12] If ordination be understood in this way, neither will we refuse to call the imposition of hands a sacrament."), though Evangelical-Lutherans, on the whole, reject the Roman Catholic teaching of Holy Orders because they do not think sacerdotalism is supported by the Bible.

Martin Luther taught that each individual was expected to fulfill his God-appointed task in everyday life. The modern usage of the term vocation as a life-task was first employed by Martin Luther. Luther's Small Catechism outlines the duties of those in holy orders, naming bishops, pastors, and preachers, as well as those in the positions of governmental offices, citizens, husbands, wives, children, employees, employers, young people, and widows.

=== Anointing of the Sick ===
The Lutheran Church, like others, use James 5:14–15 as biblical reference for Anointing of the Sick. The process of this rite consists of laying on of hands and/or anointing with oil; while the form consists of prayers.
