= Lay confession =

Confession in the religious sense, made to a lay person

Lay confession is confession in the religious sense, made to a lay person.

== Catholic Church ==
Within the Catholic Church standpoint, lay confession is a primarily historic practice.

It is found under two forms: first, confession without relation to the sacrament, second, confession intended to supply for the sacrament in case of necessity. In the first instance, it consists of confession of venial sins or daily faults which need not necessarily be submitted to the power of the keys; in the second, it has to do with the confession of even grievous sins which should be declared to a priest, but which are confessed to a layman because there is no priest at hand and the case is urgent. In both cases the end sought is the merit of humiliation which is inseparable from freely performed confession; but in the first no administration of the sacrament, in any degree, is sought; in the second, on the contrary, sacramental confession is made to a layman for want of a priest.

Theologians and canonists in dealing with this subject usually have two historical texts as basis. The optional and meritorious confession of slight faults to any Christian is set forth in Venerable Bede's Commentary on the Epistle of St. James: "Confess your sins one to another" (Confitemini alterutrum peccata vestra). "It should be done", says the holy doctor, "with discernment; we should confess our daily and slight faults mutually to our equals, and believe that we are saved by their daily prayer. As for more grievous leprosy (mortal sin), we should, according to the law, discover its impurity to the priest, and according to his judgement carefully purify ourselves in the manner and time he shall fix". Clearly Bede did not consider such mutual avowal a sacramental confession; he had in mind the monastic confession of faults. In the eleventh century Lanfranc sets forth the same theory, but distinguishes between public sins and hidden faults; the first he reserves "to priest, by whom the Church binds and looses:, and authorizes the avowal of the second to all members of the ecclesiastical hierarchy, and in their absence to an upright man (vir mundus), and in the absence of an upright man, to God alone.

So also Raoul l'Ardent, after having declared that the confession of venial sins may be made to any person, even to an inferior" (cuilibet, etiam minori), but he adds this explanation: "We make this confession, not that the layman may absolve us; but because by reason of our own humiliation and accusation of our sins and the prayer of our brethren, we may be purified of our sins:. Confession to laymen made in this way has, therefore, theological objection. The passage from Bede is frequently quoted by the Scholastics.

The other text on which is based the second form of confession to laymen, is taken from a work widely read in the Middle Ages, the De vera et falsa poenitentia, until the sixteenth century unanimously attributed to Augustine of Hippo and quoted as such. To-day it is universally regarded as apocryphal, though it would be difficult to determine its author. After saying that "he who wishes to confess his sins should seek a priest who can bind and loose", he adds these words often repeated as an axiom: "So great is the power of confession that if a priest be wanting, one may confess to his neighbour" (tanta vis est confessionis ut, si deest sacerdos, confiteatur proximo). He goes on to explain clearly the value of this confession made to a layman in case of necessity: "Although the confession be made to one who has no power to loose, nevertheless he who confesses his crime to his companion becomes worthy of pardon through his desire for a priest." Briefly, to obtain pardon, the sinner performs his duty to the best of his ability, i.e. he is contrite and confesses with the desire of addressing himself to a priest; he hopes that the mercy of God will supply what in this point is lacking. The confession is not sacramental, if we may so speak, except on the part of the penitent; a layman cannot be the minister of absolution and he is not regarded as such.

Thus understood confession to laymen is imposed as obligatory later only counselled or simply permitted, by the greater number of theologians from Gratian and Peter Lombard to the sixteenth century and the Reformation. Though Gratian is not so explicit, the Master of the Sentences makes a real obligation of confession to a layman in case of necessity. After having demonstrated that the avowal of sins (confessio oris) is necessary in order to obtain pardon, he declares that this avowal should be made first to God, then to a priest, and in the absence of a priest, to one's neighbour (socio). This doctrine of Peter Lombard is found, with some differences, in many of his commentators, among them, Raymond of Penafort, who authorizes this confession without making it an obligation; Albertus Magnus, who, arguing from baptism conferred by a layman in case of necessity, ascribes a certain sacramental value to absolution by a layman. Thomas Aquinas obliges the penitent to do what he can, and sees something sacramental (quodammodo sacrametalis) in his confession; he adds, following Franciscan Masters Alexander of Hales and Bonaventure, that if the penitent survives he should seek real absolution for a priest (cf. Bonaventure, and Alexander of Hales). Duns Scotus, on the other hand, not only does not make this confession obligatory, but discovers therein certain dangers; after him John of Freiburg, Durandus of Saint-Pourçain, and Astesanus declare this practice merely licit.

Besides the practical manuals for the use of the priests may be mentioned the Manipulus curatorum of Guy de Montrocher (1333), the synodal statutes of William, Bishop of Cahors, about 1325, which oblige sinners to confess to a layman in case of necessity; all, however, agree in saying that there is no real absolution and that recourse should be had to a priest if possible.

Practice corresponds to theory; in the medieval chansons de gestes and in annals and chronicles, examples of such confessions occur. Thus, Jean de Joinville relates, that the army of the Christians having been put to flight by the Saracens, each one confessed to any priest he could find, and at need to his neighbour; he himself thus received the confession of Guy d'Ybelin, and gave him a kind of absolution saying: "Je vous asol de tel pooir que Diex m'a donnei" (I absolve you with such power as God may have given me). In 1524 Bayard, wounded to death, prayed before his cross-shaped sword-hilt and made his confession to his "maistre d'ostel". Neither theory nor practice was erroneous from a Catholic theological point of view. But when Martin Luther attacked and denied the power of the priest to administer absolution, and maintained that laymen had a similar power, a reaction set in. Luther was condemned by Pope Leo X and the council of Trent; this Council, without directly occupying itself with confession to a layman in case of necessity, defined that only bishops and priests are the ministers of absolution.

Sixteenth-century authors, while not condemning the practice, declared it dangerous, e.g. Martin Aspilcueta (Navarrus), who with Dominicus Soto says that it had fallen into desuetude. Both theory and practice disappeared by degrees; at the end of the seventeenth century there remained scarcely a memory of them.

== Lutheran view ==
In mainstream Lutheranism, the faithful often receive the sacrament of penance from a Lutheran priest before receiving the Eucharist. Prior to going to Confessing and receiving Absolution, the faithful are expected to examine their lives in light of the Ten Commandments. The order of Confession and Absolution is contained in the Small Catechism, as well as other liturgical books of the Lutheran Churches. Lutherans typically kneel at the communion rails to confess their sins, while the confessor—a Lutheran priest—listens and then offers absolution while laying their stole on the penitent's head. Clergy are prohibited from revealing anything said during private Confession and Absolution per the Seal of the Confessional, and face excommunication if it is violated.

However, in Laestadian Lutheranism penitent sinners, in accordance with the doctrine of the priesthood of all believers, practice lay confession, "confess[ing] their transgressions to other church members, who can then absolve the penitent."

== Anglican view ==
Within the Anglicanism, including the Anglican Communion the autonomous member churches formulate their own canons and regulations. Although this can lead to some variation between nations, there remains a general unity based upon the doctrinal positions of the 1662 Book of Common Prayer. In relation to the reconciliation of a penitent, most churches state (either in their Canons, or in their liturgical rubrics, or both) that confession must be made to a priest. However, some member churches make provision for individual confession to a deacon or lay person when a priest is not available. As an example, the Anglican Church of Canada states, in the preface to its liturgical rite for "The Reconciliation of a Penitent", the following: "The absolution in these services may be pronounced only by a bishop or a priest. If a deacon or a lay person hears a confession, a declaration of forgiveness may be made in the form provided".

== Methodist view ==
In the Methodist Church, as with the Anglican Communion, penance is defined by the Articles of Religion as one of those "Commonly called Sacraments but not to be counted for Sacraments of the Gospel", also known as the "five lesser sacraments". John Wesley, the founder of the Methodist Church, held "the validity of Anglican practice in his day as reflected in the 1662 Book of Common Prayer", stating that "We grant confession to men to be in many cases of use: public, in case of public scandal; private, to a spiritual guide for disburdening of the conscience, and as a help to repentance." Additionally, per the recommendation of John Wesley, Methodist class meetings traditionally meet weekly in order to confess sins to one another.

The Book of Worship of The United Methodist Church contains the rite for private confession and absolution in A Service of Healing II, in which the minister pronounces the words "In the name of Jesus Christ, you are forgiven!"; (Note: A Service of Healing II, after the "Confession and Pardon", states "A Confession and Pardon from 474–94 or A Service of Word and Table V or UMH 890–93, or an appropriate psalm may be used." The words noted here are thus taken from page 52 of the Book of Worship, which details the Service of Word and Table V, specifically the conclusion of the part of the rite titled "Confession and Pardon".) some Methodist churches have regularly scheduled auricular confession and absolution, while others make it available upon request. As Methodism holds that the office of the keys to "belong to all baptized persons", private confession does not necessarily need to be made to a pastor, and therefore lay confession is permitted. Near the time of death, many Methodists confess their sins and receive absolution from an ordained minister, in addition to being anointed. In Methodism, the minister is bound by the Seal of the Confessional, with The Book of Discipline stating "All clergy of The United Methodist Church are charged to maintain all confidences inviolate, including confessional confidences"; any confessor who divulges information revealed in confession is subject to being defrocked in accordance with canon law. As with Lutheranism, in the Methodist tradition, corporate confession is the most common practice, with the Methodist liturgy including "prayers of confession, assurance and pardon". The traditional confession of The Sunday Service, the first liturgical text used by Methodists, comes from the service of Morning Prayer in The Book of Common Prayer.

The Book of Offices and Services of the Order of Saint Luke, a Methodist religious order, similarly contains a corporate Service of Prayer for Reconciliation in addition to a Rite of Reconciliation for Individual Persons. The confession of one's sin is particularly important before receiving Holy Communion; the official United Methodist publication about the Eucharist titled This Holy Mystery states that:

We respond to the invitation to the Table by immediately confessing our personal and corporate sin, trusting that, “If we confess our sins, He who is faithful and just will forgive us our sins and cleanse us from all unrighteousness” (1 John 1:9). Our expression of repentance is answered by the absolution in which forgiveness is proclaimed: “In the name of Jesus Christ, you are forgiven!”

Many Methodists, like other Protestants, regularly practice confession of their sin to God Himself, holding that "When we do confess, our fellowship with the Father is restored. He extends His parental forgiveness. He cleanses us of all unrighteousness, thus removing the consequences of the previously unconfessed sin. We are back on track to realise the best plan that He has for our lives."

== See also ==
- Spiritual direction
