= Seal of the Confessional =

The Seal of the Confessional (also Seal of Confession or Sacramental Seal) is a Christian doctrine forbidding a priest from disclosing any information learned from a penitent during Confession. This doctrine is recognized by several Christian denominations:

- Seal of the Confessional (Anglicanism)
- Seal of confession in the Catholic Church
- Seal of the Confessional (Lutheran Church)

== See also ==
- Priest–penitent privilege – legal recognition of privacy of confession
