= Seal of the Confessional (Lutheran Church) =

The Seal of the Confessional is a Christian doctrine which affirms the special protection and privilege of the words spoken during confession between a penitent (church member) and his or her pastor. A form of this principle exists in the doctrine and practice of many modern Lutheran churches.

== History ==
The Roman Catholic priest and Reformer Martin Luther initially proclaimed in his teaching that three sacraments should be preserved in the reformed church, namely baptism, the eucharist and confession; Lutheran Christians today do not all agree on the number of sacraments, but many include confession as a sacramental act.

Some of the Nordic churches at the time of the Reformation maintained virtually all aspects of their catholic faith and order, whilst breaking their links with the Pope. Later, these churches formally constituted themselves as Lutheran, the Church of Sweden doing so, for example, at The Convocation of Uppsala in 1593. There was a continuing de facto respect for principles such as the Seal of the Confessional, not least because it took the Nordic people a long time to promulgate any ecclesiastical law of their own. The first post-reformation ecclesiastical laws in the Kingdom of Sweden were not promulgated until 1686.

== Contemporary practice ==
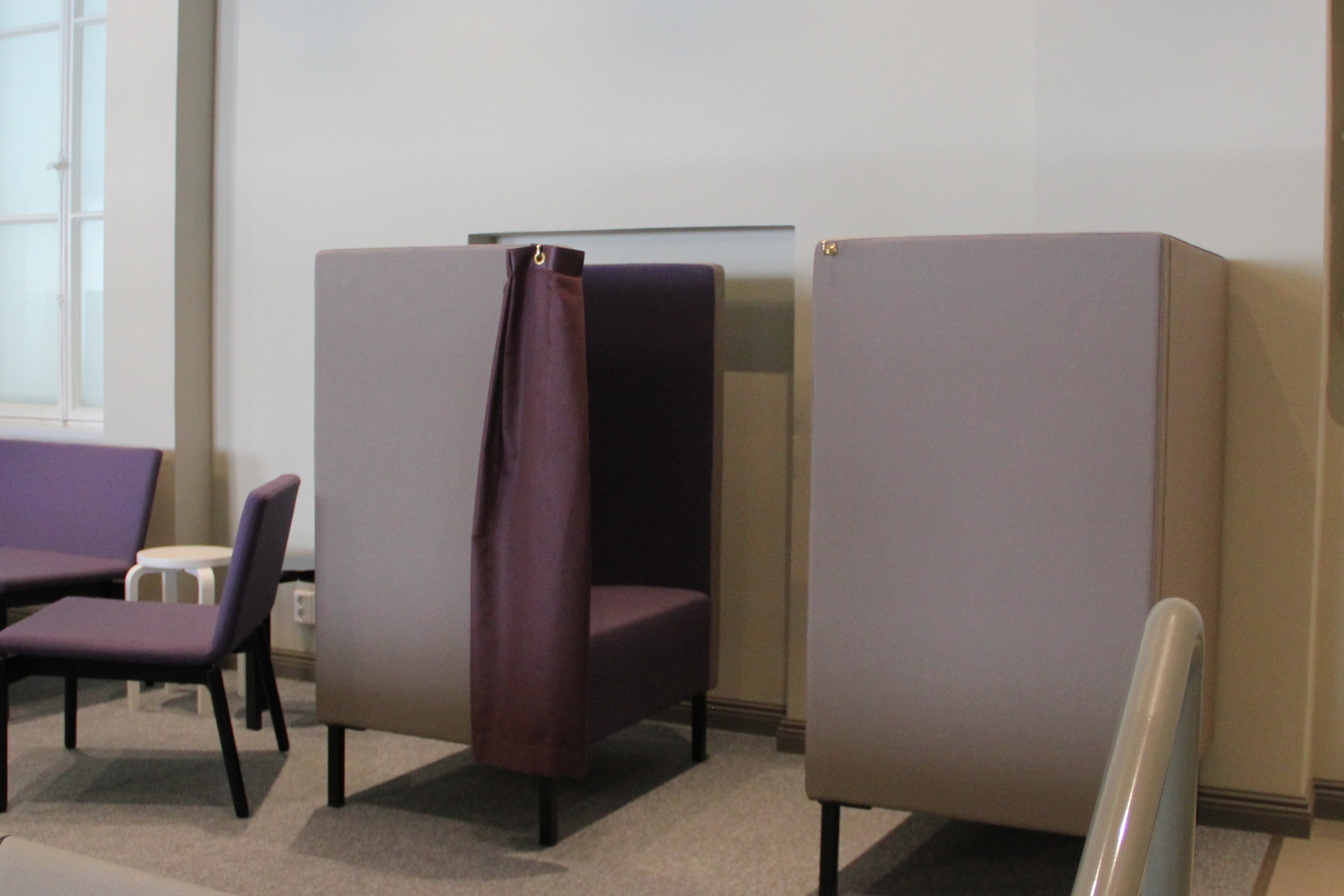
A confessional in Luther Church (Helsinki, Finland)

In a manner very similar to the Catholic Church, the practice of private confession in the Nordic and Baltic Lutheran churches is an important part of their faith for some church members, though less practiced by others. There is a huge range of attitudes towards the practice. However, where it is practiced, there is an understanding among the clergy that there is an inviolable confidence between the individual priest and the penitent. In continental Lutheran practice private confession is less common, but still present.

Although the Lutheran Confessions do not make explicit mention of the seal of the confessional, later texts do address this doctrine. An Explanation of Luther's Small Catechism, an expansion of this primary source of Lutheran doctrine widely used for teaching in the Lutheran Church-Missouri Synod, says the following in regards to the Seal of the Confessional:

The pastor is pledged not to tell anyone else of sins to him in private confession, for those sins have been removed.

In regard to individual confession and forgiveness, Evangelical Lutheran Worship, the current service book of the Evangelical Lutheran Church in America states, "There is a confidential nature to this order, in keeping with the discipline and practice of the Lutheran church."

== See also ==
- Seal of the Confessional (Catholic Church)
- Seal of the Confessional (Anglican Church)
- Lay confession
