= Confession (Lutheranism) =

Religious method for seeking forgiveness

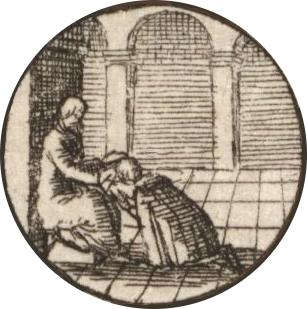
"Private Absolution ought to be retained in the churches, although in confession an enumeration of all sins is not necessary." —Augsburg Confession, Article 11

In the Lutheran tradition, Confession (also called Holy Absolution) is the sacrament given by Christ to the Church by which individual men and women may receive the forgiveness of sins. According to the Large Catechism, the third sacrament of Holy Absolution is related to Holy Baptism.

In the Lutheran churches, the Office of the Keys exercised through confession and absolution is the "authority which Christ has given to His Church on earth: to forgive the sins of the penitent sinners, but to retain the sins of the impenitent as long as they do not repent."

== Beliefs ==
The Lutheran Church practices "Confession and Absolution" [referred to as the Office of the Keys] with the emphasis on the absolution, which is God's word of forgiveness. Indeed, Lutherans highly regard Holy Absolution. They, like Roman Catholics, see James 5:16 and John 20:22–23 as biblical evidence for confession. Confession and absolution is done in private to the pastor, called the "confessor" with the person confessing known as the "penitent". In confession, the penitent makes an act of contrition, as the pastor, acting in persona Christi, announces the formula of absolution. Prior to the confession, the penitent is to review the Ten Commandments to examine his or her conscience.

In the Lutheran Church, like the Roman Catholic Church, the pastor is bound by the Seal of the Confessional. Luther's Small Catechism says "the pastor is pledged not to tell anyone else of sins to him in private confession, for those sins have been removed." If the Seal is broken, it will result in excommunication. At the present time, it is, for example, expected before partaking of the Eucharist for the first time. It is also encouraged to be done frequently in a year (specifically before Easter). In many churches, times are set for the pastor to hear confessions.

The Augsburg Confession divides repentance into two parts: "One is contrition, that is, terrors smiting the conscience through the knowledge of sin; the other is faith, which is born of the Gospel, or of absolution, and believes that for Christ's sake, sins are forgiven, comforts the conscience, and delivers it from terrors."

Lutheranism has not been dogmatic regarding the number of sacraments, with the Apology of the Augsburg Confession teaching that "No intelligent person will quibble about the number of sacraments or the terminology, so long as those things are kept which have God's command and promises." As such, the number of sacraments named by Lutherans varies based on the denomination and locality. Lutherans generally speak of three sacraments, including baptism, eucharist, and confession. In line with Luther's initial statement in his Large Catechism, some Lutherans speak of two dominical sacraments, Baptism and the Eucharist, although later in the same work he calls Confession and Absolution "the third sacrament." The definition of sacrament in the Apology of the Augsburg Confession lists Absolution as one of them. Luther went to confession all his life. Certain Lutheran denominations do name seven sacraments: Holy Baptism, Holy Eucharist, Holy Confession and Absolution, Holy Orders, Holy Matrimony, Holy Confirmation, and Holy Unction. Although most Lutherans do not consider the other four rites (Holy Orders, Holy Matrimony, Holy Confirmation, and Holy Unction) as sacraments, they are still retained and used in all Lutheran churches. Regardless of the enumeration, all seven of these are celebrated in Lutheran churches.

In mainstream Lutheranism, the faithful often receive the sacrament of penance from a Lutheran priest before receiving the Eucharist. Prior to going to Confessing and receiving Absolution, the faithful are expected to examine their lives in light of the Ten Commandments. The order of Confession and Absolution is contained in the Small Catechism, as well as other liturgical books of the Lutheran churches. The sacrament of confession can variously take place in a confessional, reconciliation room, or at communion rails, all during which Lutherans confess their sins. At the same time, the confessor—a Lutheran priest—listens and then offers absolution, which may include the laying of their stole on the penitent's head. Clergy are prohibited from revealing anything said during private Confession and Absolution per the Seal of the Confessional, and face excommunication if it is violated. In Laestadian Lutheranism penitent sinners, in accordance with the doctrine of the priesthood of all believers, practice lay confession, "confess[ing] their transgressions to other church members, who can then absolve the penitent."

== Martin Luther on confession ==
In his 1529 catechisms, Martin Luther praised confession (before a pastor or a fellow Christian) "for the sake of absolution", the forgiveness of sins bestowed in an audible, concrete way. The Lutheran reformers held that a complete enumeration of sins is impossible and that one's confidence of forgiveness is not to be based on the sincerity of one's contrition nor on one's doing works of satisfaction imposed by the confessor (penance). The Roman Catholic church held confession to be composed of three parts: contritio cordis ("contrition of the heart"), confessio oris ("confession of the mouth"), and satisfactio operis ("satisfaction of deeds"). The Lutheran reformers abolished the "satisfaction of deeds," holding that confession and absolution consist of only two parts: the confession of the penitent and the absolution spoken by the confessor. Faith and trust in Jesus' complete active and passive satisfaction is what receives the forgiveness and salvation won by him and imparted to the penitent by the word of absolution.
