= In persona Christi =

Christian phrase in Latin

In persona Christi is a Latin phrase meaning "in the person of Christ", an important concept in Roman Catholicism and, similarly or in varying degrees, other Christian traditions, such as Lutheranism, Anglicanism, as well as Eastern Orthodoxy. In Catholic theology, a priest is In persona Christi because, in the sacraments he administers, it is God and Christ who acts through the instrumentality of the priest. An extended term, In persona Christi capitis, “in the person of Christ the head,” was expressed by the bishops of the Vatican Council II in the Decree on the Ministry and Live of Priests, Presbyterorum Ordinis, December 7, 1965.

== Roman Catholic understanding ==
In Roman Catholicism, the priest acts in the person of Christ in pronouncing the words that comprise part of a sacramental rite. For example, in the Mass, the Words of Institution, by which the bread becomes the Body of Christ and the wine becomes the Precious Blood, the priest acts in the person of Christ who is the head of the Church. According to the Catechism of the Catholic Church, the priest in his whole ministry serves as an "icon of Christ", being made fully visible in a particular way when he presides over the celebration of the Eucharist.

=== Recent history ===
==== Pope Pius XII (1947) ====
40. Only to the apostles, and thenceforth to those on whom their successors have imposed hands, is granted the power of the priesthood, in virtue of which they represent the person of Jesus Christ before their people, acting at the same time as representatives of their people before God….
68. The august sacrifice of the altar, then, is no mere empty commemoration of the passion and death of Jesus Christ, but a true and proper act of sacrifice, whereby the High Priest by an unbloody immolation offers Himself a most acceptable victim to the Eternal Father, as He did upon the cross. “It is one and the same victim; the same person now offers it by the ministry of His priests, who then offered Himself on the cross, the manner of offering alone being different.”
69. The priest is the same, Jesus Christ, whose sacred Person His minister represents. Now the minister, by reason of the sacerdotal consecration which he has received, is made like to the High Priest and possesses the power of performing actions in virtue of Christ's very person.

==== Bishops of Vatican Council II (1964) ====
28. … Priests, although they do not possess the highest degree of the priesthood, and although they are dependent on the bishops in the exercise of their power, nevertheless they are united with the bishops in sacerdotal dignity. By the power of the sacrament of Orders, in the image of Christ the eternal high Priest, they are consecrated to preach the Gospel and shepherd the faithful and to celebrate divine worship, so that they are true priests of the New Testament. Partakers of the function of Christ the sole Mediator, on their level of ministry, they announce the divine word to all. They exercise their sacred function especially in the eucharistic worship or the celebration of the Mass by which acting in the person of Christ…
29. At a lower level of the hierarchy are deacons, upon whom hands are imposed “not unto the priesthood, but unto a ministry of service”.

==== Pope Paul VI (1967) ====
29. … acting in the person of Christ, the priest unites himself most intimately with the offering, and places on the altar his entire life, which bears the marks of the holocaust.

==== Pope John Paul II (1980) ====
8. The priest offers the holy Sacrifice in persona Christi… Awareness of this reality throws a certain light on the character and significance of the priest celebrant who, by confecting the holy Sacrifice and acting “in persona Christi,” is sacramentally (and ineffably) brought into that most profound sacredness, and made part of it, spiritually linking with it in turn all those participating in the eucharistic assembly.

==== Typical Version of the Catechism of the Catholic Church (1997) ====
875: … No one can bestow grace on himself; it must be given and offered. This fact presupposes ministers of grace, authorized and empowered by Christ. From him, bishops and priests receive the mission and faculty (“the sacred power”) to act in persona Christi Capitis; deacons receive the strength to serve the people of God in the diaconia of liturgy, word, and charity, in communion with the bishop and his presbyterate. The ministry in which Christ's emissaries do and give by God's grace what they cannot do and give by their own powers, is called a “sacrament” by the Church's tradition. Indeed, the ministry of the Church is conferred by a special sacrament.”

==== Pope Benedict XVI (2007) ====
Celebrating the Chrism Mass on Holy Thursday with the priests of Rome, Pope Benedict XVI said that priests should prepare themselves thoroughly to celebrate Mass and administer the sacraments, remembering that they act in the person of Christ.

==== Code of Canon Law (1983) as modified by Benedict XVI (2009) ====
Can. 1008 By divine institution, some of the Christian faithful are marked with an indelible character and constituted as sacred ministers by the sacrament of holy orders. They are thus consecrated and deputed such that each, according to his own grade, may serve the People of God by a new and specific title.
Can. 1009

§1. The orders are the episcopate, the presbyterate, and the diaconate.
§2. They are conferred by the imposition of hands and the consecratory prayer which the liturgical books prescribe for the individual grades.
§3. Those who are constituted in the order of the episcopate or the presbyterate receive the mission and capacity to act in the person of Christ the Head, whereas deacons are empowered to serve the People of God in the ministries of the liturgy, the word and charity.

The change in Canon Law introduced by Omnium in Mentem resolved a discrepancy between the applicability of in persona Christi Capitis (“in the person of Christ the Head”) to deacons as well as priests and bishops. With the new Motu Proprio, in persona Christi Capitis applies only to priests and bishops.

=== Liturgical significance ===
The doctrine of In persona Christi affects liturgical practice. When a priest speaks to the congregation In persona Christi, the words they speak are the words of God to the Church, rather than the words of humans to God. For example, discussing the conclusion to Mass, the Office for the Liturgical Celebrations of the Supreme Pontiff has said:

Here... he acts "in persona Christi." Because of this, he does not say in the plural "may the omnipotent God bless us," or "the Mass is ended, let us go in peace." He speaks in the name of the Person of Christ and as minister of the Church, because of this he imparts the blessing, while invoking it... "may God bless you" and "Go in peace."

== Lutheran understanding ==
In Lutheran practice, when a pastor offers the sacrament of Holy Absolution, he acts in persona Christi. This informs the theology behind the seal of the confessional. Because the priest "acts in Christ’s stead when he absolves a sinner (Luke 10:16; 2 Corinthians 2:10), he acts in Christ’s stead also when he hears a confession." As such, "He may therefore not reveal what Christ Himself does not reveal” (Isaiah 43:25; Jeremiah 31:34)."

The rite for private confession and absolution in the Lutheran Service Book, the official hymnal of the Lutheran Church-Missouri Synod, contains the following words of absolution given by the pastor to the penitent:

In the stead and by the command of my Lord Jesus Christ I forgive you all your sins in the name of the Father and of the + Son and of the Holy Spirit.

To which the penitent responds:

Amen.

== Eastern Orthodox understanding ==
Like the Roman Catholic Church, the Eastern Orthodox Church considers a priest to be an icon of Christ both during ministry and in the celebration of the Eucharist. But, their conception, though similar, has traditionally placed more emphasis on the priest's role as a representative the whole people of God (sometimes referred to as "in Persona Ecclesiae"") during the celebration Eucharist.

The Roman Church does acknowledge the role of the priest's role of offering on behalf of the people, when in the 1993 Catechism it states "...there acting in the person of Christ and proclaiming his mystery, they [priests] unite the votive offerings of the faithful to the sacrifice of Christ their head..."

== See also ==
- Person of Christ
- Transubstantiation
