= Sub communione =

Sub communione is an ecclesiastical term referring to the music played during the Eucharist according to liturgics.

== Examples ==
- Samuel Scheidt, Psalmus Sub Comunione: Jesus Christus, Unser Heiland
- Johannes Sebastian Bach, Jesus Christus, unser Heiland sub Communione, BWV 665
