= Seal of the Confessional (Anglicanism) =

Confidentiality of confessions in the Anglican Church

The Seal of the Confessional is a principle within Anglicanism which protects the words spoken during confession. Confession has certain censures on disclosure as there is an understanding among the clergy that there is an inviolable confidence between the individual priest and the penitent. This principle should not be confused with the rarer practice of lay confession, nor with the public confession of sins which is an element of most eucharistic liturgies throughout the Anglican Communion. The "Seal of the Confessional" refers specifically to the private confession of sins by an individual, in the presence of a priest, the form of which is regulated by the 1662 Book of Common Prayer and later liturgical sources.

== Historical position ==
=== Before the English Reformation ===
The 1151 Decretum of Gratian, which compiles the edicts of previous councils and the principles of Church law, describes the law as to the seal of confession as follows:

Let the priest who dares to make known the sins of his penitent be deposed

— Decretum, Secunda pars, dist. VI, c. II

Gratian goes on to say that the violator of this law should be made a lifelong, ignominious wanderer.

Canon 21 of the Fourth Council of the Lateran (1215), binding on the whole Church, laid down the obligation of secrecy in the following words:

Let the priest absolutely beware that he does not by word or sign or by any manner whatever in any way betray the sinner: but if he should happen to need wiser counsel let him cautiously seek the same without any mention of person. For whoever shall dare to reveal a sin disclosed to him in the tribunal of penance we decree that he shall be not only deposed from the priestly office but that he shall also be sent into the confinement of a monastery to do perpetual penance

— Hefele-Leclercq, "Histoire des Conciles" at the year 1215; Mansi or Harduin, "Coll. conciliorum"

Neither this canon nor the law of the Decretum purports to enact for the first time the secrecy of confession. The great 15th-century English canonist William Lyndwood speaks of two reasons why a priest is bound to keep secret a confession, the first being on account of the sacrament because it is almost (quasi) of the essence of the sacrament to keep secret the confession.

=== Henry VIII and the English Reformation ===
The whole system of spiritual jurisdiction and the administration of canon law in England was transformed by the advent of the English Reformation. The reign of King Henry VIII saw the advent of an independent Church of England, constituted with the king as supreme head. The Statute of the Six Articles, passed in 1540, declared that "auricular confession is expedient and necessary to be retained and continued, used and frequented in the Church of God".

=== Canon 113 ===
Historically, the only occasion in which the confidentiality of a confession was imposed as a duty by the Church of England seems to have been in the canons that were made in 1603. Canon 113 deals with the suppression of evil deeds by the reporting thereof by the persons concerned with the administration of each parish. It provides for the presentment to the ordinary by parsons, vicars, or curates of the crimes and iniquities committed in the parish. It concludes with the following reservation:

Provided always, That if any man confess his secret and hidden sins to the minister, for the unburdening of his conscience, and to receive spiritual consolation and ease of mind from him: we do not in any way bind the said minister by this our Constitution, but do straitly charge and admonish him, that he do not at any time reveal and make known to any person whatsoever any crime or offence so committed to his trust and secrecy (except they be such crimes as by the laws of this realm his own life may be called into question for concealing the same) under pain of irregularity.

There are two points to be observed in the canon: First, there is an express exemption from the duty of secrecy where such duty should conflict with one imposed by the civil power under a certain penalty. There does not appear to have been, in fact, at that time any law which made the mere concealment of any crime, including treason, an offence punishable with forfeiture of life. This in no way affects the principle laid down in the canon. The exemption is a marked departure from the pre-Reformation ecclesiastical law on the subject as shown by the pre-Reformation English canons and otherwise. Second, even apart from the exemption, the language used to declare the injunction bears a marked contrast to the language used to declare the secrecy in pre-Reformation days. It is evident that secrecy is not quasi of the essence of confession, as William Lyndwood had declared it to be at the time which he wrote. The notion of secrecy as explained by the Fourth Lateran Council, and the English Councils of Durham and Oxford – which made stringent decrees – seems to have been ended by the English Reformation.

It results from the Submission of the Clergy Act that a canon is void if it contravenes common or statute law, and, accordingly, it becomes void if at any subsequent period a statute inconsistent with it is passed. It does not seem that there was in 1603 any statute to which canon 113 was necessarily contrariant or that any has been passed since; the common law on the topic is unclear.

== Current position ==
=== International variation ===
The Anglican Communion is an international communion and laws concerning priest-penitent privilege differ from country to country. Similarly, the different member churches of the communion each have their own canons or other governing regulations. The practice of private confession has a varying degree of importance in the different churches of the Anglican Communion; although all base their doctrinal position ultimately upon the doctrine expressed in the Book of Common Prayer (1662) which urges the use of private confession by all who "cannot quiet his own conscience" by the means of "self-examination, confession and repentance". Despite the huge range of attitudes towards the practice, there is an understanding among the clergy throughout Anglicanism that there is an inviolable confidence between the individual priest and the penitent.

=== Church of England legislation ===
In the Church of England, when new canons were introduced in 1969, they repealed most of the Canons of 1604, but Canon 113 (see above) was left unrepealed, and remains in force. The Guidelines for the Professional Conduct of the Clergy (2003), which are currently in force throughout the Church of England, state at section 7.2 "There can be no disclosure of what is confessed to a priest. This principle holds even after the death of the penitent. The priest may not refer to what has been learnt in confession, even to the penitent, unless explicitly permitted."; and add at section 7.4 "If a penitent's behaviour gravely threatens his or her well-being or that of others, the priest, while advising action on the penitent's part, must still keep the confidence".

The 21st century has presented its own set of problems and questions. The Church of England has found itself responding to social pressures for greater self-regulation of professions including such matters as a) good practice in pastoral and counseling relationships, b) dealing with data protection issues relating to the keeping of records and c) the importance of clergy being aware of legal obligations on them. On the one hand privacy concerns in the secular world have meant that personal information is to be regarded as presumed confidential. On the other hand, child abuse awareness has meant that clergy must be aware when they are under a duty to disclose information, such as where the protection of children is involved. At the same time, the absolute confidentiality of the 'seal of the confessional' is upheld.

=== Liturgical provision ===
Anglican liturgical resources, from around the world, make reference to the requirement of secrecy and the Seal of the Confessional. In the Church of England, the Common Worship provision entitled "Reconciliation and Restoration" includes two forms of service for "Reconciliation of a Penitent". The notes preceding these services state "The ministry of reconciliation requires that what is said in confession to a priest may not be disclosed". The Book of Alternative Services of the Anglican Church of Canada states: "The secrecy of a confession of sin is morally absolute for the confessor, and must under no circumstances be broken." In the Anglican Church of Southern Africa there are two rites for confession and absolution provided in the official liturgical resource 'An Anglican Prayer Book'. The preface to these states "Every priest in exercising this ministry of reconciliation, committed by Christ to his Church, is solemnly bound to observe secrecy concerning all those matters which are confessed before him".

== See also ==
- Seal of the Confessional and the Roman Catholic Church
- Seal of the Confessional and the Lutheran Church
- Priest-penitent privilege in England
