= Confirmation (Lutheranism) =

Lutheran rite

A woodcut depicting the confirmation of Lutheran youth

Confirmation in Lutheranism is a public profession of faith prepared for by long and careful instruction. In English, it may also be referred to as "affirmation of baptism", and is a mature and public reaffirmation of the faith which "marks the completion of the congregation's program of confirmation ministry".

For those in the Lutheran catechumenate, confirmation is often administered during the Easter Vigil; other popular feasts on which confirmation is celebrated include Pentecost and Feast of the Good Shepherd.

== Scriptural background ==
The Lutheran churches ground the rite of Confirmation in Matthew 10 and Romans 10:

Jesus told His disciples, that if you confess Me before men, I will confess you before My Father in heaven—but if you deny Me before men, I will deny you before My Father in heaven. The public confession of faith, and confirmation of that faith in the Church, is retained with proper catechesis and instruction in the faith, once for all delivered to the saints. (Matthew 10, Romans 10)

== Description ==
An Explanation of Luther's Small Catechism states:

Confirmation is a public rite of the Church preceded by a period of instruction designed to help baptized Christians identify with the life and mission of the Christian community. Note: Prior to admission to the Eucharist, it is necessary to be instructed in the Christian faith (1 Cor. 11:28). The rite of confirmation provides an opportunity for the individual Christian, relying on God's promise given in Holy Baptism, to make a personal public confession of the faith and a lifelong pledge of fidelity to Christ.

== Rite ==
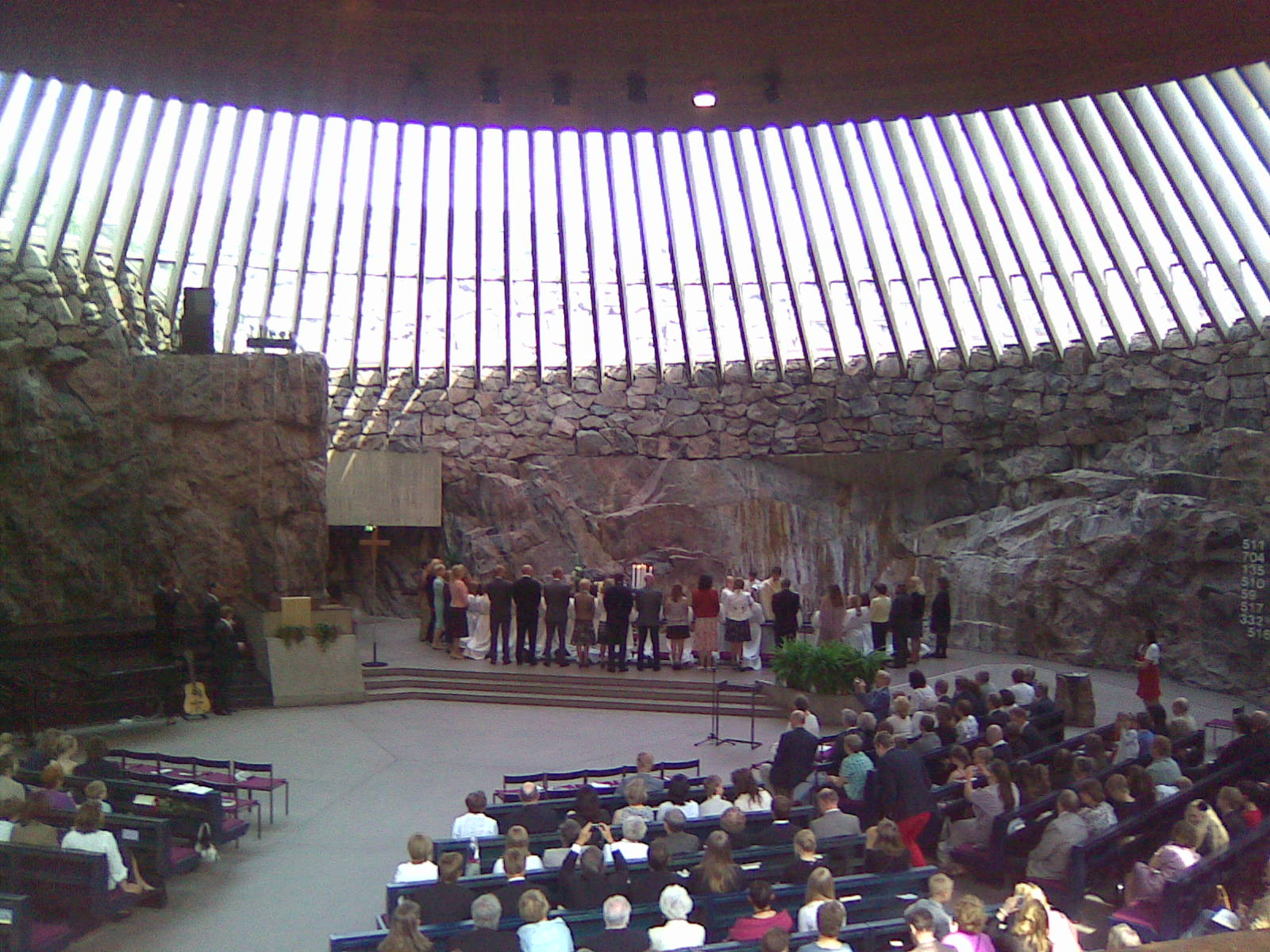
A Lutheran confirmation service, Temppeliaukio Church, Helsinki.

The Rite of Confirmation encourages the individual Christian, relying on God's promise given in Baptism, to make a public profession of the faith and a lifelong pledge of faithfulness to Christ. Confirmation teaches baptized Christians, who wish to become Lutheran, the Church's theology on the Ten Commandments, the Apostles' Creed and the Lord's Prayer, as well as Lutheran doctrine on the sacraments of Baptism, Confession, and the Eucharist.

The Rite of Confirmation includes:

The confirmands are addressed.
The Creed.
Confirmation vows.
Blessing of each confirmand.

The Lord’s Prayer.

The Lutheran rite of confirmation enjoins the laying on of hands upon each of the candidates, with certain Missals such as Evangelical Lutheran Worship including an invocation of the Holy Spirit to stir up in the confirmands the Gifts of the Holy Spirit received in the sacrament of Holy Baptism: "Stir up in them the gift of your Holy Spirit: the spirit of wisdom and understanding, the spirit of counsel and might, the spirit of knowledge and the fear of the Lord, the spirit of joy in your presence, both now and forever."

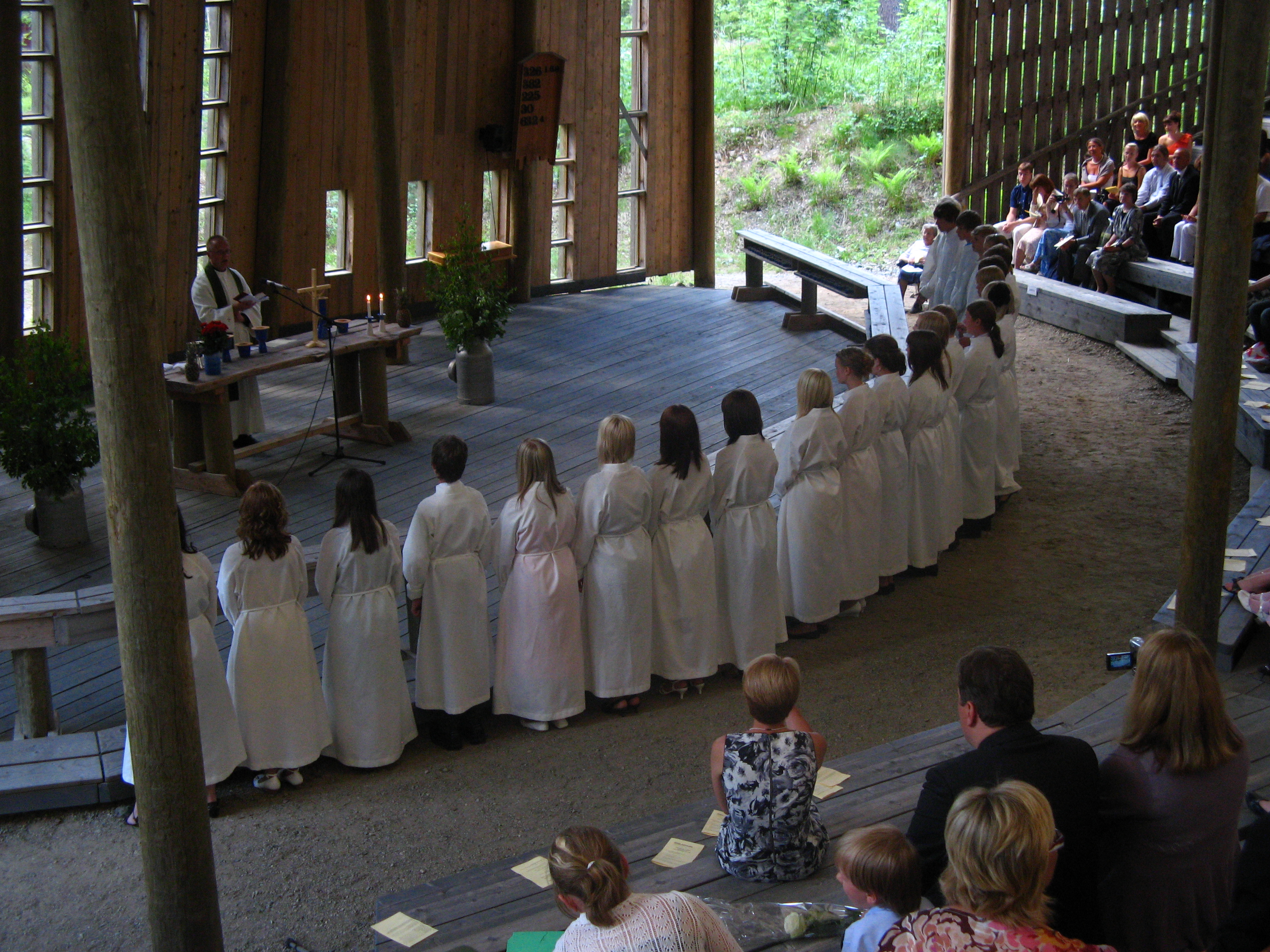
Confirmation in Aholansaari outdoor church in Nilsiä, Kuopio

Similar to the Roman Catholic tradition, some Lutheran congregations instruct the very young (such as age 7) in understanding the Eucharist and then receive First Communion before beginning the Confirmation process several years later. (Other Lutheran congregations confirm children at about the 5th grade, or the 8th grade, if they are of the LCMS Lutheran synod, after which they take their first Holy Communion.) At the conclusion of this catechetical instruction, young persons traditionally make a public profession of their faith in a public ceremony. Students often begin taking catechism classes at about age twelve and are usually confirmed at age fourteen. At present, certain Lutheran theologians are investigating the allowance of the practice of the Eastern church to confirm/chrismate at baptism, including infants.

Lutherans do not accept the belief that only a bishop can confirm, as is the custom in the Anglican tradition. Even in countries where Lutherans claim to retain apostolic succession, such as Denmark, Estonia, Finland, Kenya, Norway and Sweden etc., a priest (pastor) is allowed to confirm.

== See also ==
- Lutheran sacraments
- Confirmation (Catholic Church)
