= Luther's Large Catechism =

Catechism by Martin Luther

Der Große Katechismus
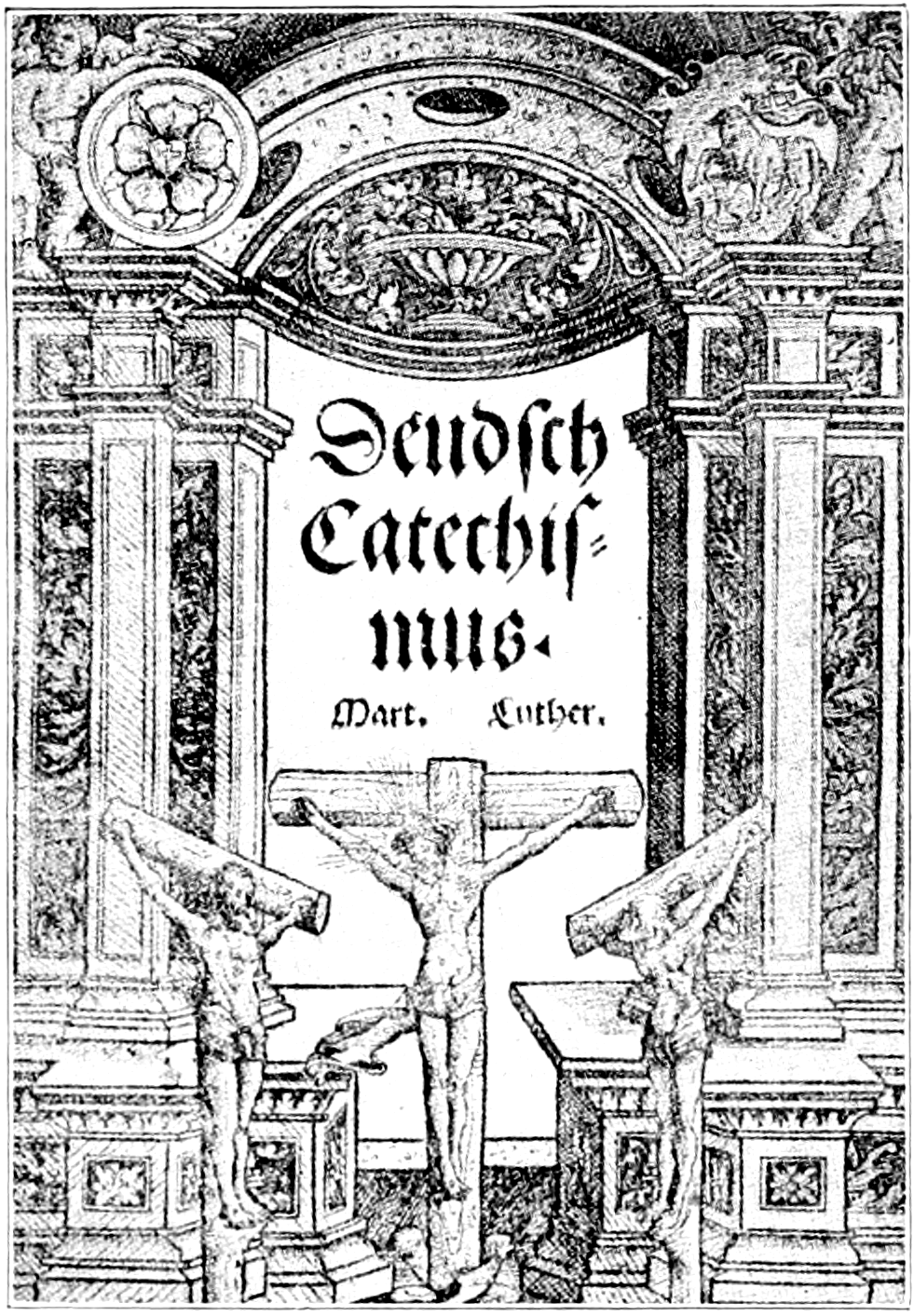
- Title page of the first edition of Luther's Large Catechism (Wittenberg 1529)
- Original title: Deudsch Catechismus
- Language: German
- Publication date: 1529

Luther's Large Catechism (German: Der Große Katechismus) is a catechism by Martin Luther. It consists of works written by Luther and compiled Christian canonical texts, published in April 1529. This book was addressed particularly to clergymen to aid them in teaching their congregations, and to fathers for instructing their families. Luther's Large Catechism is divided into five parts: The Ten Commandments, The Apostles' Creed, The Lord's Prayer, Holy Baptism, and The Sacrament of the Eucharist. The Large Catechism, along with related documents, was published in the Book of Concord in 1580.

The author stipulates in the preface:

Therefore it is the duty of every father of a family to question and examine his children and servants at least once a week and to ascertain what they know of [this catechism], or are learning, and, if they do not know it, to keep them faithfully at it.

Luther adds:

However, it is not enough for them to comprehend and recite these parts according to the words only, but the young people should also be made to attend the preaching, especially during the time which is devoted to the Catechism, that they may hear it explained and may learn to understand what every part contains, so as to be able to recite it as they have heard it, and, when asked, may give a correct answer, so that the preaching may not be without profit and fruit.

== See also ==
- Luther's Small Catechism
