= Eucharist in Lutheranism =

Christian sacrament, as practiced by Lutherans

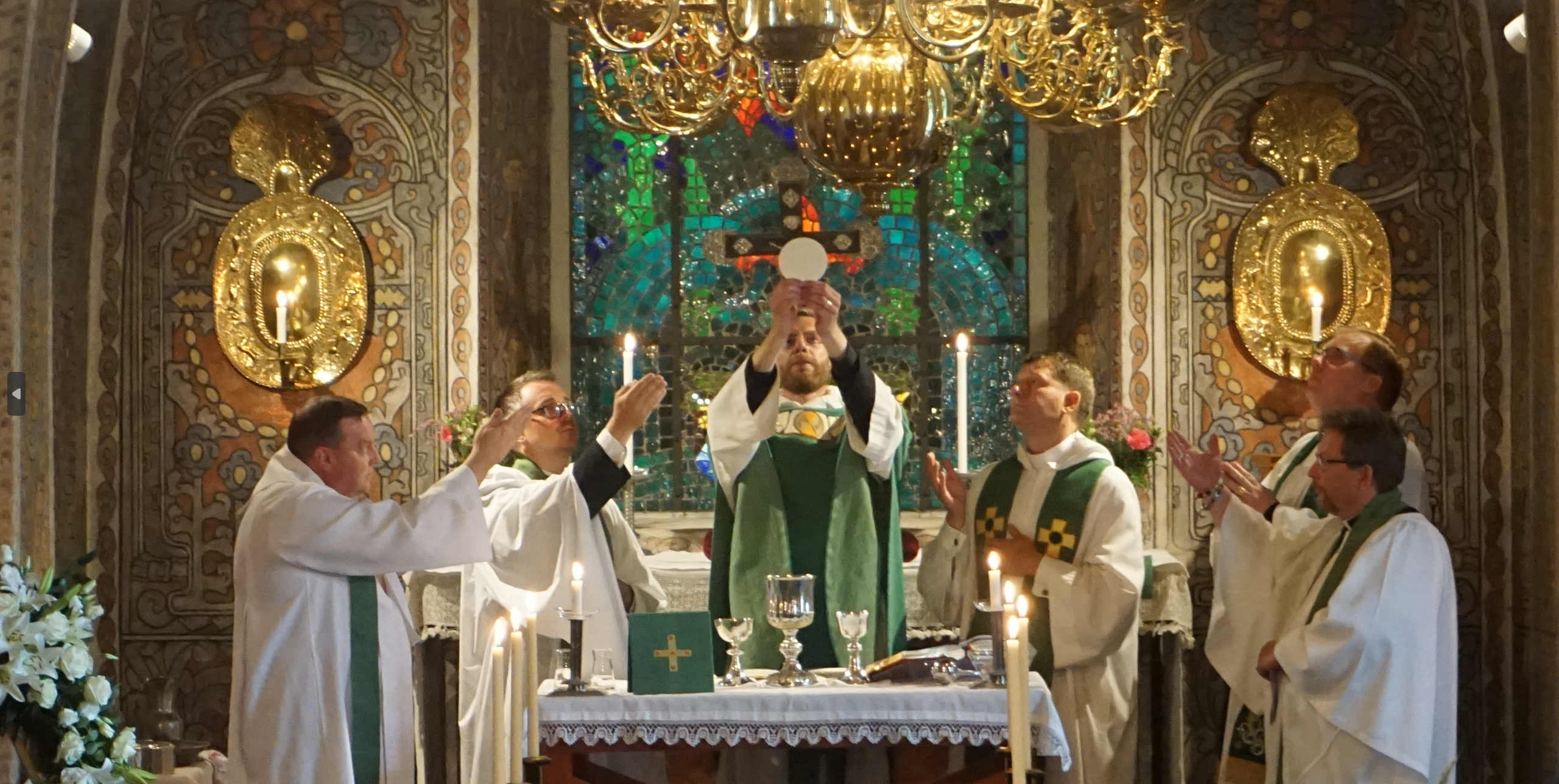
Lutheran priest elevating the host during the Holy Mass at Alsike Church, Sweden

In the Lutheran Churches, the Eucharist (also called the Mass, the Sacrament of the Altar, the Lord's Supper, the Lord's Table, Holy Communion, the Breaking of the Bread, and the Blessed Sacrament) refers to the liturgical commemoration of the Last Supper. Lutherans believe in the real presence of Christ in the Eucharist, affirming the doctrine of sacramental union, "in which the body and blood of Christ are truly and substantially (vere et substantialiter) present, offered, and received with the bread and wine."

== Beliefs ==
The Eucharist is based on the events of Matthew 26:26–28, Mark 14:22–24, Luke 22:19–20, and 1 Corinthians 11:23–29.

=== Real presence of Christ in the Eucharist: sacramental union ===
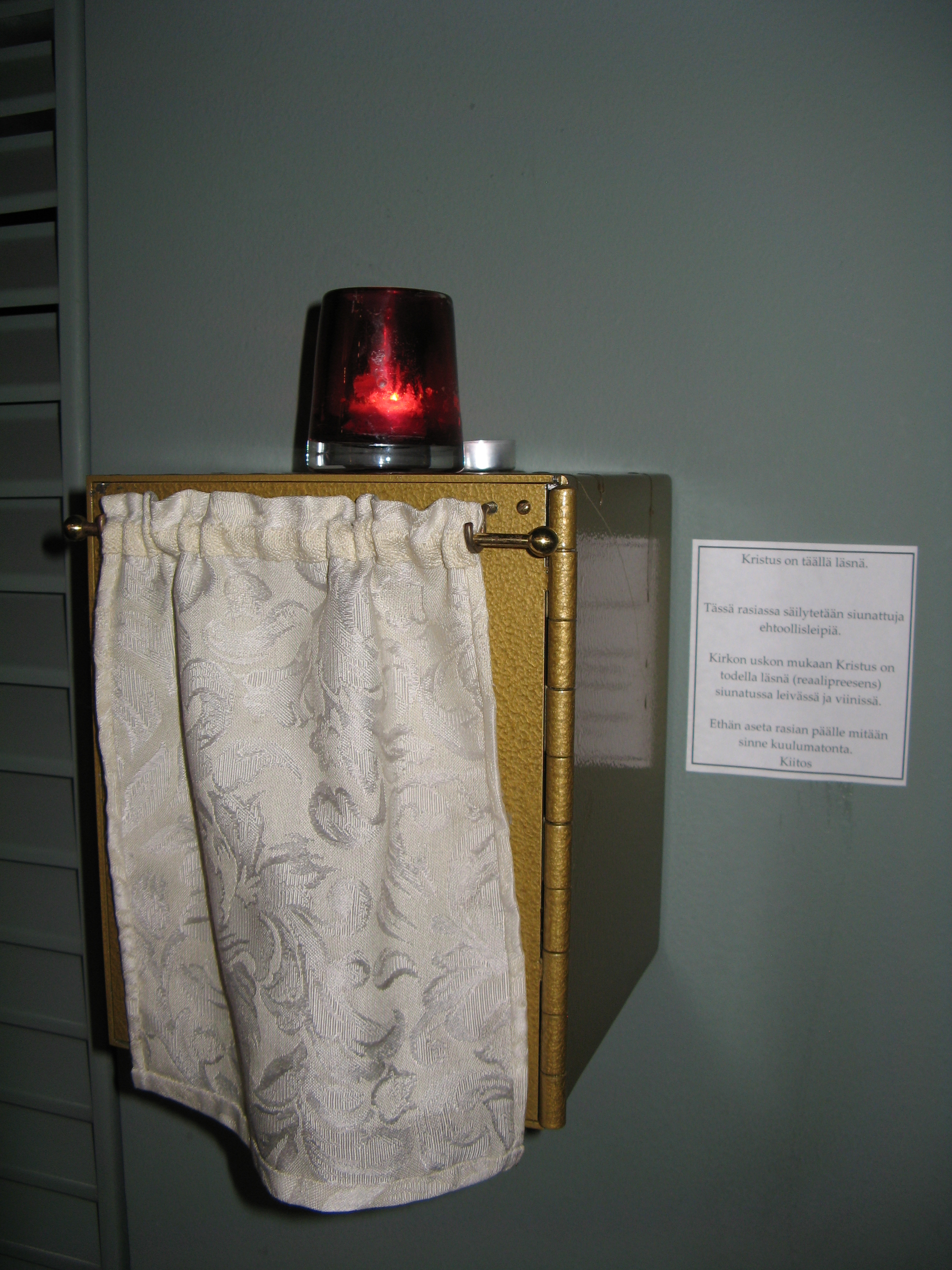
A note about the real presence in Mikael Agricola Church, Helsinki

Lutherans believe that the Body and Blood of Christ are "truly and substantially present in, with and under the forms" of consecrated bread and wine (the elements), so that communicants eat and drink both the elements and the true Body and Blood of Christ himself in the Sacrament of the Eucharist whether they are believers or unbelievers. The Lutheran doctrine of the Real Presence is also known as the sacramental union. This theology was first formally and publicly confessed in the Wittenberg Concord (1536). It has been called "consubstantiation", but Lutheran theologians reject the use of this term "since Lutherans do not believe either in that local conjunction of two bodies, nor in any commingling of bread and of Christ's body, of wine and of his blood." Lutherans use the term "in, with, and under the forms of consecrated bread and wine" and "sacramental union" to distinguish their understanding of the Eucharist from those of the Reformed and other traditions. The real presence of Christ is effected at the Words of Institution:

Throughout his writings, Martin Luther insisted that after the words of institution were spoken, by the power of God’s Word, the true presence of Christ’s Body and Blood had been united to the bread and wine. Particularly interesting writings include his 1520 On the Babylonian Captivity of the Church, where Luther affirmed that the Body and Blood of Christ were present at the time of the elevation—when the pastor raises the host and the chalice after the words of institution.

=== Sacrifice ===
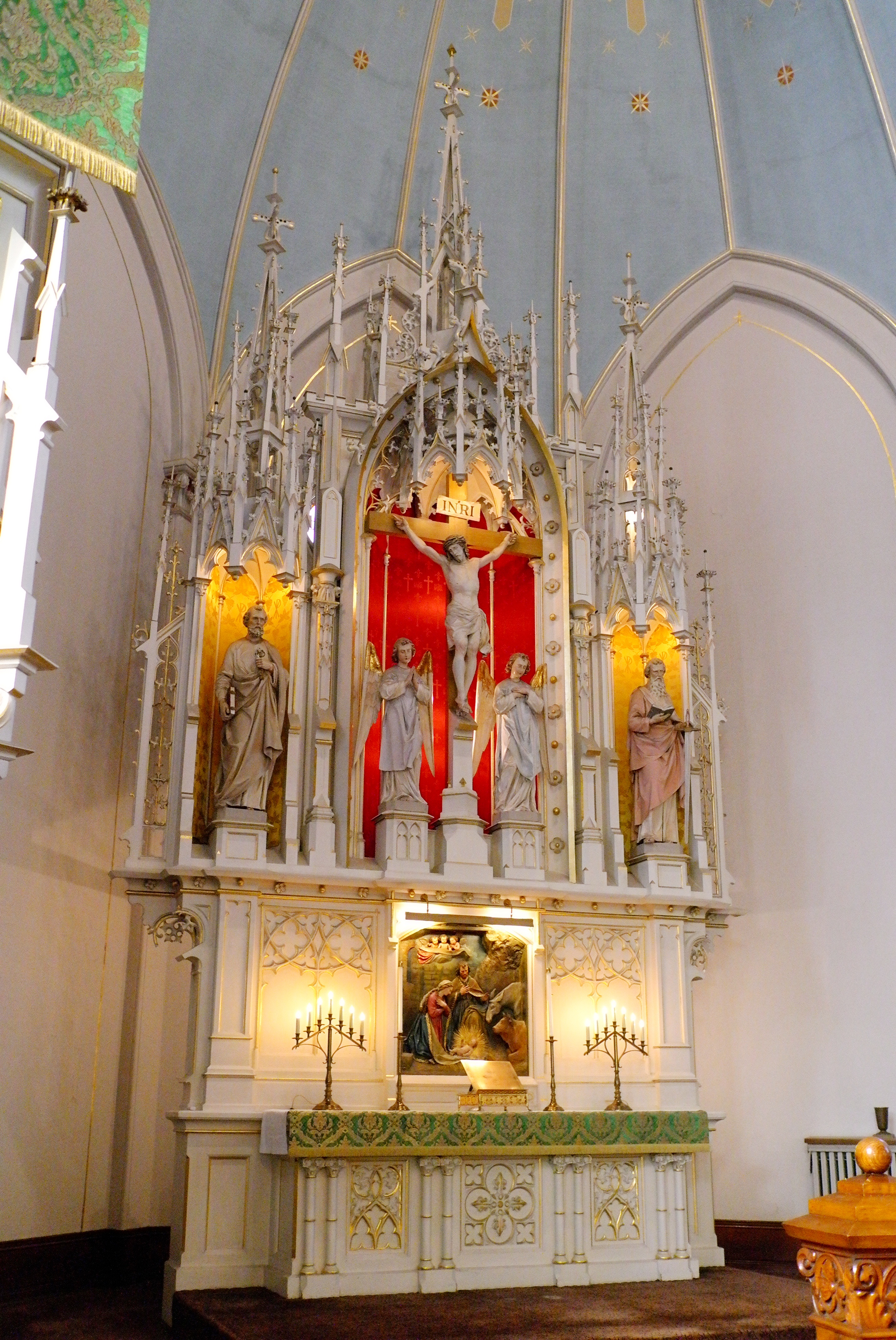
The high altar of Saint John's Evangelical Lutheran Church, a parish of the Wisconsin Evangelical Lutheran Synod in Milwaukee

Lutherans affirm that the Sacrifice of the Mass (sacrificium eucharistikon) is a sacrifice of thanksgiving and praise (sacrificia laudis):

We are perfectly willing for the Mass to be understood as a daily sacrifice, provided this means the whole Mass, the ceremony and also the proclamation of the Gospel, faith, prayer, and thanksgiving. Taken together, these are the daily sacrifice of the New Testament; the ceremony was instituted because of them and ought not be separated from them. Therefore Paul says (I Cor. 11:26), "As often as you eat this bread and drink the cup, you proclaim the Lord's death." (Apology XXIV:35)

Lutherans affirm that the Eucharist is a sacrifice "in the sense that 1) it is Christ, not the celebrant priest, who offers and is offered as the sacrifice, 2) Christ's sacrifice of atonement is made once and for all with respect to God, and 3) it is sacramentally enacted so that its benefits are distributed to the believers each and every time the Eucharist is celebrated." Additionally, during the Mass, Lutherans hold that the faithful gathered offer themselves as "living sacrifices to God". The Lutheran dogmatician David Hollatz summarizes the teaching of the Church on the Eucharistic Sacrifice:

If we view the matter from the material standpoint, the sacrifice in the Eucharist is numerically the same as the sacrifice that took place on the cross; put otherwise, one can say that the things itself and the substance is the same in each case, the victim or oblation is the same. If we view the matter formally, from the standpoint of the act of sacrifice, then even though the victim is numerically the same, the action is not; that is, the immolation in the Eucharist is different from the immolation carried out on the cross. For on the cross an offering was made by means of the passion and death of an immolated living thing, without which there can be no sacrifice in the narrow sense, but in the Eucharist the oblation takes place through the prayers and through the commemoration of the death or sacrifice offered on the cross. (Examen theologicum acroamaticum, II, 620)

The Lutheran Small Catechism teaches that the sacrament of the Eucharist remits sin and is salvific:

These words, "Given and shed for you for the forgiveness of sins," show us that in the Sacrament forgiveness of sins, life, and salvation are given us through these words. For where there is forgiveness of sins, there is also life and salvation.

The Swedish Lutheran priest Gunnar Rosendal wrote:

In the Church Order we read: ... "the Sacrifice of Christ, which was offered by our Lord on the cross, is offered in the Mass." Those words in the Swedish Church Order were written by Archbishop Laurentius Petri, the first Archbishop, following the reformation. He wrote a Dialogus about the Holy Eucharist, where he says that we may call the Mass a sacrifice, because "it signifies or represents the Sacrifice of our Lord on the cross" and because "the Priest and the congregation hold it (the Sacrament, id est, the Body and Blood) between our sins and the wrath of God." It is quite clear that we have here a full and explicit doctrine of the Sacrifice of the Mass. That also implies that the Priest ordained for the offering of this Sacrifice is a real Priest, partaker of the same Priesthood as our Lord, the heavenly High Priest.

=== Use of the sacrament ===
For Lutherans the Eucharist is not considered to be a valid sacrament unless the elements are used according to Christ's mandate and institution (consecration, distribution, and reception). This was first formulated in the Wittenberg Concord of 1536 in the formula: Nihil habet rationem sacramenti extra usum a Christo institutum ("Nothing has the character of a sacrament apart from the use instituted by Christ"). To remove any hint of doubt or superstition, the reliquiæ traditionally are either consumed, poured into the earth, or reserved (see below). In most Lutheran congregations, the administration of private communion of the sick and "shut-in" (those too feeble to attend services) involves a completely separate service of the Eucharist for which the sacramental elements are consecrated by the celebrant.

Lutheran churches typically offer the Eucharist at least weekly, especially on the Lord's Day, though daily Mass is celebrated in some Lutheran churches, as well as at Lutheran convents and monasteries, such as Östanbäck Monastery and Saint Augustine's House. The Augsburg Confession teaches that in Lutheran churches the sacrament of the Eucharist is to be celebrated at least every Lord's Day, with the sacrament of confession being offered beforehand. Weddings and funerals often include the celebration of the Eucharist, but at the ordinations of pastors/priests and the consecration of bishops, the Eucharist is nearly always celebrated.

== Practices ==
=== Eucharistic fast ===
The Small Catechism, with regard to the Eucharistic Fast, states: "Fasting and bodily preparation are indeed a fine outward training". Though voluntary, the Eucharistic Fast is kept from midnight until the reception of the Eucharist. Theologically, the "Eucharistic Fast is always in anticipation for the Eucharistic Feast, a reminder of the Last Day when all poverty is abolished, the necessity of fasting has ceased and every prayer answered as all of God's people celebrate the marriage supper of the Lamb."

=== Confession and absolution ===
For Lutherans in general, confession and absolution are considered proper preparation for receiving the sacrament. The Book of Concord, the compendium of Lutheran dogma, teaches: "Among us…the sacrament is available for all who wish to partake of it after they have been examined and absolved." Traditionally, Lutheran churches have offered the sacrament of confession on Saturdays so that individuals are able receive the Eucharist on the following day.

Certain congregations include a General Confession at the start of the Holy Mass.

=== First Communion ===
A growing number of congregations in the ELCA, offer instruction to baptized children generally between the ages of 6–8 and, after a relatively short period of catechetical instruction, the children are admitted to partake of the Eucharist. Most other ELCA congregations offer First Communion instruction to children in the 5th or 6th grade (ages about 10-11). In other Lutheran churches, the person must have received confirmation before receiving the Eucharist. Infants and children who have not received the catechetical instruction (or confirmation) may be brought to the Eucharistic distribution by their parents to be blessed by the pastor.

=== Open and closed communion ===
The congregations of the North American Lutheran Church (NALC) and the Evangelical Lutheran Church in America (ELCA) practice open communion—meaning that Holy Communion is offered to all those who are baptized. Congregations in the Lutheran Church–Missouri Synod (LCMS) and the Wisconsin Evangelical Lutheran Synod (WELS) practice closed communion (close is used by some in place of closed), meaning that Lutheran catechetical instruction is required for all people before receiving the Eucharist, though some congregations in these synods simply either ask that one speak to the pastor before the service to confirm their common faith or acknowledge this on their attendance card.

== Eucharistic elements ==
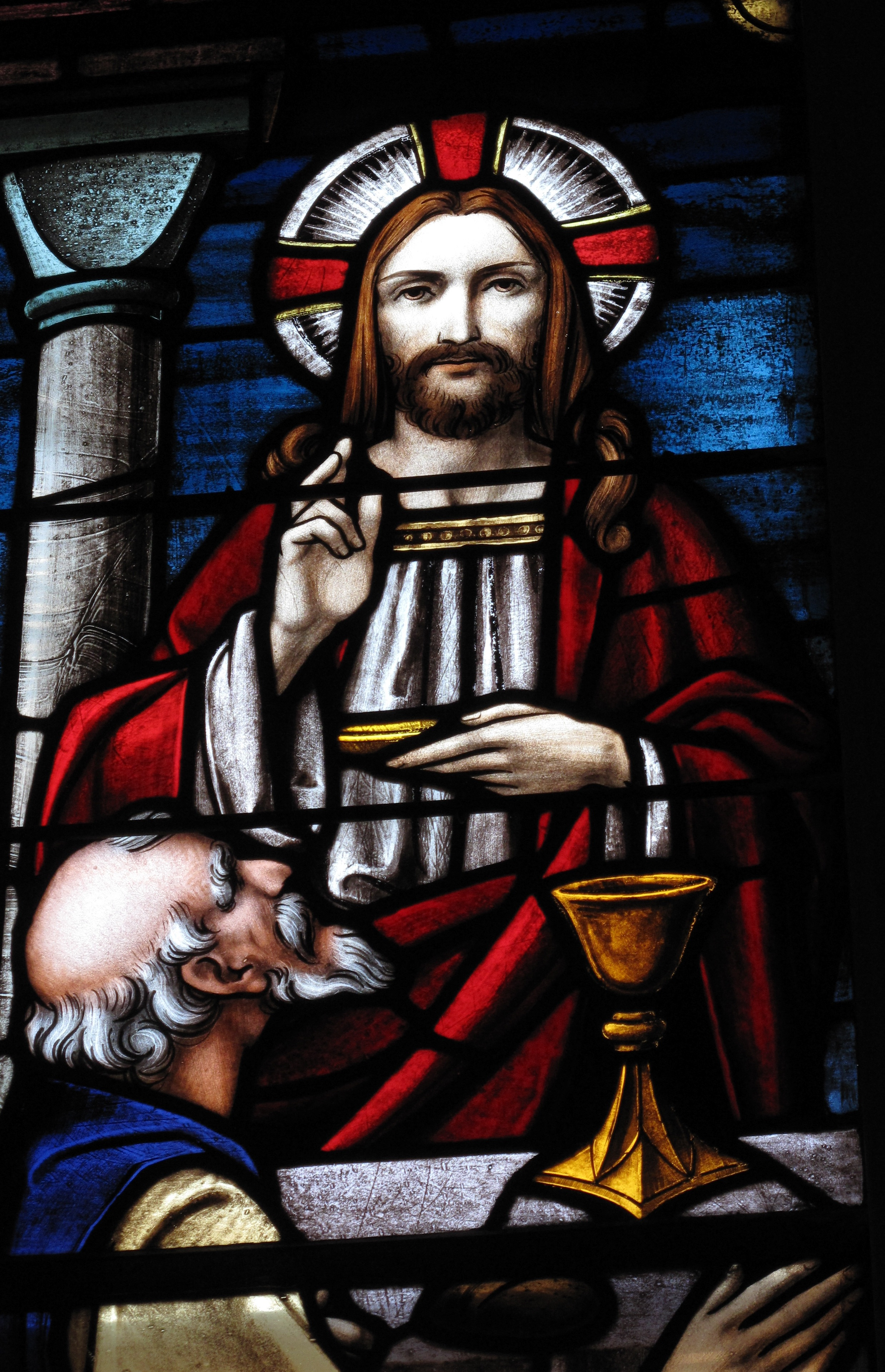
The Holy Communion stained glass window at St. Matthew's German Evangelical Lutheran Church in Charleston, South Carolina

In the Lutheran Churches that use the Western Rite, unleavened bread is typically used for the celebration of the Eucharist (as in the Jewish Passover); these are called hosts. Hosts are made by a number of Lutheran religious orders, as well as monks and nuns, to support their religious communities. Lutheran seminaries and religious goods stores, such as the Concordia Publishing House, make hosts as well. Hosts often contain a cross, crucifix or IHS Christogram on them. The Eastern Lutheran Churches use leavened bread for the prosphora. The Lutheran Churches use sacramental wine in the Eucharist, and this may be mingled with water in the chalice during the Mass:

... there is scriptural support for the practice of mixing wine with water in that both water and blood flow from Christ's side, and also in Proverbs, in which Wisdom (which is Christ) calls us to eat of His bread and drink of the wine He has mixed. In following the teaching of scripture and the historic church, proper practice for communion should be to use wine mixed with water.

== Manner of reception ==
A congregation kneeling during the Eucharistic distribution

The manner of receiving the Eucharist differs throughout the world. In most Lutheran churches, an older Latin Rite custom is maintained in which the communicants kneel on cushions at the altar rail. In Lutheranism, acolytes assist the priest by carrying a paten under the chin of each of the faithful as they receive the Body of Christ. In other Lutheran churches, the process is much like the Post-Vatican II revised rite of the Roman Catholic Church. The priest (pastor) and the eucharistic ministers line up, with the priest in the center holding the hosts and the two eucharistic ministers on either side holding the chalices. The people process to the front in lines and receive the Eucharist standing. Following this, the people make the sign of the cross and return to their places in the congregation. Traditionally only those within the Office of the Holy Ministry distributed the Blessed Sacrament, but it has become common for lay people known as eucharistic ministers to assist in the distribution.

The host is traditionally thin unleavened wafer, but leavened wafers or bread may be used. Traditionally, the minister placed the host on the tongue of the communicant, with the communicants not even touching the base of the chalice as they received the Blood of Christ. More recently, it has become common for the laity to receive the host in the hand. Some parishes use intinction, the dipping of the host into the chalice.

The wine is commonly administered from a common chalice, but some congregations offer individual cups as well. These may be either prefilled or filled from a pouring chalice during the distribution of the Eucharist. Some ELCA congregations make grape juice available for children and those who are abstaining from alcohol and some will accommodate those with an allergy to wheat, gluten, or grapes.

Upon receiving the Body and Blood, it is common for communicants to make the sign of the cross.

== Liturgy ==
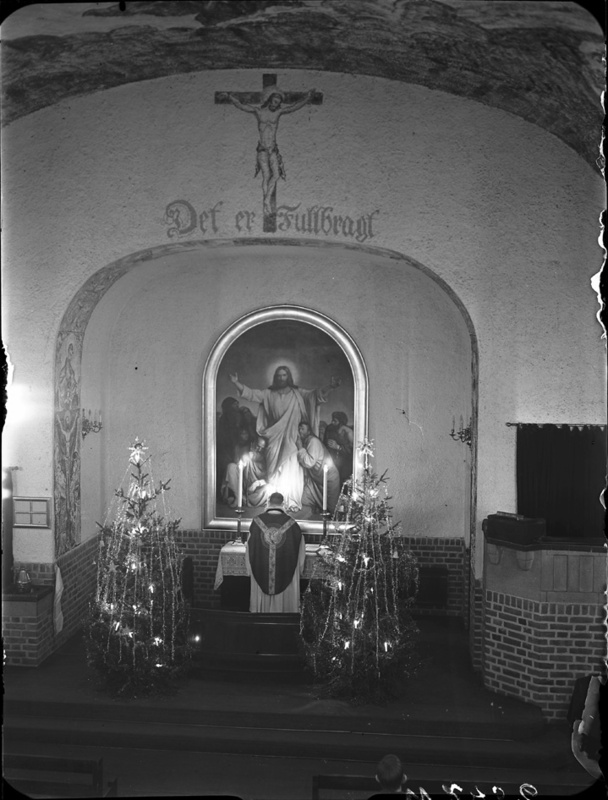
The Holy Mass being celebrated ad orientem by a Lutheran priest on Christmas Day in Norway (1942)

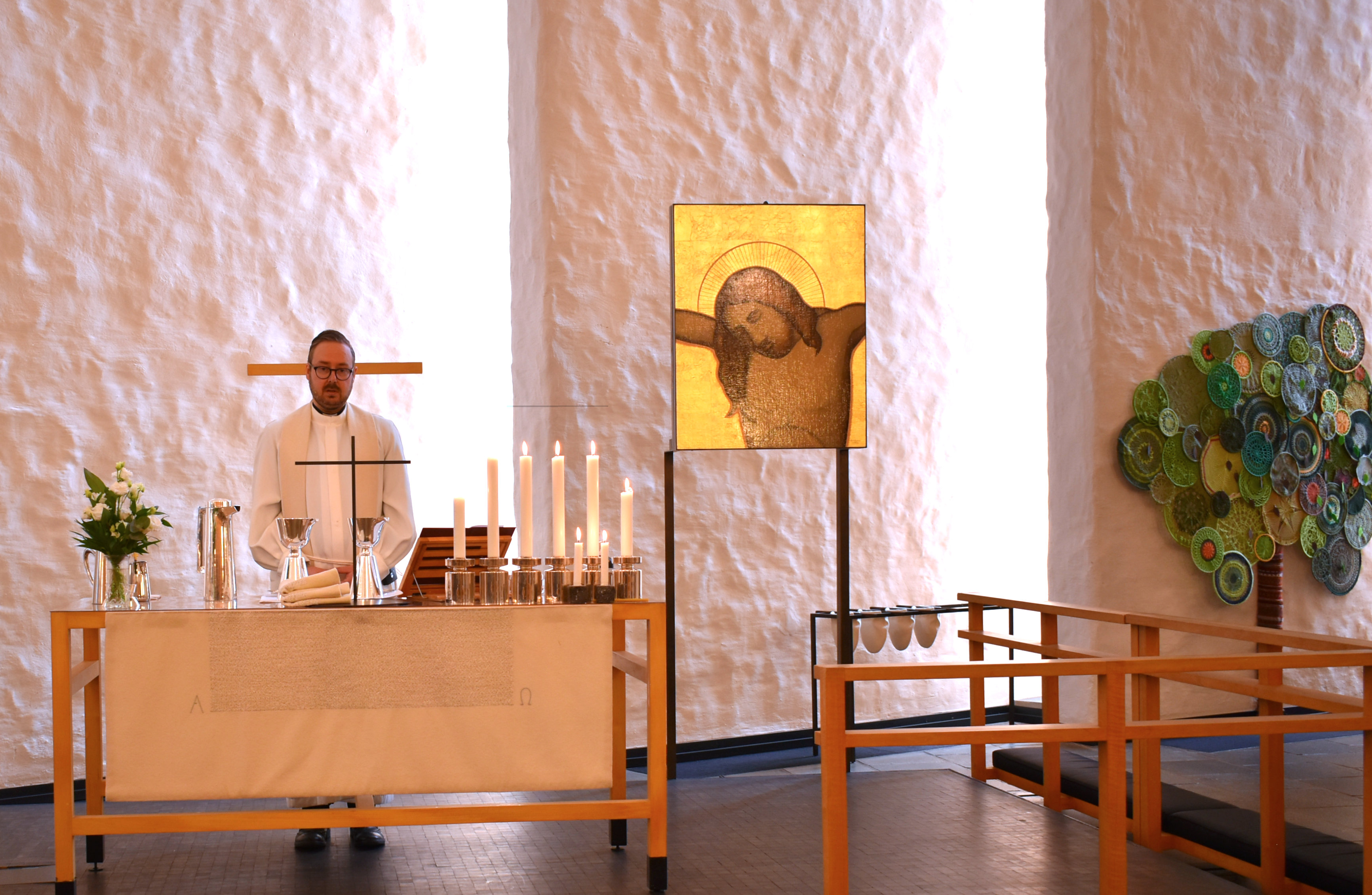
A Lutheran priest celebrates the Holy Mass versus populum at Korso Lutheran Church in Finland

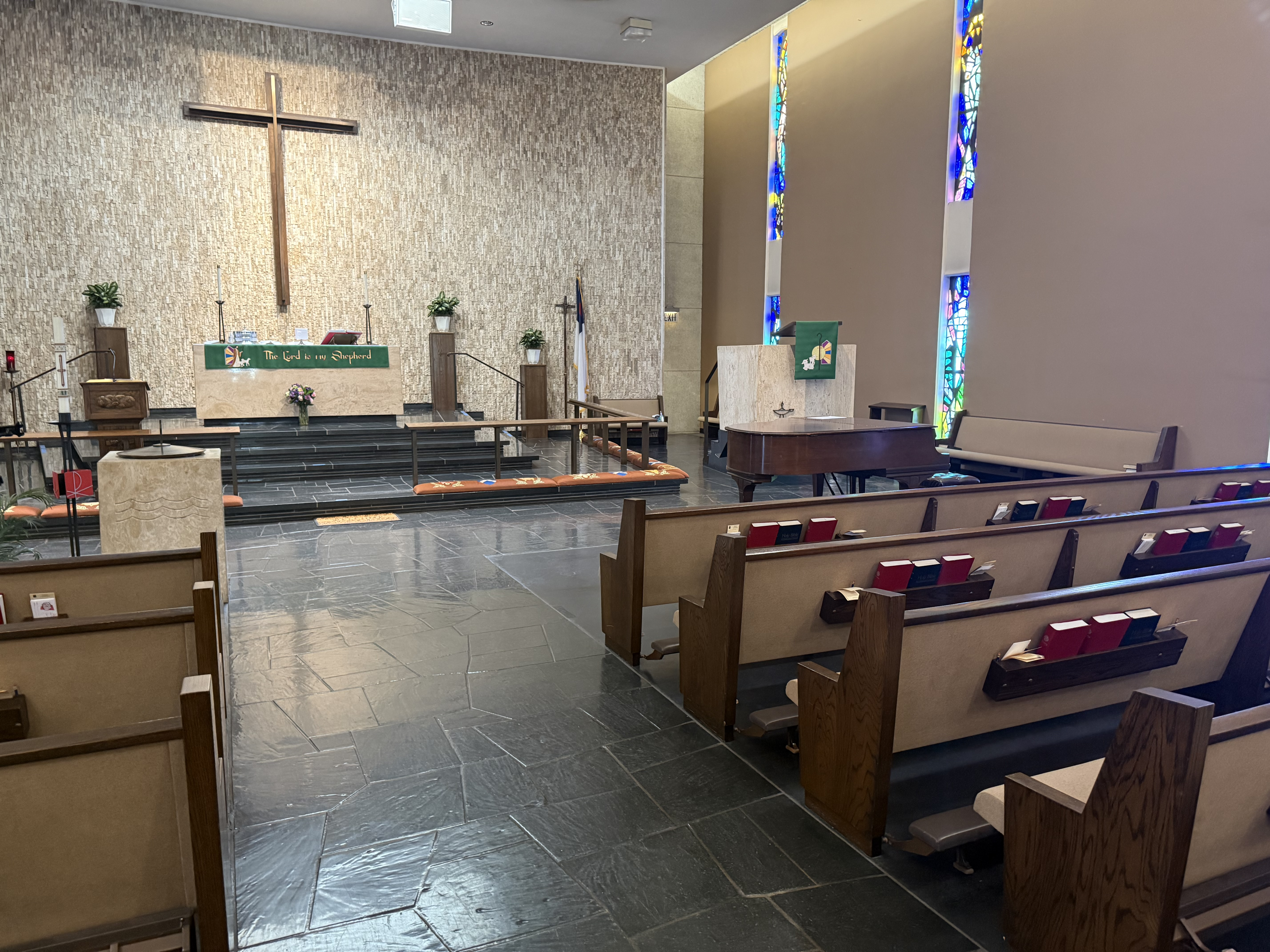
During the offering of the Mass, it is common for Evangelical-Lutherans to kneel after the Sanctus and the Agnus Dei; as such, a number of the pews of Evangelical-Lutheran churches have kneelers (depicted is St. Andrew Lutheran Church in Whittier, California).

The Lutheran worship liturgy is called the "Mass", "Divine Service", "Holy Communion", or "the Eucharist". An example formula for the Lutheran liturgy as found in the Lutheran Service Book of the LCMS is as follows:

The "Great Thanksgiving" or Sursum corda is chanted or spoken.

Pastor: The Lord be with you.

People: And also with you.

Pastor: Lift up your hearts.

People: We lift them up unto the Lord.

Pastor: Let us give thanks to the Lord our God.

People: It is right to give Him thanks and praise.

Next, the proper preface is chanted or spoken by the pastor. Below is an example:

It is truly good, right and salutary that we should at all times and in all places give thanks to you, holy Lord, almighty Father, everlasting, who in the multitude of your saints did surround us with so great a cloud of witnesses that we, rejoicing in their fellowship, may run with patience the race that is set before us and, together with them, may receive the crown of glory that does not fade away. Therefore with angels and archangels and with all the company of heaven we laud and magnify your glorious name, evermore praising you and saying:

This is followed by the Sanctus, which is sung by the congregation.

Holy, holy, holy Lord,

God of hosts.

Heaven and earth are full of your glory.

Hosanna in the highest.

Blessed is he who comes in the name of the Lord.

Hosanna in the highest.

Next, the first part of the Eucharistic Prayer is spoken by the pastor.

Pastor: You are indeed holy, almighty and merciful God; you are most holy, and great is the majesty of your glory. You so loved the world that you gave your only Son, that whoever believes in him may not perish but have eternal life. Having come into the world, he fulfilled for us your holy will and accomplished our salvation.

The pastor then says the Words of Institution. The pastor may also elevate the elements as well as genuflect.

Our Lord Jesus Christ, on the night when He was betrayed, took bread, and when he had given thanks, he broke it and gave it to his disciples and said, 'Take; eat; this is my body, given for you. This do in remembrance of me.' In the same way, also, He took the cup after supper, and when He had given thanks, He gave it to them saying, 'Drink of it all of you. This cup is the New Testament in My Blood, shed for you for the forgiveness of sins. This do as often as you drink it, in remembrance of Me.'

The Eucharistic Prayer continues, along with the Memorial Acclamation.

Remembering, therefore, his salutary command, his life-giving Passion and death, his glorious resurrection and ascension, and his promise to come again, we give thanks to you, Lord God Almighty, not as we ought, but as we are able; and we implore you mercifully to accept our praise and thanksgiving, and, with your Word and Holy Spirit, to bless us, your servants, and these your own gifts of bread and wine; that we and all who share in the + body and blood of your Son may be filled with heavenly peace and joy, and receiving the forgiveness of sin, may be + sanctified in soul and body, and have our portion will all your saints.

People: Amen.

Pastor: The mystery of faith.

People: When we eat this Bread and drink this Cup, we proclaim your Death, O Lord, until you come again.

Pastor: O Lord Jesus Christ, only Son of the Father, in giving us Your body and blood to eat and to drink, You lead us to remember and confess Your holy cross and passion, Your blessed death, Your rest in the tomb, Your resurrection from the dead, Your ascension into heaven, and the promise of Your coming again.

The Lord's Prayer

Pastor: Lord, remember us in Your kingdom and teach us to pray: People: Our Father, who art in heaven, hallowed be thy name, thy kingdom come, thy will be done on earth as it is in heaven. Give us this day our daily bread; and forgive us our trespasses as we forgive those who trespass against us; and lead us not into temptation, but deliver us from evil. For the kingdom and the power and the glory are yours now and forever. Amen.

The "Peace" or "pax"

Pastor: The peace of the Lord be with you always.

People: And with your spirit. (or "And also with you.")

Pastor: Let us offer each other a sign of peace. (the peace of Christ is shared among the people)

Following this, the Agnus Dei is chanted.

Lamb of God, you take away the sin of the world, have mercy upon us.

Lamb of God, you take away the sin of the world, have mercy upon us.

Lamb of God, you take away the sin of the world, grant us peace. Amen.

Typical Eucharist in a LCMS church

The Distribution is next (see above for different manners), it is followed by the nunc dimittis, which is chanted as follows:

Lord, now you let your servant depart in peace,

according to your word.

For my eyes have seen your salvation,

which you have prepared before the face of all people,

a light to lighten the Gentiles

and the glory of your people Israel.

The postcommunion is prayed by the pastor.

We give thanks to You, almighty God, that You have refreshed us through this salutary gift, and we implore You that of Your mercy You would strengthen us through the same in faith toward You and in fervent love toward one another; through Jesus Christ, Your Son, our Lord, who lives and reigns with You and the Holy spirit, one God, now and forever. Amen.

Finally the Benedicamus Domino and benediction are spoken or chanted by the pastor and congregation with the optional Sign of the Cross being made at the end.

Pastor: The Lord be with you.

People: And also with you.

Pastor: Let us bless the Lord.

People: Thanks be to God.

Pastor: The Lord bless you and keep you; the Lord make his face to shine upon you and be gracious to you; the Lord look upon you with favor and give you + peace.

=== Music ===
Communion is often accompanied by music. Most Lutheran hymnals have a section of communion hymns or hymns appropriate for the celebration of the Lord's Supper. Some of these hymns, such as I Come, O Savior, to Thy Table, Thy Table I Approach, and Schmücke dich, o liebe Seele (an English language translation of which is Soul, Adorn Yourself with Gladness), follow a Eucharistic theme throughout, whilst others such as Wide Open Stand the Gates are sung in preparation or during distribution of the sanctified elements. Chorale preludes on their themes are traditionally played during communion (sub communione).

== Adoration and the Corpus Christi ==
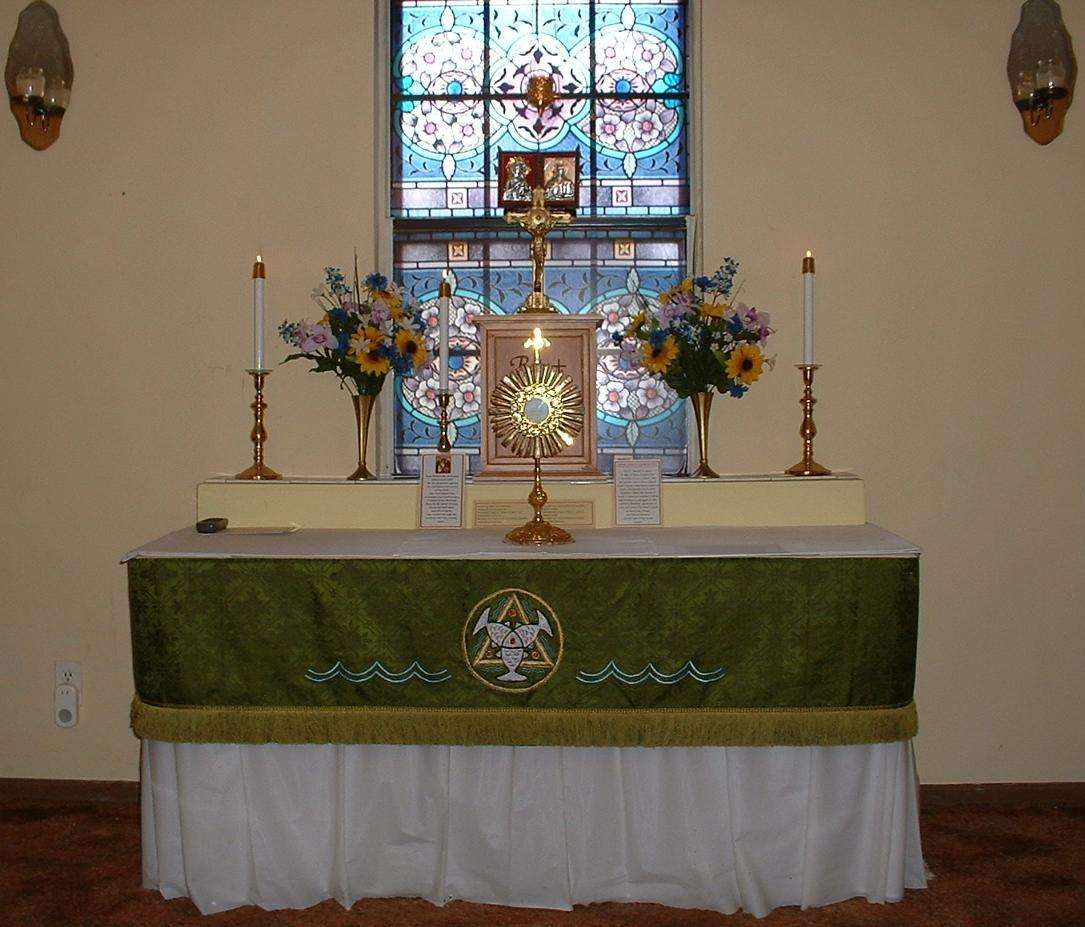
Perpetual Adoration at a High Lutheran congregation, of the Anglo-Lutheran Catholic Church, in Kansas City, Missouri

Lutheran Eucharistic adoration is not commonly practiced, but when it occurs it is done only from the moment of consecration to reception. Many people kneel when they practice this adoration. The consecrated elements are treated with much respect and in many areas are reserved as in Eastern Orthodox and Roman Catholic practice. The Feast of the Corpus Christi was retained in the main calendar of the Lutheran Church up until about 1600, but continues to be celebrated by some Lutheran congregations. On this feast day the consecrated host is displayed on an altar in a monstrance and, in some churches, the rites of the Benediction of the Blessed Sacrament and other forms of adoration are celebrated.

== See also ==
- Eucharistic theology
- Lutheran sacraments
