= Luther's Small Catechism =

Catechism by Martin Luther

Der Kleine Katechismus
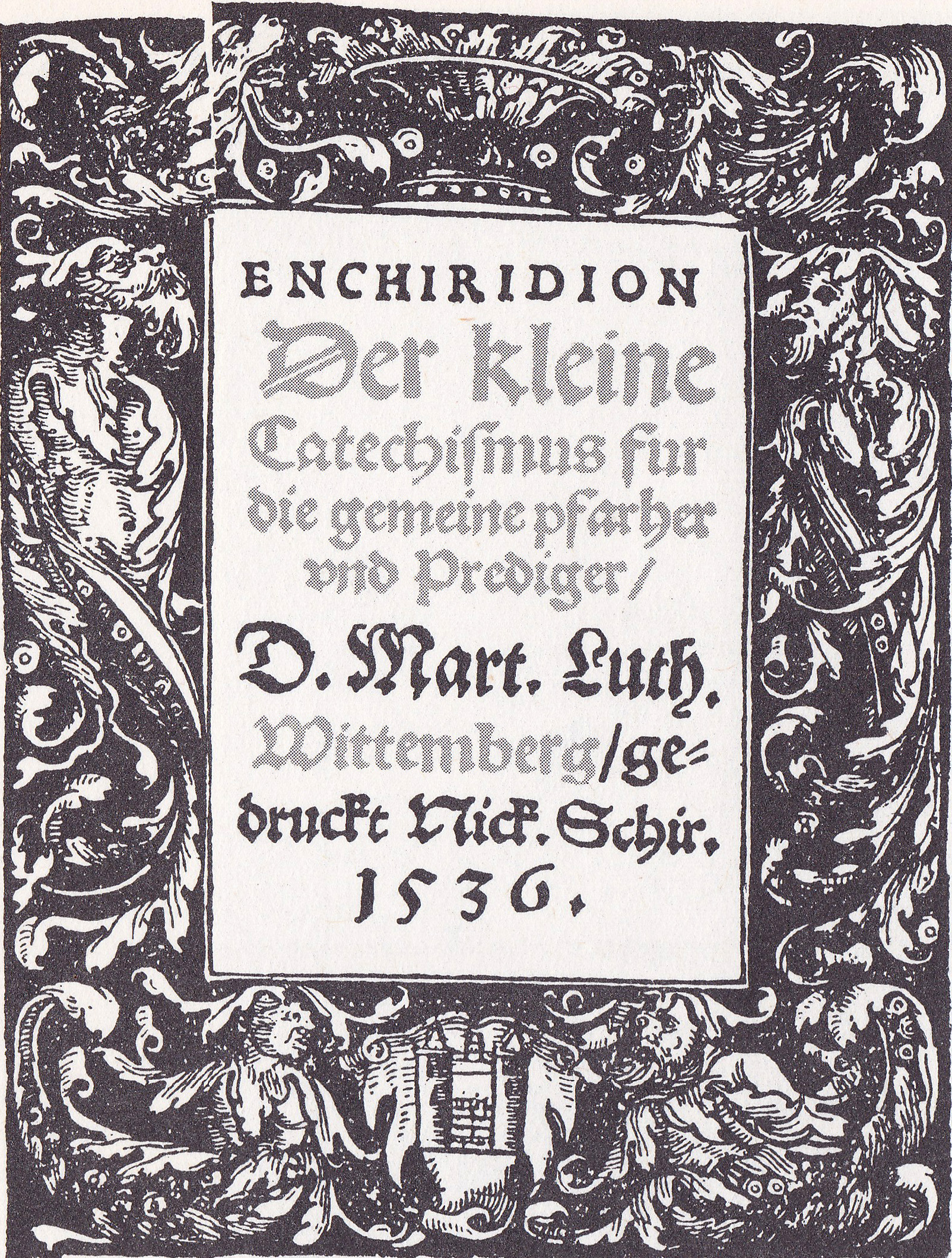
- Title page of Luther's Small Catechism (1536, originally published in 1529)
- Original title: Der Kleine Catechismus
- Language: German
- Publication date: 1529
- Text: Der Kleine Katechismus at Wikisource

Luther's Small Catechism (German: Der Kleine Katechismus) is a catechism written by Martin Luther and published in 1529. In the preface, Luther stated that the purpose of the book was to provide pastors with a teaching aid and to offer fathers a foundation for instructing their family members (which at that time also included servants) in the Christian faith.

The Small Catechism is widely used today in Lutheran churches as part of youth education and Confirmation. It was mandatory for confirmands in the Church of Sweden until the 1960s. It has been translated into most European languages.

== See also ==
- Luther's Large Catechism
