= Pearly Gates (disambiguation) =

The pearly gates are a conceptual entry to Heaven in Christianity.

Pearly Gates may also refer to:

- Pearly Gates (album), a 1999 album by Jughead's Revenge
- Pearly Gates (guitar), a 1959 Gibson Les Paul owned by Billy Gibbons
- Pearly Gates (singer), an American soul singer and member of the Flirtations
- "Pearly Gates" (song), a 2010 song by Pitbull
- "Pearly Gates", a song by Iron Butterfly from Scorching Beauty
- "Pearly Gates", a song by Silkworm from Blueblood
- "Pearly Gates", a song by Prefab Sprout from Protest Songs
- Pearly Gates, a character in the 1963 film The Wrong Arm of the Law
- Pearly Gates (film), an American stage musical and film by Scott Ehrlich

== See also ==
- Pearly Gatecrashers, an Australian band
- Gates of Heaven (disambiguation)
- Heaven's Door (disambiguation)
