= Confession of Peter =

Episode in the New Testament in which the Apostle Peter proclaims Jesus to be the Christ

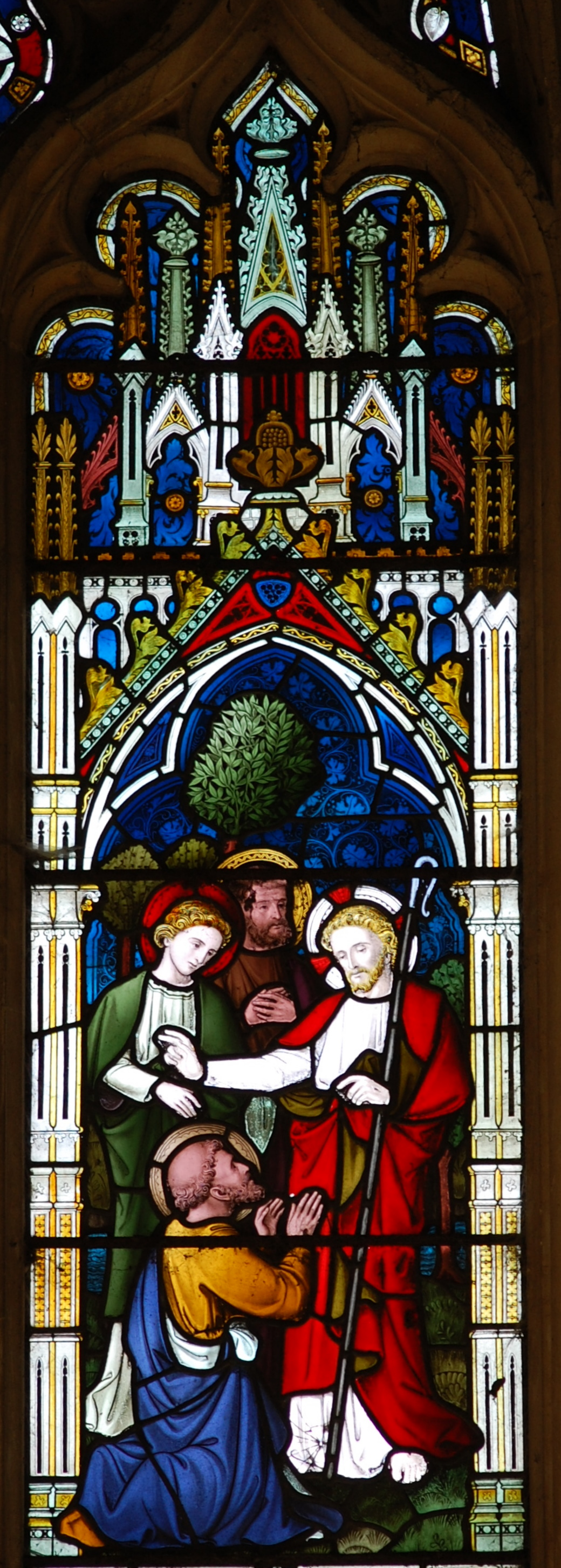
Stained glass window of the Confession of Peter in Luke 9:20: "But who do you say that I am?" Peter answered: "The Christ of God".

In Christianity, the Confession of Peter (translated from the Matthean Vulgate Latin section title: Confessio Petri) refers to an episode in the New Testament in which the Apostle Peter proclaims Jesus to be the Christ (Jewish Messiah). The proclamation is described in the three Synoptic Gospels: Matthew 16:13–20, Mark 8:27–30 and Luke 9:18–21. Depending on which gospel one reads, Peter either says: 'You are the Messiah' or 'the Christ' (Mark 8:29); or 'You are the Messiah, the Son of the living God', (Matthew 16:16), or 'God's Messiah' or 'The Christ of God' (Luke 9:20).

The proclamation of Jesus as Christ is fundamental to Christology; the Confession of Peter and Jesus' acceptance of the title "Messiah" form a definitive statement in the New Testament narrative regarding the person of Jesus Christ. In this New Testament narrative, Jesus not only accepts the titles Christ and Son of God, but declares the proclamation a divine revelation by stating that his Father in Heaven had revealed it to Peter, unequivocally declaring himself to be both Christ and the Son of God.

In the same passage Jesus also selects Peter as the leader of the Apostles, and states: "Upon this rock I will build my church." Most Christian denominations agree that the statement applies to Peter, but they diverge on their interpretations of what happens after Peter.

The Confession of Peter is also the name of a liturgical feastday celebrated by several Christian churches, often as part of the Week of Prayer for Christian Unity.

== Gospel accounts ==
=== Narrative comparison ===
The following comparison table is primarily based on the New International Version (NIV) English translation of the New Testament.

Passage	Matthew	Mark	Luke
What people say	Matthew 16:13–14: When Jesus came to the region of Caesarea Philippi, he asked his disciples: 'Who do people say the Son of Man is?'; They replied: 'Some say John the Baptist; others say Elijah; and still others, Jeremiah or one of the prophets.'	Mark 8:27–28: Jesus and his disciples went on to the villages around Caesarea Philippi. On the way he asked them: 'Who do people say I am?'; They replied: 'Some say John the Baptist; others say Elijah; and still others, one of the prophets.'	Luke 9:18–19: Once when Jesus was praying in private and his disciples were with him, he asked them: 'Who do the crowds say I am?'; They replied: 'Some say John the Baptist; others say Elijah; and still others, that one of the prophets of long ago has come back to life.'
What the disciples say	Matthew 16:15–16: 'But what about you?' he asked. 'Who do you say I am?'; Simon Peter answered: 'You are the Messiah, the Son of the living God.'	Mark 8:29: 'But what about you?' he asked. 'Who do you say I am?'; Peter answered: 'You are the Messiah.'	Luke 9:20: 'But what about you?' he asked. 'Who do you say I am?'; Peter answered: 'God's Messiah.'
Jesus selects Peter	Matthew 16:17–19: Jesus replied: 'Blessed are you, Simon son of Jonah, for this was not revealed to you by flesh and blood, but by my Father in heaven. And I tell you that you are Peter, and on this rock I will build my church, and the gates of Hades will not overcome it. I will give you the keys of the kingdom of heaven; whatever you bind on earth will be bound in heaven, and whatever you loose on earth will be loosed in heaven.'		
Jesus silences the disciples	Matthew 16:20: Then he ordered his disciples not to tell anyone that he was the Messiah.	Mark 8:30: Jesus warned them not to tell anyone about him.	Luke 9:21: Jesus strictly warned them not to tell this to anyone.

=== Background and setting ===
In the New Testament, this pericope and the account of the Transfiguration of Jesus which follows it appear towards the middle of the Gospel narrative and jointly mark the beginnings of the gradual disclosure of the identity of Jesus to his disciples.

In Matthew and Mark, the setting is near Caesarea Philippi, northeast of the Sea of Galilee and within the Tetrarchy of Philip, and is at the beginning of the final journey to Jerusalem which ends in the Crucifixion and Resurrection of Jesus. Luke does not mention the location.

Peter's Confession begins as a dialogue between Jesus and his disciples in Matthew 16:13, Mark 8:27 and Luke 9:18. Jesus begins to ask about the current opinions about himself among "the multitudes", asking: "Who do the multitudes say that I am?" The disciples provide a variety of the common hypotheses at the time, ranging from John the Baptist to Elijah, Jeremiah, or one of the (other) prophets. The Cambridge Bible for Schools and Colleges, following Jewish medieval rabbi David Kimhi and theologican John Lightfoot, suggests that Jeremiah "is mentioned as a representative of the Prophets, because in the Jewish Canon the book of Jeremiah came first of the Prophets, following the books of Kings."

Earlier in the Gospel narrative, these hypotheses about Jesus' identity were provided in Mark 6:14-16 by those in the court of Herod Antipas when he wondered if Jesus was John the Baptist restored to life.

=== Proclamation and acceptance ===
In the three Gospel accounts, after asking about the views of "the multitudes", Jesus asks his disciples about their own opinion: "But who do you say that I am?" Only Simon Peter answers him: "You are the Christ, the Son of the living God".

Only in Matthew 16:17 Jesus blesses Peter for his answer, and later indicates this revelation is the foundational rock of the Church. This begins with:

Blessed art thou, Simon Bar-jonah: for flesh and blood hath not revealed it unto thee, but my Father who is in heaven.

In blessing Peter, Jesus not only accepts the titles Christ and Son of God which Peter attributes to him, but declares the proclamation a divine revelation by stating that his Father in Heaven had revealed it to Peter. In this assertion, by endorsing both titles as divine revelation, Jesus unequivocally declares himself to be both Christ and the Son of God.

The reference to "my Father" is distinguished in that in the New Testament, Jesus never includes other individuals in such references and only refers to his Father, however when addressing the disciples he uses your Father, excluding himself from the reference.

=== Selection of Peter ===
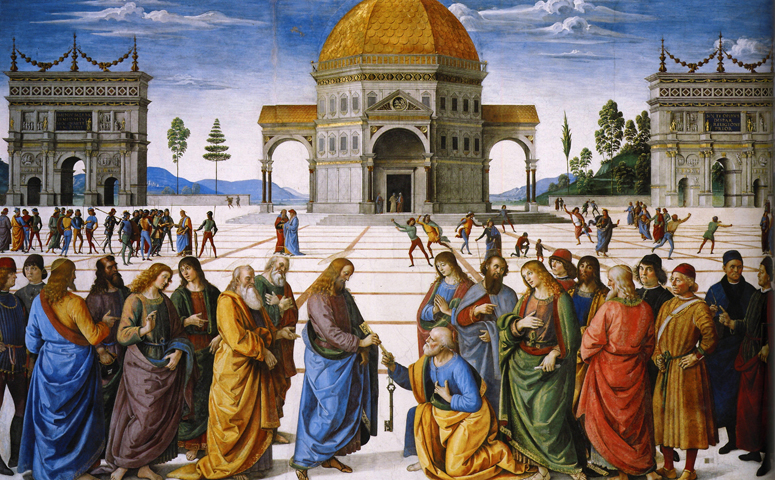
Pietro Perugino's Christ Giving the Keys to St. Peter, c. 1482

In Matthew 16:18 Jesus then continues:

And I say also unto thee, That thou art Peter, and upon this rock I will build my church; and the gates of hell shall not prevail against it. And I will give unto thee the keys of the kingdom of heaven.

The word "Peter" in this verse is, in Greek, "petros", while this "rock" is "petra". It is a play on words, but if the original language was Aramaic the word in both cases is simply "kepha". A distinction that petros meant a stone and petra a solid piece of rocky ground is sometimes suggested, but Greek use in antiquity seems to have been less precise.

The word "church" (ekklesia in Greek), as used here, appears in the Gospels only once more, in Matthew 18:17, and refers to the community of believers at the time. The "gates of hell" (of Hades) refers to the underworld, and the abode of the dead, and refers to the powers opposed to God not being able to triumph over the church. The keys of the kingdom of heaven refer to the metaphor of the Kingdom of Heaven being a "place to be entered" as also used in Matthew 23:13, where the entrance to it can be shut.

Peter's authority is further confirmed by: "Whatsoever thou shalt bind on earth shall be bound in heaven: and whatsoever thou shalt loose on earth shall be loosed in heaven." As discussed below, various Christian denominations have assigned different interpretations to the authority granted in this passage.

=== Jesus silencing the disciples ===
All three of the Synoptic Gospels end the account with Jesus telling the disciples not to reveal that he was the Messiah to anyone—an instance of the motif of the Messianic Secret.

== Denominational responses ==
=== Interpretations ===
Various Christian denominations interpret Matthew 16:18 in different ways. Although most denominations agree that the statement applies to Peter, they diverge on their interpretations of what happens after Peter.

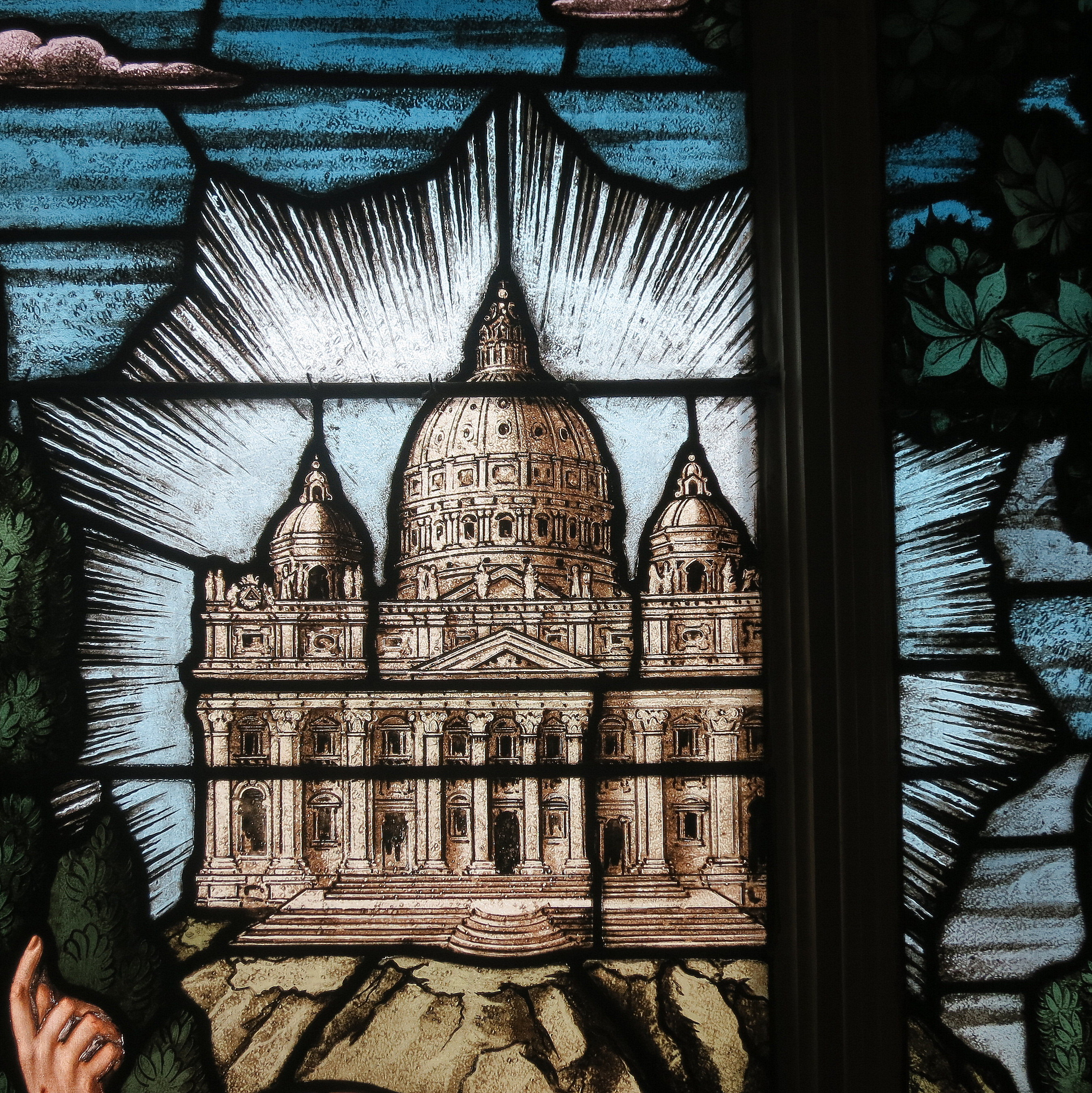
Stained glass window in a Catholic church depicting St. Peter's Basilica in Rome sitting "Upon this rock," a reference to Matthew 16:18. Most present-day Catholics interpret Jesus as saying he was building his church on the rock of the Apostle Peter and the succession of popes which claim Apostolic succession from him.

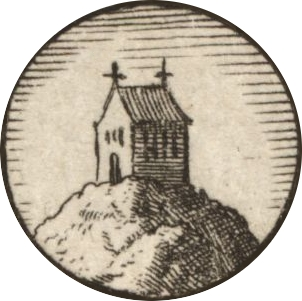
A 17th century illustration of Article VII: Of the Church from the Lutheran Augsburg Confession, which states "...one holy Church is to continue forever. The Church is the congregation of saints, in which the Gospel is rightly taught and the Sacraments are rightly administered." Here the rock from Matthew 16:18 refers to the preaching and ministry of Jesus as the Christ, a view discussed at length in the 1537 Treatise.

In the Roman Catholic Church, Jesus' words "upon this rock I will build my church" are interpreted as the foundation of the doctrine of the papacy, whereby the Church of Christ is founded upon Peter and his successors, the Bishops of Rome. Jesus' next statement, "and the gates of hell shall not prevail against it." are interpreted as the foundation of the doctrine of papal infallibility.

Some Protestants believe that the verse states that Peter was the foundation stone of the Church, but do not accept that it applies to the continuous succession of popes, as the Bishops of Rome. The statement "and the gates of hell shall not prevail against it" is usually taken to mean that the Church will never become extinct. Some Protestant evangelical groups adhere to the interpretation that it is Peter's "confession" itself that is "the rock on which will be built the Church of Jesus", i.e., the church will be built on Jesus alone as the foundation stone of his church. This interpretation usually uses the argument of the difference between petros and petra in Greek ("You are Peter [petros] and on this rock [petra] I will build my church.")

The Eastern Orthodox and Oriental Orthodox churches see Jesus' words "whatsoever thou shalt bind on earth shall be bound in heaven" as bestowing first upon Peter what was later bestowed upon all of the Apostles collectively. The Orthodox believe in the infallibility of the Church as a whole, but that any individual, regardless of their position, can be subject to error.

Anglicans would tend to agree with the Orthodox position that the power of the keys and of binding and loosing is shared by the whole episcopate, though many would be prepared to allow the Bishop of Rome a special place in this collegial office.

Ecumenical meetings among different denominations have taken place regarding these interpretations, but no final agreement has emerged.

=== Commemorations ===
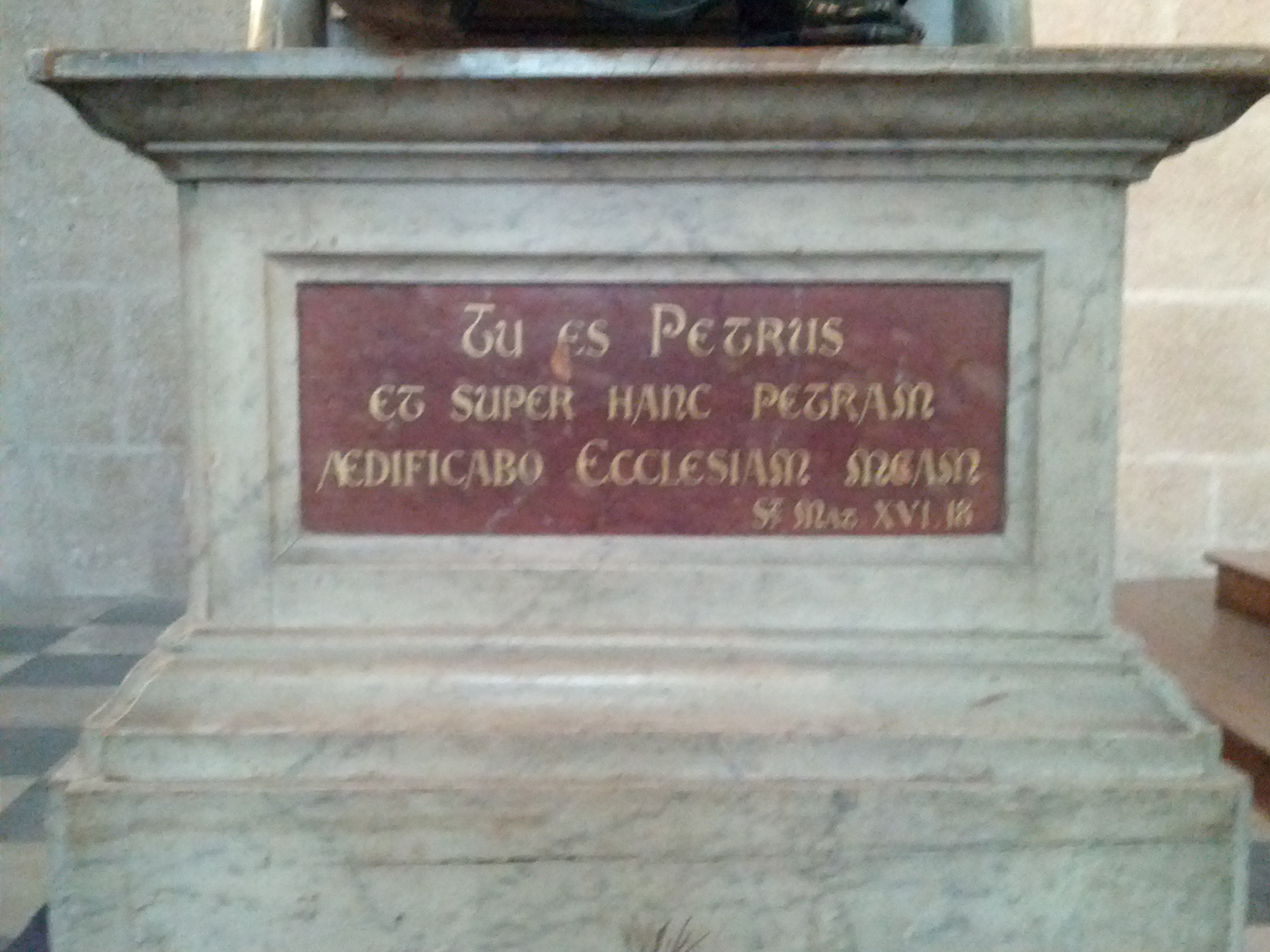
Plaque at Nantes Cathedral: "Thou art Peter, and upon this rock I will build my church", in Latin

The Roman Catholic Church celebrates the Feast of the Chair of St. Peter on 22 February in the General Roman Calendar. In the General Roman Calendar of 1960, the feast is celebrated on 18 January. Some Anglican and Lutheran churches celebrate the Feast of the Confession of St. Peter on 18 January.

The Confession of Peter is the beginning of the Week of Prayer for Christian Unity, actually an octave rather than a week, and was originally known as the Octave of Christian Unity. It is an international Christian ecumenical observance that began in 1908. It spans from 18 January to 25 January (the Feast of the Conversion of Saint Paul).

== See also ==
- Chronology of Jesus
- Denial of Peter
- Life of Jesus in the New Testament
- Transfiguration of Jesus

Confession of Peter Life of Jesus: Ministry
Preceded by Blind Man of Bethsaida; Miracles of Jesus	New Testament; Events	Succeeded by The Transfiguration; Miracles of Jesus
