= Keys of Heaven =

Metaphorical keys of Saint Peter

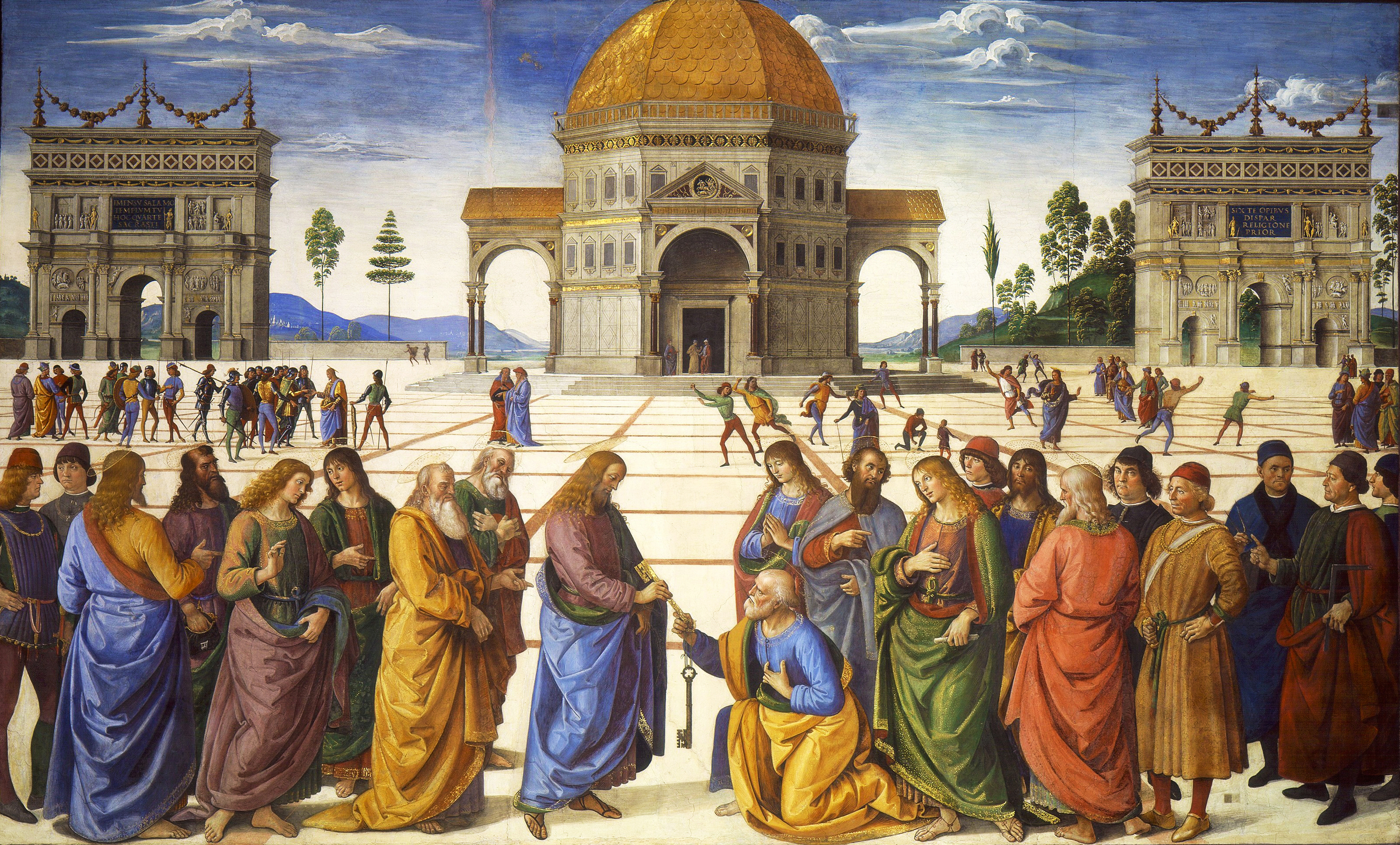
Fresco (c. 1481–1482) by Pietro Perugino depicting Jesus Christ handing the keys of heaven to Saint Peter, symbolizing the grant of spiritual authority.

The emblem of the papacy used by the Catholic Church which depicts the Keys of Heaven.

The Keys of Heaven, also called Saint Peter's keys, refers to the metaphorical keys of the office of Saint Peter, the keys of the Gates of Heaven, or the keys of the kingdom of Heaven. It is explicitly referenced in the Bible in Matthew 16:19.

== Christianity ==
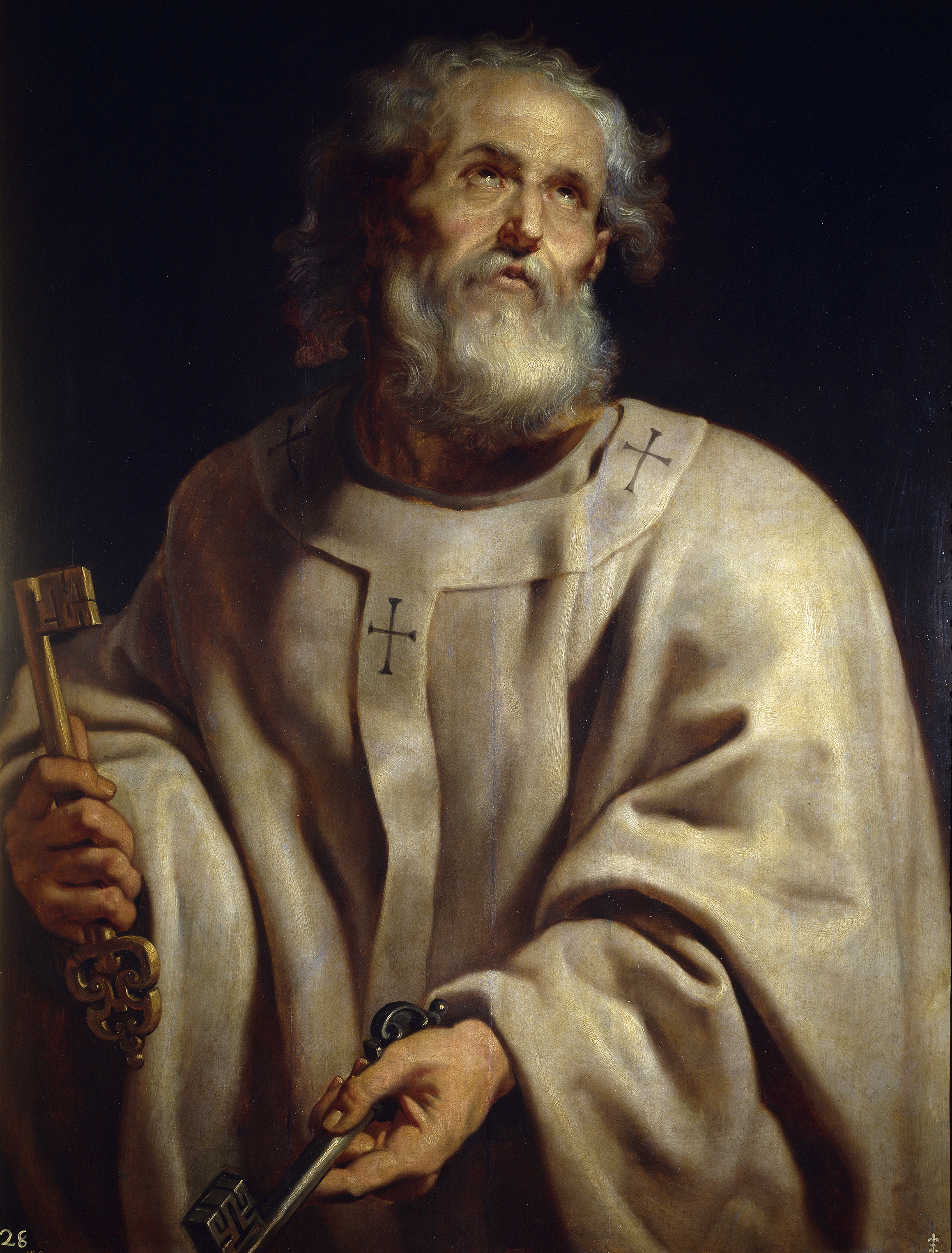
Saint Peter depicted (by Peter Paul Rubens) holding the Keys of Heaven while vested in the pallium – Museo del Prado

According to Catholic teaching, Jesus promised the keys to heaven to Saint Peter, empowering him to take binding actions. In the Gospel of Matthew 16:19, Jesus says to Peter, "I will give you the keys of the kingdom of heaven, and whatever you bind on Earth shall be bound in heaven, and whatever you loose on Earth shall be loosed in heaven." Saint Peter is often depicted in Catholic, Eastern Orthodox, and Oriental Orthodox paintings and other artwork as holding a key or a set of keys.

The keys of heaven or keys of Saint Peter are seen as a symbol of papal authority and are seen on papal coats of arms (those of individual popes) and those of the Holy See and Vatican City State: "Behold he [Peter] received the keys of the kingdom of heaven, the power of binding and loosing is committed to him, the care of the whole Church and its government is given to him".

=== Biblical sources ===
Bible verses associated with Peter and his position of authority include:

- Isaiah 22:20–23;
- Matthew 10:2;
- Matthew 16:18–19;
- Luke 22:32;
- John 21:17;
- Acts 2:14;
- Acts 10:46;
- Galatians 1:18.

Bible verses associated with the transfer of powers from pope to pope include:

- Acts 1:20; 6:6; 13:3; 8:18; 9:17;
- 1 Timothy 4:14; 5:22;
- 2 Timothy 1:6

The emblem of the Patriarch used by the Syriac Orthodox Church.

== Islam ==
In Islam, the concept of the "keys of heaven" is associated with God’s exclusive authority. The Qur'an states that "the keys of the heavens and the earth belong to God alone" (39:63; 42:12), a phrase understood to mean that only God determines entry into Paradise.

In contrast, the Gospel of Matthew (16:19) records Jesus as telling Peter that he holds the "keys of the kingdom of heaven" (Greek: κλεῖδας, kleidas; Syriac: ܩܠܝܕܐ, qleeda), which has traditionally been interpreted within Christianity as conferring authority to the church regarding salvation.

The Qur'an employs the uncommon Arabic term maqālīd (مَقَالِيدُ) for "keys," instead of the more common mafātih. Scholars have noted that this rare usage occurs only in connection with the heavens and the earth, and may serve to emphasize that, in Islam, ultimate authority over salvation rests with God rather than with any human or institution.

== See also ==
- Coat of arms of the Holy See
- Keys of the kingdom
- Papal regalia and insignia
- Power of the Keys
- Primacy of Peter
