= The Age of Innocence (disambiguation) =

The Age of Innocence is a 1920 novel by Edith Wharton.

The Age of Innocence may also refer to:

== Film, stage and television ==
- Adaptations of Wharton's novel:
  - The Age of Innocence (1924 film), an American silent film directed by Wesley Ruggles
  - The Age of Innocence (play), a 1928 American Broadway play by Margaret Ayer Barnes
  - The Age of Innocence (1934 film), an American film directed by Philip Moeller
  - The Age of Innocence (1993 film), an American film directed by Martin Scorsese
  - The Age of Innocence (TV series), an upcoming television series produced for Netflix

Other films:

- The Age of Innocence (1976 film), a Soviet film directed by Vladimir Rogovoy; also called Minors; Russian: Несовершеннолетние
- Age of Innocence (1977 film), a Canadian film directed by Alan Bridges; also called Ragtime Summer

== Music ==
- The Age of Innocence (album), by Jolin Tsai, 2003
- Age of Innocence, an EP, or its title song, by the Pearly Gatecrashers, 1992
- "The Age of Innocence", a song by Lala Hsu from The Inner Me, 2017
- "Age of Innocence", a song by Elephante, 2016
- "Age of Innocence", a song by Iron Maiden from Dance of Death, 2003
- "Age of Innocence", a song by Smashing Pumpkins from Machina/The Machines of God, 2000

== Other uses ==
- The Age of Innocence (Hamilton book), a 1995 photo-book by David Hamilton
- The Age of Innocence (painting), a 1785/1788 oil by Joshua Reynolds
- Age of Innocence (TV series), a 2002 South Korean drama
- "Age of Innocence" (Mutant X), a 2004 television episode
- The Age of Innocence, a 2024 stage play commissioned and premiered by the Old Globe Theatre
