= Power of the Keys =

Responsibility given to St. Peter

The Power of the Keys, also known as the Office of the Keys, is a responsibility given to St. Peter to usher in the Kingdom of God on the Day of Pentecost, and a responsibility given to the other apostles by Jesus, according to Matthew 16:19 and Matthew 18:18. It is understood as a responsibility to admit or exclude from church membership (excommunicate), to set church policy and teachings (dogma), to render binding interpretations of Sacred Scripture (ancient rabbis were known to make binding interpretations of the Mosaic law), and to bind and loose sins. The verb 'to loose' (or to free) is used this way in John 20:23, Revelation 1:5 and by the Early Church Fathers.

In Christianity, "the keys are an office and power given by Christ to the Church for binding and loosing sins." It is a power that Roman Catholics believe to have been conferred first on St. Peter then afterwards on his successors in the office of the Roman Catholic Papacy. There is a description of the conferral of the Power of the Keys on St. Peter (originally named Simon) in Matthew 16:13:

13 Now when Jesus came into the district of Caesarea Philippi, he asked his disciples, "Who do people say that the Son of Man is?" 14 And they said, "Some say John the Baptist, others say Elijah, and others Jeremiah or one of the prophets." 15 He said to them, "But who do you say that I am?" 16 Simon Peter replied, "You are the Christ, the Son of the living God." 17 And Jesus answered him, "Blessed are you, Simon Bar-Jonah! For flesh and blood has not revealed this to you, but my Father who is in heaven. 18 And I tell you, you are Peter, and on this rock I will build my church, and the gates of hell shall not prevail against it. 19 I will give you the keys of the kingdom of heaven, and whatever you bind on earth shall be bound in heaven, and whatever you loose on earth shall be loosed in heaven." – Matthew 16:13–19

In Matthew chapter 18, 18 through 20, we see Jesus speaking to the disciples, not an individual specifically. This points to Jesus continuing to instruct the disciples in chapter 16, and perhaps not Peter individually after blessing Peter for having confessed who Jesus was by God's allowance;

18 Truly, I say to you, whatever you bind on earth shall be bound in heaven, and whatever you loose on earth shall be loosed in heaven. 19 Again I say to you, if two of you agree on earth about anything they ask, it will be done for them by my Father in heaven. 20 For where two or three are gathered in my name, there am I among them.” – Matthew 18:18–20

This point of view is furthered (the collective authority / power of the keys) in the first Council of Jerusalem.

Roman Catholic dogma states that in Matthew 16, Jesus was paraphrasing a passage from Isaiah well known among the Jews (Is 22:15-25) in which Hezekiah, the King of Israel, had a general cabinet of ministers and his chief chamberlain, the Prime Minister Shebna was proved unworthy of his post and was thrown out. To fill his office, King Hezekiah names Eliakim son of Hilkiah as the new prime minister:

15 Thus says the Lord God of hosts, “Come, go to this steward, to Shebna, who is over the household, and say to him: 16 What have you to do here, and whom have you here, that you have cut out here a tomb for yourself, you who cut out a tomb on the height and carve a dwelling for yourself in the rock? 17 Behold, the Lord will hurl you away violently, O you strong man. He will seize firm hold on you 18 and whirl you around and around, and throw you like a ball into a wide land. There you shall die, and there shall be your glorious chariots, you shame of your master's house. 19 I will thrust you from your office, and you will be pulled down from your station. 20 In that day I will call my servant Eliakim the son of Hilkiah, 21 and I will clothe him with your robe, and will bind your sash on him, and will commit your authority to his hand. And he shall be a father to the inhabitants of Jerusalem and to the house of Judah. 22 And I will place on his shoulder the key of the house of David. He shall open, and none shall shut; and he shall shut, and none shall open. 23 And I will fasten him like a peg in a secure place, and he will become a throne of honor to his father's house. – Isaiah 22:15–23

In the Bible, the term keys has been used as a symbol of teaching authority (Lk 11:52). According to Roman Catholics, Jesus, the son of David and hence the King of the new Davidic kingdom, the Church, appoints St. Peter as the Church's primary teacher, an office that will continue to have successors much like Eliakim's position in the Old Testament Davidic kingdom. With these keys, like Eliakim, St. Peter the first Bishop of Rome and his successors are entrusted with Christ's own teaching authority over the new House of David, the Church here on earth (Rev. 1:18, 3:7). Through this office of the Papacy and the Magisterium, Roman Catholics believe that the Kingdom of Heaven governs the Church on earth to lead it to all truth in matters of faith and morals (1 Tim 3:15, Mt 28:20, Jn 16:13). The Vatican's own claims to the Keys as a heraldic statement are limited to the 14th century.

Many Christians point out that Jesus uses much the same language in John 20:23 and therefore conferred some or all of the same powers on all the Apostles. On this basis, Eastern Orthodox believe that the power of the keys is conferred on all bishops. Similarly, Martin Luther and other reformers spoke of the "office of the Keys" as the power of church leaders to admit or exclude from church membership. In the Lutheran churches, the "Office of the Keys is the special authority which Christ has given to His Church on earth: to forgive the sins of the penitent sinners, but to retain the sins of the impenitent as long as they do not repent." Lutheran doctrine cites John 20:22–23 as the basis for the sacrament of Confession and Absolution.

The Methodist tradition holds that the office of the keys is exercised when the Church baptizes an individual and pronounces him/her saved. The office of the keys is furthermore exercised in the Church "binding and loosing", being able to excommunicate individuals from the sacraments as "ordinarily, no one is saved outside the visible church".

== See also ==
- Keys of the kingdom
- Keys of Heaven
