= Heaven's Gate =

Heaven's Gate, a phrase made familiar from William Shakespeare's Sonnet 29, which begins "When in disgrace with fortune and men's eyes", may refer to:

- Heaven's Gate (religious group), mostly known for a mass suicide in 1997
  - Heaven's Gate (podcast), 2017 podcast by Pineapple Street Media about the religious group
- Heaven's Gate (film), a 1980 American film directed by Michael Cimino
- Heavens Gate (band), a German heavy metal band
- Heaven's Gate (album), a 2007 album by Norwegian symphonic power metal band Keldian
- Heaven's Gate (video game), a 3D fighting game
- Heaven's Gate, an unofficial live album by the band UFO from 1995
- "Heaven's Gate", a song by Zion I from Break a Dawn
- "Heaven's Gate", a song by Burna Boy from Outside
- The pearly gates, informal name for the gateway to Heaven in Christian beliefs
- Tianmen Cave, a very large, natural hole near the top of Tianmen Mountain in Hunan, China
- Heaven's Gate, an album and single by American artist Nero's Day at Disneyland

== See also ==
- "The Worms at Heaven's Gate", a poem by Wallace Stevens
- Gates of Heaven (disambiguation)
