= Gates of Heaven (disambiguation) =

Gates of Heaven is a 1978 documentary film by Errol Morris.

Gates of Heaven may also refer to:

- Gates of Heaven (album), a 2003 album by Do As Infinity
- The Gates of Heaven, a 1945 Italian film directed by Vittorio De Sica
- Gates of Heaven Synagogue, Madison, Wisconsin
- The pearly gates

== See also ==
- Heaven's Gate (disambiguation)
- Gate of Heaven Cemetery (disambiguation)
- Porta Coeli (disambiguation)
