= Matthew 16:19 =

- ← 16:18 16:20 →
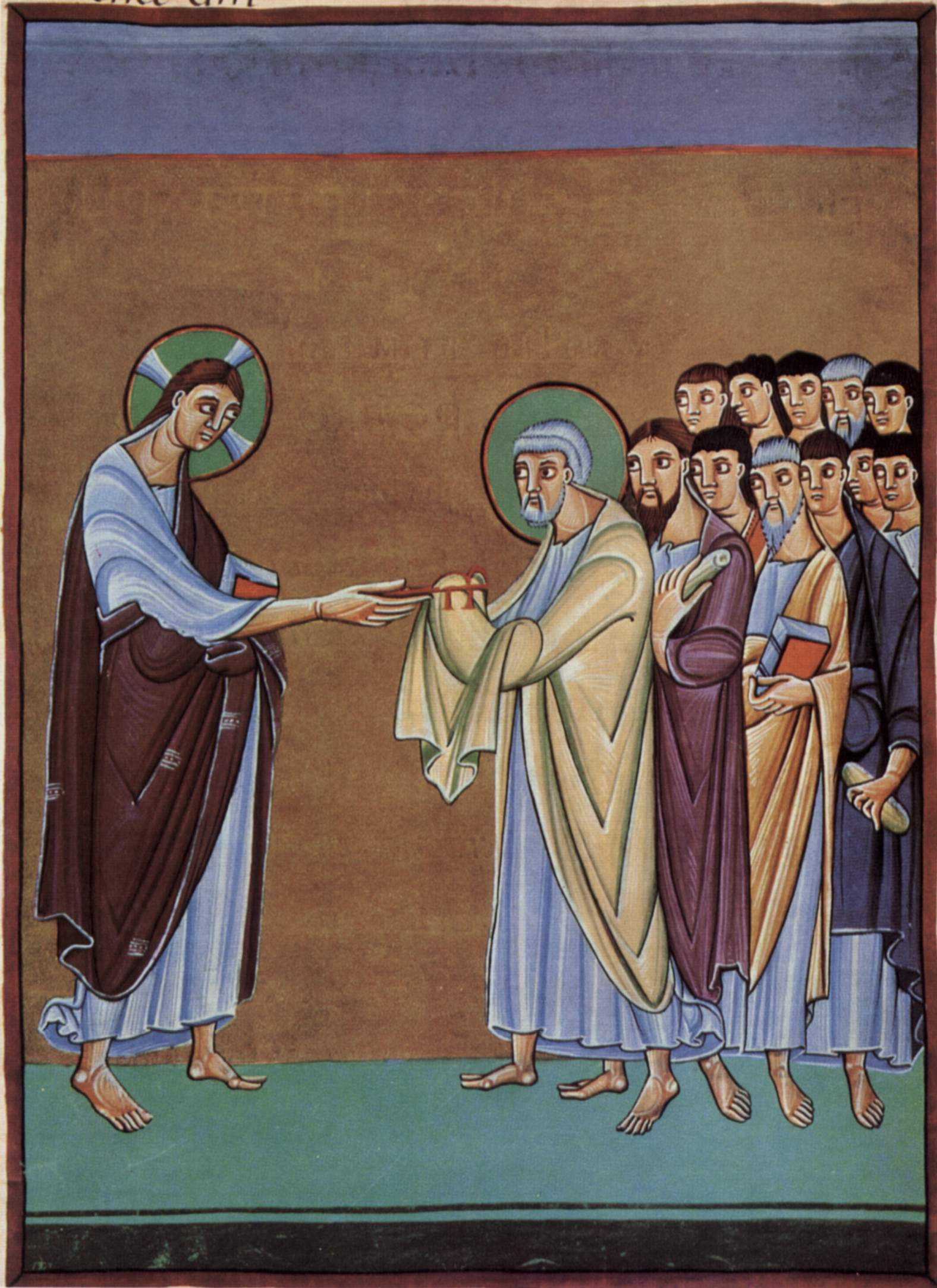
- The depiction of the commission to Peter from the Pericopes of Henry II, an 11th-century illuminated manuscript from the Holy Roman Empire
- Book: Gospel of Matthew
- Christian Bible part: New Testament

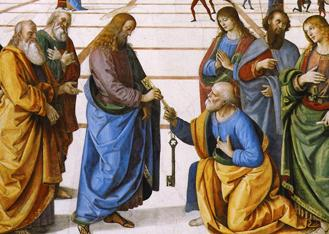
Jesus presents the Keys of the kingdom to Saint Peter (detail from a painting by Pietro Perugino, 1481/82)

Matthew 16:19 is the nineteenth verse in the sixteenth chapter of the Gospel of Matthew in the New Testament of the Christian Bible. It records the words spoken by Jesus to Simon Peter. It is from this passage that Saint Peter is often said to be the gatekeeper of heaven.

== Content ==
In Koine Greek it reads

δώσω σοι τὰς κλεῖδας τῆς βασιλείας τῶν οὐρανῶν, καὶ ὃ ἐὰν δήσῃς ἐπὶ τῆς γῆς ἔσται δεδεμένον ἐν τοῖς οὐρανοῖς, καὶ ὃ ἐὰν λύσῃς ἐπὶ τῆς γῆς ἔσται λελυμένον ἐν τοῖς οὐρανοῖς.
Dōsō soi tas kleidas tēs Basileias tōn Ouranōn, kai ho ean dēsēs epi tēs Gēs estai dedemenon en tois Ouranois, kai ho ean lysēs epi tēs Gēs estai lelymenon en tois Ouranois.

The exact translation varies slightly depending on the version of the Bible, but it is generally translated into English as:

"I will give you the keys of the kingdom of heaven; whatever you bind on earth will be bound in heaven, and whatever you loose on earth will be loosed in heaven."

For a collection of other versions see BibleHub Matthew 16:19

== Analysis ==
The Keys of the kingdom and the Kingdom of Heaven are popular Christian concepts and are quite significant in multiple denominations. While the "Kingdom of Heaven" is referenced elsewhere in the Bible, the "Keys of the Kingdom" is only referenced in this passage. "Keys" symbolize "authority" (cf. Isaiah 22:22: "key of the house of David".

The keys of the kingdom is given to Peter, which is explicated to mean that Peter has the authority to bind and loose (cf. Matthew 18:18). This is not to be understood as a statement about exorcism or the forgiveness of sins (cf. John 20:23), but Peter, being a sort of 'supreme rabbi of the kingdom', is given teaching authority, that 'his decisions stand'.

The verbs in future perfect tense—'will have been bound', 'will have been loosed'—suggest that 'the heavenly decision preceded Peter's declaration of it on earth'. "Bind" and "loose" are judicial terms denoting "forbid" and "permit". This expression is to contrast Peter's authority in teaching with that of the Pharisees and the scribes (cf. Matthew 23:13). In Matthew 18:18 the same authority is given to all of his disciples.

== Cultural references ==
This is a very popular line from the Bible and is referenced in many different forms.

=== Books ===
- The adventure-fantasy novel The Keys to the Kingdom
- The 1941 novel The Keys of the Kingdom
- Dostoevsky's character Ivan references this passage in The Brothers Karamazov while relating a tale about The Inquisition

=== Music ===
- Keys of the Kingdom - Moody Blues album
- The Key to the Kingdom (Praga Khan song)
- The songs "Girl in the War" and "Thin Blue Flame" from Josh Ritter's album The Animal Years
- The song "Don't Be Sad" by the band Whiskeytown
- The song "Kingdom of Heaven" by the 13th Floor Elevators
- The song "Kingdom of Heaven" by Epica (band)
- The song "Avalanche" by Matthew Good

=== Film ===
- The Keys of the Kingdom (film)
- Kingdom of Heaven (film), a 2005 film directed by Ridley Scott
- Dogma (film), a 1999 American fantasy comedy film written and directed by Kevin Smith

=== Other ===
- The Key to the Kingdom - Japanese manga series
- Kingdom of Heaven, the name of a communal religious group led by William W. Davies near Walla Walla, Washington from 1867 to 1881

== See also ==
- John 1:42
- Primacy of Peter

== Sources ==
- Allison, Dale C. Jr. (2007). "57. Matthew". In Barton, John; Muddiman, John (eds.). The Oxford Bible Commentary (first (paperback) ed.). Oxford University Press. pp. 844–886. ISBN 978-0199277186.
- Coogan, Michael David (2007). Coogan, Michael David; Brettler, Marc Zvi; Newsom, Carol Ann; Perkins, Pheme (eds.). The New Oxford Annotated Bible with the Apocryphal/Deuterocanonical Books: New Revised Standard Version, Issue 48 (Augmented 3rd ed.). Oxford University Press. ISBN 9780195288810.
- France, R. T. (1994). "Matthew". In Carson, D. A.; France, R. T.; Motyer, J. A.; Wenham, G. J. (eds.). New Bible Commentary: 21st Century Edition (4, illustrated, reprint, revised ed.). Inter-Varsity Press. pp. 904–945. ISBN 9780851106489.
