= Heaven's Door =

Heaven's Door may refer to:

- Pearly gates, the door to heaven
- Heaven's Door (2009 film), a Japanese drama film
- Heaven's Door (2013 film), an American spiritual drama film
- "Heaven's Door" (song), a 2010 song by Beni
- "Heaven's Door", a 2009 song by Alicia Keys from The Element of Freedom
- Himmels-Tür (Heaven's Door), a composition by Karlheinz Stockhausen, part of the Klang cycle
