= Primacy of Peter =

Position of preeminence attributed to Peter

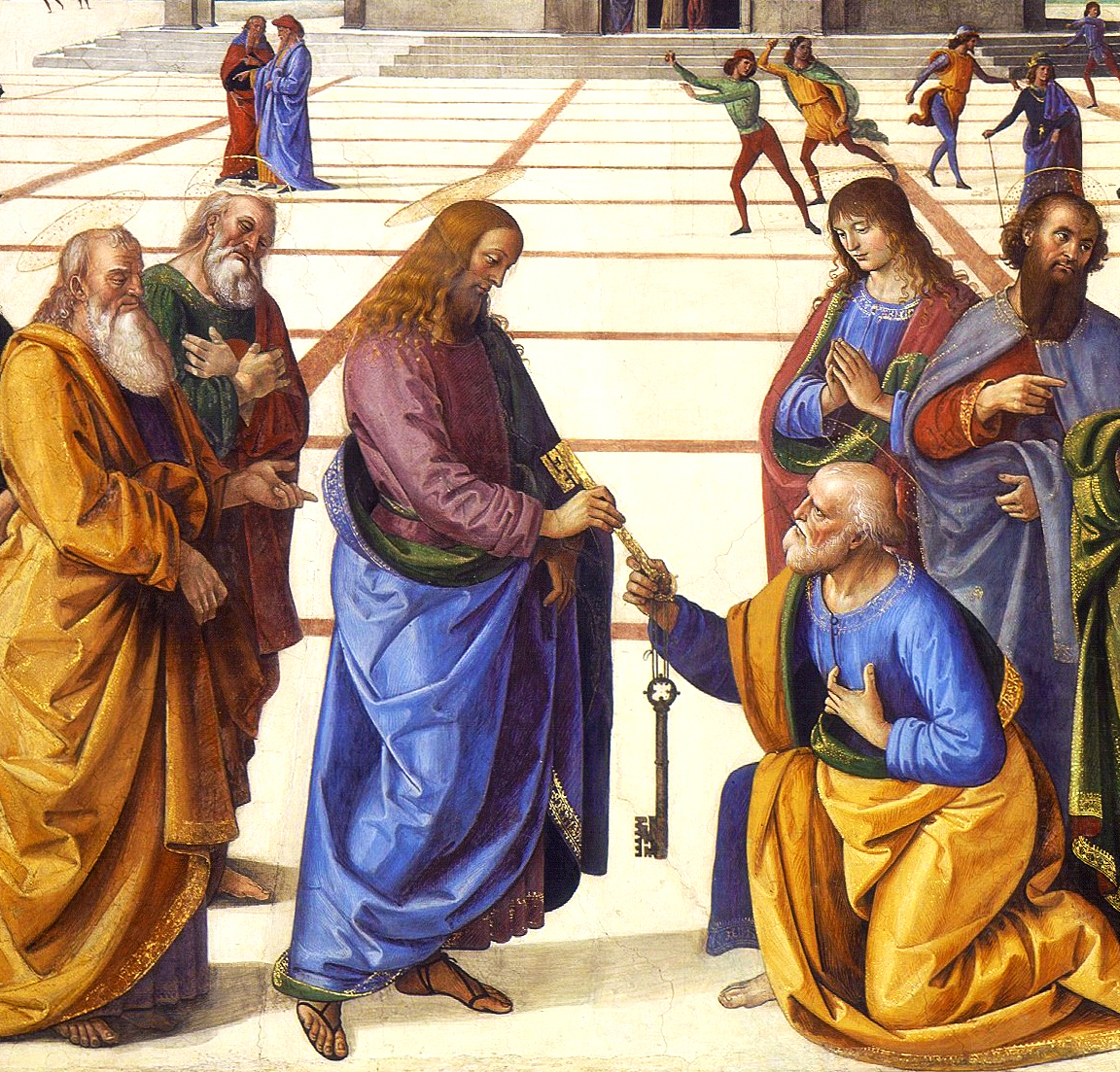
An imaginative depiction of "Christ handing the Keys of Heaven to the Apostle Peter" as written in Matthew 16:18, by Pietro Perugino (1481–82)

The primacy of Peter, also known as Petrine primacy (from the Latin: Petrus, lit. 'Peter'), is the position of preeminence that is attributed to Peter among the Twelve Apostles of Christianity.

== Primacy of Peter among the Apostles ==
The Evangelical Dictionary of Theology illustrates the leading role that Peter played among the Apostles, speaking up on matters that concern them all, being called by Jesus by a name linking him with the rock on which Jesus would build his church, being charged with pastoring the flock of Christ, and taking the leading role in the initial church.

There is general agreement among scholars on the preeminence that the historical Peter held among the disciples of Jesus, making him "the most prominent and influential member of the Twelve during Jesus' ministry and in the early Church".

In one interpretation, the prominence that the New Testament and other early Christian writings attribute to Peter is due to their seeing him as a unifying factor in contrast to other figures identified with disputed interpretations of Christianity.

== Catholic view ==
In Catholicism, it is held that the primacy of Peter is a basis for the primacy of the bishop of Rome over other bishops throughout the Catholic Church. This extension of Petrine primacy to popes is known as the primacy of the Bishop of Rome. This Catholic Church doctrine holds that the pope as Bishop of Rome has authority delegated from Jesus to rule over the entire Church. There are various views on the nature of the primacy and how it has been exercised and passed on. This belief makes a distinction between the personal prestige of Peter and the supremacy of the office of pope which Catholics believe Jesus instituted in the person of Peter.

In the New Testament, which some call the New Law or "New Greek Testament", Matthew 16:16–18 reports that Jesus changed Simon's name to Peter. Elsewhere in Scripture such a name change always denotes some change in status (e.g., Abram to Abraham, or Jacob to Israel). In the gospels, Peter is shown as a close associate of Jesus. His home at Capernaum was at Jesus' disposal, as was his fishing boat, when needed. Jesus cured Peter's mother-in-law, and Peter was among those who attended the wedding at Cana. He plays a prominent part in the account of the miraculous catch of fish, and the walking on the water. In John 20, when Peter and the other disciple run to the empty tomb, the other disciple arrives first, but it is Peter who enters the tomb.

Though among the twelve disciples, Peter is predominant in the first chapters of Acts of the Apostles, the focus shifting to Paul in the later chapters. James the Just, "the brother of the Lord" (Galatians 1:19), appears as the bishop of Jerusalem at the earliest church community in Acts 15. The Ecclesiastical History (4th century) states: "James, ... was the first (as the records tell us) to be elected to the episcopal throne of the Jerusalem church. ... Clement, in Outlines Book VI, puts it thus, 'Peter, James and John, after the Ascension of the Saviour, did not claim pre-eminence because the Saviour had especially honored them, but chose James the Righteous as Bishop of Jerusalem. ... James the Righteous, John, and Peter were entrusted by the Lord after his resurrection with the higher knowledge. They imparted it to the other apostles, and the other apostles to the seventy...'"

For Catholics, St. Peter is commonly considered the first Bishop of Jerusalem. However, they believe the bishop of Jerusalem was not by that fact the head of the Catholic church, since the leadership rested in Peter as the "Rock" and "Chief Shepherd". Catholics who believe Peter was the first bishop of Jerusalem also believe he entrusted the community to James when he was forced to leave Jerusalem, due to Herod Agrippa's persecution.

The 4th century Latin Father Jerome, in his epistle to Augustine of Hippo, wrote that "nay more, that Peter was the prime mover in issuing the decree by which this was affirmed", in relation to the Council of Jerusalem, and again, "and to his opinion the Apostle James, and all the elders together, gave consent".

Jesus said to Peter in verse 19, "I will give to thee the keys of the kingdom of heaven." Especially for the Hebrew people, keys were a symbol of authority; keys are also used to symbolise power over death in Revelation 1:18. Cardinal Gibbons, in his book The Faith of Our Fathers, points out that keys are still a symbol of authority in today's culture; he uses the example of someone giving the keys of his house to another person, and that the latter represented the owner of the house in his absence. In receiving the keys, Peter takes on the office of prime minister, which was well-known to ancient and contemporary Hebrews, and depicted in the Old Testament, as the one who had authority from God to bind and loose.

The Dogmatic Constitution, Pastor aeternus, issued by the First Vatican Council, defined the primacy of the bishop of Rome over the whole Catholic Church as an essential institution of the church that can never be relinquished. This is based on the statement in Matthew 16:18 "And so I say to you, you are Peter, and upon this rock I will build my church, and the gates of the netherworld shall not prevail against it", and John 21:17 "He said to him the third time, 'Simon, son of John, do you love me?' Peter was distressed that he had said to him a third time, 'Do you love me?' and he said to him, 'Lord, you know everything; you know that I love you.' [Jesus] said to him, 'Feed my sheep.'" This conversation with Peter established Peter as the leader of the disciples in Jesus' absence.

[I]t has been ever understood by the Catholic Church ... that Peter in his single person, preferably to all the other Apostles, whether taken separately or together, was endowed by Christ with a true and proper primacy of jurisdiction; ... bestowed immediately and directly upon blessed Peter himself, ...

In December 1996, the Congregation for the Doctrine of the Faith held a doctrinal symposium on "The Primacy of the Successor of Peter". One of the "Reflections" on the essential points of Catholic doctrine on the primacy is that it is a necessary service to unity. A listing of some of the essential points of the doctrine was issued by the prefect of the CDF, Cardinal Joseph Ratzinger. Noting that in the list of the Twelve Apostles in the Synoptics and Acts, Simon/Peter appears first.

From the beginning and with increasing clarity, the Church has understood that, just as there is a succession of the Apostles in the ministry of Bishops, so too the ministry of unity entrusted to Peter belongs to the permanent structure of Christ's Church and that this succession is established in the see of his martyrdom.

The Catechism of the Catholic Church states:

424 Moved by the grace of the Holy Spirit and drawn by the Father, we believe in Jesus and confess: "You are the Christ, the Son of the living God." On the rock of this faith confessed by St. Peter, Christ built his Church.

552 Simon Peter holds the first place in the college of the Twelve; Jesus entrusted a unique mission to him. Through a revelation from the Father, Peter had confessed: "You are the Christ, the Son of the living God." Our Lord then declared to him: "You are Peter, and on this rock I will build my Church, and the gates of Hades will not prevail against it." Christ, the "living Stone", thus assures his Church, built on Peter, of victory over the powers of death. Because of the faith he confessed Peter will remain the unshakable rock of the Church. His mission will be to keep this faith from every lapse and to strengthen his brothers in it.

=== Individuals supporting Roman primacy ===
Both Latin and Greek writers in the early church referred to "rock" as applying to both Peter personally and his faith symbolically, as well as seeing Christ's promise to apply more generally to his twelve apostles and the Catholic Church at large.

==== Irenaeus ====
Irenaeus has been called the most important witness of Christianity in the 2nd century. Taught by Polycarp, who had been instructed by John the apostle, Irenaeus became Bishop of Lyon in 178. In his Against the Heresies, Irenaeus wrote, "Although there are many dialects in the world, the force of the tradition is one and the same. For the same faith is held and handed down by the churches established in the German states, the Spains, among the Celtic tribes, in the East, in Libya, and in the central portions of the world." In Book 3, Irenaeus continues his defense of the unity of the church around the bishop, writing, "By pointing out the apostolic tradition and faith announced to mankind, which has been brought down to our time by successions of bishops, in the greatest, most ancient, and well known church, founded and established by the two most glorious apostles, Peter and Paul, at Rome, we can confound all who in any other way ... gather more than they ought."

Irenaeus asserted the Doctrine of Apostolic Succession to counter the claims of heretics, especially the Gnostics who were attacking the theology and authority of the mainstream church. He stated that one could find true teaching in several leading episcopal sees, not just at Rome. The doctrine he asserted, therefore, has two parts: lineage from the Apostles and right teaching.

==== Ignatius of Antioch ====
Ignatius, bishop of Antioch, was well known for his insistence on the authority of the bishop. In his writings to the church at Smyrna in 115 AD, he encouraged the Smyrnaeans to "Avoid divisions, as the beginning of evil. Follow, all of you, the bishop, as Jesus Christ followed the father; and follow the presbytery as the apostles. Let no man do aught pertaining to the Church apart from the bishop. Wheresoever the bishop appears, there let the people be, even as wheresoever Christ Jesus is, there is the Catholic Church."

==== Tertullian ====
Born in Carthage around 155 AD, Tertullian became a priest around the age of forty and worked tirelessly to defend the faith. In his Scorpiace of 208 AD, Tertullian wrote, "No delay or inquest will meet Christians on the threshold. ... For though you think that heaven is still shut up, remember that the Lord left the keys of it to Peter here, and through him to the Church, which keys everyone will carry with him, if he has been questioned and made confession [of faith]." Scorpiace is the first known historical reference to the keys pertaining to anyone other than Peter. In it, he saw the keys as pertaining to "everyone" if they "made confession", rather than according to the modern interpretation concerning the bishops of Rome alone. Tertullian later retracted even this association in De Pudecitia, listing various reasons why the Keys of Peter pertained to Peter alone. The churches later declared him an apostate along with the followers of Montanus for insisting that authority must be associated with demonstrable power.

==== Cyprian ====
Thascius Caecilius Cyprianus was made bishop of Carthage in 248 AD. but died only ten years later. Throughout his writings, Cyprian asserts that the Rock is Peter, and the church rests upon him. He also claims that as the church is settled upon the bishops, they too have authority. He writes, "They, who have departed from the Church, do not allow the Church to recall and bring back the lapsed. There is one God, and one Christ, and one Church, and one chair founded by the voice of the Lord on the rock. Another altar cannot be set up, nor a new priesthood made, besides the one altar and the one priesthood. Whoever gathers elsewhere scatters." In his 251 AD De Catholicae Ecclesiae Unitate, Cyprian asks, "He who deserts the chair of Peter, upon whom the Church was founded, does he trust himself to be in the Church?"

Regarding the interpretation of Matthew 16:18–19, Jaroslav Pelikan writes: "[T]he ancient Christian father Cyprian used it to prove the authority of the bishop—not merely of the Roman bishop, but of every bishop", referring to Maurice Bevenot's work on St. Cyprian. Eastern Catholics agree with the above, and hold the same essential doctrines as all other Catholics, but also as a theological reflection usually consider Peter in some way to exemplify the other bishops as well.

==== John Chrysostom ====
John Chrysostom was born at Antioch around 347 and would fight for the reform of the church until his exile in 404. His homilies emphasize his belief in the primacy. He called Peter "the leader of the choir, the mouth of all the apostles, the head of that tribe, the ruler of the whole world, the foundation of the Church, the ardent lover of Christ." His writings also emphasize the mortality of Peter, linking him more closely to the people of the church.

And why, then, passing by the others, does He converse with Peter on these things? (John 21:15). He was the chosen one of the Apostles, and the mouth of the disciples, and the leader of the choir. On this account, Paul also went up on a time to see him rather than the others (Galatians 1:18). And withal, to show him that he must thenceforward have confidence, as the denial was done away with, He puts into his hands the presidency over the brethren. And He brings not forward the denial, nor reproaches him with what had past, but says, "If you love me, preside over the brethren." ... And the third time He gives him the same injunction, showing what a price He sets the presidency over His own sheep. And if one should say, "How then did James receive the throne of Jerusalem?", this I would answer that He appointed this man (Peter) teacher, not of that throne, but of the whole world.

==== Augustine of Hippo ====
Augustine of Hippo was born in Numidia in 354 AD and was baptized in Milan in 387 AD. He was also bishop of Hippo from 397 AD until his death in 430 AD. Augustine taught that Peter was first amongst the apostles, and thus represents the church. His Sermo states, "Peter in many places in the Scriptures appears to represent the Church, especially in that place where it was said 'I give to thee the keys ... shall be loosed in heaven'. What! did Peter receive these keys, and Paul not receive? Did Peter receive and John and James not receive, and the rest of the apostles? But since in a figure Peter represented the Church, what was given to him singly was given to the Church." His 395 AD Contra Epistolam Manichaei states, "There are many other things which rightly keep me in the bosom of the Catholic Church. ... The succession of the priests keeps me, from the very seat of the apostle Peter (to whom the Lord after his resurrection gave charge to feed his sheep) down to the present episcopate."

==== Pope Innocent I ====
Innocent I held the papal office from 402 to 417. Modern theories of papal primacy developed around Innocent and his writings. In a 416 AD letter to Decentius, bishop of Eugubium, Innocent writes, "Who does not know or observe that it [the church order] was delivered by Peter the chief of the apostles to the Roman church, and is kept until now, and ought to be retained by all, and that nothing ought to be imposed or introduced which has no authority, or seems to derive its precedents elsewhere?" It is also during this time that bishops began to recognize Innocent's primacy as Pope over other bishops in the West. This is made evident, among others, in a letter from the Council at Mileve to Innocent in 416 AD, which alludes to the authority of "his holiness" drawn from the authority of Scripture. The doctrine of primacy was beginning to take shape with Innocent's papacy.

==== Pope Leo I ====
Based on his knowledge of the Petrine texts of the Gospel, and his writings which expound upon it, it is easy to see that Leo I identified with the authority bestowed on Peter as bishop of Rome. Leo himself was consecrated bishop of Rome in 440 AD. He writes that "The right of this power did indeed pass on to other apostles, and the order of this decree passed on to all the chiefs of the Church; but not in vain was that which was imparted to all entrusted to but one. Therefore this is commended to Peter separately, because all the rulers of the Church are invested with the figure of Peter. …So then in Peter the strength of all is fortified, and the help of divine grace is so ordered that the stability which through Christ is given to Peter, through Peter is conveyed to the apostles." The Council of Chalcedon would later refer to Leo as "him who had been charged with the custody of the vine by the savior."

==== Pope Gregory VII ====
The Gregorian Reform movement was rather a series of movements many of which involved the reform of the Catholic Church, headed by Gregory VII, formerly the Archdeacon Hildebrand. Gregory became Pope in 1073 with the objective of reforming not the body of the church, but a purification of the clergy in general. Gregory is perhaps most recognized with the quarrel between himself and King Henry IV of Germany, known as the "Investiture Contest". Gregory's Dictus Pape outlines his policies and ideals, as well as those of the Catholic Church. In this work, Gregory claims that the pope has power to depose and restore bishops, and also effectively reduces the authority of other bishops. This doctrine supported the idea that Rome and the church here also afforded primacy over all other churches. Gregory's papacy also bolstered the power of the church over that of the State. The Gregorians defended the ideal of a separation of powers, claiming "Let kings have what belongs to kings, and priests have what belongs to priests." The Petrine primacy was now more affirmed than ever.

=== Challenges ===
==== Councils ====
Many challenges faced the popes claiming primacy throughout the history of Catholicism. The Edict of Milan, the Council of Nicea, and the First Council of Constantinople all dealt with the issue of primacy in that they amended the power of the popes over the other bishops. The third canon of the First Council of Constantinople of 381 AD declares Constantinople the new Rome, gives the Bishop of Rome the seat of honor and gives the Bishop of Constantinople second place in honor. The Council of Ephesus in 431 AD offers debate as to whether the results determine that the pope is at the head of the church, or rather that it is under the authority of a council of bishops. Although the highlight of the Council of Chalcedon in 451 AD was the confession of the Person of Christ, the Council also resulted in limitations to the powers of the bishops. Many letters of the Council identify its position as in agreement with papal primacy. Those present employ titles such as "the most holy and beloved of God" and "ecumenical archbishop and patriarch of great Rome" to address Pope Leo. Thus, as not all can be satisfied with the results, the Council of Chalcedon resulted in a schism with the Oriental Orthodox Churches.

==== Schism ====
The papacy's most widely known crisis, as well as its largest challenge to authority, came with the "Western Schism" in the late Middle Ages, dating from 1378–1417. Seven popes ruled from Avignon in France in the early 14th century, until Gregory XI risked returning to turbulent Italy and the Roman seat. Following the close of the Avignon papacy in 1377, Urban VI, an Italian, took the reins over a predominantly French college of Cardinals. The Cardinals called the election into question and elected Clement VII as Pope. Germany, Italy, England, and the rest of Northern and Eastern Europe remained loyal to Urban, while France, Spain, Scotland, and Rome followed Clement VII (1378–1394) and his successor, Benedict XIII (1394–1417) who would reside in Avignon.

== Matthew 16:18 ==
Controversy has surrounded one particular text that is linked with the Aramaic nickname כפא (Cepha), meaning "rock", that Jesus gave the man previously known as Simon. The Greeks translated it as Πέτρος (Petros), a new form, appropriately masculine, of the standard feminine word πέτρα (petra), also meaning "rock"; this was translated into Latin as Petrus.

While the reasons for disagreement on the nature of the primacy are complex, hinging on matters of doctrine, history and politics, the debate is often reduced to a discussion of the meaning and translation of Matthew 16:18: "And I say to thee: That thou art Peter; and upon this rock I will build my church, and the gates of hell shall not prevail against it."

In the Greek text, the new name given is Πέτρος (Petros), and in the second half of the same verse the word translated as "rock" is πέτρα (petra). A literal translation, in the style of the King James Version, of the words presumably used by Jesus would be "Thou art Rock, and upon this rock will I build my church". (Note: In French, the translation, "Tu es Pierre, et sur cette pierre je bâtirai mon Église, et les portes de l'enfer ne prévaudront point contre elle", preserves exactly the play on words in what is believed to be the original Aramaic.) To preserve a supposed pun, the Greek text chose to translate Peter's name as Πέτρος rather than using the Aramaic name Κηφᾶς (Cephas).

One common Protestant argument historically has been that the translation from the New Testament in Hebrew into Greek is tenuous at best as there is no real evidence or indication that the New Testament (in Greek) was ever translated from Hebrew or Aramaic texts; for that argument see Aramaic primacy. According to the Protestant transliteration argument, in the language that Jesus spoke, the same word, כפא (cepha), was used for both Peter's name and for the rock on which Jesus said he would build his church. Since the Protestant Reformation, many non-Catholics have challenged the Catholic Church's position, questioning whether the feminine πέτρα refers to Peter, and claiming it may instead refer to either Peter's confession of faith or to Jesus himself.

== Eastern Orthodox view ==
=== A different understanding of primacy ===
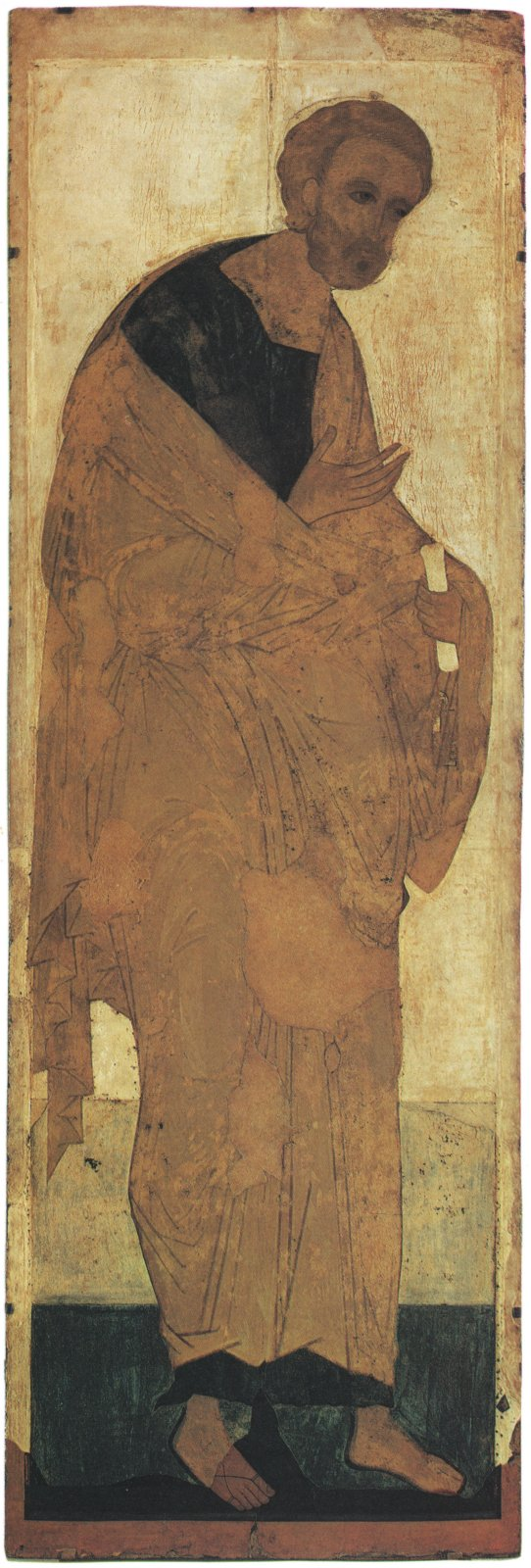
Icon of St. Peter (15th century, Russian State Museum, Saint Petersburg).

The Eastern Orthodox Church regards the Apostle Peter, together with the Apostle Paul, as "preeminent apostles". Paul and Peter are both termed Coryphaeus, which could be translated as "Choir-director", or lead singer.

John Meyendorff, a 20th century Orthodox scholar, states, "[T]he great Cappadocians, St. John Chrysostom, and St. Augustine all concur in affirming that the faith of Simon made it possible for him to become the Rock on which the Church is founded, and that in a certain sense all those who share the same faith are his successors." In this traditional Orthodox and Patristic view, the church is the local Eucharistic assembly ("the diocese" in today's terminology) and the one who holds the "Chair of Peter" (Cyprian's expression) is the bishop. As a result, the primacy of Peter is relevant to the relationship between the bishop and the presbyters, not between the bishop of Rome and the other bishops who are all equally holding Peter's chair.

As John Meyendorff explained:

A very clear patristic tradition sees the succession of Peter in the episcopal ministry. The doctrine of St Cyprian of Carthage on the "See of Peter" being present in every local Church, and not only in Rome, is well-known. It is also found in the East, among people who certainly never read the De unitate ecclesia of Cyprian, but who share its main idea, thus witnessing to it as part of the catholic tradition of the Church. St Gregory of Nyssa, for example, affirms that Christ "through Peter gave to the bishops the keys of the heavenly honors", and the author of the Areopagitica, when speaking of the "hierarchs" of the Church, refers immediately to the image of St Peter. A careful analysis of ecclesiastical literature both Eastern and Western, of the first millennium, including such documents as the lives of the saint, would certainly show that this tradition was a persistent one; and indeed it belongs to the essence of Christian ecclesiology to consider any local bishop to be the teacher of his flock and therefore to fulfill sacramentally, through apostolic succession, the office of the first true believer, Peter. ... There exists, however, another succession, equally recognized by Byzantine theologians, but only on the level of the analogy existing between the apostolic college and the episcopal college, this second succession being determined by the need for ecclesiastical order. Its limits are determined by the Councils, and – in the Byzantine practice – by the "very pious emperors".

— The Primacy of Peter, p. 89

The notion that many Sees were 'of Peter' had also once been held in the West. Pope Gregory I states that:

Your most sweet Holiness has spoken much in your letter to me about the chair of Saint Peter, Prince of the apostles, saying that he himself now sits on it in the persons of his successors. ... Wherefore though there are many apostles, yet with regard to the principality itself the See of the Prince of the apostles alone has grown strong in authority, which in three places is the See of one. ... He himself stablished (sic) the See in which, though he was to leave it, he sat for seven years. Since then it is the See of one, and one See, over which by Divine authority three bishops now preside, whatever good I hear of you, this I impute to myself.

The Orthodox also consider that Pope Linus, not Peter, was actually the first Bishop of Rome.

Of the church of Rome, Linus the son of Claudia was the first, ordained by Paul; and Clemens (Clement), after Linus' death, the second, ordained by me Peter.

=== 'Keys' and 'rock' not exclusive to Peter ===
Eastern Orthodox theologians agree that in Matthew 16:18, "rock" is a likely reference to Peter personally since the very name "Peter" means "rock". However, Matthew 18:18 implies that the other Apostles were given the same powers. Although the word keys is explicitly absent from this later verse a number of Church Fathers recognised that the meaning of keys is implicitly there, and that the rest of the church has the keys:

What, now, (has this to do) with the Church, and your (church), indeed, Psychic? For, in accordance with the person of Peter, it is to spiritual men that this power will correspondingly appertain, either to an apostle or else to a prophet.

— Tertullian

This faith it is which is the foundation of the Church; through this faith the gates of hell cannot prevail against her. This is the faith which has the keys of the kingdom of heaven. Whatsoever this faith shall have loosed or bound on earth shall be loosed or bound in heaven. This faith is the Father's gift by revelation; even the knowledge that we must not imagine a false Christ, a creature made out of nothing, but must confess Him the Son of God, truly possessed of the Divine nature.

— Hilary of Poitiers

For (John) the Son of thunder, the beloved of Christ, the pillar of the Churches throughout the world, who holds the keys of heaven, who drank the cup of Christ, and was baptized with His baptism, who lay upon his Master's bosom, with much confidence, this man now comes forward to us now.

— John Chrysostom

He has given, therefore, the keys to His Church, that whatsoever it should bind on earth might be bound in heaven, and whatsoever it should loose on earth might be, loosed in heaven; that is to say, that whosoever in the Church should not believe that his sins are remitted, they should not be remitted to him; but that whosoever should believe and should repent, and turn from his sins, should be saved by the same faith and repentance on the ground of which he is received into the bosom of the Church. For he who does not believe that his sins can be pardoned, falls into despair, and becomes worse as if no greater good remained for him than to be evil, when he has ceased to have faith in the results of his own repentance.

— Augustine

Peter, the first of the apostles, received the keys of the kingdom of heaven for the binding and loosing of sins; and for the same congregation of saints, in reference to the perfect repose in the bosom of that mysterious life to come did the evangelist John recline on the breast of Christ. For it is not the former alone but the whole Church, that bindeth and looseth sins; nor did the latter alone drink at the fountain of the Lord's breast, to emit again in preaching, of the Word in the beginning, God with God, and those other sublime truths regarding the divinity of Christ, and the Trinity and Unity of the whole Godhead.

... the keys that were given to the Church,

How the Church? Why, to her it was said, "To thee I will give the keys of the kingdom of heaven, and whatsoever thou shall loose on earth shall be loosed in heaven, and whatsoever thou shall bind on earth shall be bound in heaven."

Moreover, Eastern Orthodox theologians follow such Church Fathers as John Chrysostom by clarifying that "rock" simultaneously refers to Peter (instrumentally) as well as Peter's confession of faith which is what has ultimate significance in establishing the church.

Some Orthodox scholars do not see Peter as being in any way above the other apostles, arguing that Peter did not have power and authority over them during Christ's public ministry. There were no positions of power between the twelve disciples, only "degrees of intimacy" or "degrees of honor". According to this view, Peter has a weak symbolic primacy or primacy of honor (in the sense of a purely honorary primacy). In the patristic era, this was actually the Western view held by St. Augustine. Others (see above), following the traditional Byzantine view of John Chrysostom see Peter as the icon of the bishop and therefore endowed with authority in the church (i.e. the diocese).

Come now, you who would indulge a better curiosity, if you would apply it to the business of your salvation, run over the apostolic churches, in which the very thrones of the apostles are still pre-eminent in their places, in which their own authentic writings are read, uttering the voice and representing the face of each of them severally. Achaia is very near you, (in which) you find Corinth. Since you are not far from Macedonia, you have Philippi; (and there too) you have the Thessalonians. Since you are able to cross to Asia, you get Ephesus. Since, moreover, you are close upon Italy, you have Rome, from which there comes even into our own hands the very authority (of apostles themselves). How happy is its church, on which apostles poured forth all their doctrine along with their blood! where Peter endures a passion like his Lord's! where Paul wins his crown in a death like John's where the Apostle John was first plunged, unhurt, into boiling oil, and thence remitted to his island-exile!

— Tertullian

Was anything withheld from the knowledge of Peter, who is called "the rock on which the church should be built", who also obtained "the keys of the kingdom of heaven", with the power of "loosing and binding in heaven and on earth"? Was anything, again, concealed from John, the Lord's most beloved disciple, who used to lean on His breast to whom alone the Lord pointed Judas out as the traitor, whom He commended to Mary as a son in His own stead?

As a king sending forth governors, gives power to cast into prison and to deliver from it, so in sending these forth, Christ investeth them with the same power.

— John Chrysostom

... though He has delegated the care of His sheep to many shepherds, yet He has not Himself abandoned the guardianship of His beloved flock.

— Pope Leo I

=== Examples from history ===
Orthodox historians also maintain that Rome's authority in the early Eastern Roman (or Byzantine) empire was recognized only partially because of Rome's Petrine character, and that this factor was not the decisive issue. Moreover, the Orthodox view is that Rome's privileges were not understood as an absolute power (i.e., the difference between primacy and supremacy). In the East, there were numerous "apostolic sees", Jerusalem being considered the "mother of all churches", and the bishop of Antioch could also claim the title of successor to Peter, being that Peter was the first bishop of Antioch. "Canon 28 of Chalcedon was for [the Byzantines] one of the essential texts for the organization of the Church: "'It is for right reasons that accorded privileges to old Rome, for this city was the seat of the Emperor and the Senate.' ... The reason why the Roman Church had been accorded an incontestable precedence over all other apostolic churches was that its Petrine and Pauline 'apostolicity' was in fact added to the city's position as the capital city, and only the conjunction of both of these elements gave the Bishop of Rome the right to occupy the place of a primate in the Christian world with the consensus of all the churches."

John Meyendorff writes, "[O]ur Byzantine documents authentically reflect the position of the Orthodox Church in regard to Roman ecclesiology, and have, as such, the value of a testimony very little known, often unpublished, and therefore ignored by a great number of contemporary theologians. ... [T]he development of the Roman primacy in the West remained unnoticed for ... a long time in the West. ... Even in the ninth century they did not realize that their previous acclamations [of the Roman papacy] were being interpreted in Rome as formal definitions of the Roman right to a primacy of power." The Roman way of using the idea of "development of doctrine" is often viewed critically in Orthodoxy.

== Protestant views ==
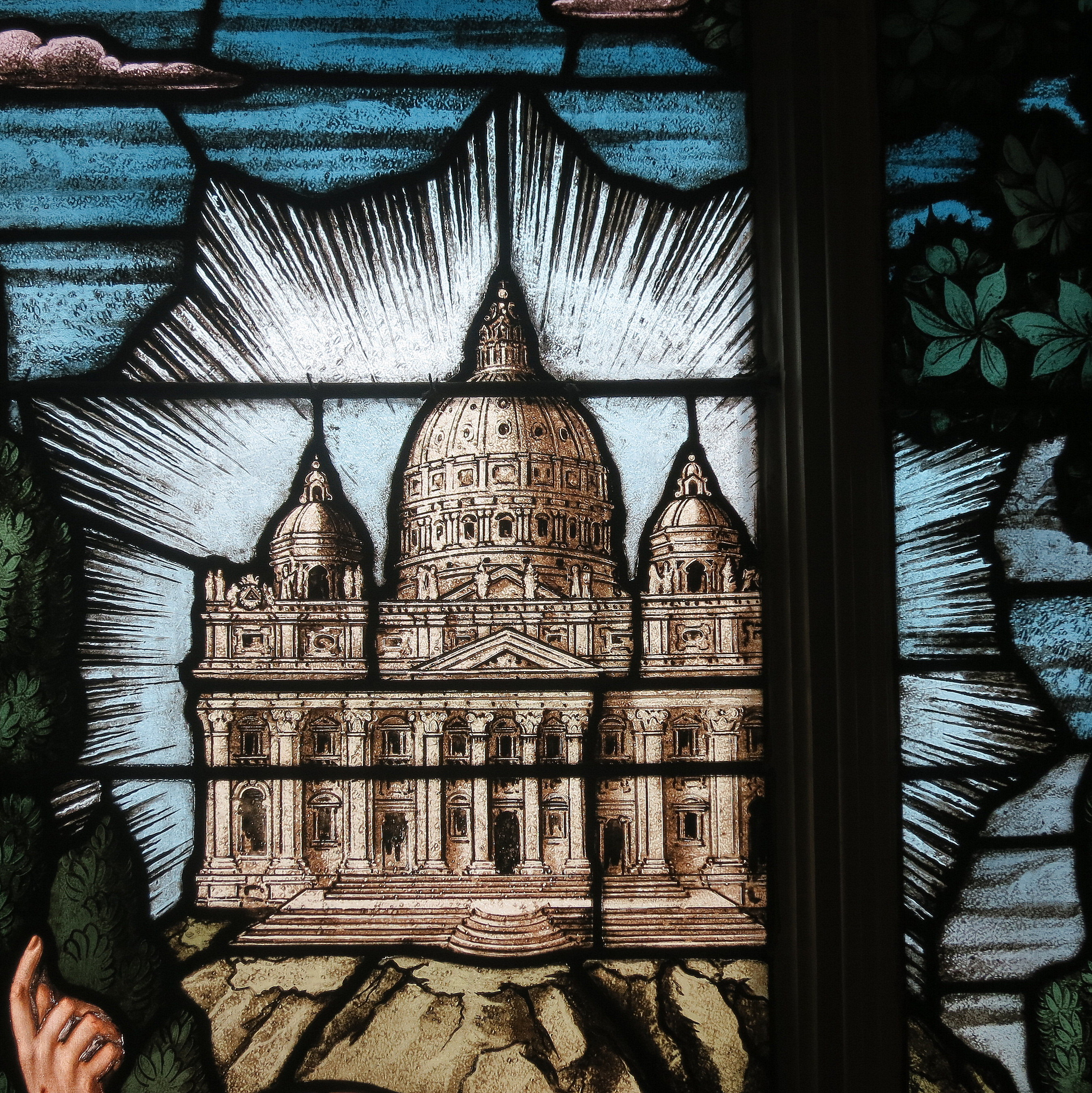
Stained glass window in a Catholic church depicting St. Peter's Basilica in Rome sitting "Upon this rock", a reference to Matthew 16:18. Most present-day Catholics interpret Jesus as saying he was building his church on the rock of the Apostle Peter and the succession of popes which claim Apostolic succession from him.

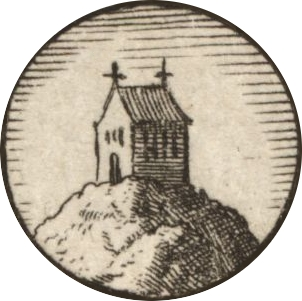
A 17th century illustration of Article VII: Of the Church from the Augsburg Confession, which states "... one holy Church is to continue forever. The Church is the congregation of saints, in which the Gospel is rightly taught and the Sacraments are rightly administered." Here the rock from Matthew 16:18 refers to the preaching and ministry of Jesus as the Christ, a view discussed at length in the 1537 Treatise.

A major debate between Catholics and Protestants centers on Matthew 16:18 where Jesus tells Peter: "You are Peter, and on this rock I will build my Church." Catholics interpret the verse as saying that Jesus would build his church on Peter, the apostle: Jesus told Peter (Rock) that he would build his Church on this Rock (Peter), and that Peter was made the shepherd of the apostolic flock – hence their assertion of the Primacy of the Catholic Pontiff.

One Protestant view on the Matthew verse agrees with the Catholic view, with disagreements about primacy stemming from doctrinal sources, and disagreements such as those over the identification of Simon Peter with the Pope. Other Protestants assert the following, based specifically on the verse in Matthew:

Jesus gives Simon the new name petros. However he refers to the "rock" as petra. This scripture was written in Greek, not Aramaic; what Jesus might have said in Aramaic is conjecture. In Greek, there is a distinction between the two words, πέτρα being a "rock" but πέτρος being a "small stone" or "pebble". (James G. McCarthy translates the two as "mass of rock" and "boulder or detached stone", respectively). Jesus is not referring to Peter when talking about "this rock", but is in fact referring to Peter's confession of faith in the preceding verses. Jesus thus does not declare the primacy of Peter, but rather declares that his church will be built upon the foundation of the revelation of and confession of faith of Jesus as the Christ.

Many Protestant scholars, however, reject this position, such as Craig L. Blomberg who states, "The expression 'this rock' almost certainly refers to Peter, following immediately after his name, just as the words following 'the Christ' in verse 16 applied to Jesus. The play on words in the Greek between Peter's name (Petros) and the word 'rock' (petra) makes sense only if Peter is the Rock and if Jesus is about to explain the significance of this identification."

Donald A. Carson III states:

Although it is true that petros and petra can mean "stone" and "rock" respectively in earlier Greek, the distinction is largely confined to poetry. Moreover the underlying Aramaic is in this case unquestionable; and most probably kepha was used in both clauses ("you are kepha" and "on this kepha"), since the word was used both for a name and for a "rock". The Peshitta (written in Syriac, a language cognate with Aramaic) makes no distinction between the words in the two clauses. The Greek makes the distinction between petros and petra simply because it is trying to preserve the pun, and in Greek the feminine petra could not very well serve as a masculine name.

An alternative Protestant argument is that when Jesus said "upon this rock" in the aforementioned Matthew verse, he referred to himself, in reference to Deuteronomy 32:3–4, which states that "God ... is the Rock; his work is perfect". This idea also appears in 1 Corinthians 10:4, which says "that Rock is Christ". In Ephesians 2:20, Jesus is called "the chief cornerstone".

=== Meaning of "Rock" ===
In the original Greek the word translated as "Peter" is Πέτρος (Petros) and that translated as "rock" is πέτρα (petra), two words that, while not identical, give an impression of one of many times when Jesus used a play on words. Furthermore, if Jesus spoke to Peter in their native Aramaic language, he would have used kepha in both instances. The Peshitta Text and the Old Syriac text use the word kepha for both "Peter" and "rock" in Matthew 16:18. John 1:42 says Jesus called Simon "Cephas", as does Paul in some letters. He was instructed by Christ to strengthen his brethren, i.e., the apostles. Peter also had a leadership role in the early Christian church at Jerusalem according to the Acts of the Apostles chapters 1–2, 10–11, and 15.

Early Catholic Latin and Greek writers (such as John Chrysostom) considered the "foundation rock" as applying to both Peter personally and his confession of faith (or the faith of his confession) symbolically, as well as seeing Christ's promise to apply more generally to his twelve apostles and the Christian Church at large. This "double meaning" interpretation is present in the current Catechism of the Catholic Church.

Protestant counter-claims to the Catholic interpretation are largely based on the difference between the Greek words translated "Rock" in the Matthean passage. In classical Attic Greek petros generally meant "pebble", while petra meant "boulder" or "cliff". Accordingly, taking Peter's name to mean "pebble", they argue that the "rock" in question cannot have been Peter, but something else, either Jesus himself, or the faith in Jesus that Peter had just professed. However, the New Testament was written in Koiné Greek, not Attic Greek, and some authorities say no significant difference existed between the meanings of petros and petra.

However, even though the feminine noun petra is translated as rock in the phrase "on this rock I will build my church", the word petra (πέτρα) is also used in 1 Corinthians 10:4 in describing Jesus, which reads: "They all ate the same spiritual food and drank the same spiritual drink; for they drank from the spiritual rock that accompanied them, and that rock was Christ."

Although Matthew 16 is used as a primary proof-text for the Catholic doctrine of Papal supremacy, Protestant scholars say that prior to the Reformation of the 16th century, Matthew 16 was very rarely used to support papal claims. Their position is that most of the early and medieval church interpreted the 'rock' as being a reference either to Christ or to Peter's faith, not Peter himself. They understand Jesus' remark to have been his affirmation of Peter's testimony that Jesus was the Son of God.

Another rebuttal of the Catholic position is that if Peter really means the Rock which makes him the chief of Apostles, it would contradict the Bible's teaching in Ephesians 2:20, which says that the church's foundation is the apostles and prophets, not Peter alone. They posit that the meaning of Matthew 16:18 is that Jesus uses a play on words with Peter's name to say that the confession he had just made is the rock on which the church is built.

Other theologically conservative Christians, including Confessional Lutherans, also rebut comments made by Karl Keating and D. A. Carson who claim that there is no distinction between the words petros and petra in Koine Greek. The Lutheran theologians state that the dictionaries of Koine Greek, including the authoritative Bauer-Danker-Arndt-Gingrich Lexicon, indeed list both words and the passages that give different meanings for each. Conservative Lutheran apologists state:

There is no biblical or historical evidence for the claims of the Roman Catholic church that Peter was the first pope. In fact there is no evidence that there even was a pope in the first century. Even Catholic historians recognize this as a historical fact. ... We honor Peter and in fact some of our churches are named after him, but he was not the first pope, nor was he Roman Catholic. If you read his first letter, you will see that he did not teach a Roman hierarchy, but that all Christians are royal priests.

=== Partial Protestant support ===
Partial support for the Catholic position comes from Oscar Cullmann. He disagrees with Luther and the Protestant reformers who held that by "rock" Christ did not mean Peter, but meant either himself or the faith of His followers. He believes the meaning of the original Aramaic is very clear: that kepha was the Aramaic word for "rock", and that it was also the name by which Christ called Peter.

Yet, Cullmann sharply rejects the Catholic claim that Peter began the papal succession. He writes: "In the life of Peter there is no starting point for a chain of succession to the leadership of the church at large." While he believes the Matthew text is entirely valid and is in no way spurious, he says it cannot be used as "warrant of the papal succession".

Cullmann concludes that while Peter was the original head of the apostles, Peter was not the founder of any visible church succession.

There are other Protestant scholars who also partially defend the historical Catholic position about the "Rock". Taking a somewhat different approach from Cullman, they point out that the Gospel of Matthew was not written in the classical Attic form of Greek, but in the Hellenistic Koine dialect in which there is no distinction in meaning between petros and petra. Moreover, even in Attic Greek, in which the regular meaning of petros was a smallish stone, there are instances of its use to refer to larger rocks, as in Sophocles, Oedipus at Colonus v. 1595, where petros refers to a boulder used as a landmark, obviously something more than a pebble. In any case, a petros/petra distinction is irrelevant considering the Aramaic language in which the phrase might well have been spoken. In Greek, of any period, the feminine noun petra could not be used as the given name of a male, which may explain the use of Petros as the Greek word with which to translate Aramaic Kepha.

However, still other Protestant scholars believe that Jesus in fact did mean to single out Peter as the very rock which he will build upon, but that the passage does nothing to indicate a continued succession of Peter's implied position. They assert that Matthew uses the demonstrative pronoun taute, which allegedly means "this very" or "this same", when he refers to the rock on which Jesus' church will be built. He also uses the Greek word for "and", kai. It is alleged that when a demonstrative pronoun is used with kai, the pronoun refers back to the preceding noun. The second rock Jesus refers to must then be the same rock as the first one; and if Peter is the first rock he must also be the second.

The New Apostolic Church believes in the re-established Apostle ministry. It sees Peter as the first Chief Apostle in the Early Church.

=== Lutheran view ===
From the Book of Concord:

Chrysostom says thus: "Upon this rock", not upon Peter. For He built His Church not upon man, but upon the faith of Peter. But what was his faith? "Thou art the Christ, the Son of the living God." And Hilary says: To Peter the Father revealed that he should say, "Thou art the Son of the living God." Therefore, the building of the Church is upon this rock of confession; this faith is the foundation of the Church.

Unlike Oscar Cullmann, Confessional Lutherans and many other Protestant apologists agree that it's meaningless to elaborate the meaning of "Rock" by looking at the Aramaic language. While the Jews spoke mostly Aramaic at home, in public they usually spoke Greek. The few Aramaic words spoken by Jesus in public were unusual, which is why they are noted as such. And most importantly the New Testament was revealed in Koine Greek, not Aramaic.

Modern Lutheran historians even disclose that the Catholic Church did not, at least unanimously, regard Peter as the Rock until the 1870s:

Rome's rule for explaining the Scriptures and determining doctrine is the Creed of Pius IV. This Creed binds Rome to explain the Scriptures only according to the unanimous consent of the Fathers. In the year 1870 when the Fathers gathered and the pope declared his infallibility, the cardinals were not in agreement on Matthew 16, 18. They had five different interpretations. Seventeen insisted, Peter is the rock. Sixteen held that Christ is the rock. Eight were emphatic that the whole apostolic college is the rock. Forty-four said, Peter's faith is the rock, The remainder looked upon the whole body of believers as the rock. – And yet Rome taught and still teaches that Peter is the rock.

Lutheran apologists criticize:

All of the arguments Roman Catholicism brings to set Peter up as the first Pope are done only to uphold its false teaching which says that people are saved, not by Christ's saving alone, but also by the deeds of penance they do. It is this teaching, which Roman Catholicism says has been taught by Popes ever since Peter, which also gives us the reason for the way Roman Catholicism interprets Mt 16:18.

== View of the Church of Jesus Christ of Latter-day Saints ==
The Church of Jesus Christ of Latter-day Saints (LDS Church) accepts the primacy of Peter, although it does not generally use the term. The LDS Church teaches that Peter was the chief apostle and head of the church after Christ's ascension. The LDS Church further teaches that all Melchizedek Priesthood authority in the church must come through a line of authority traceable directly from Christ through Peter. However, in contrast to other groups, they believe that the line of succession was at some point broken following the death of the apostles, necessitating a restoration of the priesthood authority. The LDS Church teaches that this restoration occurred with the appearance of the resurrected Peter, James, and John, who conferred the authority on Joseph Smith and Oliver Cowdery in 1829. Members of the LDS Church can request a written line of authority tracing back to Christ through Peter through this path.

Despite the acceptance of Peter's primacy, several leaders of the LDS Church have taught that the rock referred to by Jesus in Matthew 16:18 was neither Peter nor his confession, but the gift of revelation from the Holy Spirit which made Christ's divinity known to Peter. Apostle Howard W. Hunter taught:

"And upon this rock I will build my church." Upon what rock? Peter? Upon a man? No, not upon a man, upon the rock of revelation, the thing which they were talking about. He had just said, "... flesh and blood hath not revealed it unto thee, but my Father which is in heaven." This revelation that Jesus is the Christ is the foundation upon which he would build his Church.

Church founder Joseph Smith is quoted as having said:

Jesus in His teachings says, "Upon this rock I will build my Church, and the gates of hell shall not prevail against it." What rock? Revelation.

Although these quotes may represent normative LDS belief, none of them are from canonized doctrinal sources. The LDS Church therefore has no official doctrinal interpretation of Matthew 16:18.

== See also ==
- Apostolic Succession
- Early Christianity
- Historical episcopate
- Papal infallibility
- Papal supremacy
