= Porta Coeli =

Porta Coeli (Latin, 'Heaven's Gate') may refer to:

- Porta coeli Convent, in the Czech Republic
  - 3276 Porta Coeli, a main-belt asteroid named after the convent
- Porta Coeli (Puerto Rico), a convent
- Tennenbach Abbey, Germany, originally called Porta Coeli
- Porta Coeli, a fictional warship in C. S. Forester's 1946 novel Lord Hornblower
- Porta Cœli, a Spanish warship captured in 1704 by Rear Admiral Thomas Dilkes

== See also ==
- Gates of Heaven (disambiguation)
- Himmelpforten Monastery (Harz), Germany
- Himmelpforten Convent (Latin: Conventus Porta Coeli) in today's Lower Saxony, Germany
- Porta Coeli Charterhouse, a functioning Carthusian monastery in Valencia, Spain
- Porta Coeli Cathedral, Mexico City
