= Keys of the kingdom =

Christian concept of eternal church authority

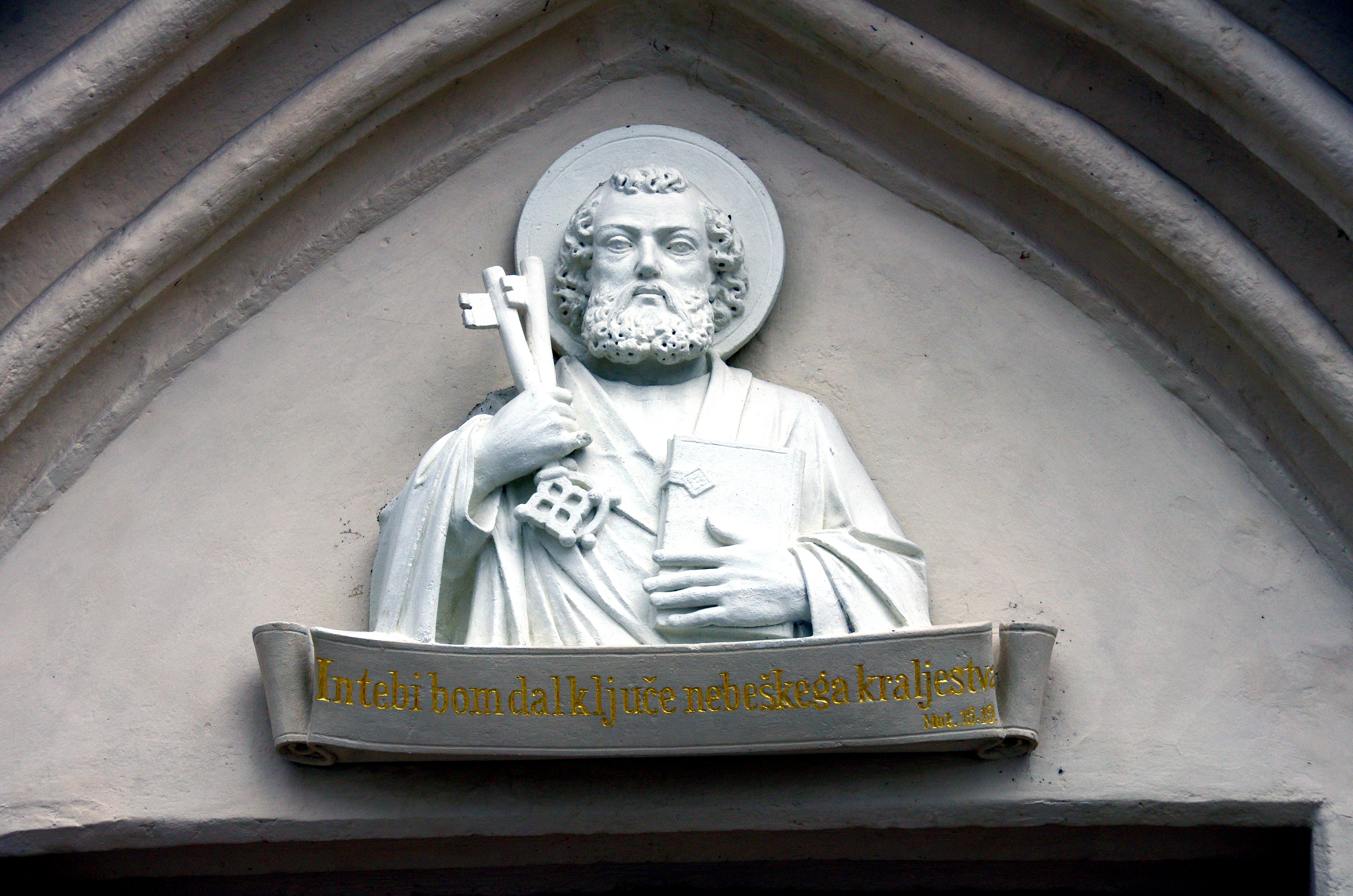
The relief of St. Peter at the portal of St Peter's church at Radovljica in Slovenia. The inscription, written in Slovene, reads: "I will give you the keys of the kingdom of heaven".

The keys of the kingdom is a Christian concept of eternal church authority. Christians believe it was established in the 1st century AD, initially through Saint Peter then through the rest of the 12 Apostles. The latter, continuing with the early Church Fathers, would eventually comprise the early church and its doctrine. It is this authority, having been given the keys, that subsequent doctrinal points have been built upon.

The authority can be traced to one passage in the New Testament, where Jesus mentions them first in response to St. Peter answering a question and secondly in speaking to a group of disciples. In these two instances, the concept of authority follows having been given the "keys of the kingdom of heaven" and regards loosing and binding things on earth, and thus having loosened and bound the same in heaven (Matthew 16:19, Matthew 18:18). A third authority regarding sin is seen without mentioning "keys" in John 20:23.

Not all adherents to the faith in the risen Jesus Christ follow the further doctrinal concepts of sole authority held in any particular church, organization, or individual today. One view is that the keys were used for a specific purpose and at a set time; namely at the Day of Pentecost—the baptism of the Holy Spirit. There is much debate regarding the further doctrinal base the church's leadership established in the early centuries.

Many subsequent Restorationist denominations and religious groups today, including the Church of Jesus Christ of Latter-day Saints (LDS Church) and The Family International, believe they also hold this authority. In the LDS Church, the concept is strongly tied to the priesthood keys held by the President of the Church and the Quorum of the Twelve Apostles.

== Passage in context ==
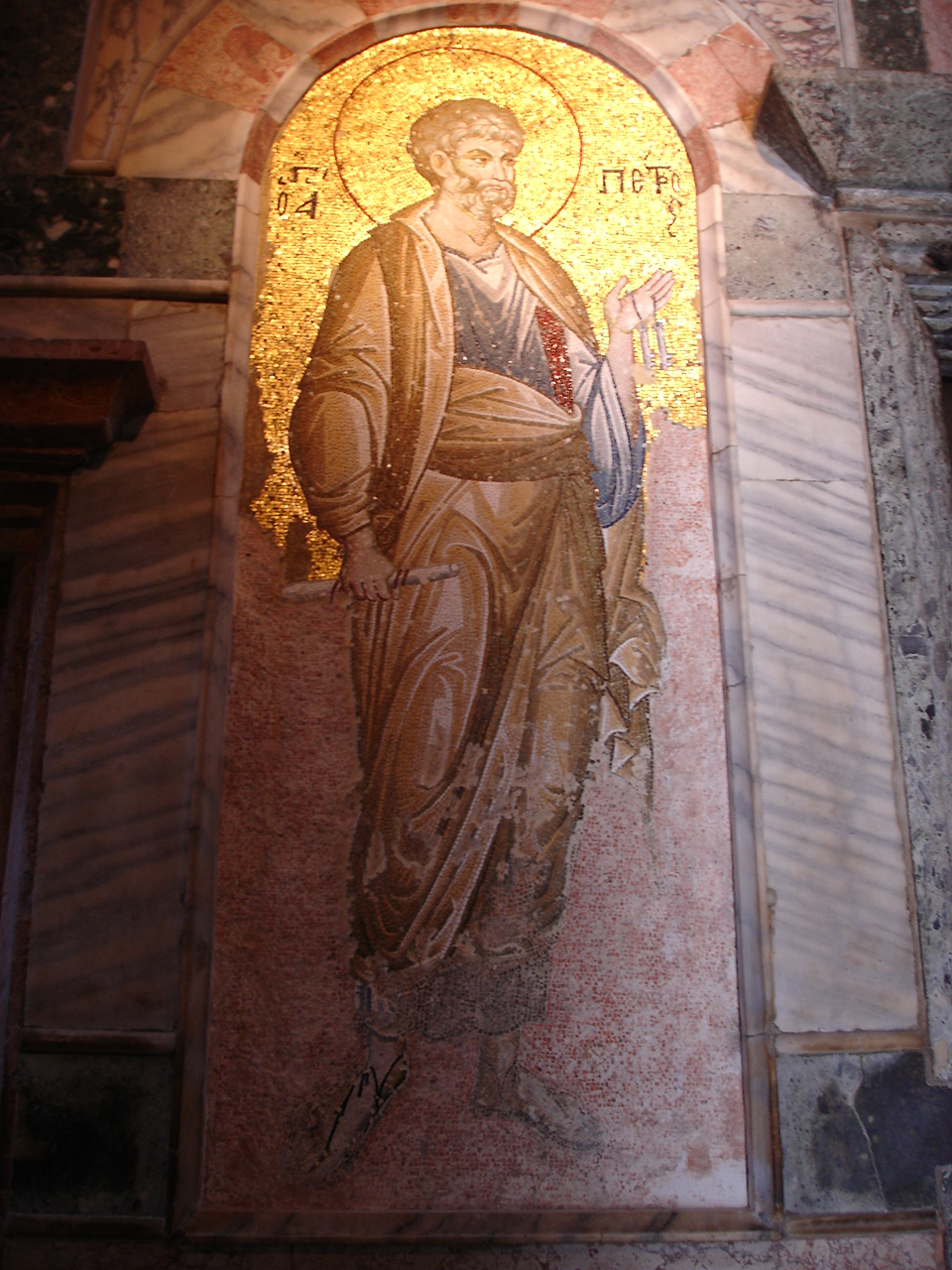
St. Peter the Apostle with the keys, mosaic in the medieval Byzantine Greek Orthodox of the Church of the Holy Saviour in Chora, Istanbul, Turkey

As found in the Gospel of Matthew, chapter 16, within the context of verses 13-20:

13 When Jesus came to the region of Caesarea Philippi, he asked his disciples, “Who do people say the Son of Man is?”

14 They replied, “Some say John the Baptist; others say Elijah; and still others, Jeremiah or one of the prophets.”

15 “But what about you?” he asked. “Who do you say I am?”

16 Simon Peter answered, “You are the Messiah, the Son of the living God.”

17 Jesus replied, “Blessed are you, Simon son of Jonah, for this was not revealed to you by flesh and blood, but by my Father in heaven. 18 And I tell you that you are Peter, and on this rock I will build my church, and the gates of Hades will not overcome it. 19 I will give you the keys of the kingdom of heaven; whatever you bind on earth will be bound in heaven, and whatever you loose on earth will be loosed in heaven.” 20 Then he ordered his disciples not to tell anyone that he was the Messiah.

— Matthew 16: 13-20 (NIV)

In this passage, the word "you" is singular in the original Greek, despite the other apostles being present. A mirroring passage, which does not mention the keys, is also found later in chapter 18, within the context of verses 18-20:

18“Truly I tell you, whatever you bind on earth will be bound in heaven, and whatever you loose on earth will be loosed in heaven. 19“Again, truly I tell you that if two of you on earth agree about anything they ask for, it will be done for them by my Father in heaven. 20For where two or three gather in my name, there am I with them.”

— Matthew 18: 18-20 (NIV)

Here, the plural "you" is used.

== Day of Pentecost and message ==
Keys of the Kingdom on the flag of Vatican City

According to Acts of the Apostles, on the day of Pentecost, Peter, in the presence of the other 11 disciples, speaks a message to the Jews from all over the known world, metaphorically using the keys to open the kingdom, inviting hearers in, building the church. Up until this point it was only Jesus who spoke / preached to the disciples. Here we see Peter act on the commission given to him by Christ in Matthew 16;

14 Then Peter stood up with the Eleven, raised his voice and addressed the crowd: “Fellow Jews and all of you who live in Jerusalem, let me explain this to you; listen carefully to what I say.

— Acts 2: 14 (NIV)

Afterwards, Peter speaks a message explaining the completion of several prophecies, concluding with;

36 “Therefore let all Israel be assured of this: God has made this Jesus, whom you crucified, both Lord and Messiah.”

37 When the people heard this, they were cut to the heart and said to Peter and the other apostles, “Brothers, what shall we do?”

38 Peter replied, “Repent and be baptized, every one of you, in the name of Jesus Christ for the forgiveness of your sins. And you will receive the gift of the Holy Spirit.

39 The promise is for you and your children and for all who are far off—for all whom the Lord our God will call.

40 With many other words he warned them; and he pleaded with them, “Save yourselves from this corrupt generation.

41 Those who accepted his message were baptized, and about three thousand were added to their number that day.

— Acts 2: 36-41 (NIV)

== Islam ==
In contrast to the Christian belief expressed in Matthew 16:19, where Jesus declares that Peter holds the "keys of the kingdom of heaven" (Greek: κλεῖδα, kleîda; Syriac: ܩܠܺܝܕ݂ܶܐ, qəlīḏe), thereby granting the Church authority over admission to Paradise, the Qur'an asserts that the keys of the heavens and earth belong to God alone (39:63; 42:12), affirming that only God possesses the power to grant or withhold entry to Paradise. Notably, in these verses the Qur'an employs the rare term maqālīd (مَقَالِيد) for "keys," rather than the more common mafātīḥ, and this word appears exclusively in connection with "heaven and earth." The term maqālīd is believed to ultimately derive from Aramaic אַקְלִידָא / ܐܩܠܝܕܐ (ʾaqlīdā, "key"), itself borrowed from Ancient Greek κλεῖδα (kleîda), subtly echoing the phrasing of Matthew 16:19 while simultaneously emphasizing that authority over the gates of Paradise, and, by extension, over all of creation, resides solely with God in the Islamic faith.

== See also ==
- Binding and loosing
- Keys of Heaven
- Matthew 16
- Power of the Keys
- Primacy of Peter
