= Gate of Heaven Cemetery (disambiguation) =

Gate of Heaven Cemetery may refer to:

- Gate of Heaven Cemetery (Silver Spring, Maryland)
- Gate of Heaven Cemetery (East Hanover, New Jersey)
- Gate of Heaven Cemetery (Hawthorne, New York)
