= Pearly Gatecrashers =

The Pearly Gatecrashers
- Origin: Sydney, New South Wales, Australia
- Genres: Twee Pop, Indie Pop, Jangle Pop
- Years active: 1991-1997, 2008
- Past members: Lenore Betteridge; Tim Butt

The Pearly Gatecrashers were a twee pop band from Sydney, Australia, primarily composed of husband-wife duo Lenore Betteridge and Tim Butt.

Their success occurred primarily in Asian markets, especially in Japan while they were signed to Shock Records. The guitarist and songwriter went on to form Blandville. The band met in 2008 to compile the album "But Wait There's More" a collection of songs recorded over the last decade.

== Discography ==
- Age of Innocence EP 7" (Zero Hour Records 1992)
- New, Fluffy, Delicious! CD (Zero Hour Records 1993)
1. "Age of Innocence"
2. "Fly"
3. "Good Time"
4. "Happiest Days"
5. "I Really Suffered"
6. "I'm Dreaming"
7. "In the Summer"
8. "Run"
9. "Tequila Moon"
- Handy Hints EP 7" (Elefant Records autumn 1994) ER-125
- Rum with Pepsi CD (Concubine Records 1995) SINGLE 002
- Popsuey CD (King Records 1996)

- It was only edited in Japan

- "But Wait There's More" (download only) - (iTunes 2008)
