= Matthew 16 =

- ← chapter 15 chapter 17 →
- Book: Gospel of Matthew
- Category: Gospel
- Christian Bible part: New Testament
- Order in the Christian part: 1

Matthew 16 is the sixteenth chapter in the Gospel of Matthew in the New Testament section of the Christian Bible. Jesus begins a journey to Jerusalem from the vicinity of Caesarea Philippi, near the southwestern base of Mount Hermon. Verse 24 speaks of his disciples "following him".

The narrative can be divided into the following subsections:

- No sign except the Sign of Jonah (16:1–4)
- The yeast of the Pharisees and Sadducees (16:5–12)
- Peter's confession (16:13–20)
- Jesus predicts his death (16:21–26)
- Return of the Son of Man (16:27–28)

== Text ==
The original text was written in Koine Greek. This chapter is divided into 28 verses.

=== Textual witnesses ===
Some early manuscripts containing the text of this chapter are:

- Codex Vaticanus (325–350)
- Codex Sinaiticus (330–360)
- Codex Bezae (c. 400)
- Codex Washingtonianus (c. 400)
- Codex Ephraemi Rescriptus (c. 450)
- Codex Purpureus Rossanensis (6th century)
- Codex Petropolitanus Purpureus (6th century; extant verses 1–6)
- Codex Sinopensis (6th century; extant verses 1–18)

== Locations ==
Matthew 15 ends with Jesus sending the multitude of his followers away and He and his disciples sail to Magdala (or Magadan) on the western shore of the Sea of Galilee. In Matthew 16:1 the Pharisees and Sadducees come to him, presumably in the same location.

Matthew 16:5 refers again to travel to "the other side", and verses 16:13–20 are set "in the region of Caesarea Philippi".

The "other side" of the lake would have been the eastern side. In regard to the statement in verse 5 that they had forgotten to take bread, Joseph Benson suggests that they should have obtained bread before embarking on the western side, noting that in Mark's parallel passage (Mark 8:14) they had only one loaf with them, whereas Henry Alford and Heinrich Meyer both argue that they should have obtained more supplies when they arrived on the eastern side, because they had a further journey in mind.

Caesarea Philippi is the furthest point north referred to in Matthew's Gospel, and marks the turning point from which Jesus and his disciples will travel south to Jerusalem.

== Pharisees and Sadducees (16:1–12) ==
=== Verse 1 ===
The Pharisees also with the Sadducees came, and tempting desired him that he would shew them a sign from heaven.

Following earlier references to the Pharisees' objections to Jesus' teaching (see Matthew 12:22–32), further opposition is now put forward by a coalition of Pharisees and Sadducees, whose theological views and policies were markedly different from each other, but who were forced to co-operate as members of Sanhedrin, the Jewish supreme court. Biblical commentator Dale Allison describes the coalition as an "unlikely" one, as do Wilhelm de Wette, David Strauss, Weiss and Jan Hendrik Scholten. Arthur Carr suggests that the formation of this coalition "can only be accounted for by the uniting influence of a strong common hostility against Jesus". Theologian John Gill suggests that "these were Galilean Sadducees and Pharisees, of whom mention is made in the Misna", and distinct from the scribes and Pharisees who were from Jerusalem, mentioned in Matthew 15:1. Gill notes that Obadiah of Bertinoro, a 15th-century Italian rabbi who wrote a popular commentary on the Mishnah, also made reference to "Galilean Sadducees".

An earlier request for a sign was recorded in Matthew 12:38. Meyer suggests that there were two distinct occasions when such signs were requested, once when Jesus was asked to provide a sign, and once when a sign is requested "from heaven".

=== Verses 2–3 ===
^{2} He answered and said to them,

"When it is evening you say, 'It will be fair weather, for the sky is red';
^{3} and in the morning, 'It will be foul weather today, for the sky is red and threatening.'
Hypocrites! You know how to discern the face of the sky, but you cannot discern the signs of the times."

Allison notes that, had he wanted to do so, Jesus could have provided the "spectacular sign" they were requesting: in Matthew 26:53, Jesus reminds his followers, "do you think that I cannot now pray to My Father, and He will provide Me with more than twelve legions of angels?".

=== Verse 5 ===
Now when His disciples had come to the other side, they had forgotten to take bread.

Meyer includes Jesus in this journey although he is not mentioned, only the disciples. He reads verse 6 as conclusive to this effect.

=== Verse 6 ===
Then Jesus said to them, "Take heed and beware of the leaven of the Pharisees and the Sadducees".

"Leaven" means "teaching" or "doctrine".

== Peter's confession (16:13–20) ==
This pericope is considered the climax of the first part of the Gospel of Matthew, when Peter received a revelation from God telling him that Jesus is the Messiah, the Son of God. Allison argues that "the primary function of this passage is to record the establishment of a new community, one which will acknowledge Jesus' true identity and thereby become the focus of God's activity in history".

=== Verse 13 ===
When Jesus came into the region of Caesarea Philippi, He asked His disciples, saying, “Who do men say that I, the Son of Man, am?

- "Region" (Ancient Greek: μέρη, merē, the plural form of meros, "part, portion, share"): The King James Version refers to the "coasts" of Caesarea Philippi, although Caesarea Philippi is not in the vicinity of a sea: the sense is one of "borders" or "regions". The regions of Caesarea Philippi are called "the northern coasts of the land of Israel", marking "the most northerly point" reached by Jesus Christ in his ministry.

The Textus Receptus has Greek: τινα με λεγουσιν, tina me legousin, but the με is omitted by Westcott-Hort. Hence translations vary as to whether Jesus' question is set out in the first person or third person:

Who do men say that I, the Son of Man, am? – New King James Version
Who do people say I am? – Easy-to-Read Version
Who do people say that the Son of Man is? – American Standard Version, NABRE, Revised Standard Version

=== Verse 14 ===
So they said, "Some say John the Baptist, some Elijah, and others Jeremiah or one of the prophets".

The popular consensus is that Jesus is a prophet: all the forerunners mentioned were prophets.

=== Verse 16 ===
Simon Peter answered and said, "You are the Christ, the Son of the living God."

This answer from Peter combined a traditional Jewish title of "Messiah" (Greek: Christos, "Christ") meaning "anointed" (which is a royal title), with a Greek title "Son of ... God" for a ruler or divine leader (a favorite of the first Roman Emperor Augustus, among others), which is also another Hebrew royal title (see Psalm 2:7).

=== Verse 18 ===
And I also say to you that you are Peter, and on this rock I will build My church, and the gates of Hades shall not prevail against it.

The word used in the original Greek texts which has been translated as "church" is "ἐκκλησίαν" (transliterated: "ekklēsian") which does not mean a place or building for worship but a chosen community.

- "Shall...prevail against": or "be victorious", from the Greek word κατισχύσουσιν, katischysousin.

Pope Francis notes that Jesus uses the word 'Church' here, for the first time: "he does so expressing all His love for the new Covenant community which He defines as 'My Church'".

=== Verse 19 ===
"And I will give you the keys of the kingdom of heaven, and whatever you bind on earth will be bound in heaven, and whatever you loose on earth will be loosed in heaven."

- "Will be bound... will be loosed": or "will have been bound . . . will have been loosed".

== Death and glory (16:21–28) ==
Still at the location near Caesarea Philippi, the narrative follows Peter's confession with a decisive new phase of Jesus' ministry, with Jerusalem as the next geographical focus. Verse 21 states that Jesus "must go to Jerusalem", but this journey does not properly begin until Matthew 19:1.

=== Verse 22 ===
And Peter took him aside and began to rebuke him, saying, "Far be it from you, Lord! This shall never happen to you."

The English Standard Version notes that Peter's words can also be read as "[May God be] merciful to you, Lord!".

== See also ==
- Caesarea Philippi
- Jonah
- Simon Peter
- Related Bible parts: Psalm 2, Jonah 1, Mark 8, Luke 9

== Sources ==
- Coogan, Michael David (2007). Coogan, Michael David; Brettler, Marc Zvi; Newsom, Carol Ann; Perkins, Pheme (eds.). The New Oxford Annotated Bible with the Apocryphal/Deuterocanonical Books: New Revised Standard Version, Issue 48 (Augmented 3rd ed.). Oxford University Press. ISBN 9780195288810.
- France, R. T. (1994). "Matthew". In Carson, D. A.; France, R. T.; Motyer, J. A.; Wenham, G. J. (eds.). New Bible Commentary: 21st Century Edition (4, illustrated, reprint, revised ed.). Inter-Varsity Press. pp. 904–945. ISBN 9780851106489.
