= Pearly gates =

Entrance to Heaven in Christianity

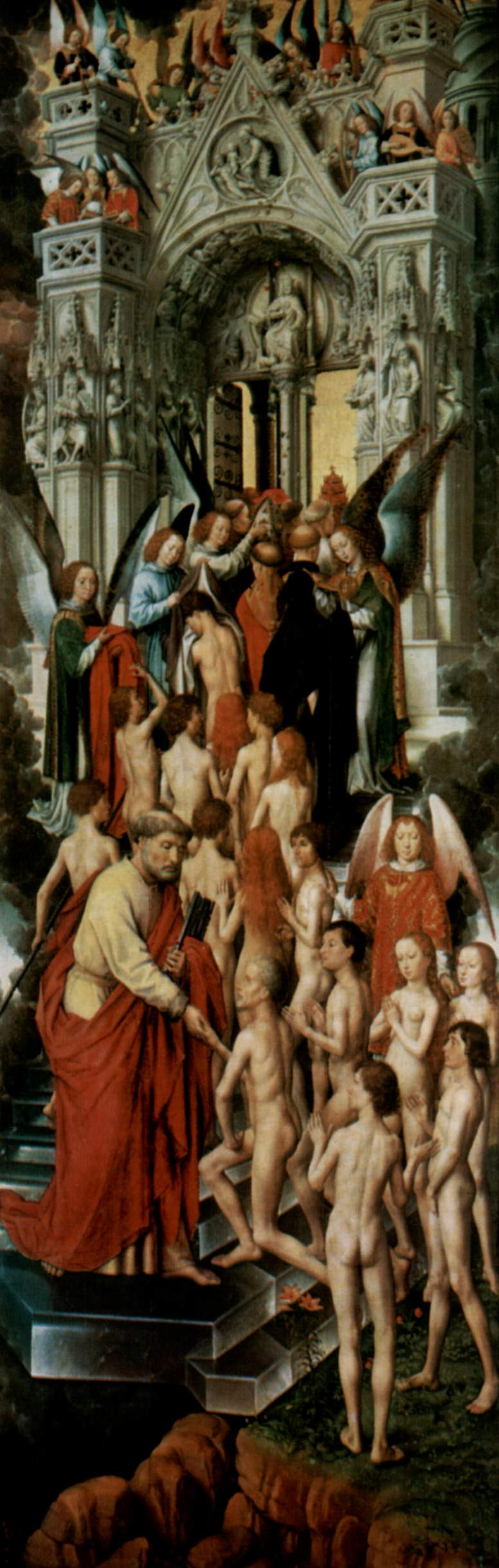
The Blessed at the gate to heaven with St. Peter (1467–1471) by Hans Memling

Pearly gates is an informal name for the gateway to Heaven according to some Christian denominations. It is inspired by the description of the New Jerusalem in Revelation 21:21: "The twelve gates were twelve pearls, each gate made of a single pearl."

The image of the gates in popular culture is a set of large gold, white, or wrought-iron gates in the clouds, guarded by Saint Peter (the keeper of the "keys to the kingdom"). Those not fit to enter heaven are denied entrance at the gates, and descend into Hell. In some versions of this imagery, Peter looks up the deceased's name in a book, before opening the gate.

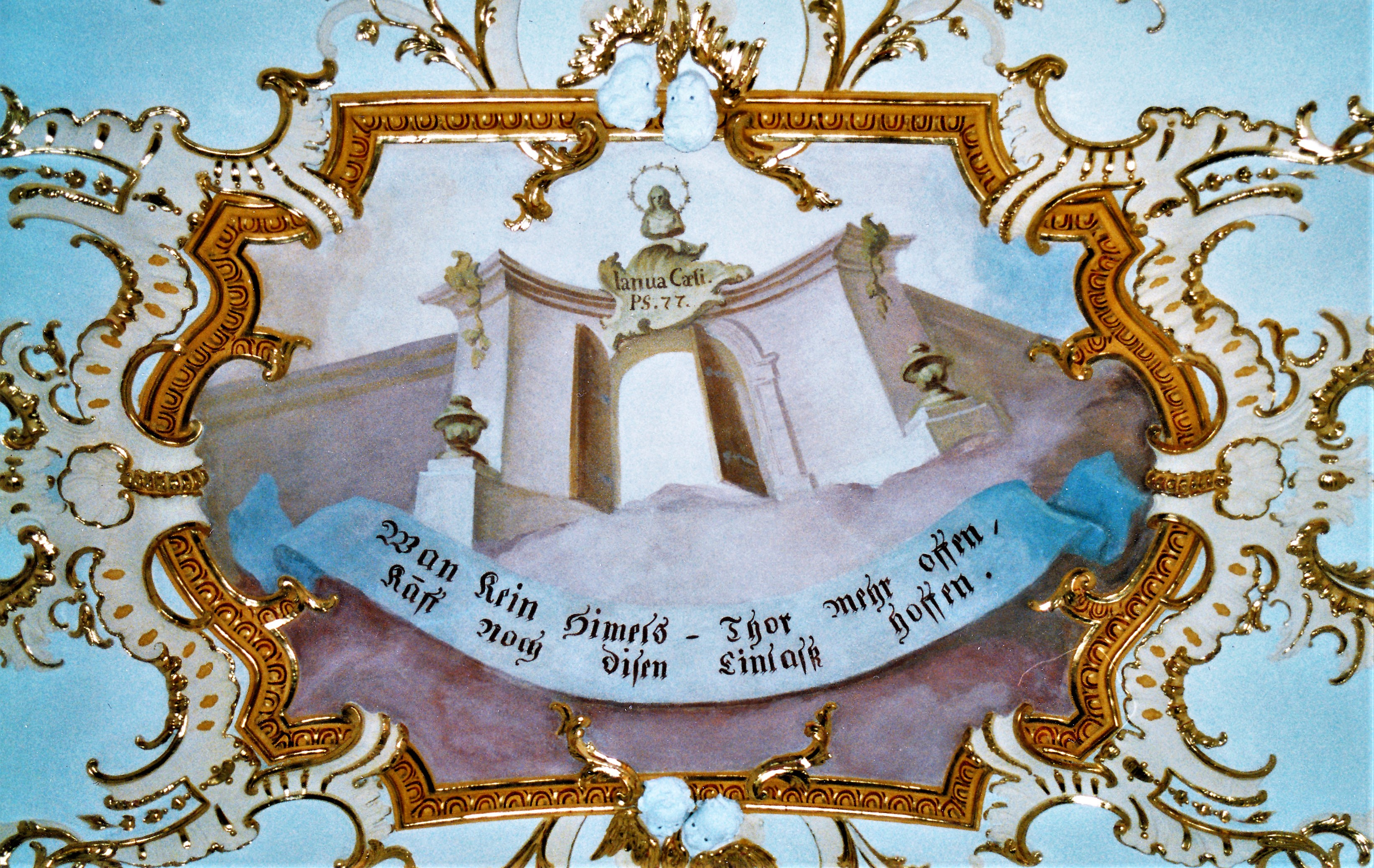
Johann Baptist Zimmermann (1680-1758): Ianua coeli

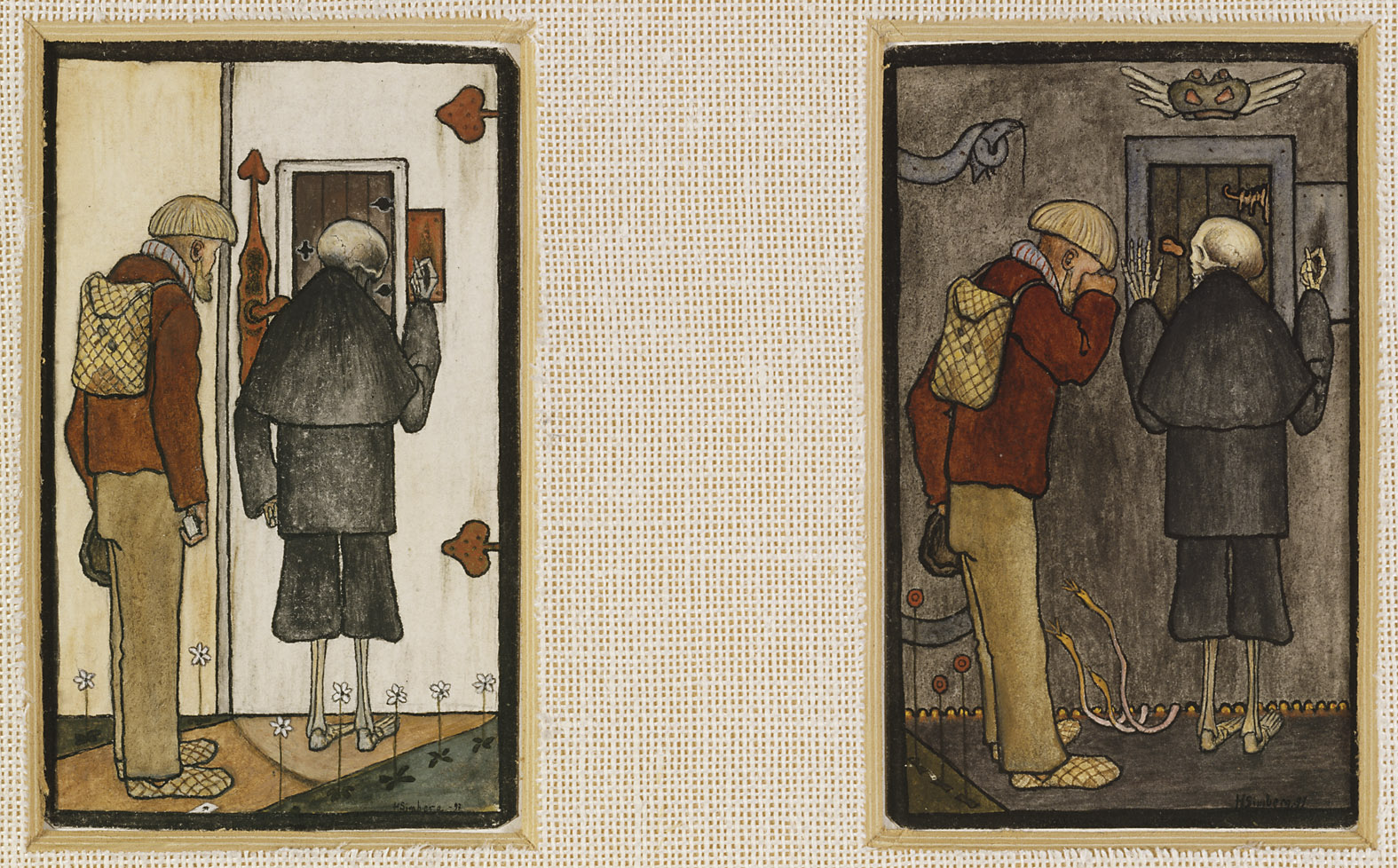
Hugo Simberg: The Peasant and Death at the Gates of Heaven and Hell (1897)

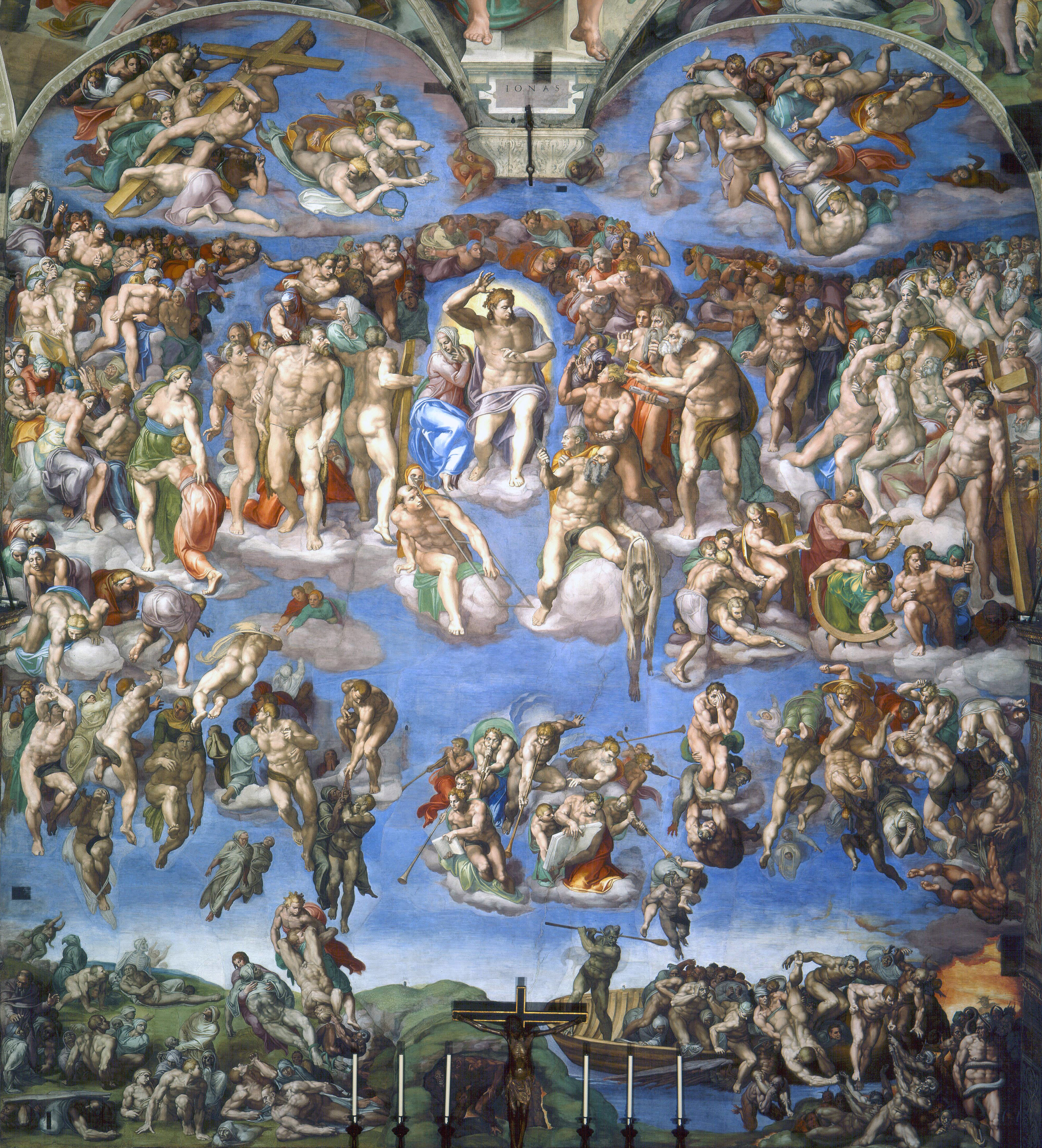
Fresco
"The Last Judgement" by Michelangelo (16th century)
