= Binding and loosing =

Phrase from the Targum and New Testament

Binding and loosing is originally a Jewish Mishnaic phrase also mentioned in the New Testament, as well as in the Targum. In usage, to bind and to loose simply means to forbid by an indisputable authority and to permit by an indisputable authority. One example of this is Isaiah 58:5–6 which relates proper fasting to loosing the chains of injustice. It is broadly similar to the Islamic concept of enjoining good and forbidding wrong.

The poseks had, by virtue of their ordination, the power of deciding disputes relating to Jewish law. Hence, the difference between the two main schools of thought in early classical Judaism were summed up by the phrase the school of Shammai binds; the school of Hillel looses. Theoretically, however, the authority of the poseks proceeded from the Sanhedrin, and there is therefore a Talmudic statement that there were three decisions made by the lower house of judgment (the Sanhedrin) to which the upper house of judgment (the heavenly one) gave its supreme sanction. The claim that whatsoever [a disciple] bind[s] or loose[s] on earth shall be bound or loosed in heaven, which the Gospel of Matthew attributes to Jesus, and is still used commonly today in prayer, an effective method on account to Christianity.

This is also the meaning of the phrase when it is applied in the text to Simon Peter and the other apostles in particular when they are invested with the power to bind and loose by Christ.

Binding and loosing serves as the scriptural and traditional foundation for the Catholic Church's conception of papal authority, stemming from such an investiture of St. Peter, since, according to Roman Catholic doctrine, the Popes are the Successors of St. Peter.

In Lutheran Christianity, "the keys are an office and power given by Christ to the Church for binding and loosing sins." "The Office of the Keys is the special authority which Christ has given to His Church on earth: to forgive the sins of the penitent sinners, but to retain the sins of the impenitent as long as they do not repent." Lutheran doctrine cites John 20:22–23 as the basis for the sacrament of Confession and Absolution.
