= Clipping the church =

Ancient English custom at churches

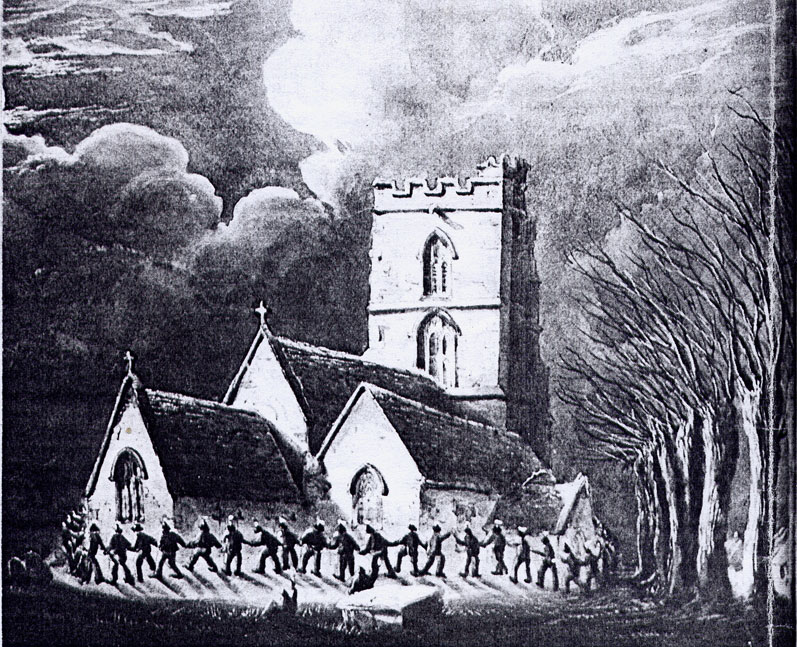
Clipping the church at Church of St Lawrence, Rode. Painting by W. W. Wheatley in 1848

Clipping the church is an ancient custom that is traditionally held in England on Easter Monday or Shrove Tuesday or a date relevant to the Saint associated with the church. The word "clipping" is Anglo-Saxon in origin, and is derived from the word "clyppan", meaning "embrace" or "clasp". Clipping the church involves either the church congregation or local children holding hands in an inward-facing ring around the church, and can then be reversed to an outward-facing ring if a prayer for the wider world beyond the parish is said. Once the circle is completed onlookers will often cheer and sometimes hymns are sung. Often there is dancing. Following the ceremony a sermon is delivered in the church and there are sometimes refreshments. Christians adopted this tradition to show their love for their church and the surrounding people. Currently, there are only a few churches left in England that hold this ceremony, and all of these appear to honour it on a different day.

== History ==
Little is known about the history of clipping. It was rumored to have origins in some type of Pagan custom, but nothing has been substantiated. Even allowing for adaptation, what is known is clearly a Christian tradition. The earliest known written mention of it dates from 1825 in a description of the ceremony given by "L.S." in The Every-day Book, a recounted memory of his childhood. Because of this reference, it is thought that the ceremony might have undergone a revival in the early 19th century. It was a custom in several parishes in the Midlands, having died out in various places later in the 19th century. But it was still performed widely across the country, from Yorkshire to Wiltshire and Derbyshire, as well as Birmingham, Somerset and Shropshire.

== Revival and current practice ==
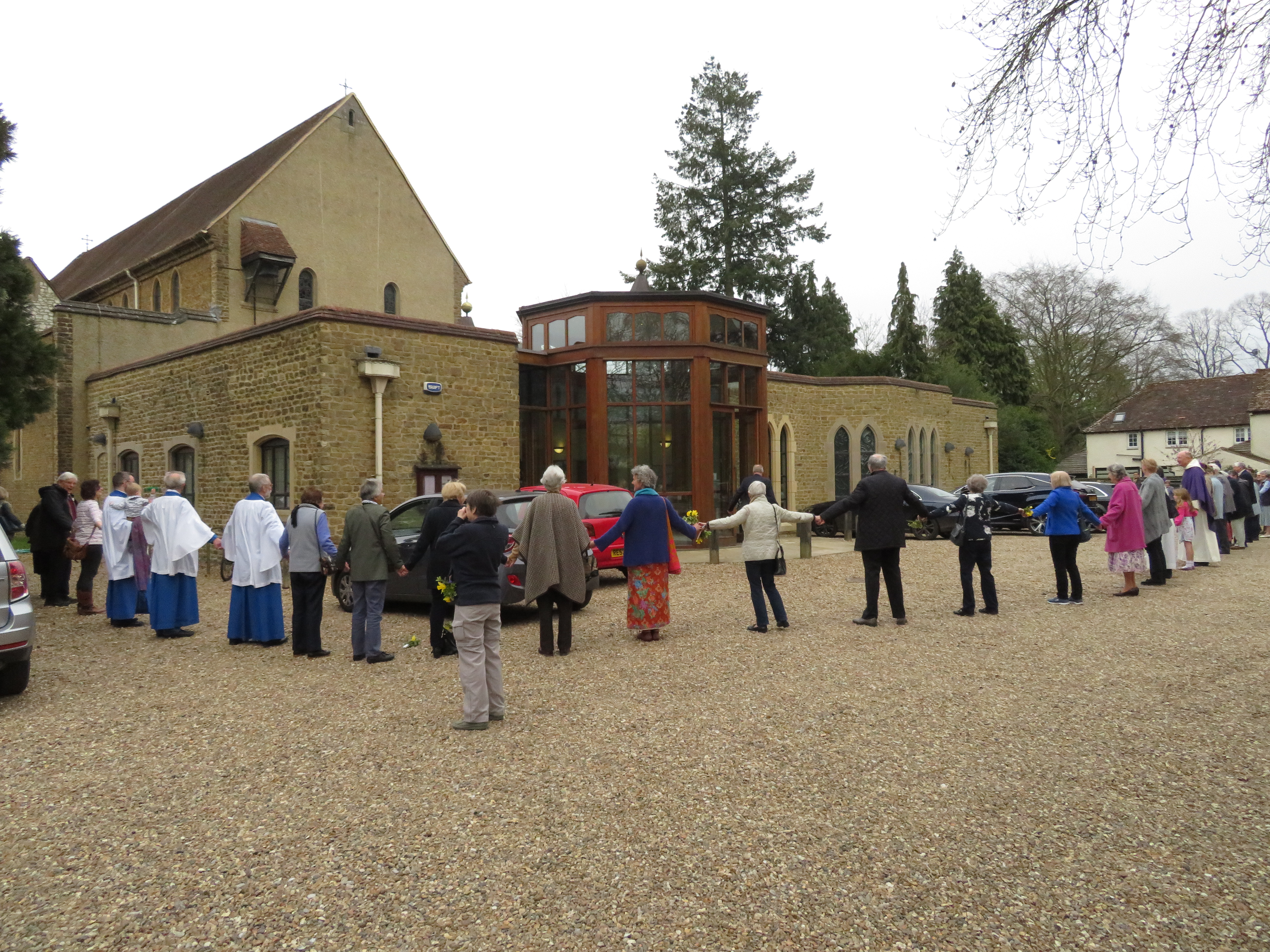
Clipping the church at St Thomas-on-The Bourne, Farnham, Surrey on Mothering Sunday 2019

It was revived at St. Peter's Church, Edgmond, Shropshire in 1867, and continues there to the present day. St. Mary's Church in Painswick in Gloucestershire is one of a few other churches that perform this custom, on a Shrove Tuesday, and today it is performed by children. Other churches that hold similar ceremonies include Burbage Parish Church, St Mary's Church, Wirksworth, and Guiseley Parish Church.

=== Tankersley, South Yorkshire ===
At St Peter's Church in Tankersley, Barnsley in the diocese of Sheffield it has continued annually since 1926. The service of Clyppings is held annually on the second Sunday following St Peter's Day (29 June). When the new ‘Calendar’ was changed, by omitting 11 days, the residents of Tankersley neglected (or refused) to change the day of their festival. Another important fact was that in the year of 1800, it was not considered a leap year and this interjected another day.

At Tankersley, there is a service held in the parish church followed by the congregation moving outside to form a ring around the church. They sing the hymn, "We Love thy Place O God", accompanied by a trumpet. A prayer is then said with the congregation facing the church and then the congregation all face outwards to the world and pray for the wider community and the world.

=== Wissett, Suffolk ===
St Andrew's Church, Wissett have revived the tradition of Clipping since about 1998. When the church is fully embraced, people from Wissett and the wider benefice sing Lord of the Dance. The church is clipped annually on Shrove Tuesday and this is followed by a serving of pancakes and fillings in the village hall. It is an ecumenical occasion and involves musical accompaniment from a Salvation Army band.

=== Rode, Somerset ===
At the Church of St Lawrence at Rode, Somerset the circle face inwards dancing left and right before rushing towards the church with a cheer.

=== Wilden, Worcestershire ===
The Church of All Saints at Wilden, Worcestershire adopted the practice in 2018. Clypping is undertaken with the circle facing inwards. The church bell rings three times and the circle dances to the left, then the bell rings three times more and the circle dances to the right. The bell rings a final three times and the circle cries 'God bless Wilden'.

=== The Bourne, Surrey ===
At St Thomas-on-The Bourne church in The Bourne parish of Farnham, Surrey, clypping of the "mother church" takes place on Mothering Sunday.
