= R v Hay =

English robbery trial concerning priest-penitent privilege

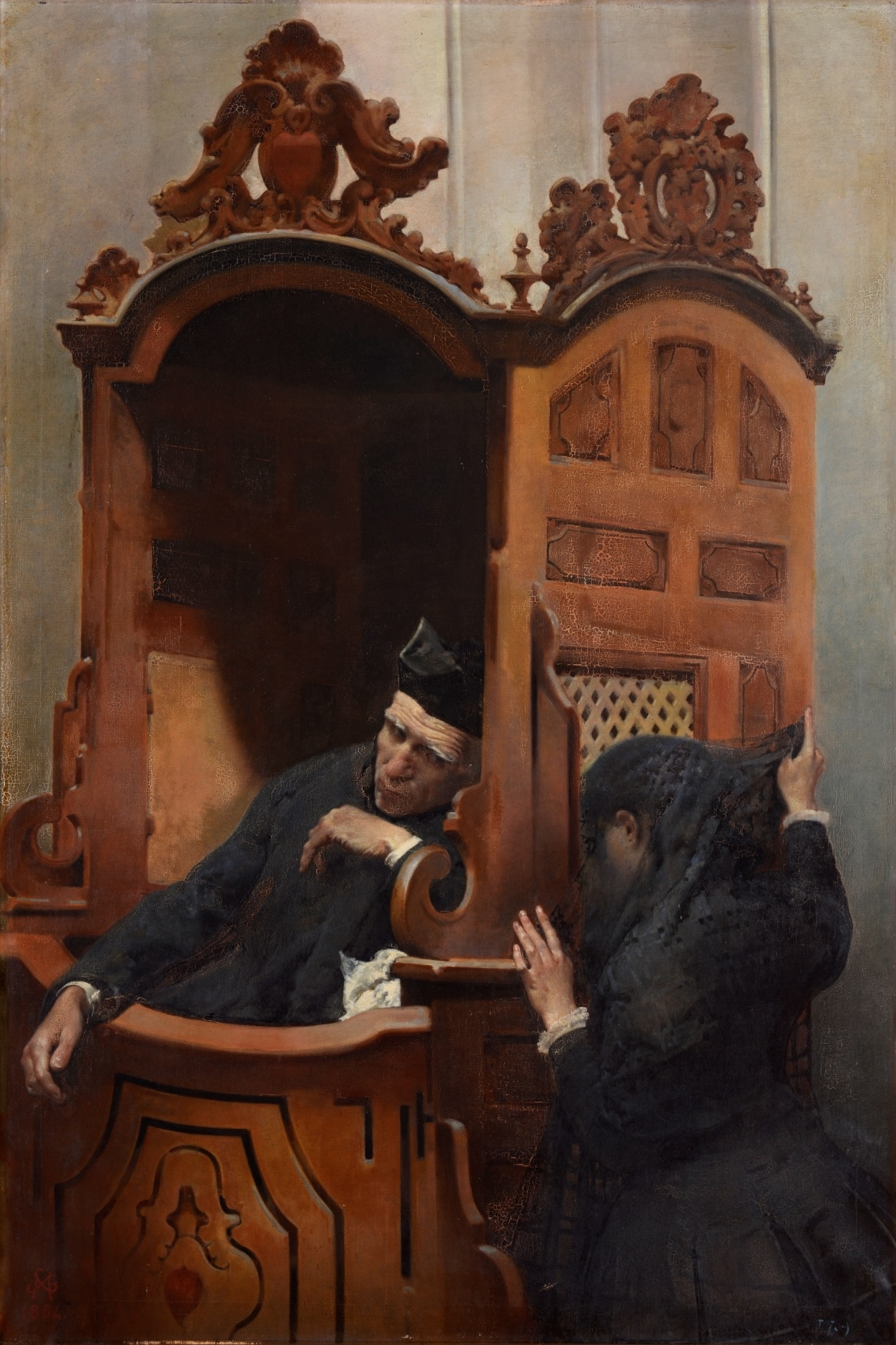
- A confession booth (confessional)
- Court: Her Majesty's Justices at Durham assizes (sittings away from London)
- Full case name: Regina (the Crown) versus Hay
- Decided: 1860
- Citations: 2 Foster and Finlaison 4

Case history
- Prior action: None
- Subsequent action: None

Court membership
- Judge sitting: Mr Justice Hill

Case opinions
- Decision by: Jury directed by judge as to legal precedent and procedure

Keywords
- confession to priest; extent of priest–penitent privilege; obligation to disclose giver of item; avoiding question of whether obligation to disclose verbal confession to court; contempt of court; Catholic doctrine of law of the seal of confession

R v Hay (1860) was an English robbery trial argued by R. S. Nolan as suggesting a narrow priest–peninent privilege exists in England and Wales, such that the court did not require the priest to disclose any conversation which may have occurred. However, on the facts of the case, it imprisoned him for not stating who handed a stolen item to him by way of restitution to the victim of a robbery, the priest not having denied that he knew the identity of the person who handed it to him.

== Facts ==
The case was tried before Mr Justice Hill at Durham Assizes. The complainant alleged that he had been robbed of his watch by the defendant and another man. A police inspector then received the watch from Father Kelly, a priest in the neighbourhood, upon his calling at the presbytery. Kelly was summoned as a witness by the prosecutor, and as the oath was about to be administered to him he objected to its form, not, he explained, to that part of it which required him to tell the truth and nothing but the truth, "but as a minister of the Catholic Church", he said, "I object to that part which states that I shall tell the whole truth". The judge answered him: "The meaning of the oath is this: it is the whole truth touching the trial which you are asked: which you legitimately, according to law, can be asked. If anything is asked of you in the witness box which the law says ought not to be asked, for instance, if you are asked a question the answer to which might criminate yourself, you would be entitled to say, 'I object to answer that question'". The judge told him that he must be sworn. He advised he had been handed the watch, which was professedly stolen, Christmas day.

When asked by counsel from whom he had received the watch, Kelly replied: "I received it in connexion with the confessional". The judge said: "You are not asked at present to disclose anything stated to you in the confessional: you are asked a simple fact: from whom did you receive that watch which you gave to the policeman?" Kelly protested: "The reply to a question would implicate the person who gave me the watch, therefore I cannot answer it. If I answered it my suspension for life would be a necessary consequence. I should be violating the laws of the Church as well as the natural laws". The judge said: "On the ground that I have stated to you, you are not asked to disclose anything that a penitent may have said to you in the confessional. That you are not asked to disclose: but you are asked to disclose from whom you received the stolen property on the 25th December last. Do you answer or do you not?" Kelly replied: "I really cannot, my Lord". He was imprisoned forthwith for contempt of court.

The Catholic Encyclopedia contends that it may be fairly deduced from Mr Justice Hill's words that he would not have required Kelly to disclose any statement which had been made to him in the confessional, and, in this sense, his words may be said to give some support to the Catholic claim for privilege for sacramental confession. The Encyclopedia further observes, "But we need not wonder that he was not ready to extend the protection to the act of restitution, though, even in the eyes of non-Catholics, it ought, in all logic, to have been entitled to the same secrecy, in view of the circumstances under which, obviously, it was made".

== See also ==
- English criminal law
- Constance Kent case, following this case's jurisprudence.

== Sources ==
- R. S. Nolan (1913). "Law of the Seal of Confession" . In Herbermann, Charles (ed.). Catholic Encyclopedia. New York: Robert Appleton Company.
