= Jack Whicher =

British police detective

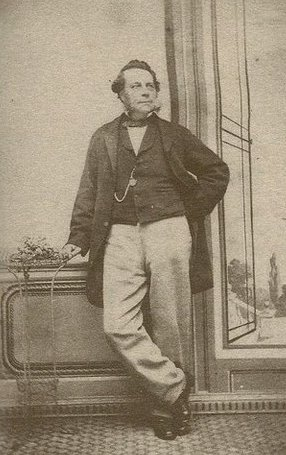
- Born: Johnathan Whicher; 1 October 1814; Camberwell, London, United Kingdom
- Died: 29 June 1881 (aged 66); Lavender Hill, London, United Kingdom
- Resting place: Camberwell Old Cemetery
- Occupation: Detective
- Known for: Notable police detective
- Height: 5 ft 8 in (173 cm)
- Spouse(s): Elizabeth Harding, Charlotte Piper

Detective Inspector Jonathan Whicher (1 October 1814 – 29 June 1881) was an English police detective. He was one of the original eight members of London's newly formed Detective Branch, which was established at Scotland Yard in 1842. During his career, Whicher earned a reputation among the finest in Europe.

In 1860, he was involved in investigating the Constance Kent murder case, which was the subject of Kate Summerscale's 2008 book The Suspicions of Mr Whicher, as well as the film of the same name. He was one of the inspirations for Charles Dickens’s Inspector Bucket, Colin Dexter’s Inspector Morse, Wilkie Collins's Sergeant Cuff and R. D. Wingfield's Jack Frost, among other fictional detectives.

== Life ==
=== Early years ===
Whicher was born in 1814 in Camberwell, London, the son of Rebecca and Richard Whicher, a gardener. He was baptised on 23 October 1814 at the church of St Giles in Camberwell. After working as a labourer he passed the physical and literacy tests and joined the Metropolitan Police on 18 September 1837 as a police constable with the number E47 (Holborn Division). Whicher was 5' 8" tall, with brown hair, pale skin and blue eyes. He married Elizabeth Harding (born 1818), and they had a son, Jonathan Whicher (born 1838), who died young. By 1841 he was living in a police dormitory at a stationhouse in Gray's Inn Lane in St Pancras. In August 1842 he and seven other men joined the newly formed Detective Branch at Scotland Yard. Whicher received the new number A27 (Whitehall Division) and was promoted to detective sergeant shortly after. Whicher was reportedly described by a colleague as the "prince of detectives". Charles Dickens, who met him, described him as "shorter and thicker-set" than his fellow officers, marked with smallpox scars and possessed of "a reserved and thoughtful air, as if he were engaged in deep arithmetical calculations". William Henry Wills, Dickens's deputy editor at Household Words magazine, saw Whicher involved in police work in 1850 and described him as a "man of mystery".

In May 1851 Whicher was accused of entrapment when he and Inspector Lund saw John Tyler, a convict who had been transported to Australia as a criminal and had recently returned, in Trafalgar Square. Whicher and Lund watched Tyler meet William Cauty, another known criminal, and sit with him on a bench in The Mall opposite the London and Westminster Bank in St James's Square. Whicher and Lund watched the two as they returned to the same bench every day for six weeks and watched the bank. Eventually, on 28 June 1851 they caught the two red-handed as they ran from the bank having robbed it. The Times criticised the police for allowing the crime to take place rather than preventing it. Whicher also pursued criminals who counterfeited coins, forged signatures on cheques and money orders, as well as pickpockets and conmen.

In 1854 Whicher was involved in the capture of the valet who stole ten pictures including the 'Virgin and Child' by Leonardo da Vinci (then valued at £4,000) from the home of the Earl of Suffolk near Malmesbury. The valet and his accomplices were unable to sell the pictures and they were discovered under one of the arches of Blackfriars Bridge. Whicher was promoted to detective inspector in 1856.

When Italian revolutionaries organised by Felice Orsini tried to assassinate Napoleon III in 1858 in Paris, Whicher took part in the hunt to track them down. In 1859 he investigated when the Reverend James Bonwell, the married rector of St Philip the Apostle in Stepney and his lover Miss Lizzie Yorath, a clergyman's daughter, were charged with murdering their illegitimate son. Bonwell had paid an undertaker 18 shillings to bury the dead child secretly in a coffin with a deceased stranger. The couple were found not guilty of murder but were censured by the jury, and in 1860 Archibald Tait, the Bishop of London, sued Bonwell for misconduct. In early 1860 Whicher caught Emily Lawrence and James Pearce, who had stolen £12,000 worth of jewellery from jewellers' shops in Paris by examining valuable items on trays and then palming them.

=== The Murder at Road Hill House ===
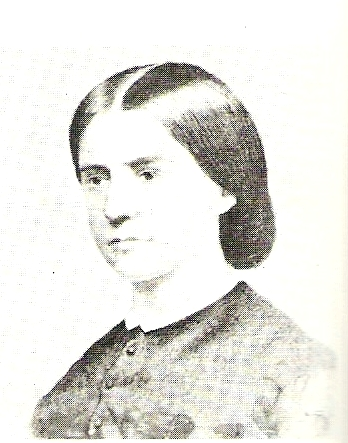
Constance Kent in 1860

Detective Inspector Jack Whicher's fame had spread, and he was at the height of his powers when in July 1860 he was sent by Scotland Yard to assist the local police in the small village of Rode (then in Wiltshire) in investigating the murder of 3-year-old Francis Saville Kent. By this time Whicher had already solved several notorious crimes and had gained a reputation for being able to solve the most difficult cases. Francis Saville Kent had been taken from his nursemaid Elizabeth Gough's bedroom during the night of Friday 29 June 1860 and his body was found the next morning dumped in an outside privy used by the servants in the garden of his family's house. His throat had been cut, among other injuries.

Local Police Superintendent Foley believed that the nursemaid, Elizabeth Gough, who had responsibility for Francis Kent, who slept in her room, was involved in the murder. His theory was that she and a lover, possibly the child's father, had woken the child up and had killed him in order to silence him, at the same time opening a window to make it look as if an intruder had gained access to the house and had killed the child. During the early part of the investigation, a heavily bloodstained nightgown was found lodged in a chimney in the house. Superintendent Foley ordered that this should be replaced so that a watch could be kept on it, hoping that the murderer would return to destroy this crucial piece of evidence. This went wrong when the two constables ordered to watch over the nightgown were locked in the kitchen. Before they were released the nightgown had vanished. Foley was afraid that the incompetence of his officers might result in punishment for him and for them. As a result, he deliberately did not inform the authorities of the find and its subsequent disappearance.

Dissatisfied by the lack of progress of Superintendent Foley and his men, the local magistrates asked the Home Office for assistance from Scotland Yard without the agreement of the local chief constable, Captain Samuel Meredith R.N. It was only after a second request was received that Whicher, then the most senior and best known of the detectives at Scotland Yard, was sent.

Whicher concentrated his investigation on the missing nightgown belonging to 16-year-old Constance Kent, the murdered child's older half-sister from their father's first marriage; there was also circumstantial evidence against her. The magistrates ordered her arrest and gave Whicher seven days to prepare his case. Whicher then requested the assistance of a detective sergeant from Scotland Yard, becoming the first police inspector to make such a request. Her father Samuel Saville Kent (1801–1872) engaged the services of an experienced barrister to defend his daughter. Constance Kent was released on bail and the case against her was later dropped due to lack of evidence. The nightgown, a crucial piece of evidence, was never found, and Superintendent Foley never told Whicher about its original discovery. The national newspapers strongly supported the young Constance and were critical of Whicher. He returned to London where he was seen as a failure because he had failed to solve the case; thus his reputation was damaged and took some time to recover.

==== Constance Kent's confession ====
In April 1865 Constance Kent was prosecuted for the murder of her younger half-brother. She had made a statement confessing her guilt to an Anglo-Catholic clergyman, the Rev. Arthur Wagner, and she expressed to him her resolution to give herself up to justice. He assisted her in carrying out this resolution, and he gave evidence of this statement before the magistrates but he prefaced his evidence by a declaration that he must withhold any further information on the ground that it had been received under the seal of "sacramental confession". He was but lightly pressed by the magistrates, the fact of the matter being that the prisoner was not defending the charge.

The substance of the confession was that she had waited until the family and servants were asleep, had gone down to the drawing-room and opened the shutters and window, had then taken the child from his room wrapped in a blanket that she had taken from between sheet and counterpane in his cot (leaving both these undisturbed or readjusted), left the house and killed him in the privy with a razor stolen from her father. Her movements before the killing had been conducted with the child in her arms. It had been necessary to hide matches in the privy beforehand for a light to see by during the act of murder. The murder was not a spontaneous act, it seems, but one of revenge against the second Mrs Kent for her treatment of Constance's mother – and it was even suggested that Constance had, at certain times, been mentally unbalanced.

=== Later years ===
From August to October 1862 he and Superintendent Walker of A Division were in Warsaw at the request of the Russian Empire. and by May the following year he had temporarily retired from the Met due to ill-health. This became permanent on 18 March 1864, with the official reason for his early departure given as "congestion of the brain". The 1871 census records him as an "assistant superintendent of police", erroneously omitting the word "retired".

Following the death of his first wife, Whicher married Charlotte Piper (1812–1883) in 1866 at St Margaret's, Westminster. He had become a private detective by early 1867 and in that role was involved in the Tichborne case, discovering that the Claimant Arthur Orton had immediately visited his family in Wapping on his return to London in 1866. In the 1881 census he is listed as a retired police officer.

He died in 1881 at home at 2 Cumberland Villas, Lavender Hill, London and was buried in Camberwell Old Cemetery. In his will he left £1,569 2s 6d (equivalent to £180,000 in 2019 prices); among his executors was Chief Superintendent Adolphus Williamson.

== Media portrayals ==
- Robert Audley, the detective in Mary Elizabeth Braddon's 1862 novel Lady Audley's Secret is based on Whicher and the Constance Kent case.
- In John Dickson Carr's historical mystery novel Scandal at High Chimneys, Whicher, now working as a private detective, solves the mystery.
- In the series On Trial Whicher appeared in the episode "The Tichborne Claimant" which was broadcast on 1 February 1957.
- He is the main protagonist in Kate Summerscale's 2008 non-fiction work The Suspicions of Mr Whicher or The Murder at Road Hill House.
- In the 2011 television series The Suspicions of Mr Whicher (based on Summerscale's book) and its sequels, Whicher is played by Paddy Considine.
