= Priest–penitent privilege in England from the Reformation to the nineteenth century =

The doctrine of priest–penitent privilege does not apply in the UK. Before the Reformation, England was a Catholic country and the Seal of the Confessional had great authority in the English courts. However, the Reformation was followed by a period of, often fierce, persecution of Catholics.

== Reach of canon law ==
In the 1761 Codex Juris Ecclesiastici Anglicani, Edmund Gibson cites the Ecclesiastical Licences Act 1533 and states that, before the Reformation, canon law customarily held in England unless inimical to the law of the land. From this, the 1913 Catholic Encyclopedia argues that English civil law would have respected the secrecy of the seal of the confessional, despite the lack of direct evidence on the matter.

The question of jurisdiction over clerks transgressing ecclesiastical law was entirely in the hands of the Church. The "Report of the Ecclesiastical Courts Commission, 1883", to which we have already alluded, tells us that "ecclesiastical jurisdiction in its widest sense covered all the ground of ecclesiastical relations, persons, properties, rights and remedies: clergymen in all their relations". But the jurisdiction of the ecclesiastical courts extended even much further, including as it did the province of marriage, and that of probate coupled with the devolution of movable property in cases of intestacy. Within this latter province there would have been, perhaps, more than in any other province within the jurisdiction of any court, occasion for desiring to know something that might have transpired under the seal of confession. Pollock and Maitland's "History of the Laws of England" tells us that intestacy was regarded with an abhorrence somewhat akin to that with which a death without sacramental confession was regarded. This may probably be a considerable overstatement, but it serves to show that this province was, at least, as much calculated as any other to raise the question of the seal of confession.

Again, let us remember that in some districts, such as Durham and Chester, bishops exercised temporal jurisdiction. Even in the king's courts, as Lord Coke points out, often the judges were priests, before Innocent IV prohibited priests from acting as judges. Pollock and Maitland's History of the Laws of England gives us as a specimen date, that of 16 July 1195, on which there sat in the Court of King's Bench an archbishop, three bishops, and three archdeacons. The same book tells us that:

... it is by popish clergymen that our English common law is converted from a rude mass of customs into an articulate system, and when the 'popish clergymen' yielding at length to the pope's commands no longer sit as the principal justices of the king's court the golden age of the common law is over.

It is highly improbable that at a period when systematization of the common law was proceeding at the hands of "popish clergymen" a rule compelling the disclosure of confession would have grown up. Finally, it is worthy of some observation that there is not a single reported case, textbook or commentary, during the whole pre-Reformation period which contains any suggestion that the laws of evidence did not respect the seal of confession. These grounds seem sufficient to lead to the conclusion that before the Reformation the seal was regarded as sacred by the common law of England. Sir Robert Phillimore in his work on (Anglican) ecclesiastical law makes a definite statement to this effect.

The only recorded statute of the English Parliament which deals with the right of confession is the Privilege of Sanctuary Act 1315 (9 Edw. 2. Stat. 1. c. 10). The statute is called Articuli Cleri, and the part referred to deals with the rights of offenders who abjure the realm and, fleeing to a church for refuge, claim privilege of sanctuary. After stating that such persons are to be allowed to have the necessaries of life and that they are to be at liberty to go out of the church to relieve nature, the statute continues as follows: "Placet etiam Domino Regi, ut latrones vel appellatores quandocunque voluerint possint sacerdotibus sua facinora confiteri: sed caveant confessores ne erronice hujusmodi appellatores informent". This law, long obsolete, was repealed in 1863, and is translated in the collections of the Statutes (Statutes of the Realm, I, 173), and in Pickering's edition of "Statutes at Large" (Cambridge, 1782): "And the King's Pleasure is, that Thieves or Appellors (whensoever they will) may confess their Offences unto Priests: but let the Confessors beware that they do not erroneously inform such Appellors".

== Coke on privilege ==
Sir Edward Coke, the great common lawyer who was Lord Chief Justice of England under James I, says:

This branch extendeth only to thieves and approvers indited of felony, but extendeth not to high treasons: for if high treason be discovered to the confessor, he ought to discover it for the danger that thereupon dependeth to the king and the whole realme: therefore the branch declareth the common law, that the privilege of confession extendeth only to felonies ... for by the common law ... [A] man indited of high treason could not have the benefit of clergy nor any clergyman privilege of confession to conceale high treason

— 2nd Institute, c. X

The Catholic Encyclopedia contends that it is not quite clear from his comment, but it seems likely, that Coke has interpreted the concluding caution to the confessors as a recognition of the seal of confession, and, if so, it would seem that he has wrongly interpreted it, because the translation of the word informare as "to inform against" would appear to be incorrect. The correct interpretation of the clause, the Encyclopedia goes on to submit, would seem to be as one of warning to the confessors not to inform these offenders, when they are admitted to hear their confessions, of what is going on outside.

Hence the Encyclopedia observes that, except in so far as it shows that the right of freely confessing was reserved to these offenders, the statute, in its actual words, contains no declaration of the privilege of the seal of confession, going on to hold Coke's comment important as being a statement by him of the existence of the privilege at common law in respect of felonies. There appears to be no foundation, for the exclusion of it from cases of high treason other than Coke's own view as quoted, because the two cases which he cites in support of that view do not support it.

=== Randolf's case ===
The first of these cases is that of Friar John Randolf, cited from the Rolls of Parliament, 7 Henry V. Randolf was the confessor of Joanna of Navarre, widow of Henry IV who was accused of attempting to poison her stepson Henry V by witchcraft. The Catholic Encyclopedia observes that there is nothing in that record from which Coke's contention that the queen's conspiracy had been proved by the disclosure of her confession to Friar Randolf can be deduced. The words in the report are:

Tant p relation & confession d'une frere John Randolf de l'ordre des Freres Menours come p autres evidences creables.

The word "confession" is, the Catholic Encyclopedia contends, there used in its primary sense of an admission, the reports of the matter in Holinshed's Chronicles and in John Stow's Chronicle of England supporting such a view as they state that Randolf was imprisoned. Holinshed says that:

It was reported that he had conspired with the quaene by sorcerie and necromancie to destroie the King.

Stow says that Randolf had counselled the queen to her crime. Thus, again in the view of the Catholic Encyclopedia, when he was imprisoned on the charge of the conspiracy with the queen he confessed as much.

=== Garnet's case ===
The second case is one which occurred after the Reformation. It is the trial of the Jesuit, Henry Garnet, on the charge of conspiracy in the Gunpowder Plot. It is reported in the records of the state trials. There is not only no mention of any decision by the court that the privilege of confession did not extend to the concealment of high treason, but there is not even the faintest indication of any opinion to that effect by any member of the court. There was no question of the giving of evidence by a witness before a court of justice of matter revealed to him in confession. The issue being whether Garnet was a party to the conspiracy, the question of his cognizance and, if cognizant, of his non-disclosure of it was essential. It was not disputed that he had heard the particulars of the plot from Greenwell, one of the conspirators, but the defence was that he had heard them only in confession, though he had previously received a general indication of the plot from another of the conspirators, Catesby. Not only was the defence not rejected at once by the court as being had in law, but, to infer from the arguments put to the prisoner upon it by certain members of the court, it was treated with a seriousness which seems surprising in a post-Reformation period, and, especially, at a moment of such strong anti-Catholic feeling.

Lord Salisbury, a member of the court, asked Garnet if there must not be confession and contrition before the absolution, and, having received an affirmative answer, he observed to him that Greenwell had shown no penitence, or intention to desist. "Hereby", he said, "it appears that either Greenwell told you out of confession, and then there would be no secrecy: or, if it were in confession, he professed no penitency, and therefore you could not absolve him." He further said to him that after Greenwell had told him in particular what Catesby meant, and he then called to mind what Catesby had previously told him (Garnet) in general, he might have disclosed it out of his general knowledge from Catesby. He further asked him why, after Greenwell's confession, when Catesby wished to tell him the particulars, he had refused to hear him, to which Garnet answered that he was loth to hear any more. Sir Edward Coke, for the prosecution, addressed to the court six arguments on the subject, the first being that this particular confession was not sacramental, the fifth being that Garnet had learned of the conspiracy from Catesby extra confessionem, and the last being that "by the common law, howsoever it (the confession) were, it being a crimen l s majestatis, he ought to have disclosed it". There is no indication of any adoption by the court of this last proposition. The confession in question was only an item in the evidence brought forward. One infers from the report that the court were not satisfied with the defence, as a fact, of the confession, and, also, that they considered the charge to be proved from the other evidence.

In a paper on the law relating to confession in criminal cases by Charles Henry Hopwood, the writer admits the probability of the recognition of the seal before the Reformation. He says that Garnet's case even as cited by Lord Coke could hardly be in point, inasmuch as Garnet was not called as a witness in the Gunpowder treason trial, and that the obligation of the seal of confession, if put forward by Garnet at all, was only done so by way of his own defence that he was not a conspirator, but merely knew whatever he knew through hearing the confession of the others, and that Sir E. Coke appears almost to confess and avoid this plea by retorting that the confession was one of crime not yet executed. Sir Edward Coke in his commentary on the "Articuli Cleri", c. 10, interpreting the wording of it as he does, says that it declares the common law. His supporting this statement by the citation of a then recent case, together with his own argument, already mentioned, in that case, affords strong evidence that this great common lawyer was of opinion that even in his post-Reformation period the common law of England recognized the privilege of confession, except in the case of treason. If that is his view, as seems, at least, highly probable, it is profoundly interesting as the opinion of a very distinguished lawyer and a fierce champion of Protestantism.
