= Alexandra Roach =

Welsh actress (born 1987)

- Born: Alexandra Elizabeth Roach; 20 August 1987 (age 39); Ammanford, Carmarthenshire, Wales
- Education: Royal Academy of Dramatic Art (B.A., 2010)
- Occupation: Actress
- Years active: 2003–present
- Spouse: Jack Scales (m. 2018)
- Children: 1

Alexandra Elizabeth Roach (born 20 August 1987) is a Welsh actress best known for her roles as Becky in Utopia and DS Joy Freers in No Offence. She has also made appearances in series including Being Human, Inside No. 9, Black Mirror and Killing Eve.

== Life and career ==
Roach was born in Ammanford, Carmarthenshire, Wales. A number of her relatives, including her father Jeff (who went on to work for the Welsh Rugby Union), her brother and her sister, have been part of the police force at one point. A fluent Welsh speaker, Roach appeared in long-running television soap Pobol y Cwm in her early teens and won Best Juvenile Actor in a Soap at the Children in Entertainment Awards. After leaving the series in 2005, she spent time with the National Youth Theatre of Wales before going on to the Royal Academy of Dramatic Art.

She has described how her Welsh accent counted against her in an early audition for a television role. "This old guy was the director and he was so well spoken, and he asked me where I was from, and I told him: 'Wales, Swansea,' and he just blanked me and turned to the casting director and said, 'oh no, she's not right'" ... So I said, 'I'm not going to do it in this voice, I'm going to do it with an English accent,' and he was like, 'no, honestly, there's no point'. He just wouldn't look at me, he wasn't listening to me."

In May 2010, Roach appeared in The Door Never Closes by Rex Obano at the Almeida Theatre. A number of high-profile roles followed, including Sasha in Being Human, Beth Partridge in Candy Cabs, and The Suspicions of Mr Whicher (in which she played notorious child murderer Constance Kent).

Roach starred as a young Margaret Thatcher in The Iron Lady. She appeared as Helene in Sky Comedy's Hunderby in autumn 2012, and was cast as Molly in the film adaptation of Michael Morpurgo's 2003 novel Private Peaceful. She was included on the Screen International "Stars of Tomorrow" list in 2011. In 2013, she starred in the British TV series Utopia.

On 3 June 2013, Roach appeared in the fifth episode of the ITV comedy Vicious, as Ash's vegan girlfriend Chloe. She returned to the role for one episode in June 2015. On 8 August 2014, she appeared in the inaugural episode of the BBC One TV comedy drama film Walter, in which she played a Welsh-speaking detective. In 2015, she starred in the TV series No Offence as DS Joy Freers.

In 2016, she became engaged to club promoter Jack Scales, whom she later married.

Roach was a presenter at the 2017 BAFTA Cymru Awards ceremony.

== Filmography ==
=== Film ===
Year	Title	Role	Notes
2011	The Iron Lady	Young Margaret Thatcher	
2012	Electric Cinema: How to Behave	Modern Day Woman	Short film
2012	Private Peaceful	Molly Monks	
2012	Anna Karenina	Countess Nordston	
2012	Night of the Loving Dead	Felicity	Short film
2012	Girls' Night Out	Princess Elizabeth	
2013	Trap for Cinderella	Do	
2013	One Chance	Julie-Ann Cooper: Mrs. Paul Potts	
2013	That Night	Girl	Short film; also writer
2014	Cuban Fury	Helen	
2014	Testament of Youth	Winifred Holtby	
2016	The Huntsman: Winter's War	Doreena	
2016	Pregnant Pause	Steph	Short film
2017	Memento Mori	(unknown)	Short film
2018	The Orgy	Meg	Short film
2019	The Kid Who Would Be King	Miss Foster	
2019	A Guide to Second Date Sex	Laura	
2022	This Is Christmas	Amanda	
2025	Pink	Rita	Short film

=== Television ===
Year	Title	Role	Notes
2001–2005	Pobol Y Cwm	Elin Owen	Unknown episodes
2010	The IT Crowd	Stenographer	Episode: "Reynholm vs Reynholm"
2011	Being Human	Sasha	Episode: "Type 4"
2011	Candy Cabs	Beth Partridge	3 episodes
2011	New Tricks	Nina Ward	Episode: "Moving Target"
2011	The Suspicions of Mr Whicher	Constance Kent	Episode: "The Murder at Road Hill House"
2012	Loserville	Kathryn	Television film
2012–2015	Hunderby	Helene	Series 1 and 2; 10 episodes
2013	The Thirteenth Tale	Hester Barrow	Television film
2013–2014	Utopia	Becky	Main role. Series 1 and 2; 11 episodes
2013, 2015	Vicious	Chloe	2 episodes: "Dinner Party" (2013), and "Stag Do" (2015)
2014	Under Milk Wood	Mae Rose Cottage	Television film
2014	Walter	DS Anne Hopkins	Television film
2014	Crackanory	Montserrat Bligh	Episode: "Man's Best Friend & Return to Sender"
2015–2018	No Offence	DS Joy Freers	Main cast. Series 1–3; 16 episodes
2017	Inside No. 9	Nina	Episode: "The Riddle of the Sphinx"
2017	Black Mirror	Carrie	Episode: "Black Museum"
2018	On the Edge	Becca	Mini-series; episode: "That Girl"
2018–2019	Hold the Sunset	Felicity	2 episodes: "Roger the Carer" and "The Lemming Family"
2019	Sanditon	Diana Parker	7 episodes
2019	Sticks and Stones	Jess Benson	Mini-series, 3 episodes
2020	Death in Paradise	Bethan Miller	Episode: "Murder on Mosquito Island"
2020	Killing Eve	Rhian	2 episodes: "Beautiful Monster", and "Are You Leading or Am I?"
2020	Zog and the Flying Doctors	Sunburnt Mermaid (voice)	Television short film
2021	Viewpoint	Zoe Sterling	Mini-series, 5 episodes
2022	Y Golau (The Light in the Hall)	Cat	Mini-series; 6 episodes
2023	Bodies	Maggie	Mini-series, 3 episodes
2023	Men Up	Ffion Jenkins	Television film
2024	Inside No. 9	Party Guest	Episode: "Plodding On"
2024	Nightsleeper	Abby Aysgarth	Mini-series; 6 episodes
2025	Lazarus	Jenna Lazarus	Mini-series, 6 episodes
2026	Death Valley	Angela Vaughan	Series 2; episode 1
2026	Hunting Alice Bell	Fran	Mini-series. 6 episodes

=== Video games ===
Year	Title	Role (voice)	Notes
2019	Du Lac & Fey: Dance of Death	Mary Jane Kelly	
2022	Elden Ring	Asimi	
