= Kate Summerscale =

English writer and journalist

- Born: 2 September 1965 (age 61); London, England
- Education: University of Oxford, Stanford University
- Occupations: Writer and journalist
- Writing career
- Notable work: The Suspicions of Mr Whicher or The Murder at Road Hill House
- Website: www.katesummerscale.com

Kate Summerscale (born 2 September 1965) is an English writer and journalist. She is best known for the bestselling narrative nonfiction books The Suspicions of Mr Whicher, which was made into a television drama, The Wicked Boy and The Haunting of Alma Fielding. She has won a number of literary prizes, including the Samuel Johnson Prize for Nonfiction in 2008.

== Biography ==
Summerscale was brought up in Japan, England and Chile. After attending Bedales School (1978–1983), she took a double-first at Oxford University and an MA in journalism from Stanford University. She lives in London with her son.

== Writing ==
She is the author of The Suspicions of Mr Whicher or The Murder at Road Hill House, based on a real-life crime committed by Constance Kent and investigated by Jack Whicher, a book described in Literary Review as an altogether "deft 21st-century piece of cultural detection" which won the Samuel Johnson Prize for Non-Fiction in 2008. Summerscale also wrote the bestselling The Queen of Whale Cay, about Joe Carstairs, "fastest woman on water", which won a Somerset Maugham Award in 1998 and was shortlisted for the 1997 Whitbread Awards for biography. Her book on Whicher inspired the 2011–2014 ITV drama series, The Suspicions of Mr Whicher, written by Helen Edmundson.

She worked for The Independent and from 1995 to 1996 she wrote and edited obituaries for The Daily Telegraph. She also worked as literary editor of The Daily Telegraph. Her articles have appeared in The Guardian, The Daily Telegraph and The Sunday Telegraph.

She has judged various literary competitions including the Booker Prize in 2001.

The Peepshow: The Murders at 10 Rillington Place was published in October 2024. In a piece she wrote for The Guardian, Summerscale said she found chilling resonances between the murders at 10 Rillington Place and modern events.

== Television adaptations ==
The Suspicions of Mr Whicher was turned into a hit ITV drama in 2011, running for two seasons. It starred Paddy Considine and Peter Capaldi and was adapted by Neil McKay and Helen Edmundson. As of 2021 The Haunting of Alma Fielding was being developed as a limited series by Charlotte Stoudt and Minkie Spiro, of New Pictures, who also made Fosse/Verdon.

== Awards and prizes ==
- 1997 Whitbread Award (for biography), shortlist, The Queen of Whale Cay
- 1998 Somerset Maugham Award, winner, The Queen of Whale Cay
- 2008 Samuel Johnson Prize, winner, The Suspicions of Mr Whicher or The Murder at Road Hill House
- 2009 Anthony Awards (Best Critical / Non-fiction Work), shortlist, The Suspicions of Mr Whicher or The Murder at Road Hill House
- 2010 Elected a fellow of the Royal Society of Literature
- 2017 Edgar Awards (Best Fact Crime), winner, The Wicked Boy: The Mystery of a Victorian Child Murderer
- 2020 Baillie Gifford Prize, shortlist, The Haunting of Alma Fielding
- 2025 Crime Writers' Association ALCS Gold Dagger for Non-Fiction, winner, The Peepshow

== Bibliography ==
- The Queen of Whale Cay, Fourth Estate, August 1997
- The Suspicions of Mr Whicher or The Murder at Road Hill House, Bloomsbury, April 2008
- Mrs Robinson's Disgrace (2012)
- The Wicked Boy: The Mystery of a Victorian Child Murderer (29 Apr 2016)
- The Haunting of Alma Fielding: A True Ghost Story (2020)
- The Book of Phobias and Manias, Profile Books, October 2022
- The Peepshow: The Murders at 10 Rillington Place, Bloomsbury, October 2024
