= Edward Badeley =

British lawyer

Edward Badeley QC
- Born: Edward Lowth Badeley; 1803 or 1804
- Died: 29 March 1868 (aged 63–65); London, England
- Education: Brasenose College, Oxford
- Occupation: Ecclesiastical barrister

Edward Lowth Badeley QC (1803 or 1804 – 1868) was an English ecclesiastical lawyer and member of the Oxford Movement who was involved in some of the most notorious cases of the 19th century.

== Early life ==
Born 1803 or 1804, Edward was the younger son of the medical doctor John Badeley and his wife, Charlotte née Brackenbury of Chelmsford. He graduated with second-class honours from Brasenose College, Oxford, in 1823 with a Bachelor of Arts in classics and took his Master of Arts degree in 1828. He was called to the bar by the Inner Temple in 1841.

He started to practise on the home circuit but was attracted by ecclesiastical law. Badeley had met John Henry Newman in 1837 and become a follower soon after. He soon became associated with his fellow Anglo-Catholic lawyers James Hope-Scott and Edward Bellasis in defending Tractarianism.

In 1848 he appeared for the objectors to the appointment of Renn Hampden as Bishop of Hereford. In 1849, a commission had been established to review the prohibition of marriage with a deceased wife's sister, a practice that was to remain unlawful in the United Kingdom until the Deceased Wife's Sister's Marriage Act 1907. Badeley made a submission, communicated by Edward Bouverie Pusey opposing any change in the law.

== Gorham judgment ==
Badeley appeared for Henry Phillpotts, the Bishop of Exeter, before the Judicial Committee of the Privy Council when George Cornelius Gorham appealed against Phillpotts' refusal to confirm him in the benefice of Brampford Speke. The Privy Council overturned the bishop's ruling, confirming Gorham in his living, and were seen to impose secular over canon authority, causing a great scandal in some quarters. In the summer of 1850, Badeley, Henry Manning and 12 other prominent Anglicans called upon the Church of England to repudiate the views that the Privy Council had expressed on baptism. There was no response from the Church of England, and thus Badeley and many others chose to be received into the Roman Catholic Church in 1852.

== Later life ==
Badeley was assistant counsel to Sir Alexander Cockburn in John Henry Newman's defence when he was prosecuted for libel by Giacinto Achilli in 1852. Badeley frequently advised Newman on legal matters thereafter, advising that Newman reject Charles Kingsley's partial withdrawal of his satirical jibe that Newman cared little for truth and encouraging him to write the Apologia Pro Vita Sua in response.

Much of his later practice concerned trusts and charities. In 1865, in the Constance Kent case, he argued, against settled opinion, that the principle of priest–penitent privilege applied in English law.

He maintained a lifelong friendship and correspondence with Hope-Scott and his family and Newman dedicated his Verses on Various Occasions to him as gratitude for his support in the Achilli trial. Badeley died on 29 March 1868 at his chambers at 13 Paper Buildings in the Inner Temple.

== Bibliography ==
- Badeley, Edward (1865). The Privilege of Religious Confessions in English Courts of Justice Considered, in a Letter to a Friend. London: Butterworths.
- Courtney, W. P. (1885). "Badeley, Edward Lowth" . In Stephen, Leslie (ed.). Dictionary of National Biography. Vol. 2. London: Smith, Elder & Co. pp. 384–385.
- Courtney, W. P.; Murphy, G. Martin (2004). "Badeley, Edward Lowth (1803/4–1868)". Oxford Dictionary of National Biography. Oxford: Oxford University Press. doi:10.1093/ref:odnb/1019. The first edition of this text is available at Wikisource (see Courtney 1885).
- Short, Edward (2011). Newman and His Contemporaries. London: T&T Clark. ISBN 978-0-567-10648-3.
