= Siobhan O'Neill =

English actress and musician

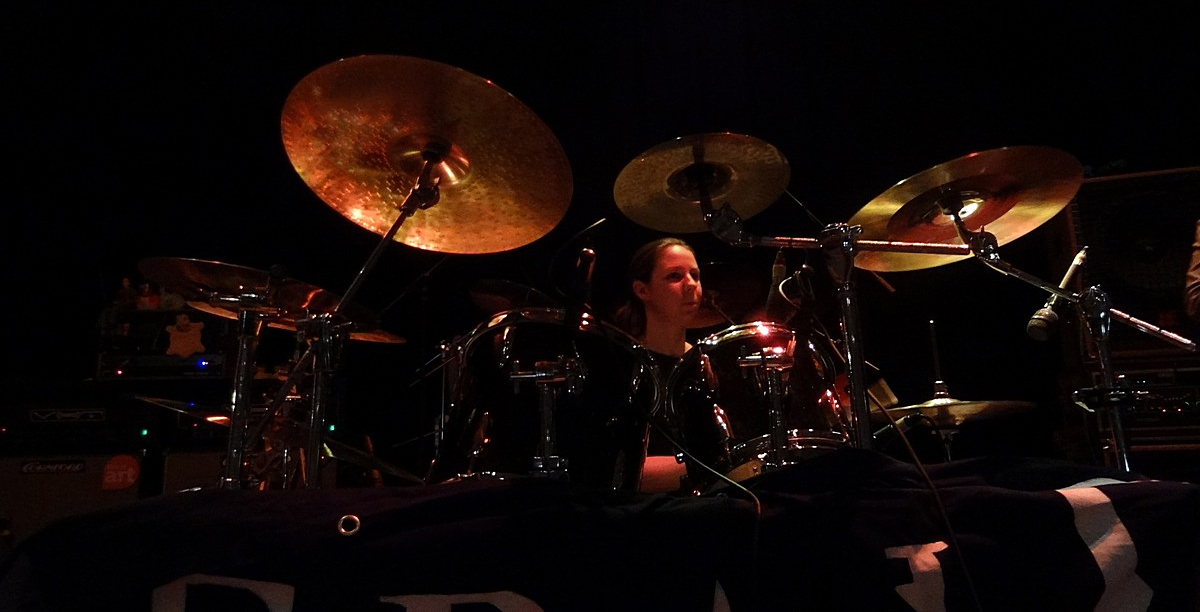
- Born: Huntingdon, Cambridgeshire, England
- Occupations: Actress, Musician
- Years active: 2007 - present
- Height: 5 ft 7 in (170 cm)

Siobhan O'Neill is an English actress and musician born in Huntingdon, Cambridgeshire. She is notable for her work in television, including Thor: The Dark World, TV sitcom Him and Her, TV sitcom Not Going Out starring Lee Mack and BBC TV medical series Holby City. Siobhan O'Neill is also the drummer for all-sister rock band Kyneska (formerly Emerald Sky). She has recently filmed the role of the Housemaid in The Suspicions of Mr Whicher - The murder in Angel Lane, alongside Olivia Colman and Paddy Considine, directed by Christopher Menaul for Hat Trick Productions and ITV.

== Early life ==
Siobhan O'Neill was a former chess prodigy and UK British Chess Champion, winning the U8 and U9 events at the 1992 British Junior Chess Championships in Plymouth and secured a place to play against world champion Garry Kasparov at a simultaneous tournament at Simpsons-In-The-Strand.

== Career ==
- Thor: The Dark World (2013) Feature Film - Singer in Asgard (Singing Role)
- Him & Her (2013), BBC TV Sitcom - Katie Clark
- Holby City (2013) BBC - Nurse
- The Suspicions of Mr. Whicher - The Murder in Angel Lane (2013) - Housemaid
- Downton Abbey (2012) - Kitchen Maid (Regular)
- Hunderby (2012) - Housemaid
- Harry Potter and The Deathly Hallows (2009) - Wedding Dancer
- The Knowledge of Beauty - (2008) - Marion
- The Bill (2007) Colin Wilde's Secretary
- My Family Christmas Special Lead Carol Singer

== Discography ==
- Album: Emerald Sky - Shadows of Darkness (2008) - Drummer/Backing Singer
