= Harry Hadden-Paton =

British actor (born 1981)

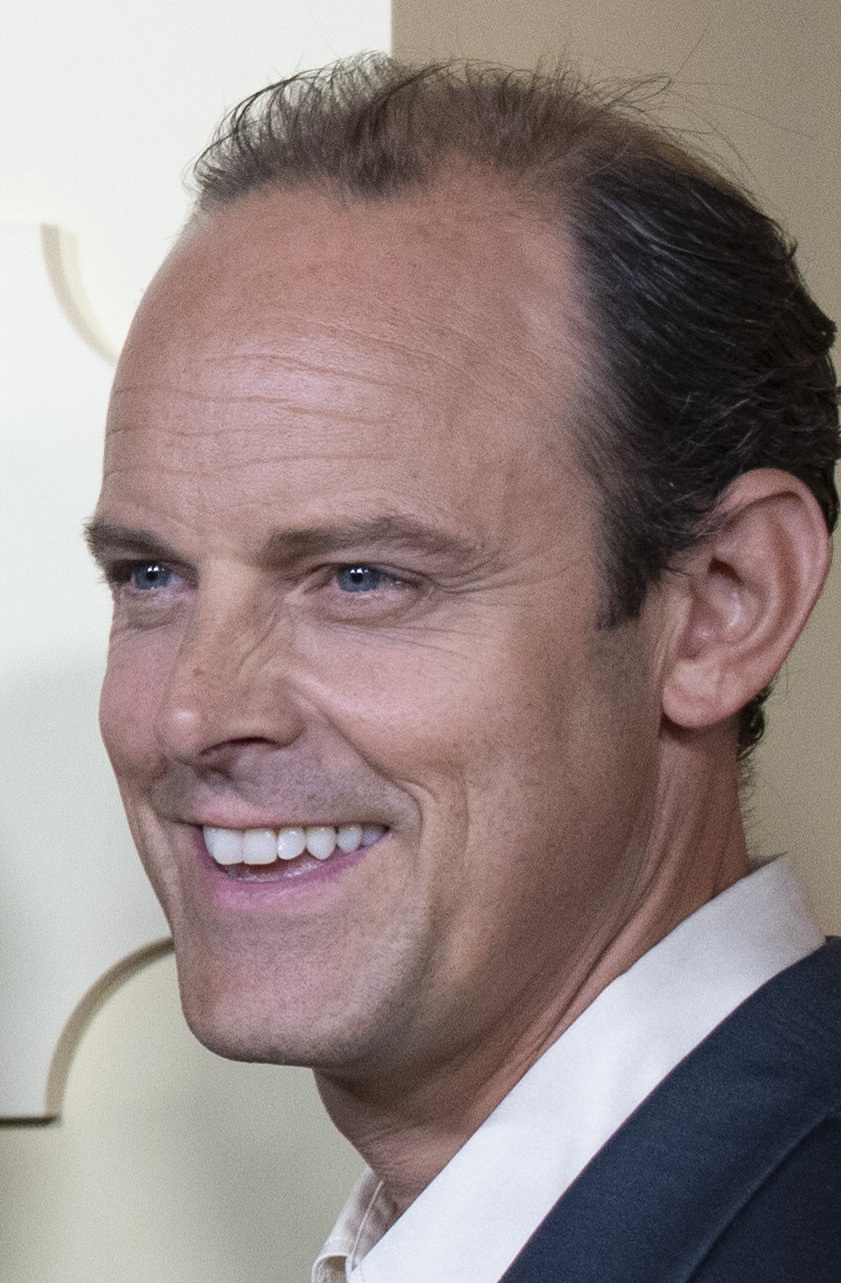
- Hadden-Paton in 2025
- Born: Harry Frederick Gerard Hadden-Paton; 10 April 1981 (age 45); Westminster, London, England
- Education: Eton College; Durham University; London Academy of Music and Dramatic Art
- Occupation: Actor
- Years active: 2006–present
- Spouse: Rebecca Night (m. 2010)
- Children: 3

Harry Frederick Gerard Hadden-Paton (born 10 April 1981) is a British actor. He is perhaps best known for his television roles as Herbert "Bertie" Pelham, 7th Marquess of Hexham, in the television series Downton Abbey (2014–2015) and Martin Charteris in The Crown (2016–2017).

Hadden-Paton played the lead role of Henry Higgins in the Lincoln Center Theater revival of My Fair Lady on Broadway, a performance for which he was nominated for the 2018 Tony Award for Best Actor in a Musical.

== Life ==
=== Family ===
Hadden-Paton was born at Westminster Hospital in London, the son of former cavalry officer Nigel Hadden-Paton, head of a landed gentry family of Rossway, near Berkhamsted, Hertfordshire, and Sarah ('Bumble'), daughter of Brigadier Frederick Mellor, of The Cottage, Chiddingfold, Surrey.

He is married to actress Rebecca Night, whom he met while performing in The Importance of Being Earnest.

=== Education ===
Hadden-Paton was educated at Eton College and Durham University. He trained at the London Academy of Music and Dramatic Art (LAMDA).

=== Stage ===
Since leaving LAMDA in 2006, Hadden-Paton has established himself as a leading stage actor. He was nominated for the 2007 Ian Charleson Awards. for his appearances in Romeo and Juliet at the Battersea Arts Centre, and as John Worthing in The Importance of Being Earnest, directed by Peter Gill. His stand-out performances continued with Captain Jack Absolute in The Rivals at the Southwark Playhouse, as Hohenzollern in The Prince of Homburg, at the Donmar Warehouse, and as Harry Villiers in the 2010 première of Posh at the Royal Court.

In 2011 he appeared as Teddy Graham in the Olivier Award-winning revival Flare Path, at the Theatre Royal Haymarket, and as Jackie Jackson in a film adaptation of The Deep Blue Sea.

He appeared as Michael Palin in the premiere of Steve Thompson's No Naughty Bits at the Hampstead Theatre, as Marlow in Jamie Lloyd's production of She Stoops to Conquer, at the National Theatre, as Alsamero in the Young Vic's production of The Changeling, and as Phillip in the hit revival of Alexi Kaye Campbell's The Pride at the Trafalgar Studios. Hadden-Paton made his Broadway debut playing Henry Higgins in a revival of My Fair Lady, for which he received Tony and Grammy Award nominations.

In 2021 Hadden-Paton originated a leading role in the musical Flying Over Sunset, directed by James Lapine, at the Vivian Beaumont Theater, Lincoln Center, New York. Having been postponed by the COVID-19 pandemic, the musical premiered on Broadway at the Vivian Beaumont Theater on 11 November 2021 in previews with the official opening on 13 December 2021.

=== Film and television ===
On television, he is best known for playing Bertie Pelham, the Marquess of Hexham, suitor of Lady Edith Crawley on Downton Abbey; their characters were married in the 2015 Christmas special that concluded the series. He has also starred in Midsomer Murders, The Amazing Mrs Pritchard, Hotel Babylon, Silk, Waking the Dead, Drifters, Walter, Wallander, and Grantchester.

He is also notable for appearances in the Oscar-winning La Vie en Rose (2007), The Deep Blue Sea (2011), The Hollow Crown (2012), and About Time (2013).

From 2016 to 2017, he played the role of Martin Charteris in the first two seasons of the Netflix series The Crown.

== Filmography ==
=== Film ===
Year	Title	Role	Notes
2007	La Vie en Rose	Doug Davis	
2009	In the Loop	Civil Servant	
2011	The Deep Blue Sea	Jackie Jackson	
2013	Having You	Barry	
2013	About Time	Rupert	
2018	The Little Stranger	Dr David Granger	
2019	Downton Abbey	Herbert "Bertie" Pelham, 7th Marquess of Hexham	
2022	Downton Abbey: A New Era	Herbert "Bertie" Pelham, 7th Marquess of Hexham	
2024	Twisters	Ben	
2025	Downton Abbey: The Grand Finale	Herbert "Bertie" Pelham, 7th Marquess of Hexham	Post-production

=== Television ===
Year	Title	Role	Notes
2006	The Amazing Mrs Pritchard	Hilary's advisor	Episode #1.3
2007	Hotel Babylon	Lisa's new man	Episode #2.4
2008	Waking the Dead	James Malham	Episodes: "Duty and Honour: Part 1 & 2"
2012	The Hollow Crown	Green	Episode: "Richard II"
2012	Midsomer Murders	Lawrence Janson	Episode: "Written in the Stars"
2013	Drifters	Waiter	Episode: "Scabies"
2014	Silk	Ashton	Episode #3.2
2014	Walter	CS Charles Addison	Television film
2014	Grantchester	William Calthorpe	Episode #1.2
2014–2015	Downton Abbey	Herbert "Bertie" Pelham, 7th Marquess of Hexham	7 episodes
2015	Wallander	Hans von Enke	Episodes: "A Lesson in Love", "The Troubled Man"
2016–2017	The Crown	Martin Charteris	11 episodes
2017	Versailles	Gaston	10 episodes
2018	Informer	Sid Powell	Episode: "Strawberry Fields"
2023	The Blacklist	Nigel Sutton	Episode: "The Sicilian Error of Color"
2024	Industry	Tom Wolsey	2 episodes

=== Video games ===
Year	Title	Role	Notes
2013	Divinity: Dragon Commander	Edmund / Yorrick / Grumio	
2014	Dragon Age: Inquisition	Male Inquisitor (British accent)	
2015	Final Fantasy XIV: Heavensward	Artoirel	
2015	Dragon Age: Inquisition – Trespasser	Male Inquisitor (British accent)	
2015	Sword Coast Legends	Dalanir Ch'fyr	
2017	Divinity: Original Sin II	The Red Prince	
2018	Vampyr	Clarence / Ichabod / Lord Finney / Swansea	
2020	Avengers	J.A.R.V.I.S.	
2024	Dragon Age: The Veilguard	Male Inquisitor (British accent)	

== Theatre ==
Year	Title	Role	Notes
2007	Romeo and Juliet	Mercutio	Battersea Arts Centre
2008	The Importance of Being Earnest	Jack Worthing	Vaudeville Theatre
2010	The Rivals	Captain Jack Absolute	Southwark Playhouse
2010	Posh	Harry Villiers	Royal Court Theatre
2010	The Prince of Homburg	Count Hohenzollern	Donmar Warehouse
2011	Flare Path	Teddy Graham	Theatre Royal Haymarket
2011	No Naughty Bits	Michael Palin	Hampstead Theatre
2012	She Stoops to Conquer	Young Charles Marlow	National Theatre
2012	The Changeling	Alsemero	Young Vic
2013	The Pride	Phillip	Trafalgar Studios
2018	My Fair Lady	Professor Henry Higgins	Vivian Beaumont Theater
2019	The King's Speech	George VI	Chicago Shakespeare Theater
2021	Flying Over Sunset	Aldous Huxley	Vivian Beaumont Theater
2022	My Fair Lady	Professor Henry Higgins	London Coliseum
2025	Here We Are	The Bishop	Lyttelton Theatre
2027	The Popinjay Cavalier	General Rudolfo Gurko	Phoenix Theatre, West End

== Awards and nominations ==
Year	Award	Category	Work	Result
2017	Screen Actors Guild Award	Outstanding Performance by an Ensemble in a Drama Series	The Crown	Nominated
2017	Screen Actors Guild Award	Outstanding Performance by an Ensemble in a Drama Series	Downton Abbey	Nominated
2018	Tony Award	Best Actor in a Musical	My Fair Lady	Nominated
2018	Drama Desk Award	Outstanding Actor in a Musical	My Fair Lady	Nominated
2018	Drama League Award	Distinguished Performance	My Fair Lady	Nominated
2018	Outer Critics Circle Award	Outstanding Actor in a Musical	My Fair Lady	Nominated
2018	Theatre World Award		My Fair Lady	Honoree
2019	Grammy Award	Best Musical Theater Album	My Fair Lady	Nominated
