= The Haunting of Alma Fielding =

2021 book by Kate Summerscale

The Haunting of Alma Fielding: A True Ghost Story
- Author: Kate Summerscale
- Publisher: Penguin Press
- Publication date: April 27, 2021
- Pages: 368
- ISBN: 978-0-525-55792-0

The Haunting of Alma Fielding: A True Ghost Story is a 2021 book by Kate Summerscale that examines the workings of Nandor Fodor in 1930s London.

== Synopsis ==
The Haunting of Alma Fielding: A True Ghost Story examines the case of Alma Fielding, a London housewife who was the subject of media attention in 1938 following reports of poltergeist activity in her Thorton Heath home. The events attracted the attention of paranormal investigator Nandor Fodor of the International Institute for Psychical Research, who conducted a series of investigations into the alleged haunting.

The case develops in the broader social and political atmosphere of 1930s Britain. Summerscale discusses spiritualism, psychoanalysis, gender roles, and pre-World War II anxieties. The book discusses differing explanations for the reported phenomena, including fraud, psychological trauma, and paranormal interpretations.

== Bibliography ==
- "The Haunting of Alma Fielding: A True Ghost Story". Kirkus Reviews. January 21, 2021.
- "The Haunting of Alma Fielding: A True Ghost Story". Publishers Weekly.
- Stasio, Marilyn (April 27, 2021). "When Teacups, Burning Lumps of Coal and Eggs Flew Through the Air". The New York Times.
- Lethbridge, Lucy (October 2023). "The Woolworths Poltergeist". Literary Review.
- Masad, Ilana (April 28, 2021). "'The Haunting Of Alma Fielding' Is A Ghost Story – And A Tale Of Power And Fear". NPR.
- Moorehead, Caroline (September 25, 2020). "Seance fiction stories: Ghostbusting between the wars". The Times Literary Supplement.
