= Walter (2014 film) =

2014 British television film

- Genre: Comedy drama
- Written by: Kevin Lygo
- Directed by: Damon Thomas
- Starring: Adrian Dunbar; Alexandra Roach; Kayvan Novak; Harry Hadden-Paton; Gerard Horan; Richie Campbell; Sophie Stanton; Chris Brailsford; Danny Erskine; Pip Torrens
- Composer: Michael Price
- Country of origin: United Kingdom
- Original language: English
- No. of episodes: 1

Production
- Producers: Catherine Gosling Fuller; Gregor Sharp; Francis Hopkinson; Caroline Leddy
- Cinematography: Peter Robertson
- Editor: Helen Chapman
- Running time: 60 minutes
- Production company: ITV Studios

Original release
- Network: BBC One
- Release: 8 August 2014

Walter is a British television crime drama film, written by Kevin Lygo under the pseudonym Ruby Solomon, that first broadcast on BBC One on 8 August 2014. Intended as a "backdoor pilot" for a potential series, Walter stars Adrian Dunbar as the title character, a detective inspector assigned to investigate the unsolved cases of a former colleague who met his death after falling in front of a tube train. Assisted by an eager new recruit, Anne Hopkins (Alexandra Roach) and his dim-yet-trusty sidekick Mike Minorsky (Kayvan Novak), Walter investigates whether his former colleague's death may have in fact been murder.

Described as a "comedy drama", with comparisons to fellow BBC stablemate New Tricks, the film was met with a number of negative reviews, including the Herald Scotland, whose writer described it as "the worst thing I've seen on TV this year." The film pulled in less than 3.34 million viewers, and was ranked outside the Top 30 programmes for that week.

== Cast ==
- Adrian Dunbar as DI Walter Gambon
- Alexandra Roach as DC Anne Hopkins
- Kayvan Novak as DS Mike Minorsky
- Harry Hadden-Paton as CS Charles Addison
- Gerard Horan as DS Geoffrey Pollard
- Richie Campbell as DC Noel Kress
- Sophie Stanton as DS Jennifer Simms
- Chris Brailsford as DI Rod Romney
- Danny Erskine as DC Lenny Rice
- Pip Torrens as Commander Angus Thomas

== Production ==
The film was commissioned by then BBC director of television Danny Cohen, comedy commissioning controller Shane Allen and BBC One controller Charlotte Moore.

Kevin Lygo scripted the film under the pseudonym Ruby Solomon. He told The Guardian that this was "to avoid any potential conflict of interest, because it was to be made by ITV Studios, and also partly because I'm naturally a bit mischievous". Lygo added that "he wrote it at weekends" and that it was "somewhere between New Tricks and Minder". His daughter Madison also stars in the film.
