= Kevin Lygo =

British television executive

Kevin Lygo (born 19 September 1957) is a British television executive, currently Director of Television at ITV.

== Early life ==
Lygo is the son of Royal Navy officer Raymond Lygo. Educated at Cranbrook School, Kent, Lygo studied Psychology at Durham University, graduating in 1980. After leaving university in 1980 one of his first jobs was at the Half-Price Theatre Ticket Booth in Leicester Square, operated by the Society of West End Theatre.

== Career ==
After August 1981, he was one of three trainees to join the BBC, alongside Peter Salmon (former BBC head of sport) and multi-award-winning film-maker Peter Kosminsky. After the two year trainee-ship as a comedy writer, during which he worked on The Two Ronnies, Lygo worked freelance, including on the launch of Terry Wogan's BBC1 chatshow, Wogan.

Lygo then left the television industry for seven years, part of which he spent in France as a dealer in Islamic art, with a gallery in Paris. Persuaded by friend Richard Curtis to produce Comic Relief, he came back on a six-month contract with the BBC. He then rejoined the BBC on a permanent contract, commissioning shows including Men Behaving Badly and They Think It's All Over.

Hired in 1997 by Channel 4, Lygo was Channel 4's Head of Entertainment between 1998 and 2001, where he commissioned TFI Friday, Smack the Pony, So Graham Norton, Trigger Happy TV and Spaced. After spending two years at Five on its launch, he returned to Channel 4 in 2003 as Director of Television and Content. In this role, he commissioned Big Brother, Sugar Rush and The F Word, and poached Richard and Judy.

He then spent 2010-2016 as managing director at ITV Studios, before becoming the director of television for the ITV Network.

Lygo used the pseudonym "Ruby Solomon" to write the TV drama Walter for the BBC. He submitted the script anonymously, which he thought would be a better fit for the BBC rather than his employer. Lygo's actress daughter, Madison, starred in Walter, a part he penned with her in mind.

In June 2023, Lygo appeared before the Culture, Media and Sport Committee as a witness in support of his colleague Carolyn McCall. Committee member Caroline Dinenage interrogated McCall about the culture at ITV.

In November 2023, Lygo attended an ITV promotional event during which he allegedly mocked politician and broadcaster Nigel Farage. ITV signed Farage to appear in I'm a Celebrity...Get Me Out of Here! for a reported fee of up to £1.5 million. Lygo was seen using a rude one-handed gesture. Farage finished third on his exit from the jungle, and issued a stern warning regarding Lygo's comments. He reminded the ITV boss of the repercussions that befell the former boss of NatWest, Alison Rose, who was forced to resign after discussing private banking information with a BBC journalist.
