= Sam Barnard (actor) =

English actor

Sam Barnard (born 21 October 1985 in Chatham, Kent, England) is a British actor with Down syndrome who has appeared in several British television dramas and public information films.

== Biography ==
In 2007, Barnard auditioned for a place on the "Staging Change" acting course for actors with learning disabilities, run by Mountview Academy of Theatre Arts and Mind the Gap Theatre Company. He was offered a place on the course and completed it in 2008. He appeared (uncredited) in one episode of BBC's EastEnders in 2007. In 2008 he appeared in The Oxford Murders, starring John Hurt and Elijah Wood, and later that year, he appeared in the "Thorpe Park" episode of Channel 4's The Inbetweeners.

In 2009, Sam appeared in and co-directed the short film Crime Report for ITV Fixers. He played lead roles in the short films Bully for You, produced by Voice UK and the Ministry of Justice in 2010 and See My Ability, produced by Derbyshire County Council and the Crown Prosecution Service in 2011. In 2012, Barnard co-directed the music video for Rocky and the Natives' single "Oyster Girl". In the same year he starred in ITV's feature-length film drama The Suspicions of Mr Whicher: The Murder in Angel Lane, performing alongside Paddy Considine and Olivia Colman.

Barnard featured in the first and second, third and fifth series of Channel 4's The Undateables (2012, 2013,2014). He was a guest on Channel 5's live chat show LIVE with Kaye Adams and on ITV's This Morning. Barnard was a member of the expert panel for The Undateables Masterclass at the 2013 Guardian International Television Festival in Edinburgh. In 2017 he appeared as Andrew in Episode 1 of Series 3 of the television drama Grantchester. and as Darren Tailor in BBC TV drama "Casualty". Sam became the first actor with Down's Syndrome to star in a professional Pantomime as the Giant's Henchman in Jack and the Beanstalk at the RCC Theatre, Rye in 2017.

Around Christmas 2020, Sam starred in a BBC podcast drama called Missing You, playing alongside June Brown.

In September 2025 Sam was cast as Gus in the upcoming film The Man with the Plan about the Beveridge Report, by Sands Films.
