= The Suspicions of Mr Whicher =

British television films, 2011 to 2014

- The Suspicions of Mr Whicher DVD cover
- Based on: The Suspicions of Mr Whicher or The Murder at Road Hill House by Kate Summerscale
- Written by: Neil McKay; Helen Edmundson
- Starring: Paddy Considine; Tim Pigott-Smith; William Beck; Nancy Carroll
- Country of origin: United Kingdom
- Original language: English
- No. of episodes: 4

Production
- Running time: 95 minutes
- Production company: Hat Trick Productions

Original release
- Network: ITV
- Release: 25 April 2011 – 14 September 2014

The Suspicions of Mr Whicher is a British series of television films made by Hat Trick Productions for ITV, written by Neil McKay and Helen Edmundson. It stars Paddy Considine in the title role of detective inspector Jack Whicher of the Metropolitan Police. The first film, The Murder at Road Hill House (broadcast in 2011), was based on the real-life Constance Kent murder case of 1860, as interpreted by Kate Summerscale in her 2008 book The Suspicions of Mr Whicher or The Murder at Road Hill House, which was the winner of Britain's Samuel Johnson Prize for Non-Fiction in 2008, and was read as BBC Radio 4's Book of the Week in April the same year.

Subsequent TV episodes are fictionalised accounts of Whicher's career as a private inquiry agent. McKay wrote the first of these, The Suspicions of Mr Whicher: The Murder In Angel Lane, which was filmed in early 2013 and was broadcast on 12 May 2013. It was followed by two episodes written by Edmundson, The Suspicions of Mr Whicher: Beyond the Pale, broadcast on 7 September 2014, and The Suspicions of Mr Whicher: The Ties that Bind, broadcast on 14 September 2014. Considine later announced on Twitter that the show would not be continuing.

== The Murder at Road Hill House ==
The drama was directed by James Hawes and was written by Neil McKay, based on the book The Suspicions of Mr Whicher or The Murder at Road Hill House by Kate Summerscale.

=== Synopsis ===
When three-year-old Saville Kent is found murdered in dreadful circumstances at the family home in Wiltshire, Commissioner Mayne sends Scotland Yard detective Inspector Jack Whicher to investigate the crime. Local Superintendent Foley believes that the murder is an 'inside job', committed by Saville's nurse Elizabeth Gough, whom he suspects the child had seen in bed with a man, possibly the child's father, Samuel Kent, but whom he is forced to release due to lack of evidence.

When Whicher arrives, Foley, suspicious of this outsider and his progressive police methods, reluctantly agrees to help. The focus of Whicher's investigation is a torn and blood-stained piece from a woman's undergarment that had been found during the initial search for the missing boy. Constance Kent, Samuel's sixteen-year-old daughter from his first marriage, claims that one of her three night-gowns had been lost by the laundress. When Dr. Stapleton, the family's doctor tells Whicher that Constance, like her late mother, is mentally unstable and resentful of Saville, her father's son from his second marriage, she immediately becomes Whicher's prime suspect. It is discovered that Constance and her younger brother William hate their stepmother—who had, in fact, been employed as their former nanny, with whom their father had had an affair while their mother was dying.

He visits a schoolmate of Constance, Emma Moody, who tells him that Constance enjoyed making Saville cry. As the circumstantial evidence builds, Whicher arrests Constance, he having been convinced that she had killed her half-brother out of revenge against her father for his treatment of her mother and his neglect of her and William, but he fails to get a confession from her or William. Whicher desperately seeks Constance's missing nightdress, which he believes she wore while murdering her half-brother, as the key evidence to proving her guilt.

He suspects Constance disposed of the blood-soaked nightdress after the murder, and tricked everyone into believing it had been lost by the washerwoman. However, he cannot find the nightdress and, at her hearing, her lawyer discredits Whicher's case by willfully misrepresenting it. Moody is called as a witness, but she lies and states that Constance adored her half-brother, and Constance is released without a trial. Whicher accuses Mr. Kent of abetting the wrongful acquittal.

Whicher's reputation is destroyed. He suffers a breakdown and leaves the police force. Five years later, in 1865, Constance confesses her guilt to a clergyman, the Rev. Arthur Wagner, and is re-tried. In court, Wagner gives a declaration that he must withhold any information on the grounds that it had been received under the seal of "sacramental confession". At the same time it is revealed that Foley had withheld evidence from Whicher during the original investigation. This time Constance admits her guilt, but refuses to corroborate Whicher's theory that her brother was also involved in the murder. Mr. Kent decides to forgive Constance, indirectly admitting to Whicher his fault of not being a better father.

Constance is sentenced to death. However, the end intertitle reveals that, due to public outcry after the trial, the sentence was commuted to life in prison, that she was released after serving twenty years, and that she emigrated to Australia (where William was now living) where she died at the age of 100.

=== Cast ===
- Paddy Considine ... Detective Jack Whicher
- Peter Capaldi ... Samuel Kent
- Tom Georgeson ... Superintendent Foley
- William Beck ... 'Dolly' Williamson
- Emma Fielding ... Mary Kent
- Tim Pigott-Smith ... Commissioner Mayne
- Kate O'Flynn... Elizabeth Gough
- Donald Sumpter ... Peter Edlin QC
- Ben Miles ... Dr. Stapleton
- Alexandra Roach ... Constance Kent
- Jay Simpson ... George Redman
- Peter Gordon ... Holcombe
- Charlie Hiett... William Kent
- Sarah Ridgeway ... Sarah Cox
- Ben Crompton ... William Nutt
- Ruairi Conaghan ... Benger
- Anthony Hunt... Constable Urch
- Julian Firth ... MP
- Richard Lintern ... Henry Ludlow
- Katy Murphy ... Mrs. Holley
- Beth Cooke ... Emma Moody
- Lizzie Hopley ... Harriet Gollop
- Andrew Woodall ... Magistrate
- Antony Byrne ... Reverend Wagner (as Anthony Byrne)
- Lucy Scarfe... Elizabeth Kent (uncredited)

== The Murder In Angel Lane ==
The second film in the series was made in early 2013. Considine returned as Whicher, now a private inquiry agent. Olivia Colman co-starred. The script was written by Neil McKay. It was directed by Christopher Menaul with Mark Redhead as executive producer, and Rob Bullock as producer. It was filmed on location in Oxfordshire, Bedfordshire, and central London.

=== Synopsis ===
Whicher notices wealthy Susan Spencer searching for her pregnant 16-year-old niece Mary Drew in a low public house in London's notorious Angel Lane. Finding him helpful, she enlists his services to find her niece. Drew is later found murdered in Angel Lane, robbed of an expensive family heirloom and having recently given birth to a son. Spencer then asks Whicher to work for her privately to investigate the murder.

Whicher seeks the help of his former colleagues in the Metropolitan Police, including 'Dolly' Williamson and Commissioner Mayne, but, with the exception of Inspector Lock, they warn Whicher off from interfering in what is a police matter. The search then begins for Stephen Gann, Drew’s lover and the father of her child. Whicher finds the missing child at a refuge for fallen women run by Roman Catholic nuns. Some days later at the morgue, he confronts Gann, who panics and pulls a knife which appears to be the murder weapon and makes his escape, leaving the knife behind.

When Whicher visits Spencer's country home, he learns that her father had been murdered by Gann's father. Whicher's enquiries take him to a lunatic asylum, to question Gann's grandfather, where his suspicions lead to a fresh grave being reopened but without result. Shaken by his failure, Whicher decides to give up the investigation. Encouraged by Spencer, he then discovers a new clue after Drew's funeral when he finds Gann at her grave. Gann explains how he was attacked and how Drew was mistakenly stabbed. Agreeing to help, he is later detained by Lock after his rich uncle insists he’s a liar.

Whicher returns to the asylum where he accuses the director, Dr Casement, of several suspicious deaths related to the case. He is, however, accused of being mentally unstable and locked up with the collusion of Lock. Gann's grandfather then reveals the identity of Spencer's father's murderer. It was his other son, Gann's ambitious and wealthy uncle, Thomas, who was, with Spencer, the parents of Drew. Whicher escapes and confronts the uncle, telling him about his part in killing his until then unknown daughter, leading to Lock’s death and his arrest. Gann, his grandfather, and Spencer then reconcile via the child connecting both their families.

=== Cast ===
- Paddy Considine ... Inspector Jack Whicher
- Olivia Colman ... Susan Spencer
- William Beck ... Chief Inspector 'Dolly' Williamson
- Tim Pigott-Smith ... Commissioner Mayne
- Shaun Dingwall ... Inspector George Lock
- William Postlethwaite ... Stephen Gann
- Mark Bazeley ... Thomas Gann
- Sean Baker ... Joshua Gann
- Alistair Petrie ... Dr. Casement
- Joanna Jeffrees ... Nursemaid
- Siobhan O'Neill ... Housemaid
- Asher Kemp ... Baby Stephen
- Justine Mitchell ... Sister Anne
- Nancy Carroll ... Charlotte
- Sam Barnard ... Robert
- Justin Edwards ... Rev. Marlow
- Jody Halse ... Clarence Shaw
- Andy Gathergood ... Sergeant Parker
- James Wilson ... Pickpocket Youth
- Brett Allen ... Landlord
- Neal Barry ... Finch
- Tom Padley ... Pub Bystander
- Carolyn Tomkinson ... Creed's Woman
- Nick Caldecott ... Dr. Drake
- Mark Kempner ... Toby

== Beyond the Pale ==
The historic Chatham Dockyard in Kent was used as a film location for some of the London streets and docks.

=== Synopsis ===
Whicher is approached by Sir Edward Shore MP, who had been Home Secretary when Whicher was dismissed from the police force (he signed the dismissal letter). Sir Edward wants Whicher to look into threats made against his son Charles, who has recently returned to London from India with his wife and children. Charles is being pursued by Asim Jabour, an Indian seeking money or revenge, now passing as a lascar (Indian sailor) in the Docklands. Sir Edward wants the affair dealt with secretly, not by the police. But then Asim is found murdered, and Whicher demands that the Shores tell him the whole story and identify the dead man to the police. Whicher's investigation uncovers a kidnapping and a secret interracial marriage that threatens the future of the son.

=== Cast ===
- Paddy Considine ... Inspector Jack Whicher
- John Heffernan ... Captain Charles Shore
- Laura Morgan ... Katherine Shore
- Nicholas Jones ... Sir Edward Shore
- Kate Fahy ... Georgia Shore
- Adrian Quinton ... Asim Jabour
- Ellora Torchia ... Miss Kahn / Zeenat Jabour
- Akshay Kumar ... Roshan Jabour
- Anthony O'Donnell ... Father John
- Laura Elphinstone ... Sister Claire
- Nancy Carroll ... Mrs Piper
- Tim Pigott-Smith ... Commissioner Sir Richard Mayne

== The Ties That Bind ==
=== Synopsis ===
Whicher follows a married woman through London to a secret assignation. He is bearing witness to an open and shut case that will lead to divorce for Sir Henry Coverley from his wife, Lady Jane. But, when the co-respondent is killed, a simple case soon spirals out of control, embracing love, desire, gambling, corruption, theft, and a forbidden relationship that leads to murder.
