= Scandal at High Chimneys =

1959 novel by John Dickson Carr

Scandal At High Chimneys
- First edition (US)
- Author: John Dickson Carr
- Cover artist: Irv Docktor
- Language: English
- Genre: Historical, mystery, detective novel
- Publisher: Hamish Hamilton (UK) & Harper (US)
- Publication date: 1959
- Publication place: United Kingdom
- Media type: Print (hardback & paperback)
- Pages: 230 (1st US)

Scandal at High Chimneys: A Victorian Melodrama is a historical mystery novel by John Dickson Carr. It was published in the US and Canada by Harper & Row in August 1959.

The story is set in London, 1865, and concerns a house called High Chimneys, where secrets are hidden among the household members.

== Plot introduction ==
Lawyer and author Clive Strickland visits the estate of his friend Victor Damon. During his stay at the mansion, a ghost-like figure appears and Matthew Damon is murdered under seemingly impossible circumstances. Detective Jonathan Whicher investigates the case.
