= Constance Kent =

English murderer (1844–1944)

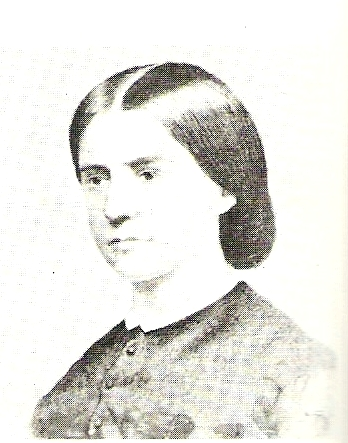
- Contemporary portrait of Constance Kent
- Born: Constance Emily Kent; 6 February 1844; Sidmouth, England
- Died: 10 April 1944 (aged 100); Strathfield, New South Wales, Australia
- Other name: Ruth Emilie Kaye

Constance Emily Kent (1844–1944) was an English woman who confessed in 1865 to the murder of her half-brother, Francis Saville Kent, in 1860, when she was aged 16 and he aged three. The case led to high-level pronouncements that there was no longer any ancient priest-penitent privilege in England and Wales. Kent's death sentence was commuted to life imprisonment, and she was released after serving twenty years. In later life, she changed her name to Ruth Emilie Kaye, became a nurse and, for twenty years, was matron of a nurses' home in East Maitland, New South Wales. She died at the age of 100.

== Early life ==
Constance Kent was born in Sidmouth, Devon, England, on 6 February 1844, the fifth daughter and ninth child of Samuel Saville (or Savill) Kent (1801–1872), an Inspector of Factories for the Home Office, and his first wife, Mary Ann (1808–1852), daughter of prosperous coachmaker and expert on the Portland Vase, Thomas Windus of Stamford Hill, London.

== Crime ==
Sometime during the night of 29‍–‍30 June 1860, Francis Saville Kent, who was almost four years old, disappeared from his father's residence, Road Hill House, in the village of Rode (spelt "Road" at the time), then in Wiltshire. Francis's body was later found in the vault of a privy-house on the property. The child, still dressed in his nightshirt and wrapped in a blanket, had knife wounds on his chest and hands, and his throat was slashed so deeply that he was almost decapitated.

Francis's nursemaid, Elizabeth Gough, was initially arrested. However, Gough was released when the suspicions of Detective Inspector Jack Whicher of Scotland Yard moved to the boy's 16-year-old half-sister, Constance. She was arrested on 16 July but released without trial owing to public opinion against the accusations of a working-class detective against a young lady of breeding.

After the investigation collapsed, the Kent family moved to Wrexham and sent Constance to a finishing school in Dinan, France.

== Committal ==
Constance was prosecuted for the murder five years later, in 1865. She had made a statement confessing her guilt to an Anglo-Catholic clergyman, Arthur Wagner, and expressed to him her resolution to give herself up to justice. Wagner assisted her in carrying out the resolution, and he gave evidence of this statement before the magistrates but prefaced his evidence by a declaration that he must withhold any further information on the ground that it had been received under the seal of "sacramental confession". He was but lightly pressed by the magistrates, as the prisoner was not contesting the charge.

The substance of Constance's confession was that, after waiting until the family and servants were asleep, she had opened the shutters and window in the drawing room, taken Francis from his room wrapped in a blanket that she had taken from between sheet and counterpane in his cot (leaving both these undisturbed or readjusted), left the residence and then killed him in the privy-house with a razor stolen from her father. It had been necessary to hide matches in the privy-house beforehand for a light to see by during the act of murder. The murder was not a spontaneous act, it seems, but one of revenge, and it was suggested that Constance had at certain times been mentally unbalanced.

There was much speculation at the time that Constance's confession was false. Many supposed that her father, a known adulterer, was having an affair with Elizabeth Gough and murdered the child in a fit of rage after coitus interruptus. The theory fitted a pattern with the senior Kent, who had romanced the family nanny, Mary Drewe Pratt, while his first wife Mary Ann Kent (Constance's mother) was dying, and subsequently married Pratt (Francis's mother). Many were suspicious of the senior Kent from the start, including the novelist Charles Dickens.

However, in her book The Suspicions of Mr Whicher or The Murder at Road Hill House (2008), author Kate Summerscale concluded that if Constance's confession was indeed false and merely an act to shield another person, it was for the benefit of not her father but her brother, William Saville-Kent, with whom she shared a very close sibling relationship, which was further deepened by her father turning his paternal attentions away from the children of his first marriage to the children he had with his second wife. William was indeed suspected during the investigations but was never charged. Summerscale suggests that if William was not the culprit solely responsible for Francis's death, he was at least an accomplice to Constance.

Constance never recanted her confession, even after her father's and her brother's deaths. She also kept her silence about the motive for the murder. In all of her statements, she emphasised and insisted that she bore no hatred nor jealousy toward her half-brother. As a result of her research, Summerscale comes to the conclusion that no matter whether the murder of Francis was committed by Constance or William alone, or by both of them, it was an act of revenge against their father for turning his attention to the children of his second marriage, of whom Francis was his reported favourite.

== Press excitement ==
At Devizes Assize Court, Constance Kent pleaded guilty, and her plea was accepted, so that Wagner was not again called. The position that he assumed before the magistrates caused much public debate in the press. There was considerable expression of public indignation that it should have been suggested that he could have any right as against the state to withhold evidence on the ground that he had put forward. The indignation seems to have been largely directed against the assumption that sacramental confession was known to the Church of England.

== Parliamentary comment ==
Questions were asked in both Houses of Parliament. In the House of Lords, Lord Westbury, the Lord Chancellor, in reply to the Marquess of Westmeath, stated that:

...there can be no doubt that in a suit or criminal proceeding a clergyman of the Church of England is not privileged so as to decline to answer a question which is put to him for the purposes of justice, on the ground that his answer would reveal something that he had known in confession. He is compelled to answer such a question, and the law of England does not even extend the privilege of refusing to answer to Roman Catholic clergymen in dealing with a person of their own persuasion.

Lord Westbury stated that it appeared that an order for committal for contempt of court had in fact been made against Wagner. If that is so, it was not enforced.

On the same occasion, Lord Chelmsford, a previous Lord Chancellor, stated that the law was clear that Wagner had no privilege at all to withhold facts which came to his knowledge in confession. Lord Westmeath said that there had been two recent cases, one being the case of a priest in Scotland, who, on refusing to give evidence, had been committed to prison. As to this case, Lord Westmeath stated that, upon an application for the priest's release being made to the Home Secretary, Sir George Grey, the latter had replied that if he were to remit the sentence without an admission of error on the part of the Catholic priest and without an assurance on his part that he would not again in a similar case adopt the same course, he (the Home Secretary) would be giving a sanction to the assumption of a privilege by ministers of every denomination which, he was advised, they could not claim. The second case was R v Hay.

Lord Westbury's statement in the House of Lords drew a protest from Henry Phillpotts, the Bishop of Exeter, who wrote to him a letter strongly maintaining the privilege which had been claimed by Wagner. The bishop argued that the canon law on the subject had been accepted without gainsaying or opposition from any temporal court, that it had been confirmed by the Book of Common Prayer in the service for the visitation of the sick, and, thus, had been sanctioned by the Act of Uniformity. Phillpotts was supported by Edward Lowth Badeley who wrote a pamphlet on the question of priest–penitent privilege. From the bishop's reply to Lord Westbury's answer to his letter, it is apparent that Lord Westbury had expressed the opinion that the 113th canon of 1603 simply meant that the "clergyman must not ex mero motu and voluntarily and without legal obligation reveal what is communicated to him in confession". He appears, also, to have expressed an opinion that the public was not at the time in a temper to bear any alteration of the rule compelling the disclosure of such evidence.

== Sentence ==
Constance Kent was sentenced to death, but this was commuted to life in prison owing to her youth at the time and her confession. She served twenty years in a number of gaols, including Millbank Prison, and was released in 1885, at the age of 41.

During her time in prison, Constance purportedly produced mosaics for a number of churches, including work for the crypt of St. Paul's cathedral. However, Noeline Kyle, in her book A Greater Guilt, discusses the work Constance was engaged in while incarcerated, including cooking, cleaning and laundry work, and what Kyle describes – in light of a lack of evidence of Kent's making of any mosaics and the fact that "none of the true crime writers on this topic ... say where this information is sourced from" – as the myth of the mosaics.

== Later life ==
Constance emigrated to Australia early in 1886 and joined her brother William in Tasmania, where he worked as a government adviser on fisheries. She changed her name to Ruth Emilie Kaye and trained as a nurse at The Alfred Hospital in Prahran, Melbourne, Victoria, before being appointed sister-in-charge of the Female Lazaret at the Coast Hospital, Little Bay, in Sydney, New South Wales. From 1898 to 1909, she worked at the Parramatta Industrial School for Girls. She lived in the New South Wales town of Mittagong for a year, and was then made matron of the Pierce Memorial Nurses' Home at East Maitland, serving there from 1911 until she retired in 1932.

== Death ==
Constance Kent died on 10 April 1944, aged 100, in a private hospital in the Sydney suburb of Strathfield. On 11 April 1944, The Sydney Morning Herald reported that she was to be cremated at the nearby Rookwood Cemetery Crematorium.

== In arts, media and entertainment ==
=== Film ===
- The anthology horror film, Dead of Night (1945), included in its five separate stories a section called "Christmas Party" with Sally Ann Howes as Sally O'Hara. This story is loosely based on the Constance Kent case; "Christmas Party" was an original screenplay based on an original story by the screenplay author Angus MacPhail. While playing hide-and-seek in an old house, Sally hears a child sobbing and comes into a bedroom where she meets a little boy named Francis Kent whose sister Constance is mean to him. Sally comforts the child, and then leaves him when he is asleep. Then she finds the others from the party and learns that Francis was killed by Constance over 80 years before.

=== Literature ===
- Mary Elizabeth Braddon used elements of the case in Lady Audley's Secret (1862).
- Wilkie Collins used elements of the case in his detective novel The Moonstone (1868), including using the difference in class between the detective and the suspect as a sub-theme.
- Charles Dickens based the flight of Helena Landless in The Mystery of Edwin Drood (1870) on Kent's early life.
- James Friel's novel Taking the Veil (1989) is inspired by Kent's life.
- Sharyn McCrumb's novel Missing Susan (1991) refers to this case.
- The character Cormoran Strike refers to this case in the 2023 Robert Galbraith novel The Running Grave.

=== Non-fiction studies ===
- The Case of Constance Kent (1928) by John Rhode. Rhode later published a shorter piece on the case ("Constance Kent") in The Anatomy of Murder (1936)
- Kate Summerscale's book The Suspicions of Mr Whicher (2008) about the case was read as BBC Radio 4's Book of the Week from 7 to 11 April 2008. It won Britain's Samuel Johnson Prize for Non-Fiction in 2008.
- F. Tennyson Jesse included a chapter on the Constance Kent case in her 1924 study, Murder and Its Motives.

=== Television ===
- The eight-part BBC series about three female murderers, titled A Question of Guilt (1980), features Prue Clarke as Constance Kent and Joss Ackland as Samuel Kent.
- An episode of the Investigation Discovery channel series Deadly Women, "A Daughter's Revenge" (2010), features a segment on Constance Kent who is portrayed by Miranda Daisy Herman.
- The television film The Suspicions of Mr Whicher: The Murder at Road Hill House (25 April 2011, ITV) is a dramatization of the case.
- The Swedish crime TV series Veckans Brott (2012) had six special episodes about English murders, one of which was about the murder at Road Hill House.

== Bibliography ==
- Altick, Richard (1970). Victorian Studies in Scarlet: Murders and Manners in the Age of Victoria. New York: Norton. ISBN 978-0-393-33624-5.
- [Anon.] (1984) Australian Gemmologist, 15(5): February, 155
- [Anon.] (2002) Protist (Germany), 153(4): 413
- Atlay, J. B. (1897). "Famous trials: the Road mystery". Cornhill Magazine. 2: [3rd] ser., 80–94.
- Badeley, E. (1865). The Privilege of Religious Confessions in English Courts of Justice Considered, in a Letter to a Friend. London: Butterworths.
- Bridges, Y. (1954). Saint – with Red Hands? The Chronicle of a Great Crime. London: Jarrolds.
- Courtney, W. P. (2004) "Badeley, Edward Lowth (1803/4–1868)", rev. G. Martin Murphy, Oxford Dictionary of National Biography, Oxford University Press, accessed 22 July 2007 (subscription required)
- Davenport-Hines, R. (2006) "Kent, Constance Emilie (1844–1944)", Oxford Dictionary of National Biography, Oxford University Press, online edn, accessed 29 August 2007 (subscription, Wikipedia Library access or UK public library membership required)
- Harrison, A. J. (1997). Savant of the Australian Seas: William Saville-Kent (1845–1908) and Australian Fisheries. Hobart: Tasmanian Historical Research Association.
- — (2005) "Kent, Constance (1844–1944)", Australian Dictionary of Biography, Supplementary Volume, Melbourne University Press, pp352–353
- Hartman, M. (1977). Victorian Murderesses. London: Robson Books Ltd. pp. 94–101, 107–12, 118–29. ISBN 978-0-86051-343-8.
- Jesse, F. T. (1924). Murder and its Motives. London: Harrap. pp. 74–116.
- Kyle, N.J. (2009). A Greater Guilt: Constance Emilie Kent & the Road Murder. Brisbane: Boolarong Press. ISBN 978-1-921555-34-3.
- Nolan, R. S. (1913) "The Law of the Seal of Confession", Catholic Encyclopaedia
- Rhode, J. (1928). The Case of Constance Kent. London: Geoffrey Bles.
- Roughead, W. (1966). Classic Crimes 1: Katharine Nairn, Deacon Brodie, The West Port Murders, Madeleine Smith, Constance Kent and The Sandyford Mystery. London: Panther. pp. 137–70.; originally in The Rebel Earl and Other Studies, (Edinburgh: W. Green & Son, Limited, 1926), as "Constance Kent's Conscience: A Mid-Victorian Mystery", pp. 47–86
- Stapleton, J. W. (1861). The Great Crime of 1860. E. Marlborough.
- Taylor, B. (1979). Cruelly Murdered: Constance Kent and the Killing at Road Hill House. London: Souvenir Press. ISBN 978-0-285-62387-3.
- Wagner, A. R.; Dale, A. (1983). The Wagners of Brighton. Phillimore. pp. 105–118.
- Reference to Constance Kent, newadvent.org. Accessed 23 February 2024.
