= Church of St Lawrence, Rode =

Church in Somerset, England

Church of St Lawrence
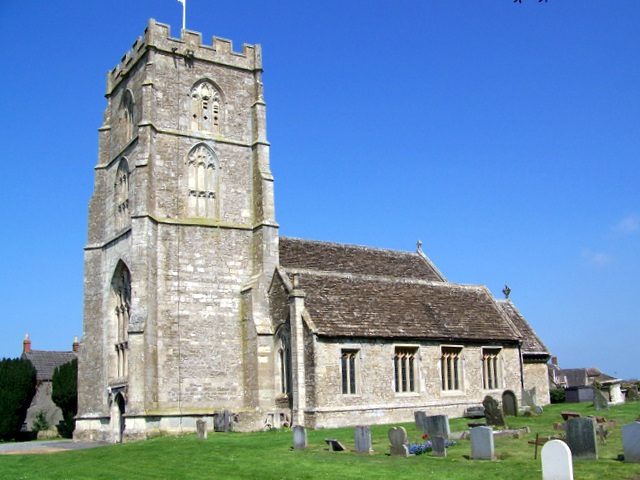

- Location within Somerset

General information
- Location: Rode, Somerset, England
- Coordinates: 51.2793°N 2.2766°W
- Construction started: 14th century
- Completed: 15th century

The Church of St Lawrence in Rode, Somerset, England, dates from the late 14th and early 15th century. It was restored in 1874 by Charles Edward Davis and is a Grade I listed building.

It is likely that there was a previous church on the same site, and some fragments of a Norman doorway survive.

The church underwent significant work, initially to the pulpit gallery and bells in 1774, and Victorian restoration between 1873 and 1874.

The tower has contained bells since the 16th century, however in 1753 Thomas Bilbie of the Bilbie family of Chew Stoke cast a new peel of six bells. One was recast by the Whitechapel Bell Foundry in 1817. These hung in the tower into the 20th century but were not used because of safety concerns. The wooden frame was replaced by one made of steel between 2003 and 2006 when the bells were rededicated and could be rung again.

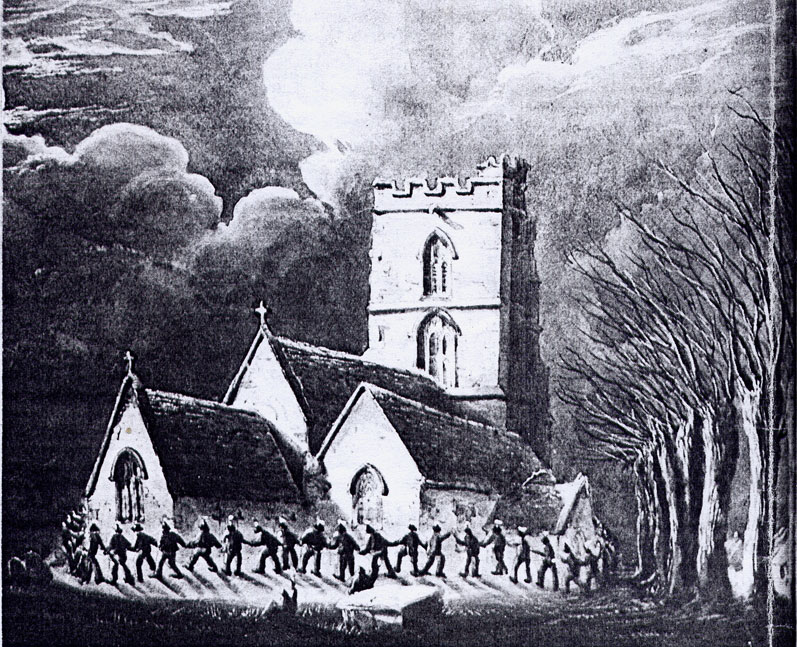
Clipping the church. Painting by W. W. Wheatley in 1848

The church is the setting for an annual ceremony known as Clipping the church. It is an ancient custom that is traditionally held on Easter Monday or Shrove Tuesday in the United Kingdom. The word "clipping" is Anglo-Saxon in origin, and is derived from the word "clyp-pan", meaning "embrace" or "clasp". Clipping the church involves either the church congregation or local children holding hands in an outward-facing ring around the church. Once the circle is completed onlookers will often cheer and sometimes hymns are sung. At Rode the circle faces inwards and participants dance to the left and right before rushing inwards and cheering. John Michell and Margaret Murray suggest that the nocturnal ritual at Rode may have had non-Christian (possibly neopagan) motivations.

The parish is part of the Hardington Vale benefice within the Frome deanery.

== See also ==
- Grade I listed buildings in Mendip
- List of Somerset towers
