= Adolphus Williamson =

English police chief officer (1830–1889)

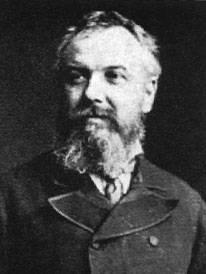
Chief Constable Adolphus Frederick Williamson

Adolphus Frederick "Dolly" Williamson (1830 – 9 December 1889) was a British policeman. He was the first head of the Detective Branch of the Metropolitan Police and the first head of the Detective Branch's successor organisation, the Criminal Investigation Department (CID). He joined the force in 1850 and eventually became Chief Constable.

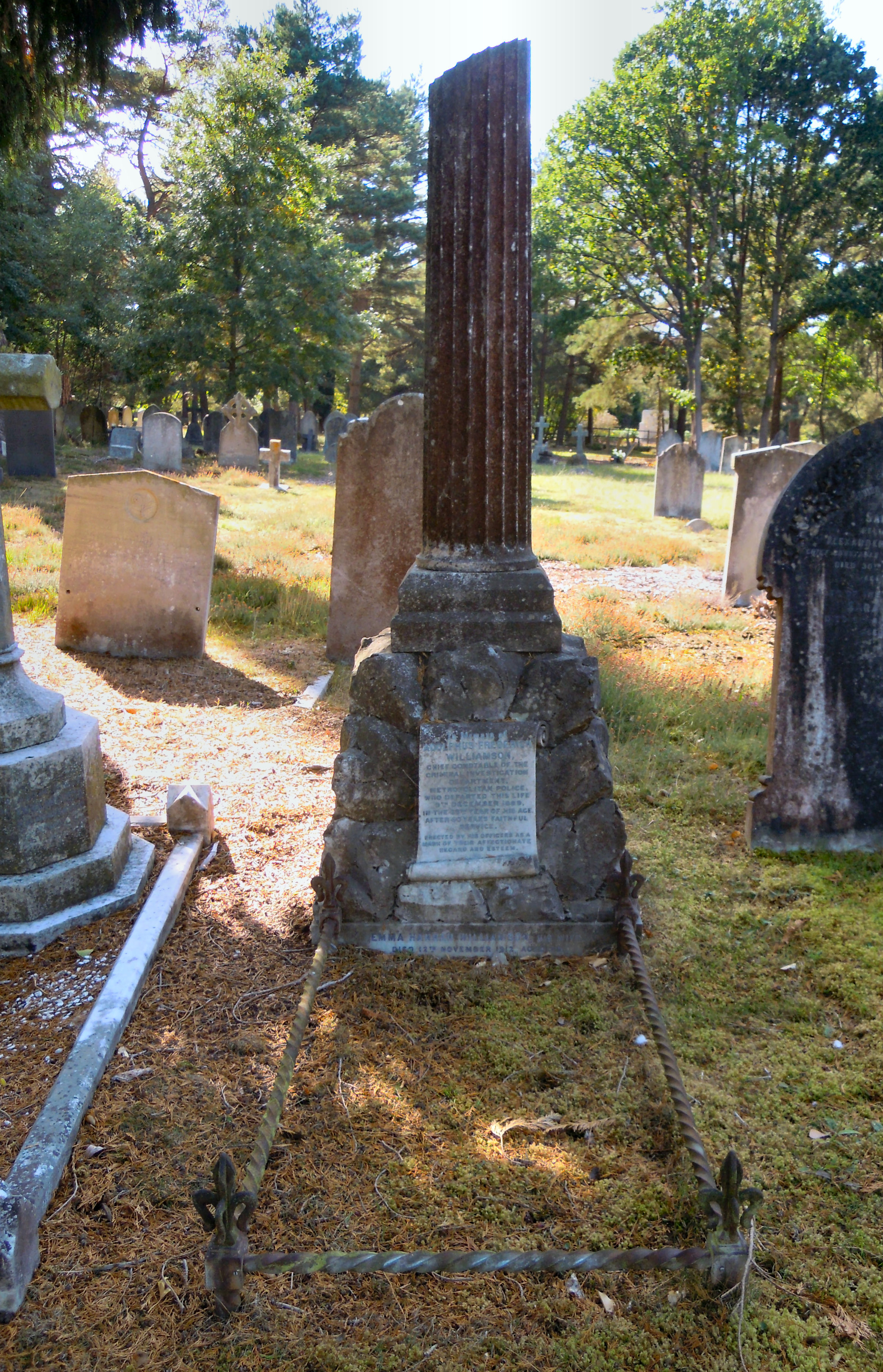
The grave of Adolphus Williamson in Brookwood Cemetery

Williamson was buried in Brookwood Cemetery in Surrey.

In the television films The Suspicions of Mr Whicher (2011) and The Suspicions of Mr Whicher II (2013) he was played by William Beck.

In the Steampunk book series The Guild Chronicles by J.M. Bannon, Williamson is used as a character. The prequel to the series is titled "The Untold Tales of Dolly Williamson" and is a fictional story of the detective's involvement in solving a crime with a supernatural killer.
