= Rode, Somerset =

Village and civil parish in Somerset, England

Coordinates: 51.285°N 2.281°W

Rode
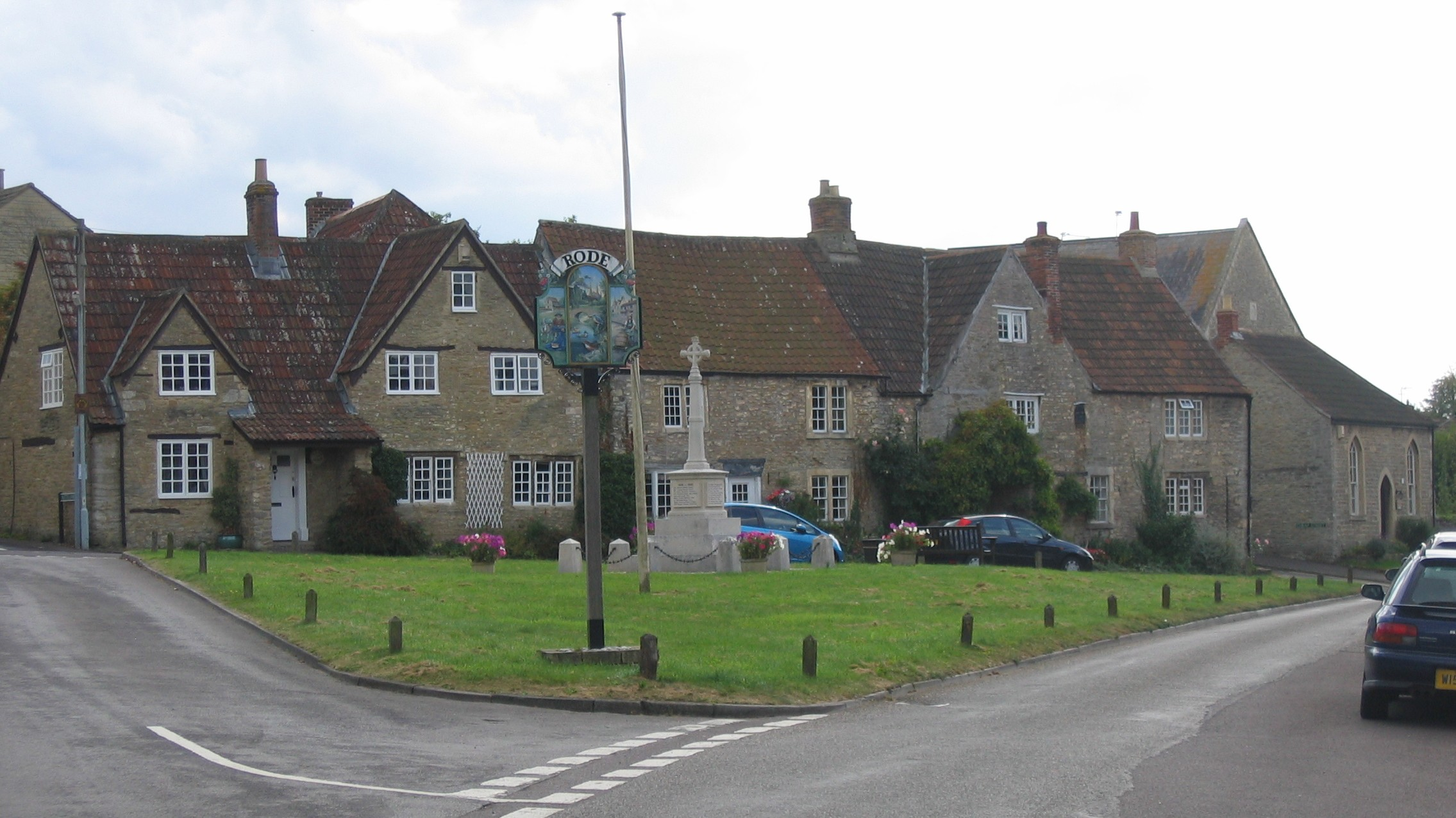
- Village centre

- Location within Somerset
- Population: 1,025 (2011)
- OS grid reference: ST805540
- Unitary authority: Somerset Council
- Ceremonial county: Somerset
- Region: South West
- Country: England
- Sovereign state: United Kingdom
- Post town: Frome
- Postcode district: BA11
- Dialling code: 01373
- Police: Avon and Somerset
- Fire: Devon and Somerset
- Ambulance: South Western
- UK Parliament: Frome and East Somerset

Rode (formerly Road) is a village and civil parish in the ceremonial county of Somerset in England, 5 miles (8.0 km) north-east of Frome and 5 miles (8.0 km) south-west of Trowbridge.

The small settlement of Rode Hill, north-east of Rode village, is now contiguous with it. The village lies within a mile of the Wiltshire border and is the easternmost settlement in Somerset. The Wiltshire village of Southwick is 2 miles (3 km) to the north-east.

== History ==
The village appears as "Rode" in the Domesday Book, but the spelling was labile from an early date: it is "Roda" in assize rolls of 1201, "la Rode" in a charter roll of 1230; by the 18th century "Road" was regarded as the usual form. This was reverted to the older spelling "Rode" by Somerset County Council in 1919. The name derives from the Anglo-Saxon rod, meaning a clearing. The parish was part of the hundred of Frome.

Rode developed from being an early crossing point of the river Frome to a large village of three manors and several mills at the time of the Norman invasion. By 1250 Rode was awarded the privilege of holding a weekly market and annual fair. The main settlement is close to the river but there is also a cluster of houses further east around St. Lawrence's church, near Seymour's Court, the Lord of the Manor's house.

Rode's prominence was greatest during the 16th and 17th centuries, when the wool milling industry boomed in the South West; a success due largely to the meandering nature of its rivers, which afforded the space for the construction of mill ponds and streams, and because of its close proximity to the international port of Bristol. At one point Rode was home to four or five wool mills which created great wealth for the village and funded the construction of many large houses in the village, such as Rode Manor, Langham House, Merfield House and Southfield House. During the 16th, 17th and 18th centuries the village centre thrived enough for Rode to be known as a market town.

Possibly the greatest achievement of Rode's milling industry came in the 18th century, when a consortium of Rode mills won a competition to make a robe for Queen Charlotte. In winning the prize, a business in the village invented the dye Royal Blue and received a certificate to sell it under that name.

By the middle to the end of the 19th century, the wool mills of Rode were struggling, like many in the South West region, as a result of both the Industrial Revolution and the invention of steam power, which caused mills to move to northern industrial centres.

Rode Hill was transferred from Wiltshire to Somerset in 1937. Rode is now largely a dormitory village, offering good access to Bristol, Bath, Trowbridge and Frome.

=== The murder at Road Hill House ===
Rode was the scene of one of the most infamous murders of the 19th century when Constance Kent was arrested by order of the town magistrates for the murder of her 3-year-old half-brother at Road Hill House (now Langham House). The case was investigated by Detective Inspector Jack Whicher. Although released at her committal hearing, Kent was later to confess, was charged and received the mandatory death sentence. This was commuted to life imprisonment, of which she served twenty years.

== Governance ==
The parish council has responsibility for local issues, including setting an annual precept (local rate) to cover the council's operating costs and producing annual accounts for public scrutiny. The parish council evaluates local planning applications and works with the local police, district council officers, and neighbourhood watch groups on matters of crime, security, and traffic. The parish council's role also includes initiating projects for the maintenance and repair of parish facilities, as well as consulting with the district council on the maintenance, repair, and improvement of highways, drainage, footpaths, public transport, and street cleaning. Conservation matters (including trees and listed buildings) and environmental issues are also the responsibility of the council.

For local government purposes, since 1 April 2023, the parish comes under the unitary authority of Somerset Council. Prior to this, it was part of the non-metropolitan district of Mendip (established under the Local Government Act 1972). It was part of Frome Rural District before 1974.

The village falls in the 'Rode and Norton St Philip' electoral ward. The ward has its northern edge in Norton St Philip, then it stretches south through Rode to Lullington. The total population of the ward taken at the 2011 census was 2,227.

It is also part of the Frome and East Somerset county constituency represented in the House of Commons of the Parliament of the United Kingdom. It elects one Member of Parliament (MP) by the first past the post system of election.

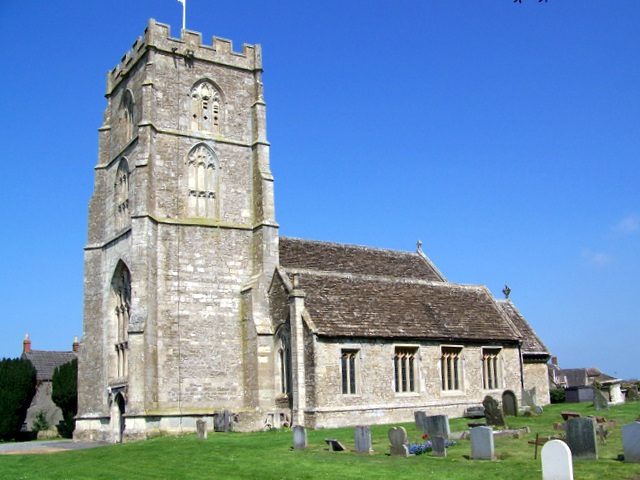
Church of St Lawrence, Rode

== Religious sites ==
The Church of St Lawrence dates from the late 14th and early 15th century. It was restored in 1874 by Charles Edward Davis and is a Grade I listed building. There is also a Baptist-Methodist chapel, dating from 1809, which has Grade II listed building status for the gates and walls.

Christ Church at Rode Hill was built in 1824 but was declared redundant in 1995 and is now a house and violin shop.

== Landmarks ==
Rode is home to two village pumps, a mounted plough, a wellhead pump, an elaborate village sign, a flagpole and a war memorial in the form of a cross. The latter three are on the village green.

A three-arch packhorse bridge crosses the River Frome. It is 48 inches (1,200 mm) wide and has a total span of 63 feet (19 m).

== Amenities ==
Facilities in the village include a village school, pre-school, shop/post office, physiotherapy and acupuncture clinic, chocolate factory, recreation ground and a cricket club, which was founded in about 1895.

There used to be several mills in the village, one of which has now been converted into the Mill pub. Other pubs in Rode are the Cross Keys and the Bell. Until 1962, the village was home to Fussell's Brewery, which grew up behind the Cross Keys Inn. It continued to be used as a bottling plant and distribution depot by Bass until 1992. The site was eventually sold off to a housing developer despite strong opposition from residents, as was the site of Rode Tropical Bird Gardens, an animal sanctuary and small zoo, which closed its doors to the public in 2001.
