= Priest–penitent privilege in England =

Lack of secrecy of religious confession in English courts

The doctrine of priest–penitent privilege does not appear to apply in English law. The orthodox view is that under the law of England and Wales privileged communication exists only in the context of legal advice obtained from a professional adviser. A statement of the law on priest–penitent privilege is contained in the nineteenth century case of Wheeler v. Le Marchant:

In the first place, the principle protecting confidential communications is of a very limited character. [...] There are many communications, which, though absolutely necessary because without them the ordinary business of life cannot be carried on, still are not privileged. [...] Communications made to a priest in the confessional on matters perhaps considered by the penitent to be more important than his life or his fortune, are not protected.

— Sir George Jessel MR, Wheeler v Le Marchant (1881) 17 Ch.D 681

== Justification of the rule ==
The foundation of the rule protecting communications to attorneys and counsel was stated by Henry Brougham, 1st Baron Brougham and Vaux, Lord Chancellor, in an exhaustive judgment on the subject in the case of Greenough v. Gaskell (1833) 1 Mylne & Keen 103, to be the necessity of having the aid of men skilled in jurisprudence for the purpose of the administration of justice. It was not, he said, on account of any particular importance which the law attributed to the business of people in the legal profession or of any particular disposition to afford them protection, though it was not easy to see why a like privilege was refused to others, especially to medical advisers.

A similar opinion was expressed by Sir George James Turner, Vice-Chancellor in the case of Russell v. Jackson (1851) 9 Hare 391, in the following words:

It is evident that the rule which protects from disclosure confidential communications, between solicitor and client does not rest simply upon the confidence reposed by the client in the solicitor, for there is no such rule in other cases, in which, at least, equal confidence is reposed: in the cases, for instance, of the medical adviser and the patient, and of the clergyman and the prisoner.

Moreover, in the relationship of lawyer and client the privilege was confined to communications between them made in respect of the particular litigation and it did not extend to communications generally passing between a client and his lawyer professionally. But the principle has developed so as now to include all professional communications passing in a professional capacity, and to the information and belief founded thereon, see: Minet v. Morgan (1873) 8 Chancery Appeals, 366; Lyell v. Kennedy (1883) 9 AC 90. In the former case Roundell Palmer, 1st Earl of Selborne, Lord Chancellor, said:

There can be no doubt that the law of the Court as to this class of cases did not at once reach a broad and reasonable footing, but reached it by successive steps, founded upon that respect for principle which usually leads the Court aright.

Various commissions on law reform have opposed any extension to the current scope of professional privilege.

== History ==
=== Pre-reformation ===
Before the Reformation, England was a Roman Catholic country and the canon law was the law of England. Thus the seal of the confessional had great import in the secular courts.

=== From Reformation to nineteenth century ===
During the Reformation, the Church of England was established when King Henry VIII broke from the Roman Catholic Church. The respect of the courts for the Seal of the Confessional was less compelling during this period. During the trial of Henry Garnet, for conspiracy in the Gunpowder Plot, the defence that the plot had been communicated to him by Robert Catesby under the Seal of the Confessional was not rejected out of hand by the court, perhaps a surprising decision given the political climate.

=== Confession and the Anglican Church ===
There has never been any UK legislation, one way or the other, about the disclosure in evidence of religious confession. If the privilege had ceased to be part of the common law, legislation would be necessary to re-establish it. If it survived in the common law it can only have done so through the allowance of it in the case of the Church of England, from where it may be possible to argue its extension to other creeds.

=== The civil courts ===
It was decided by the Court of King's Bench in a judgment delivered by Philip Yorke, 1st Earl of Hardwicke in the case of Middleton v Croft that the Canons of 1603, though binding on the clergy, do not bind the laity. The reason for this is that though canons, in order to be valid must, as these did, receive the royal sanction, they are made in convocation, and, thus, without representation of the laity. Accordingly, if this canon infringed a right enjoyed by the lay subjects of the realm it would, seemingly, in as far as it did so, not be valid against them. Thus, a canon purporting to forbid clergymen from appearing as witnesses in any action which a subject might lawfully bring in the King's courts would, seemingly, be void as against the subject.

The fundamental principle is that a witness shall give in evidence the whole truth that he knows concerning the matter in dispute, and that the parties to the dispute are entitled to have that evidence given. The rules which regulate and which, in certain exceptional cases, restrict the giving of evidence are the growth of practice and of the rulings of judges, occurring mainly within the last two to three centuries (see the judgment of Parke B in the case of R v Ryle, 9 M. & W., 244). The rule of public interest immunity which excludes evidence, the requiring of which would be contrary to public policy, as may occur in relation to the conduct of the business of a state department, is an instance. In view of the absolute repudiation by the state of the jurisdiction of the Catholic Church and in view of the abandonment of the sacrament of confession as practised before the Reformation, one may fairly presume that, from the date of that event, confession would no longer have been regarded as a ground from motives of public policy, entitling to an exemption from the principle of the disclosure of all the truth known about the cause, were it to be civil or criminal.

=== Important cases and decisions ===
==== Du Barré v Livette ====
In the case of Du Barré v Livette (1791) Peake 77, Lord Kenyon again held that the privilege would extend so as to preclude an interpreter between a solicitor and a foreign client from giving evidence of what had passed.

In the report of that case the plaintiff's counsel informed the court that Mr. Justice Buller had recently tried on circuit a case (R v Sparkes) and that the prisoner, in that case, was a "papist" and that it came out at the trial that he had made a confession of his capital crime to a protestant clergyman. This confession had been received in evidence by the judge and the prisoner was convicted and executed. The Catholic Encyclopedia contends that it is "obvious" that neither of the parties could have regarded the confession as sacramental. Lord Kenyon said that he would have paused before admitting such evidence, adding

But this case differs from it. The Popish religion is now no longer known to the law of this country, nor was it necessary for the prisoner to make that confession to aid him in his defence. But the relation between attorney and client is as old as the law itself.

==== Butler v Moore ====
In this case from 1802 a priest was imprisoned for contempt of court for refusing to answer whether John Butler, 12th Baron Dunboyne, professed the Catholic faith at the time of his death. Statute would have nullified Lord Dunboyne's will had such been the case. Butler v Moore was an Irish case (Ireland at the time formed part of the United Kingdom, but had a separate legal system).

==== R v Redford ====
In 1823, in the case of R v Redford, which was tried before William Draper Best, 1st Baron Wynford, Chief Justice of the Common Pleas on circuit, when a Church of England clergyman was about to give in evidence a confession of guilt made to him by the prisoner, the judge checked him and indignantly expressed his opinion that it was improper for a clergyman to reveal a confession.

==== R v Gilham ====
The case of R v Gilham (1828) 1 Mood CC 186, CCR, concerned the admission of evidence against a prisoner of an acknowledgment of his guilt which had been induced by the ministrations and words of the Protestant prison chaplain. The acknowledgment of the murder with which he was charged was made by the prisoner to the jailer and, subsequently, to the authorities.

The Catholic Encyclopedia contends that he appears to have made no acknowledgment of his crime to the chaplain himself and that the question of confessional privilege did not arise.

==== Broad v Pitt ====
In 1828, the case of Broad v Pitt 3 C&P 518, where the privilege of communications to an attorney was under discussion, Best CJ said:

The privilege does not apply to clergymen since the decision the other day in the case of Gilham [supra]. I, for one, will never compel a clergyman to disclose communications made to him by a prisoner: but if he chooses to disclose them, I shall receive them in evidence.

==== R v Shaw ====
In R v Shaw (1834) 6 C& P 392, a witness who had taken an oath not to reveal a statement which had been made to him by the prisoner, was ordered to reveal it. "Everybody", said Mr. Justice Patteson, who tried the case, "except counsel and attorneys, is compellable to reveal what they may have heard."

==== Greenlaw v King ====
In the case of Greenlaw v King (1838) 1 Beav 145, Henry Bickersteth, 1st Baron Langdale, Master of the Rolls said:

The cases of privilege are confined to solicitors and their clients; and stewards, parents, medical attendants, clergymen, and persons in the most closely confidential relation, are bound to disclose communications made to them.

==== R v Griffin ====
In R v Griffin (1853) 6 Cox CC 219, a Church of England workhouse chaplain was called to prove conversations with a prisoner charged with child-murder whom, he stated, he had visited in a spiritual capacity. The judge, Baron of the Exchequer Sir Edward Hall Alderson, strongly intimated to counsel that he thought such conversations ought not to be given in evidence, saying that there was an analogy between the necessity for privilege in the case of an attorney to enable legal evidence to be given and that in the case of the clergyman to enable spiritual assistance to be given. He added, "I do not lay this down as an absolute rule: but I think such evidence ought not to be given".

==== The Constance Kent Case ====
In 1865, the murder trial of Constance Kent aroused a number of parliamentary questions whose answers reaffirmed the limited scope of professional privilege in England.

==== R v Hay ====
In this 1860 case, a Catholic priest was committed for contempt of court for failing to give evidence as to how he came by an allegedly stolen watch on the grounds that it came into his possession by way of the confessional. The court insisted that he was asked a plain matter of fact and not to breach the seal of the confessional. The Catholic Encyclopedia suggests that this case supports the view that the confessional is privileged.

==== Ruthven v De Bonn ====
The Catholic Encyclopedia reports the case Ruthven v De Bonn, tried before Mr. Justice Ridley and a jury in 1901.

The defendant, a Catholic priest, having been asked a general question as to the nature of the matters mentioned in sacramental confession, was told by the judge that he was not bound to answer it. The writer was present in court at the hearing of the trial and, as far as his recollection serves him, he understood Mr. Justice Ridley to say something to the effect that the judges had come to this mind in the matter, but the report of the trial in The Times of 8 February 1901, does not contain such a statement. The learned judge said to the plaintiff, who was conducting his case in person: "You are not entitled to ask what questions priests ask in the confessional or the answers given."

— "Seal of the Confessional", The Catholic Encyclopedia

== Alternative views of the law ==
The Catholic Encyclopedia contends that the current view of the law is based on R v Gilham (supra) but contends that the decision has been misconstrued. The encyclopedia goes on to identify some alternative views.

In an anonymous case reported in Skinner's Reports, 404, in 1693, Lord Chief Justice John Holt said that the privilege would extend to a law scrivener, because he would be counsel to a man with whom he would advise. But he is reported to have added "otherwise of a Gentleman, Parson etc." Edward Badeley maintains that Lord Holt did not mean this last assertion to be general and exclusive. This may conceivably be so. It is recorded in another anonymous case, in Lord Raymond's "Reports", 733, that the same judge refused to admit the evidence of a person entrusted by both the parties to the cause to make and keep secret a bargain. He added that "[by him] a trustee should not be a witness in order to betray the trust". But the last decision cannot be said to be in agreement with the law of evidence as generally laid down.

In the case of Wilson v Rastall, as in some other cases, the indication of a potentiality of an expansion of this side of the law of evidence. "I have always understood", Lord Kenyon said, giving judgment, "that the privilege of a client only extends to the case of the attorney for him. Though whether or not it ought to be extended farther, I am happy to think may be inquired into in this cause." He meant that the matter would not be definitely concluded as an appeal would be possible.

It seems to me at least not improbable that, when this question is again raised in an English court of justice, that court will decide it in favour of the inviolability of the confession, and expound the law so as to make it in harmony with that of almost every other Christian state.

— Sir Robert Phillimore, The Ecclesiastical Law of the Church of England

In William Mawdesley Best's work on The Principles of the Law of Evidence there is not only an expression of opinion that the privilege should be accorded, but one to the effect that there is ground for holding that the right to the privilege is existent.

== See also ==
- Seal of the Confessional and the Anglican Church
- Public-interest immunity

== Bibliography ==
- Badeley, Edward (1865). The Privilege of Religious Confessions in English Courts of Justice Considered, in a Letter to a Friend. London: Butterworths.
- Doyle, D. J. (1984). "Religious freedom and Canadian church privileges". Journal of Church and State. 26 (2): 293–311. doi:10.1093/jcs/26.2.293.
- Lord Mackay of Clashfern (ed.) (2002) Halsbury's Laws of England, 4th ed., Criminal Law, Evidence and Procedure, Vol.13 (reissue), Evidence, (5) Privilege, (iii) Legal Professional Privilege, para.1163.
- McNicol, S. B. (1992). Law of Privilege. Sydney: Law Book Co. Ltd. ISBN 0-455-21149-3., Ch.5
