= Absolution =

Traditional theological term for the forgiveness experienced by Penance

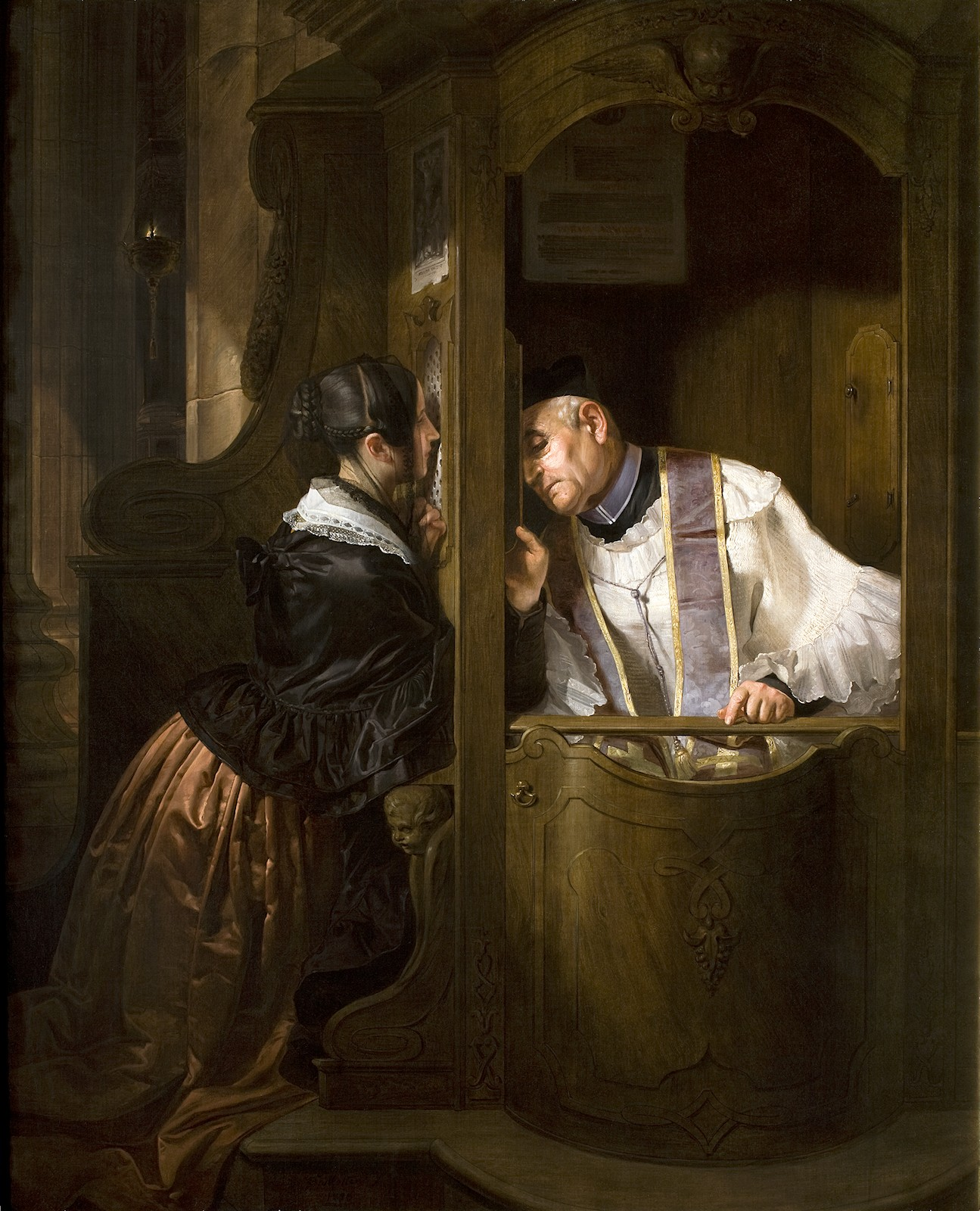
The Confession by Giuseppe Molteni, 1838

Absolution is a theological term for the forgiveness imparted by ordained Christian priests and experienced by Christian penitents. It is a universal feature of the historic churches of Christendom, although the theology and the practice of absolution vary between Christian denominations.

Some Christian traditions see absolution as a sacrament—the Sacrament of Penance. This concept is found in the Catholic Church, Eastern Orthodox Church, Oriental Orthodox Churches, Assyrian Church of the East and the Lutheran Church. In other traditions, including the Anglican Communion and Methodism, absolution is seen as part of the life of the church, with the Thirty-nine Articles and Twenty-five Articles respectively counting absolution amongst the five rites described as "Commonly called Sacraments, but not to be counted for Sacraments of the Gospel". Confession and Absolution is practiced in the Irvingian churches, though it is not a sacrament.

In the Reformed tradition (which includes the Continental Reformed, Presbyterian and Congregationalist denominations), corporate confession is the normative way that this rite is practiced. It is understood as having meaning only for those of congregation who are counted amongst the elect.

== Catholic Church ==
=== Theology of Absolution ===
The Catholic Church teaches both that only God forgives sin and that Jesus Christ, who is God incarnate, willed his ministry of forgiveness of sins to continue through the ministry of his church. "In imparting to his apostles his own power to forgive sins the Lord also gives them the authority to reconcile sinners with the Church."

Thus, the Catholic Church teaches that absolution is one of the acts of the church's ordained minister in the sacrament of Penance wherein a baptized penitent with the proper dispositions can be assured of being forgiven.

Over the centuries the concrete sequence and manner in which the church imparted the absolution of sins varied. In the first centuries, Christians who had committed particular public mortal sins after their Baptism (namely, idolatry, murder, or adultery) seem to have had to confess their sins publicly and do lengthy public penance before they could receive absolution. St. Augustine of Hippo indicates that for non-public sins, there was a private celebration of the sacrament called correptio. Over time, the public confession, penance, and absolution declined such that by the seventh century Irish missionaries spread the practice of privately granted immediate absolution after private confession of sins and before the completion of penance. This manner of receiving absolution became predominant over time. Notably, surviving Roman liturgical books preserve absolution formulas in a deprecatory form, rather than in a first person declarative form.

During the era of Scholasticism, Catholic theologians sought a deeper understanding of the sacrament of Penance and absolution. St. Thomas Aquinas (c.1224–1274) taught: "God alone absolves from sin and forgives sins authoritatively; yet priests do both ministerially, because the words of the priest in this sacrament work as instruments of the Divine power, as in the other sacraments: because it is the Divine power that works inwardly in all the sacramental signs, be they things or words, as shown above (III:62:4; III:64:2). In Summa Theologiae III, q.84 ad3, Aquinas indicated the essential form of absolution which was being used as "I absolve you in the name of the Father, and of the Son, and of the Holy Spirit." However, he seemed to suggest that to the essential words or sacramental form, "I absolve you," a priest, at his discretion, might add "by the power of Christ's Passion," or "by the authority of God" to indicate his ministerial role.

Two subsequent Councils of the Catholic Church reaffirmed the sacramental form of absolution of the Latin Church, namely, the 1439 decree "Pro Armenis" of Pope Eugene IV at the Council of Florence and the fourteenth session of the Council of Trent in 1551 which stated: "The holy synod doth furthermore teach, that the form of the sacrament of penance, wherein its force principally consists, is placed in those words of the minister, I absolve thee, et cetera: to which words indeed certain prayers are, according to the custom of holy Church, laudably joined, which nevertheless by no means regard the essence of that form, neither are they necessary for the administration of the sacrament itself. Post Tridentine theologians including Francisco Suarez, Francisco de Lugo, and Augustin Lehmkuhl taught that the absolution would still be valid if the priest were to merely say, "I absolve you from your sins", or "I absolve you", or words that are the exact equivalent.

Following the Second Vatican Council Pope Paul VI approved a revision of the Rite of Penance. However, the pope again affirmed that the essential words pertaining to the absolution, that is, the form of sacrament necessary for the Sacrament of Penance to take effect, or, in the language of church law to be "sacramentally valid" are: "I absolve you from your sins in the name of the Father, and of the Son, ♱ and of the Holy Spirit.".

As in all sacraments, absolution can only be received by a penitent in the presence of the priest. Some Moral Theologians say the absolution of a penitent more than twenty paces away would be questionably valid. Phone absolutions are considered invalid. An unconscious person who is presumed to want absolution can be conditionally absolved by a priest.

Absolution of sins most importantly forgives mortal sins (and, if one does not commit a mortal sin after having been validly absolved, enables one to die in the "state of grace", able to eventually enter heaven); but it also allows the valid and non-sinful reception of the sacraments (especially the Eucharist at Mass), the lawful exercise of ecclesiastical offices and ministries by laity or clerics, and full participation in the life of the church. However, for certain especially grave sins to be forgiven and for the accompanying church penalties to be lifted, there are sometimes formal processes which must take place along with the absolution, which must then be given (depending on the seriousness of the type of sin) either by the pope (through the Apostolic Penitentiary), the local bishop, or a priest authorized by the bishop.

Absolution forgives the guilt associated with the penitent's sins, and removes the eternal punishment (Hell) associated with mortal sins. The penitent is still responsible for the temporal punishment (Purgatory) associated with the confessed sins, unless an indulgence is applied or, if through prayer, penitence and good works, the temporal punishment is cancelled in this life.

A depiction of the general absolution given to the Royal Munster Fusiliers by Father Francis Gleeson on the eve of the Battle of Aubers Ridge.

=== General absolution ===
General absolution, where all eligible Catholics gathered at a given area are granted absolution for sins without prior individual confession to a priest, is lawfully granted in only two circumstances:

1. there is imminent danger of death and there is no time for a priest or priests to hear the confessions of the individual penitents (e.g., to soldiers before a battle),
2. a serious need is present, that is, the number of penitents is so large that there are not sufficient priests to hear the individual confessions properly within a reasonable time (generally considered to be 1 month) so that the Catholics, through no fault of their own, would be forced to be deprived of the sacrament or communion. The diocesan bishop must give prior permission before general absolution may be given under this circumstance. The occurrence of a large number of penitents, such as may occur on a pilgrimage or at penitential services is not considered as sufficient to permit general absolution. The second circumstance is thus envisaged more for mission territories where priests may visit certain villages only a few times a year, or military campaigns where combatants may not have a priest at a battle site.

For a valid reception of general absolution, the penitent must be contrite for all his mortal sins and have the resolution to confess, at the earliest opportunity, each of those mortal sins forgiven in general absolution. Anyone receiving general absolution is also required to make a complete individual confession to a priest as soon as possible. An historical example is the absolution given by William Corby to the Irish Brigade during the Battle of Gettysburg in 1863. Contemporary examples of general absolution are the Three Mile Island nuclear accident, where general absolution was granted to all Catholics endangered by the incident, and the firefighters, many of whom were Italian and Irish, who were granted general absolution by local priests before heading into the burning World Trade Towers on September 11, 2001.

The proper belief of imminent danger of death is a sufficient rationale to administer the rite, even though the actual danger might not actually exist. The general absolution was licitly given by Honolulu Bishop Clarence Richard Silva to people at a church programme during the 2018 Hawaii false missile alert as it was believed that direct nuclear attack from North Korea was imminent.

=== Latin Church ===
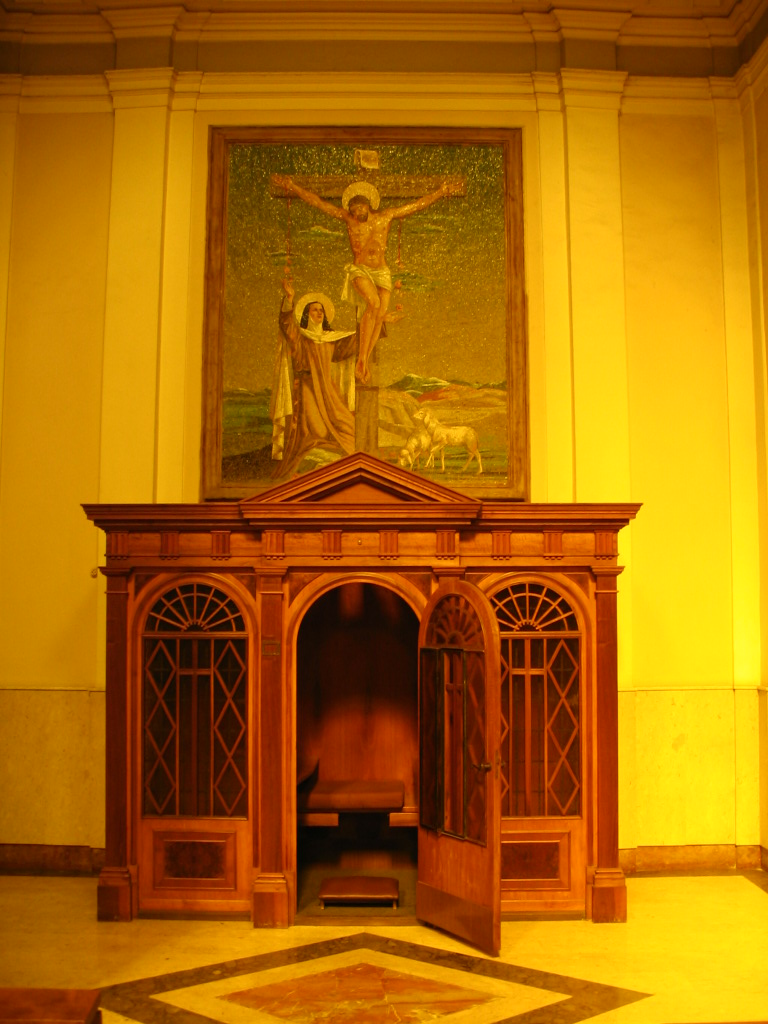
Traditional confessional from Sicily.

Absolution is an integral part of the Sacrament of Penance, in all Catholicism. To validly receive absolution, the penitent must make a sincere sacramental confession of all known mortal sins not yet confessed to a priest and pray an act of contrition (a genre of prayers) which expresses both motives for sorrow and the resolve to not sin again. The priest then assigns a penance and imparts absolution in the name of the Trinity, on behalf of Jesus Christ, using a fixed sacramental formula.

The formula of absolution used in the Pauline Missal, the Ordinary Form of the Roman Rite, is as follows:

God, the Father of mercies, through the death and resurrection of his Son has reconciled the world to himself and sent the Holy Spirit among us for the forgiveness of sins; through the ministry of the Church may God give you pardon and peace, and I absolve you from your sins in the name of the Father, and of the Son, and of the Holy Spirit. Amen.

During a Spring 2021 meeting, the United States Conference of Catholic Bishops (USCCB) made some adjustments to the text to make it a more accurate translation of the original Latin. After the USCCB changes they were approved by the Vatican's Dicastery (then-Congregation) for Divine Worship and the Discipline of the Sacraments in April 2022. The changes took effect on Ash Wednesday 2023 (February 22) and became mandatory on Divine Mercy Sunday 2023 (April 16). The new text is follows:

God, the Father of mercies, through the death and resurrection of his Son has reconciled the world to himself and poured out the Holy Spirit for the forgiveness of sins; through the ministry of the Church may God grant you pardon and peace, and I absolve you from your sins in the name of the Father, and of the Son, ♱ and of the Holy Spirit. Amen.

There is a separate form used for the lifting of excommunications and interdicts in the Pauline Missal; in the older form, the lifting of excommunications and interdicts is part of the same formula as that of the absolution. The older form approved for the Roman Ritual after the Council of Trent, the Extraordinary Form of the Roman Rite, is as follows:

May our Lord Jesus Christ absolve you; and I, by His authority, absolve you from every bond of excommunication (suspension) and interdict, in as much as I am able and you require. Thereupon, I absolve you from your sins in the name of the Father, and of the Son, ♱ and of the Holy Spirit. Amen.

Both forms start with a deprecative absolution in the third person subjunctive, and then conclude with a first person indicative declarative absolution. This highlights the priest's God given authority as father, physician, teacher, and especially as judge with the power to bind and loosen.

The older prays that Christ absolve, then the priest absolves by Christ's authority and in the name of the three persons of the Holy Trinity. The newer prayer implies that "God the Father" or Trinity absolves when the priest prays that God might give pardon and peace, without using the word absolve, through the ministry of the church.

==== Ancillary Formulas ====
This formula is preceded by two short prayers similar to those used at Extraordinary Form of the Mass after the Confiteor. First the priest prays, "May almighty God have mercy on you, and having forgiven your sins, lead you to eternal life. Amen." followed by "May the almighty and merciful Lord grant you indulgence, absolution, and remission of your sins. Amen." Both of these can be omitted for a just reason.

Another prayer which was prescribed, but could be omitted for a just cause in the pre-1970 Ritual is a short prayer for the spiritual well-being of the penitent which some priests still use when using the absolution approved by Pope Paul VI: "May the Passion of Our Lord Jesus Christ, the merits of the Blessed Virgin Mary and of all the saints and also whatever good you do or evil you endure be cause for the remission of your sins, the increase of grace and the reward of life everlasting. Amen." This prayer shows the concepts of merit and the Communion of Saints in the greater context of grace as understood in Catholic theology.

==== Funeral Rites ====
The Roman Rite has other prayers for forgiveness which are not considered sacramental absolutions. For example, the absolution of the dead is a series of prayers said after the Requiem Mass, that is the Funeral Mass. The prayers are in the form of a collect (with a short ending when the body is not present). The absolution of the dead does not forgive sins or confer the sacramental absolution of the Sacrament of Penance. Rather, it is a series of prayers offered and united with the Holy Sacrifice of the Mass, beseeching God that His Son's perfect sacrifice and prayers be accepted to aid the deliverance of the person's soul from suffering the temporal punishment in Purgatory due for sins which were forgiven during the person's life. The absolution of the dead used in the Tridentine Mass is:

Let us pray. God, to Whom it is proper is always to have mercy and to spare, we humbly entreat You for the soul of Your servant N., whom You have commanded today to go forth from this world: that You would not deliver him (her) into the hands of the enemy, nor forget him (her) forever, but command him (her) to be taken up by the holy Angels, and to be led to our homeland of paradise, so that since he (she) had believed and hoped in You, he (she) may not undergo the pains of hell, but may possess eternal joys. Through our Lord Jesus Christ, Thy Son, Who lives and reigns with You in the unity of the Holy Spirit, God, forever and ever. Amen.

When the body is a not present, a different absolution prayer used is:

Let us pray. Absolve, we ask, O Lord, the soul of Your servant N., so that dead to the world he (she) live for You: and whatever through the frailty of the flesh he (she) committed through human interaction, wipe away by the forgiveness of Your most merciful piety. Through Christ our Lord. Amen.

==== Non-sacramental absolutions ====
Prayers of absolution with various prescribed wordings may also be offered by priests to groups of people outside of a mass.

Each Nocturn of the Office of Matins of the pre-Liturgy of the Hours Roman Breviary contains a short absolution the prescribed psalm.

=== Eastern Catholic Churches ===
The Catholic Church also includes twenty-three Eastern Catholic Churches sui iuris, which are in union with the Latin Catholic Church but retain their own distinct rites and customs, among which are included prayers of absolution.

==== Byzantine Catholic Churches ====
The Byzantine Rite derives originally from Antioch but developed in the city of Constantinople and then spread to the Slavic lands.

===== Ruthenian Greek Catholic Church =====
In the Ruthenian Church, the priest places his epitrachilion (stole) over the penitent's head and imposes his hands, while saying the prayer of absolution:

May our Lord and God, Jesus Christ, through the grace and mercies of his love for humankind, forgive you all your transgressions. And I, an unworthy priest, by his power given me, forgive and absolve you from all your sins, in the name of the Father and of the Son and of the Holy Spirit. Amen.

An alternate prayer of absolution possible is:

May God, who pardoned David through Nathan the prophet, when he confessed his sins, and Peter weeping bitterly for his denial, and the sinful woman weeping at his feet, and the publican and the prodigal son, may that same God forgive you everything through me, a sinner, both in this world and in the world to come, and set you uncondemned before his terrible judgment seat. Having no further care for the sins you have confessed, go in peace.

====== Rutheninan non-sacramental absolutions ======
In the Ruthenian Office of Christian Burial there is a non-sacramental "prayer of absolution" of the dead at the cemetery as follows:

May our Lord and God, Jesus Christ, Who has given His divine authority to His holy Disciples and Apostles to bind and loose the sins of the fallen, and from whom, in turn, we have received the obligation to do likewise, forgive you, spiritual child, N., whatever you have committed in your life deliberately or through human frailty, now and forever. Amen.

===== Ukrainian Greek Catholic Church =====
The Ukrainian Greek Catholic Church prescribes a similar form in English. The priest may place his epitrachelion (stole) over the penitent's head and makes the sign of the cross on his or her head, then says:

May our Lord and God, Jesus Christ, by the grace and mercies of His love for us, pardon you, my child, N., all your faults, and I, an unworthy priest, by His authority given me, pardon and absolve you of all your sins, in the name of the ♱ Father and of the Son and of the Holy Spirit. Amen.

===== Melkite Greek Catholic Church =====
In the Melkite Greek Catholic Church, after the penitent confesses his sins, the priest may say some words and assigns a penance. Then, he raises his right hand over the head of the penitent and pronounces the words of absolution:

Our Lord and God Jesus Christ, Who gave this command to His divine and holy disciples and apostles; to loose and to bind the sins of people, forgives you from on high, all your sins and offenses. I, His unworthy servant, who have received from these Apostles the power to do the same, absolve you from all censures, in as much as I can and am able, according to your need of it. Moreover, I absolve you from all your sins which you have confessed before God and my unworthiness. In the name ♱ of the Father, and of the Son, and the Holy Spirit. Amen.

The following may be said by the priest, but is not required for absolution:

God, through Nathan the prophet, forgave David his sins; and Peter shedding bitter tears over his denial; and the Adulteress weeping at his feet; and the Publican and the Prodigal Son. May this same God, through me, a sinner, forgive + you everything in this life and in the life to come. And may you stand uncondemned before His awesome judgment-seat, for His Name is blessed forever and ever. Amen.

====== Melkite non-sacramental absolutions ======
In the Melkite "Order of Funeral for the Dead" there is a non-sacramental absolution of the dead:

Let us ask the mercies of God, the kingdom of heaven, and the forgiveness of his (her) sins through Christ, our immortal King and God. Let us pray to the Lord. Lord have mercy.

O God of all spirits and all flesh, Who have destroyed death, overcome the Devil, and given life to the world: grant, O Lord, to the soul of your servant N., who has departed from this life, that it may rest in a place of light, in a place of happiness, in a place of peace, where there is no pain, no grief, no sighing. And since You are a gracious God and the Lover of mankind, forgive him (her) every sin he (she) has committed by thought, or word, or deed, for there is not a man who lives and does not sin: You alone are without sin, Your righteousness is everlasting, and Your word is true. You are the Resurrection and the Life, and the Repose of Your departed servant (or handmaid), N., O Christ our God, and we give glory to You, together with Your eternal Father and Your all-holy, good, and life-giving Spirit, now and always and forever and ever. Amen.

==== Non-Byzantine Catholic churches ====
The following prayers are utilized by Eastern Catholic Churches which adhere to the Alexandrian, Western Syrian, or Eastern Syrian rites.

===== Coptic Catholic Church =====
The Coptic Catholic Church uses the "Absolution of the Son" as the form of sacramental absolution.

===== Maronite Church =====
While the Maronite Church previously had its own native forms of absolution, the current practice is to use the form of the Roman Rite developed after the Second Vatican Council.

===== Syro-Malabar Catholic Church =====
The Syro-Malabar Catholic Church follows the Malabar Rite. After the penitent confesses his or her sins and the priest gives timely advice and a penance, the priest has a few optional absolution prayers to choose from. Stretching out his right hand over the penitent, he says:

By the grace of the Lord who sanctifies the repentant sinners, you are absolved of all your sins. In the name of the Father and of the Son ♱ of the Holy Spirit. Amen.
This prayer uses the passive voice and indicative mood to declare the person forgiven. Another option, uses the active voice and subjunctive mood to pray that the person may be forgiven.
May the Lord, who sanctifies the repentant sinners, absolve you from your sins and make you worthy of eternal life. In the name of the Father and of the Son ♱ and of the Holy Spirit. Amen.

A third option is in the active voice with an imperative or command:

Lord, You who take away the sins and sanctify the sinner, graciously wash away the stains of this servant and make him (her) clean. By Your grace, freed from all sins, may he (she) be found worthy of eternal life. Now, always ♱ and forever. Amen.

After the absolution, the priest continues with a blessing:

May God, who made you reconciled with Himself, bless you to live in communion with the Church and your brethren. May He help you carry out the renewal of life you have begun. Go in peace.

Meanwhile, there is still another prayer for giving absolution to someone in danger of death which uses a deprecative form:

May the Lord, who sanctifies the repentant sinners, forgive your sins and make you worthy of eternal life. In the name of the Father and of the Son ♱ and of the Holy Spirit. Amen.

===== Chaldean Catholic Church =====
Before their recent reform of their Liturgy, Chaldean Catholics used the form of absolution from the Roman Ritual, but translated into Syriac.

== Eastern Orthodox Church ==
The Eastern Orthodox Church has always believed that the church has power to forgive sin from Christ. This is made clear by the formulæ of absolution in vogue among all branches within Eastern Orthodoxy, and also since the time of the Protestant Reformation in the decrees of the Synod of Constantinople in 1638, the Synod of Jassy in 1642, and the Synod of Jerusalem in 1672. The Orthodox also reaffirmed the sacrament in response to the heresy of Patriarch Cyril Lucaris III of Constantinople. In the Synod of Jerusalem the Orthodox Bishops reaffirmed its belief in Seven Sacraments, among them Penance, which Jesus Christ is believed to have established when he said to the Apostles on the evening of His Resurrection: "Whose sins you shall forgive they are forgiven them, and whose sins you shall retain they are retained."

=== Greek ===
The service in the Byzantine Church is often attributed to Patriarch of Constantinople, John the Faster (AD 582–595). However, it dates rather from the 11th century. The absolution, as in the present Greek Euchologion, uses the deprecative form to stress that it is God who primarily forgives through the priest. After questioning the penitent in line with the tradition of the Kanonaria lists in front of an iconostasis, the priest prays:

My spiritual child, N., who have confessed to my humble person, I, humble and a sinner, have not power on earth to forgive sins, but God alone; but through that divinely spoken word which came to the Apostles after the Resurrection of our Lord Jesus Christ, saying, Whosesoever sins you forgive are forgiven, and whosesoever sins you retain are retained, we are emboldened to say: Whatsoever you have said to my humble person, and whatsoever you have failed yo say, whether through ignorance or forgetfulness, whatever it may be, may God forgive you in this world and in that which is to come.

The priest adds:

May God Who pardoned David through Nathan the Prophet when he confessed his sins, and Peter weeping bitterly for his denial, and the sinful woman weeping at His feet, and the publican and the prodigal son; May that same God forgive you all things, through me a sinner, both in this world and in the world to come, and set you uncondemned before His terrible Judgment Seat. (In the name ♱ of the Father, and of the Son, and of the Holy Spirit.) Have no further care for the sins which you have confessed, depart in peace.

Casimir Kucharek asserts that although Greek Orthodox priests generally use the form attributed to John the Faster, they are also at liberty to compose their own formula.

=== Slavonic ===
The Russian and other Orthodox whose official liturgical language is Church Slavonic., while holding the same theology as the Greeks, have, since the time of Metropolitan Peter Mogila's Trebnik (Ritual) of 1646, employed the indicative form of absolution after a deprecative prayer.

After confessing all sins committed, the penitent bows his head and the priest, says the following prayer to prepare for the absolution:

O Lord God, the salvation of Your servants, merciful, compassionate and long-suffering; Who repent concerning our evil deeds, not desiring the death of a sinner, but that he (she) should turn from him (her) evil ways and live. Show mercy now on Your servant N. and grant to him (her) an image of repentance, forgiveness of sins and deliverance, pardoning all his (her) sins, whether voluntary or involuntary. Reconcile and unite him (her) to Your Holy [Catholic and Apostolic Church] through Jesus Christ our Lord, to Whom, with You, are due dominion and majesty, now and ever and unto ages of ages.

Then, the penitent kneels, and the priest laying his stole upon the penitent's head pronounces the following absolution:

May our Lord and God, Jesus Christ, by the grace and compassion of His love for mankind, forgive you, my child, N., all your transgressions. And I His unworthy Priest, through the power given me, forgive and absolve you from all your sins, ♱ in the Name of the Father, and of the Son, and of the Holy Spirit. [Now, having no further care for the sins which you have confessed. depart in peace, knowing such sins are as far from you as the East is from the West.] Amen.

== Oriental Orthodox Churches ==
The Oriental Orthodox Churches are Eastern Christian churches which recognize only the first three ecumenical councils—the First Council of Nicaea, the First Council of Constantinople and the First Council of Ephesus. Often called Monophysite by the Catholic and Eastern Orthodox, the Oriental Orthodox reject this description as inaccurate, having rejected the teachings of both Nestorius and Eutyches. They prefer to be called Miaphysite.

Although not in communion with the Catholic, Eastern Orthodox, or Assyrian churches, ecumenical dialogues with The Oriental Orthodox Churches have led to common declarations concerning shared doctrines. The Armenian, Coptic, Ethiopian, Malankara, and Syriac Orthodox churches are in full communion with each other, but have slight variations in their practice and teaching on absolution and penance.

=== Armenian Orthodox ===
Heinrich Joseph Dominicus Denzinger, in his Ritus Orientalium (1863), gives us a full translation from Armenian into Latin of the penitential ritual used by the Armenian Apostolic Church. This version is attested to as far back as the 9th century. Notably, the form of absolution which is declarative, is also preceded by a deprecative prayer for mercy and for forgiveness.

May the merciful Lord have pity on you and forgive you your faults; in virtue of my priestly power, by the authority and command of God expressed in these words, 'whatsoever you shall bind on earth shall be bound in heaven', I absolve you from thy sins, I absolve you from thy thoughts, from your words, from your deeds, in the name of the Father, and of the Son, and of the Holy Spirit, and I restore you to the Sacrament of the Holy Church. May all your good works be for you an increase of merit, may they be for the glory of life everlasting, Amen."

A more modern version is as follows:

May God who loves mankind have mercy on you and forgive all of your sins, both those which you have confessed as well as those which you have forgotten. Therefore, with the priestly authority committed to me and by the Lord’s command that ‘whatever you forgive on earth shall be forgiven in heaven’; by His very word I absolve you of all participation in sin committed in thought, in word, and in deed, in the name of the Father, and of the Son, and of the Holy Spirit, and I reinstate you in the sacraments of the Holy Church, that whatever you may do, may be accounted to you for good and for the glory in the life to come. Amen.

Non-sacramental absolutions

With the Divine Liturgy, just before the administration of the Sacrament of Holy Communion, the priest prays:
Lord have mercy. Lord have mercy. Lord have mercy.
May God who loves mankind have mercy on you and forgive all of your sins, both those which you have confessed, as well as those which you have forgotten. Therefore, with the priestly authority committed to me and by the Lord’s command that “Whatever you forgive on earth shall be forgiven in heaven,” by his very word, I absolve you of all participation in sin, in thought, in word, and in deed, in the name of the Father and of the Son and of the Holy Spirit. And I reinstate you in the sacraments of the holy Church, that whatever you may do may be accounted to you for good and for the glory of the life to come. Amen.

=== Coptic Orthodox ===
Henri Hyvernat asserts that the liturgical books of the Copts have no penitential formulæ, however, this is because the Copts include in the ritual books only those things which are not found in other books. The prayers of sacramental absolution are the same as those which the priest recites at the beginning of the Divine Liturgy.

William du Bernat in his Lettres édifiantes written to Fleurian says, in reference to the Sacrament of Penance among the Copts, that the Copts believe themselves bound to a full confession of their sins. He also remarks that after the absolution by the priest, the same priest adds a "Benediction." Bernat compares this to the prayer to the Passio Domini used in the Roman Rite (see above) after absolution has been imparted. This is rejected by Hyvernat.

After the recitation of psalm 51 and the penitent's confession, the priest, standing, places the cross in his right hand on the confessing person's head, holding their temples between his fingers, and prays three prayers. The first two prayers do not mention absolution, but prepare for it by acts of faith and adoration with a plea for good things.

First:

O Lord, who have given authority unto us to tread upon serpents and scorpions and upon all the power of the enemy, crush his heads beneath our feet speedily, and scatter before us his every design of weakness that is against us. For You are the King of us all, O Christ our God, and to You we send up the glory and the honor and the adoration, with Your good Father and the Holy, life-giving, and consubstantial Spirit, now and at all times, and unto the age of all ages. Amen.

Second:

You, O Lord, who created the heavens, You descended and became man for our salvation. You are He who sits upon the Cherubim and the Seraphim, and beholds them who are lowly. You also now, our Master, are He unto whom we lift up the eyes of our hearts, the Lord who forgives our iniquities and saves our souls from corruption. We worship Your unutterable compassion, and we ask You to give us Your peace, for You have given all things unto us. Acquire us unto Yourself, God our Savior, for we know none other but You; Your Holy Name we do utter. Turn us, God, into fearing You and desiring You. Be pleased that we abide in the enjoyment of Your good things, and those who have bowed their heads beneath Your hand, exalt them in their ways of life, and adorn them with virtues. And may we all be worthy of Your Kingdom in the heavens, through the goodwill of God, Your good Father, with Whom You are blessed with the Holy, Life-giving Spirit, Consubstantial with You, now and forever, and unto the age of all ages. Amen.

The third is properly the "Absolution of the Son." The first part of this prayer is deprecative imploring Christ's forgiveness which was conceded by Him to His Apostles and the priests who have received the apostolic ministry. The final part uses the imperative. The prayer is also used by Coptic Catholics:

Master, Lord Jesus Christ the only-begotten Son and Logos of God the Father, Who has broken every bond of our sins through His saving, life-giving sufferings; Who breathed into the faces of His holy disciples and saintly Apostles, and said to them, “Receive the holy Spirit. Whose sins you will remit, they are remitted to them, and whose sins you will retain, they shall be retained.” Now, our Master, through Your holy apostles, You have also deigned to give grace to their successors in the priestly ministry in the bosom of your Holy Church, the faculty of remitting sins on earth, of binding and to loosing every bond of iniquity. Now, also, we pray and entreat Your goodness, O Lover of Mankind, for Your servant, N., whose head is bowed in the presence of Your Holy Glory, that he (she) may obtain your mercy and that you loose every bond of his (her) sins, which he (she) has committed against You, whether knowingly or unknowingly, or by fear, in word, in deed, or by weakness. You, O Master, who know the weakness of men, as a good and loving God, grant us the forgiveness of our sins ♱ (The priest crosses himself). Bless us, purify us, absolve us and absolve your servant N (The priest crosses the penitent). Fill us with Your fear, and straighten us unto Your holy, good will, for You are our God, and all glory, honor, dominion, and adoration are due unto You, with Your good Father, and the Holy Spirit, Consubstantial with You, now and forever, and unto the age of all ages. Amen.

Non-sacramental Absolutions

The above Absolution of the Son, with slight modification, namely to absolve one penitent rather than a group of people, is part of the Eucharistic Liturgy of Saint Basil. Irenee-Henri Dalmais points out that a common practice is to regard the censing at the beginning of the Eucharistic Liturgy as the sacrament of penance. Worshippers make their confession to the thurible and the priest prays a solemn form of absolution called the "Absolution of the Son." Whichever priest is the main celebrant or the eldest prays the following absolution:

May Thy servants, O Lord, ministering this day, the hegumenos, the priest, the deacons, the clergy, the congregation, and my own weakness, be absolved and blessed from the mouth of the Holy Trinity, the Father, the Son, and the Holy Spirit, from the mouth of the One Holy, Catholic, Apostolic Church, the mouths of the twelve apostles, of the beholder of God, Mark the Evangelist, the holy Apostle and Martyr, of the Patriarch Saint Severus, of our teacher Dioscorus, of Athanasius the Apostolic Saint, of Saint Peter the high- priest and seal of the Martyrs, of Saint John Chrysostom, Saint Cyril, Saint Basil, Saint Gregory, from the mouths of the three hundred and eighteen who met at Nicaea, the one hundred and fifty who met at Constantinople, and the two hundred who met at Ephesus, from the mouth of our honored high-priest and father [Anba ... ] and his assistant in the apostolic ministry, our honored metropolitan [Bishop] and father [Anba ... ], and from the mouth of my own weakness. For blessed and full of glory is Thy Holy Name, the Father, the Son, and the Holy Spirit, now and forever.

Another absolution, called the "Absolution of the Father" is found after the Lord's Prayer which itself follows the Eucharistic Prayer. In this Absolution, the priest prays:

Master, Lord God, the Pantocrator, healer of our souls, our bodies and our spirits, Thou art He who said to our father Peter, through the mouth of Thine Only-begotten Son our Lord, God, and Savior Jesus Christ, “Thou art Peter, and on this rock I build My Church, and the gates of hell shall not prevail against her. I will deliver the keys of the Kingdom of Heaven to thee, what thou bindst on earth shall be bound in heaven, and what thou loosest on earth shall be loosed in heaven.” May, O lord, Thy servants, my fathers, and brethren, and my own weakness, be absolved from my mouth, through Thy Holy Spirit, O good and lover of mankind. O God, who hast borne the sin of the world, vouchsafe to accept the repentance of Thy servants—as a light toward knowledge and remission of sins. For Thou art a kind and merciful God, forbearing, righteous, and compassionate. If we have sinned against Thee in word or in deed, do forgive us, for Thou art good and lover of mankind. Absolve us, O God, and absolve all Thy people [here the priest makes mention of the names of living and dead persons, and himself] of every sin, every curse, every ungratefulness, every false oath, every encounter with ungodly heretics. Bestow upon us, O Lord, a good mind and a power of understanding, to flee from every iniquity till the end, and to do those things which satisfy Thee every time. Write our names together with all the hosts of Thy Saints in the Kingdom of Heaven. Through Jesus Christ, our Lord.

Remember, O Lord, my own weakness and forgive my many sins, and where transgression has abounded, let your grace be multiplied in abundance. Because of my own sins and the abomination of my heart, deprive not your people of the grace of your Holy Spirit. Absolve us and absolve all your people from every sin, from every curse, from every denial, from every false oath, and from every encounter with the heretics and the heathens. O our Lord, grant us a reason, power, and understanding to flee from any evil deed of the adversary, and grant us to do what is pleasing unto you at all times. Inscribe our names with all the choir of your saints in the kingdom of the heavens, in Christ Jesus, our Lord, through whom the glory, the honour, the dominion, and the adoration are due unto you, with him and the holy spirit, the life-giver who is of one essence with you, now and at all times and unto the age of all ages. Amen.

=== Syriac and Malankara Orthodox ===
The Syrians who are united with the Roman See use a relatively recent declarative form in imparting absolution. The present Miaphysite churches, sometimes called Jacobite, of Syria and of India not only teach that their priests have power from Christ to absolve from sin, but their ritual is expressive of this same power. Denzinger in his Ritus Orientalium preserves a 12th-century document which gives in full the order of absolution.

One example of absolution is declarative but in the third person in two petitions invoking Father and Son, respectively, and deprecative in the final invoking the Holy Spirit.

Sin is taken away from your soul and your body in the name of the Father. Amen. You are made clean and holy in the name of the Son. Amen. May you be forgiven and share the holy mysteries in the name of the Holy Spirit (for everlasting life). Amen.

The form currently in use for absolving the laity uses a first person indicative form while the absolution of the clergy is a third person deprecatory form. The Malankara Church which derives from the Syriac Orthodox Church uses the same formula.

To absolve a member of the laity, the priest lays his right hand on the head of the penitent and says:

May God have mercy upon you and guide you to eternal life. By the authority of the sacred priesthood, which was entrusted by our Lord, Jesus Christ, to His disciples, who, in turn, handed it to their successors, until it was given to my humble person. I absolve you, my brother, from all sins that you have confessed and repented of them, as well as all the transgressions that have escaped your memory, in the name of the Father ♱, Son ♱ and Holy Spirit ♱ for ever-lasting life. Amen.

To absolve a member of the clergy, the priest says:

May God, Who blessed his holy disciples, bless you. May He preserve you from all evil deeds and perfect you in the gracious ones that you may be the keeper of His commandments and the fulfiller of His laws. May He make you a chosen vessel that is fit for the service of His glory. May you enjoy peace in Him, and may He be pleased with you and according to His Good Will, may you be blessed, absolved and consecrated, in the Name of the Father ♱, amen, and of the Son ♱, amen and of the Holy Spirit ♱ for everlasting life. Amen.

== Lutheran churches ==
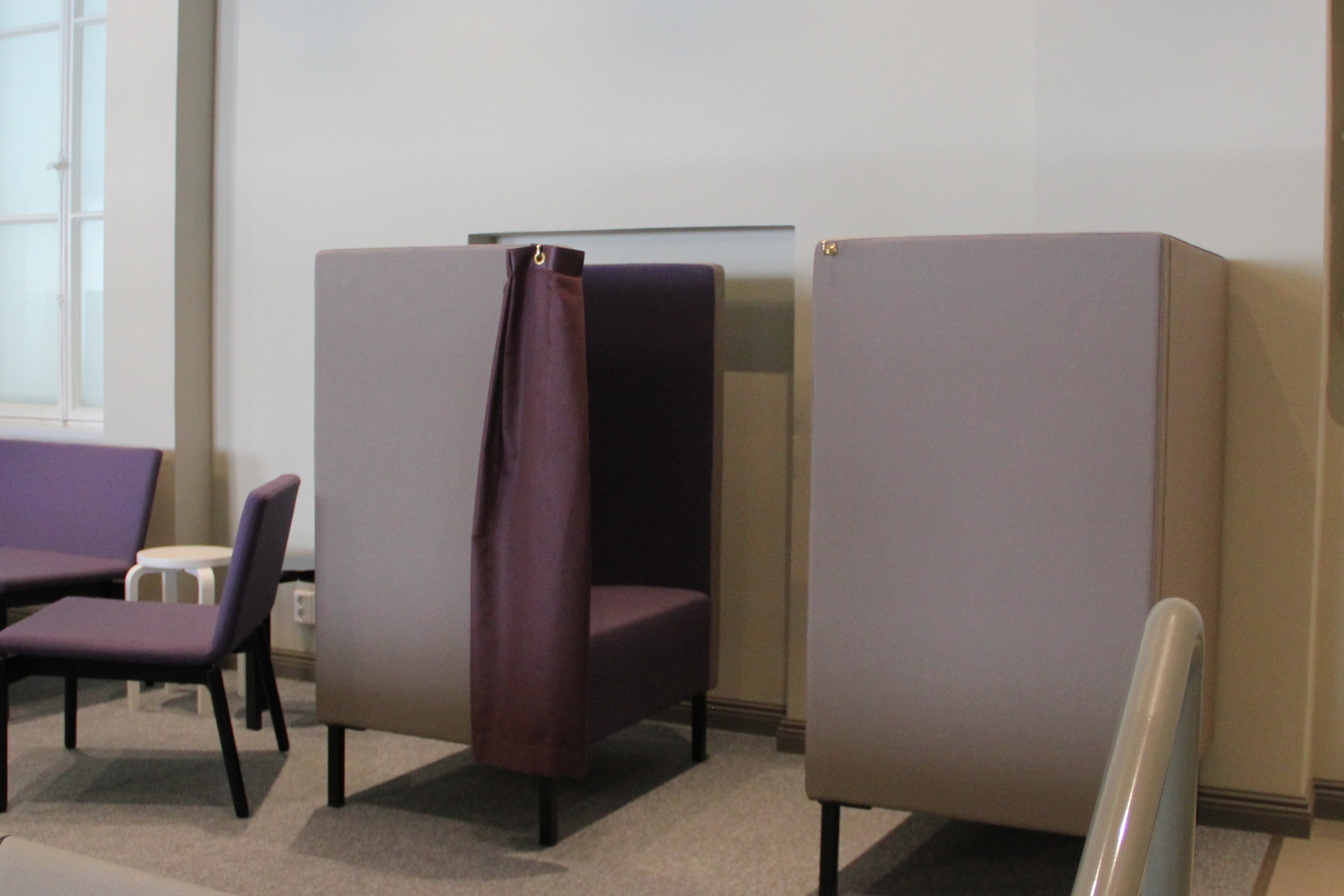
An Evangelical Lutheran confessional in Luther Church (Helsinki, Finland); the Augsburg Confession divides repentance into two parts: "One is contrition, that is, terrors smiting the conscience through the knowledge of sin; the other is faith, which is born of the Gospel, or of absolution, and believes that for Christ's sake, sins are forgiven, comforts the conscience, and delivers it from terrors."

Luther's earliest writings speak of baptism, eucharist, and absolution as three distinct sacraments and in his later works he wrote of absolution also being an extension of the forgiveness expressed and experienced in the sacrament of baptism. The 1529 Large Catechism (and therefore also the 1580 Book of Concord) thus speaks of absolution as "the third Sacrament", stating "And here you see that Baptism, both in its power and signification, comprehends also the third Sacrament, which has been called repentance, as it is really nothing else than Baptism. For what else is repentance but an earnest attack upon the old man (that his lusts be restrained) and entering upon a new life?" Martin Luther praised the practice of confession, and described it as a sacrament in the 1529 exhortation, also writing "Here we should also speak about confession, which we retain and praise as something useful and beneficial".

Today Lutherans practice "confession and absolution" in two forms. They, like Roman Catholics, see James 5:16 and John 20:22–23 as biblical evidence for confession. The first form of confession and absolution is done at the Divine Service with the assembled congregation (similar to the Anglican tradition). Here, the entire congregation pauses for a moment of silent confession, recites the confiteor, and receives God's forgiveness through the pastor as he says the following (or similar): "Upon this your confession and in the stead and by the command of my Lord Jesus Christ, I forgive you all your sins in the name of the Father and of the Son and of the Holy Spirit."

The second form of confession and absolution is known as "Holy Absolution", which is done privately to the pastor (commonly only upon request). Here the person confessing (known as the "penitent") confesses his individual sins and makes an act of contrition as the pastor, acting in persona Christi, announces this following formula of absolution (or similar): "In the stead and by the command of my Lord Jesus Christ I forgive you all your sins in the name of the Father and of the Son and of the Holy Spirit." In the Lutheran Church, the pastor is bound by the Seal of the Confessional (similar to the Roman Catholic tradition). Luther's Small Catechism says "the pastor is pledged not to tell anyone else of sins told him in private confession, for those sins have been removed".

At the present time, it is, for example, expected before partaking of the Eucharist for the first time. Many Lutherans receive the sacrament of penance before partaking of the Eucharist.

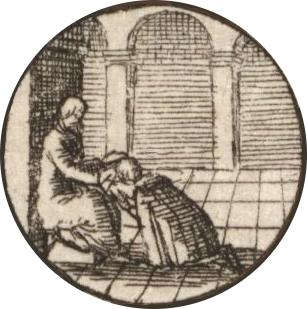
"Private Absolution ought to be retained in the churches, although in confession an enumeration of all sins is not necessary."—Augsburg Confession, Article 9

== Anglican Communion ==
In the Church of England and in the Anglican Communion in general, formal, sacramental absolution is given to penitents in the sacrament of penance now formally called the Reconciliation of a Pentitent and colloquially called "confession." There is also a general absolution given after general confessions in the offices of Morning and Evening Prayer and after the general confession in the Eucharist.

Often, physical actions accompany an absolution. A priest or bishop makes the sign of the cross over the congregation. Those receiving the absolution may make the sign of the cross as well.

At minimum, Anglican prayer books contain a formula of absolution in the daily offices, at the Eucharist, and in the visitation of the sick. The first two are general, akin to the liturgical absolution in use in the Roman Church; the third is individual by the very nature of the case. The offices of the earliest Books of Common Prayer contained an absolution that read both as assurance of pardon, placing the agency with God ("He [God] pardoneth and absolveth all them that truly repent"), and as priestly mediation (God "hath given power and commandment to his ministers to declare and pronounce to his people...the absolution and remission of their sins"). The following is the form of absolution for the sick in the Book of Common Prayer: "OUR Lord Jesus Christ, who hath left power to his Church to absolve all sinners who truly repent and believe in him, of his great mercy forgive thee thine offences: And by his authority committed to me, I absolve thee from all thy sins, In the Name of the Father, and of the Son, and of the Holy Ghost. Amen."

Canada's Book of Alternative Services nuances the words of absolution slightly: "Our Lord Jesus Christ, who has left power to his Church to forgive sins, absolve you through my ministry by the power of his Holy Spirit and restore you to the perfect peace of the Church".

Absolution during Morning Prayer:

ALMIGHTY God, the Father of our Lord Jesus Christ, who desireth not the death of a sinner, but rather that he may turn from his wickedness, and live; and hath given power, and commandment, to his Ministers, to declare and pronounce to his people, being penitent, the Absolution and Remission of their sins : He pardoneth and absolveth all them that truly repent, and unfeignedly believe his holy Gospel. Wherefore let us beseech him to grant us true repentance, and his Holy Spirit, that those things may please him, which we do at this present; and that the rest of our life hereafter may be pure, and holy; so that at the last we may come to his eternal joy; through Jesus Christ our Lord.
People: Amen

— The Absolution, or Remission of sins, to be pronounced by the Priest alone, standing; the people still kneeling.

Absolution during Holy Communion:

ALMIGHTY God, our heavenly Father, who of his great mercy hath promised forgiveness of sins to all them that with hearty repentance and true faith turn unto him; Have mercy upon you; pardon and deliver you from all your sins; confirm and strengthen you in all goodness; and bring you to everlasting life; through Jesus Christ our Lord.
People: Amen.

— Then shall the Priest (or the Bishop, being present,) standing up, and turning himself to the people, pronounce this Absolution.

Absolution during Visitation of the Sick:

OUR Lord Jesus Christ, who hath left power to his Church to absolve all sinners who truly repent and believe in him, of his great mercy forgive thee thine offences: And by his authority committed to me, I absolve thee from all thy sins, In the Name of the Father, and of the Son, and of the Holy Ghost.
Sick: Amen.

If no priest be present the person saying the service shall read the Collect for the Twenty-First Sunday after Trinity:

GRANT, we beseech thee, merciful Lord, to thy faithful people pardon and peace, that they may be cleansed from all their sins, and serve thee with a quiet mind; through Jesus Christ our Lord.
People:Amen.

Of Publick Confession and Absolution – William Nicholls:

According to this thy Confession, which thou hast here made openly, before the face of God and this his Holy Church, I will in the name of God, and by vertue of my most holy Office, according to the command of Jesus Christ, and his most express and efficacious Words, declare the thee N. N. the remission of this Sin N. whereof thou art convicted, and of all thy other Sins, in the name of God the Father, Son and Holy Ghost, Amen.
Go in the peace of God, and sin no more.

— And then laying his Hand upon the Penitent, shall thus absolve him (or her) in this Form.

Of Confession and Absolution – William Nicholls:

For as much as from the bottom of thy heart thou art. Sorry for, and dost detest thy sins, and with a firm faith dost fly to the mercy of God in Christ Jesus, moreover promising that by the Grace of God thou wilt hereafter live a more holy and godly life; in the Name and Authority of God, by vertue of my Office, and from the power which is given me by God from above to remit sins upon earth, I do declare to thee the forgiveness of all thy sins, in the Name of God the Father, Son and Holy Ghost.
May God who has begun a good work in thee perfect it even to the day of our Lord Jesus Christ, and keep thee in a true and lively Faith to the end of thy life, through Jesus Christ. Amen.

— Minister shall lay his hand upon him, and in the Name of the Holy Trinity, he is to declare to him the pardon of all his sins.

== Methodist churches ==
In the Methodist Church, penance is defined by the Articles of Religion as one of those "Commonly called Sacraments but not to be counted for Sacraments of the Gospel", also known as the "five lesser sacraments". John Wesley, the founder of the Methodist Church, held "the validity of Anglican practice in his day as reflected in the 1662 Book of Common Prayer", stating that "We grant confession to men to be in many cases of use: public, in case of public scandal; private, to a spiritual guide for disburdening of the conscience, and as a help to repentance." The Book of Worship of The United Methodist Church contains the rite for private confession and absolution in A Service of Healing II, in which the minister pronounces the words "In the name of Jesus Christ, you are forgiven!"; (Note: A Service of Healing II, after the "Confession and Pardon", states "A Confession and Pardon from 474–94 or A Service of Word and Table V or UMH 890–93, or an appropriate psalm may be used." The words noted here are thus taken from page 52 of the Book of Worship, which details the Service of Word and Table V, specifically the conclusion of the part of the rite titled "Confession and Pardon".) some Methodist churches have regularly scheduled auricular confession and absolution, while others make it available upon request. Confession in the Methodist churches is practiced through penitent bands that meet on Saturdays; from the inception of Methodism, these are designed to provide spiritual direction to people who are backsliding. Since Methodism holds the office of the keys to "belong to all baptized persons", private confession does not necessarily need to be made to a pastor, and therefore lay confession is permitted, although this is not the norm.

Near the time of death, many Methodists confess their sins and receive absolution from an ordained minister, in addition to being anointed. In Methodism, the minister is bound by the Seal of the Confessional, with The Book of Discipline stating "All clergy of The United Methodist Church are charged to maintain all confidences inviolate, including confessional confidences"; any confessor who divulges information revealed in confession is subject to being defrocked in accordance with canon law. As with Lutheranism, in the Methodist tradition, corporate confession is the most common practice, with the Methodist liturgy including "prayers of confession, assurance and pardon". The traditional confession of The Sunday Service, the first liturgical text used by Methodists, comes from the service of Morning Prayer in The Book of Common Prayer. The confession of one's sin is particularly important before receiving Holy Communion; the official United Methodist publication about the Eucharist titled This Holy Mystery states that:

We respond to the invitation to the Table by immediately confessing our personal and corporate sin, trusting that, “If we confess our sins, He who is faithful and just will forgive us our sins and cleanse us from all unrighteousness” (1 John 1:9). Our expression of repentance is answered by the absolution in which forgiveness is proclaimed: “In the name of Jesus Christ, you are forgiven!”

Many Methodists, like other Protestants, regularly practice confession of their sin to God Himself, holding that "When we do confess, our fellowship with the Father is restored. He extends His parental forgiveness. He cleanses us of all unrighteousness, thus removing the consequences of the previously unconfessed sin. We are back on track to realise the best plan that He has for our lives."

== Reformed churches ==
In the Reformed tradition (which includes the Continental Reformed, Presbyterian and Congregationalist denominations), corporate confession is the normative way that confession and absolution is practiced. The Order of Worship in the Bible Presbyterian Church, for example, enjoins the following:

Each Sunday we have a corporate confession of sins with an announcement of assurance of pardon from sin—this is great news for all believers. We strive to use the form of confession sincerely, to acknowledging our brokenness—in thought, word, and deed—and to receive God's forgiveness through Jesus Christ in thankfulness.

With regard to private confession and absolution, the founders of the Reformed tradition (Continental Reformed, Presbyterian, Congregationalist) attacked the penitential practice of the Catholic Church and differed in their teaching on the subject. The opinions expressed by some Calvinist reformers in their later theological works do not differ as markedly from the old position. Huldrych Zwingli held that God alone pardoned sin, and he saw nothing but idolatry in the practice of hoping for pardon from a mere creature. If confession to a pastor "had aught of good", (had any good) it was merely as direction. He saw no value in the private confession of sins to a pastor, and no measure of sacramentality in the practice of confession. John Calvin denied all idea of sacramentality when there was question of Penance. The Second Helvetic Confession (1566) denies the necessity of confession to a priest, but holds that the power granted by Christ to absolve is simply the power to preach to the people the Gospel of Jesus, and as a consequence the remission of sins: "Rite itaque et efficaciter ministri absolvunt dum evangelium Christi et in hoc remissionem peccatorum prædicant." (Therefore, and effectively, the ministers, while the Gospel of Christ and in this remission of sins). (Second Helvetic Confession 14.4–6)

== Liberal Catholic movement ==
The Liberal Catholic movement believes that absolution is important. The Liberal Catholic Church International states: We teach that Christ has given to the Priests of His Church the power to absolve the repentant faithful from their sins. We teach that the Sacrament of Absolution is a loosening from the bondage of sin, a restoration of the inner harmony that was disturbed by the wrongdoing, so that the person can make a fresh start toward righteousness. We do not teach that Absolution is a way of escaping the consequences of one's misdeeds. "Harbor no illusions; God is not deceived: for whatsoever a man soweth, that shall he also reap." (Galatians 6:7)

== Irvingian churches ==
In the Irvingian churches, such as the New Apostolic Church, persons may confess their sins to an Apostle. The Apostle is then able to "take the confession and proclaim absolution". A seal of confession ensures that confidentiality between the Apostle and Penitent is maintained. In cases of grave urgency, any priestly minister can hear confessions and pronounce absolutions. In the Irvingian Christian denominations, auricular confession is not necessary for forgiveness, but it provides peace if a believer feels burdened.

== See also ==
- Absolution of the dead
- Complicit absolution
- Sin Eater
- Priest–penitent privilege
