= Absolution of the dead =

Prayer or declaration regarding a dead person's sins

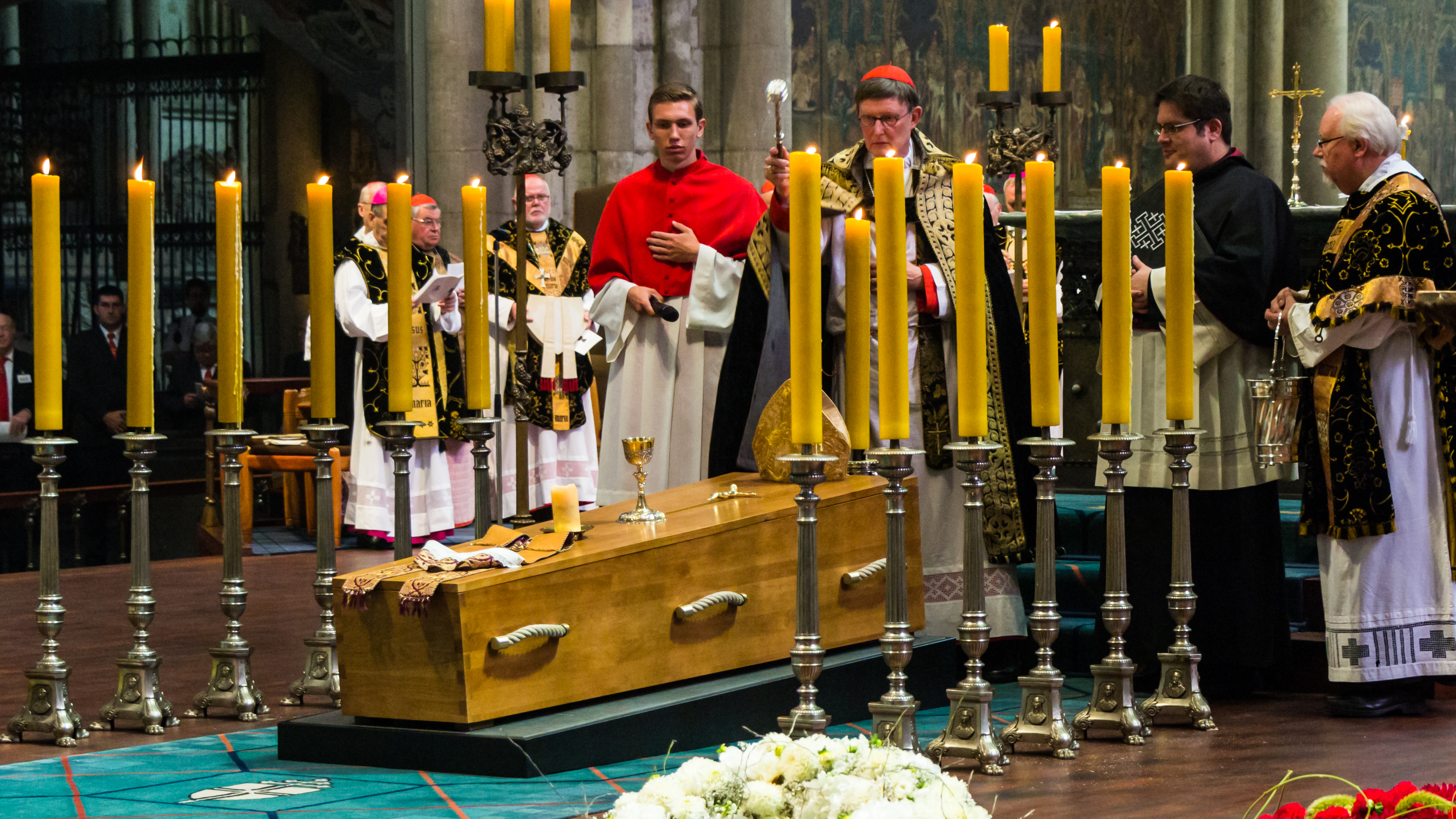
Cardinal Woelki blesses the coffin of Joachim Cardinal em. Meisner, Cologne cathedral, 2017

Absolution of the dead is a prayer for or a declaration of absolution of a dead person's sins that takes place at the person's religious funeral.

Such prayers are found in the funeral rites of the Catholic Church, Anglicanism, and the Eastern Orthodox Church.

Liturgists analysing the Roman Rite funeral texts have applied the term "absolution" (not "absolution of the dead") to the series of chants and prayers that follow Requiem Mass and precede the solemn removal of the body from the church for burial. They have not applied the same term (which does not appear in the official Latin-language liturgical books of the Catholic Church) to the chants and prayers preceding the Mass, in spite of the presence among them of the prayer: "Absolve, we beseech thee, O Lord, the soul of thy servant from every bond of sin, that he may live again among thy saints and elect in the glory of the resurrection."

In the early 20th century, the French term absoute was sometimes used instead of "absolution".

== Catholic Church ==
=== Tridentine ritual ===
In the wake of the Council of Trent, the Roman Breviary (1568) and the Roman Missal (1570) were imposed almost everywhere in the Latin Church. However, when the Roman Ritual was issued in 1614, its use was not made obligatory. Nevertheless, local ritual books were generally influenced by it, while often keeping practices and texts traditional in their areas.

The Roman Ritual instructs the priest, after the Requiem Mass, to stand at the coffin and recite the prayer Non intres in iudicium cum servo tuo: "Enter not into judgement with Thy servant, O Lord: for in Thy sight shall no man be justified, save Thou grant him remission of all his sins. Therefore, let not, we beseech Thee, the sentence Thou pronouncest in judgement fall heavily upon one whom the faithful prayer of Thy Christian people commends to Thee, but rather, by the help of Thy grace, may he [she] be found worthy to escape the judgement of condemnation, who in this lifetime was sealed with the seal of the holy Trinity."

This prayer is followed by the singing or recitation of the responsory Libera me Domine: "Deliver me, O Lord, from eternal death in that awful day. When the heavens and the earth shall be moved. When Thou shalt come to judge the world by fire. Dread and trembling have laid hold on me, and I fear exceedingly because of the judgement and the wrath to come. When the heavens and the earth shall be moved. O that day, that day of wrath, of sore distress and of all wretchedness, that great and exceeding bitter day. When Thou shalt come to judge the world by fire. Eternal rest grant unto them, O Lord, and let perpetual light shine upon them. Deliver me, O Lord, from eternal death in that awful day. When the heavens and the earth shall be moved. When Thou shalt come to judge the world by fire." Meanwhile, the priest prepares the thurible.

The choir next sings Kyrie eleison, Christe eleison, Kyrie eleison, after which the priest says aloud Pater noster and continues silently the rest of the Lord's Prayer, while walking around the coffin, sprinkling it with holy water and incensing it. A few versicles and responses follow, after which the priest recites what Herbert Thurston calls "the prayer of absolution", Deus cui proprium est: "O God, whose property is ever to have mercy and to spare, we humbly beseech Thee on behalf of thy servant [handmaid] N..., which Thou hast called out of the world, that Thou wouldst not deliver him [her] into the hands of the enemy, nor forget him [her] forever, but command that he [she] be taken up by Thy holy angels and borne to our home in paradise; that having put his [her] hope and trust in Thee, he [she] will not suffer the pains of hell, but may come to the possession of eternal joys."

After this prayer the body is removed from the church to the singing or recitation of In paradisum.

If the service is carried out in the absence of the body, a different "prayer of absolution" is said, beginning with the word "Absolve": "Absolve, we beseech Thee, O Lord, the soul of Thy servant [handmaid] N..., that he [she] who is dead to the world, may live unto Thee, and wipe away by Thy most merciful forgiveness what sins he [she] may have committed in life through human frailty."

=== Pauline ritual ===
This part of the funeral rite has been revised and shortened after the liturgical reforms of 1969. Commentators and liturgists no longer call it the absolution; its official title is "Final Commendation and Farewell".

The Requiem Mass has no formula of dismissal. Immediately after the prayer after communion the Final Commendation and Farewell begins with an invitation to prayer. The English edition gives only two formulas of invitation. Editions in other languages can provide a wider range: the Italian version gives four based on the Latin text, followed by an additional set of eight.

This is followed by the responsorial chant "Saints of God, come to his/her aid", during which the priest goes around the coffin, first sprinkling it with holy water in memory of the sacrament of baptism that began divine life for the dead person, and then incensing it as a sign of respect for the body of the deceased.

The priest then recites a prayer for the dead person, one version of which is a variant of the second of the two "prayers of absolution" mentioned above. In the official English translation it asks: "Forgive whatever sins he/she committed through human weakness and in your goodness grant him/her eternal rest."

The priest concludes the service with the formula, "In peace let us take our brother/sister to his/her place of rest", and the body is taken out of the church to the accompaniment of the singing or recitation of a vernacular version of In paradisum.

== Eastern Orthodox Church ==
I black pall may stand in the place of the body for the absolution. If a catafalque is not available, a black n the Eastern Orthodox Church the Prayer of Absolution is written out on a piece of paper. After the singing of Memory eternal at the end of an Orthodox funeral, the prayer is read by the bishop or priest presiding over the funeral, or by the deceased's spiritual father. He stands near the coffin and, facing the deceased, reads the prayer:

Our Lord Jesus Christ, by His divine grace, as also by the gift of the power vouchsafed unto His holy Disciples and Apostles, that they should bind and loose the sins of men: (For He said unto them: Receive ye the Holy Spirit: Whosesoever sins ye remit, they are remitted; and whosesoever sins ye retain they are retained. And whatsoever ye shall bind or loose upon earth shall be bound or loosed also in heaven.) By that same power, also, transmitted unto us from them, this my spiritual child, N., is absolved, through me, unworthy though I be, from all things wherein, as mortal, he (she) hath sinned against God, whether in word, or deed, or thought, and with all his (her) senses, whether voluntarily or involuntarily, whether wittingly or through ignorance. If he (she) be under the ban or excommunication of a bishop, or of a Priest; or hath incurred the curse of his (her) father or mother; or hath fallen under his (her) own curse; or hath sinned by any oath; or hath been bound, as man, by any sins whatsoever, but hath repented him (her) thereof, with contrition of heart: he (she) is now absolved from all those faults and bonds. May all those things which have proceeded from the weakness of his (her) mortal nature be consigned to oblivion and be remitted unto him (her); Through His loving-kindness; through the prayers of our most holy, and blessed, and glorious Lady, the Mother of our Lord and ever-virgin Mary; of the holy, glorious and all-laudable Apostles and of all the Saints. Amen.

The paper is then rolled up and placed in the hand of the departed.

The Prayer of Absolution is understood as the means by which "the Church remits all the departed's transgressions, absolves him from all obligations, all pledges or oaths, and sends him off in peace into life everlasting." However, as is clear from the text of the prayer, it is intended only to forgive those sins which the departed had repented of during his or her lifetime.

The reading of the Prayer of Absolution is a more recent practice and replaces the older (and shorter) Parting Prayer:

May the Lord Jesus Christ our God, Who gave His divine commands to His holy Disciples and Apostles, that they should bind and loose the sins of the fallen (we, in turn, having received from them the right to do the same) pardon thee, O spiritual child, all thy deeds done amiss in this life, both voluntary and involuntary: Now, and ever, and unto ages of ages. Amen.

=== Funerals of children ===
The Prayer of Absolution is not read in the Funeral for a Child (a special funeral used for children under the age of seven), since such young children are not generally held to be morally responsible for their sins, but is replaced by the following prayer:

O Lord, Who guardest little children in this present life, and hast prepared for them in the life which is to come a spacious place, even Abraham's bosom, and angelic abodes brightly radiant which befit their purity, wherein the souls of the righteous dwell: Do Thou, the same Lord Christ, receive the soul of Thy servant, the child, N., with peace. For thou hast said: Suffer the little children to come unto me, for of such is the kingdom of heaven. For unto Thee are due all glory, honour and worship, with the Father and the Holy Spirit, now, and ever, and unto ages of ages. Amen.

== See also ==
- Absolution
- Catholic funeral
