= Catholic funeral =

Service of the Church that accompanies a deceased person and his entourage

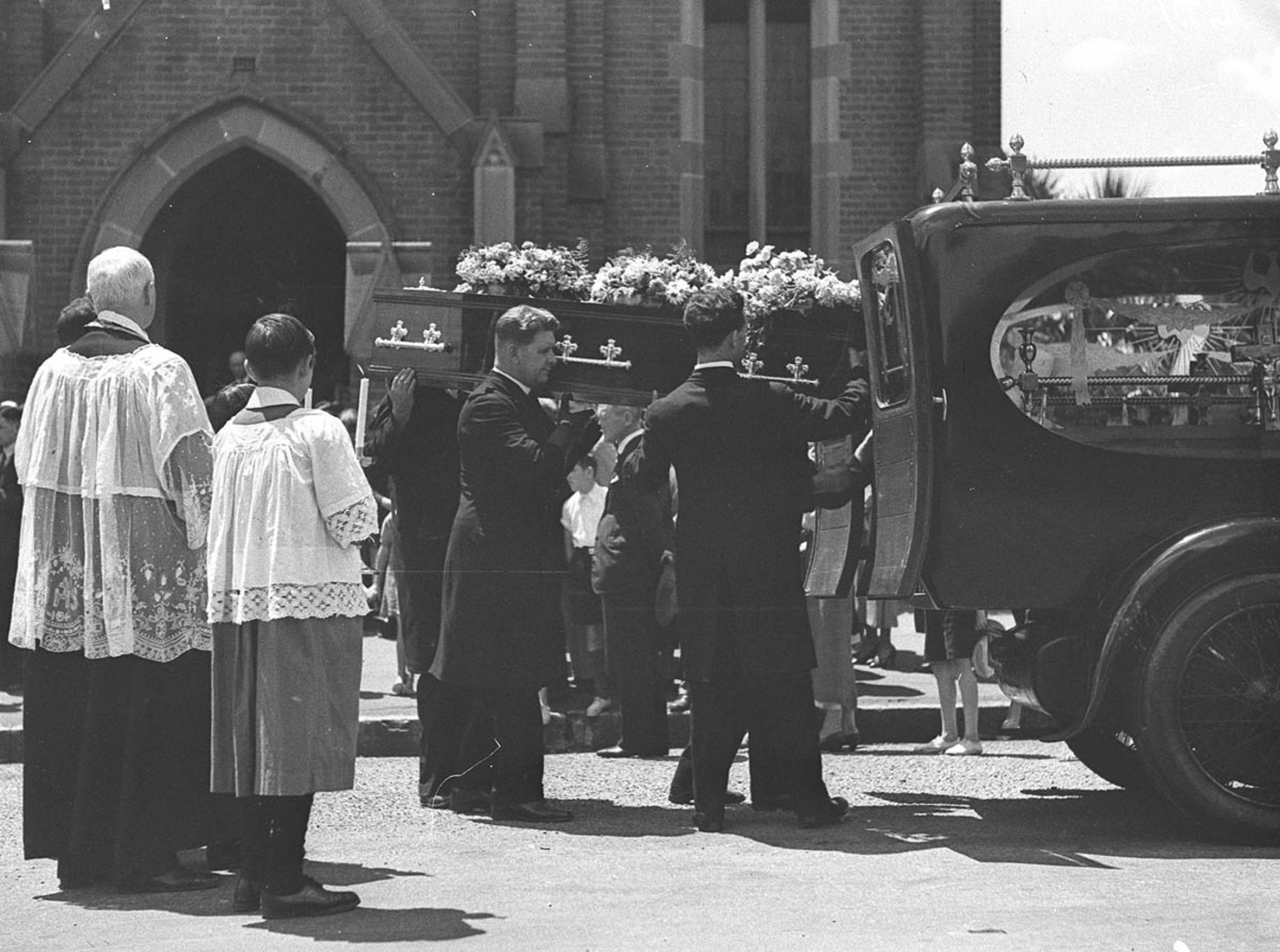
Catholic funeral service at St Mary Immaculate Church, Charing Cross

A Catholic funeral is carried out in accordance with the prescribed rites of the Catholic Church. Such funerals are referred to in Catholic canon law as "ecclesiastical funerals" and are dealt with in canons 1176–1185 of the 1983 Code of Canon Law, and in canons 874–879 of the Code of Canons of the Eastern Churches. In Catholic funerals, the Church "seeks spiritual support for the deceased, honors their bodies, and at the same time brings the solace of hope to the living." The Second Vatican Council in its Constitution on the Liturgy decreed: "The rite for the burial of the dead should express more clearly the paschal character of Christian death, and should correspond more closely to the circumstances and traditions found in various regions."

== Canon law ==
In general, Catholics are to be given a Catholic funeral upon their death. Catechumens are to be considered as Catholics with regard to funeral matters, and the local ordinary may permit unbaptized children whose parents intended to have them baptized to be given a Catholic funeral. The local ordinary may also permit baptized persons who were not Catholic to be given a Catholic funeral, provided their own minister is not available, unless they were clearly opposed to it.

However, Catholic burial rites are to be refused even to baptized Catholics who fall within any of the following classifications, unless they gave some sign of repentance before death:

1. Persons publicly known to be guilty of apostasy, heresy or schism;
2. Those who asked to be cremated for anti-Christian motives;
3. Manifest sinners, if the granting of Church funeral rites to them would cause scandal to Catholics.

The Latin Church also has some guidelines regarding the church in which the funeral rites are to be celebrated and limits on the fees payable to a priest for conducting the funeral.

== Funeral rites ==
What follows concerns practice in the Roman Rite of the Latin Church. Practice within Eastern Catholic Churches is basically similar, but takes account of different traditions and follows different liturgical norms. There are some variations also with regard to other Latin liturgical rites.

In the wake of the Council of Trent, the Roman Breviary (1568) and the Roman Missal (1570) were imposed almost everywhere in the Latin Church. However, when the Roman Ritual was issued in 1614, its use was not made obligatory. Nevertheless, local ritual books were generally influenced by it, while often keeping practices and texts traditional in their areas.

The Second Vatican Council was followed by a revision of the liturgy of the Roman Rite, including that for funerals in the De exsequiis section of the previous Rituale Romanum with the Order of Christian Funerals. The Council also mandated revisions to the rite for the burial of infants, with a specific liturgical rite to be used on these occasions.

The Roman Missal as revised by Pope Paul VI and Pope John Paul II has since then been "the normal Form – the Forma ordinaria – of the Eucharistic Liturgy", while the previous edition of the Roman Missal, that of 1962, is "able to be used as a Forma extraordinaria of the liturgical celebration". In 2007, Pope Benedict XVI indicated that, "for those faithful or priests who request it, the pastor should allow celebrations in this extraordinary form also in special circumstances such as [...] funerals".

While funerals may be held on any day, the special funeral Mass for such occasions are not to be celebrated on "Solemnities that are Holydays of Obligation, Thursday of Holy Week, the Paschal Triduum, and the Sundays of Advent, Lent, and Easter". As a rare exception, Pope Benedict XVI allowed Cardinal Secretary of State Tarcisio Bertone to celebrate a single funeral Mass for a group of victims of the 2009 L'Aquila earthquake on Good Friday, when no Mass at all is normally offered.

=== Conveyance to the church ===
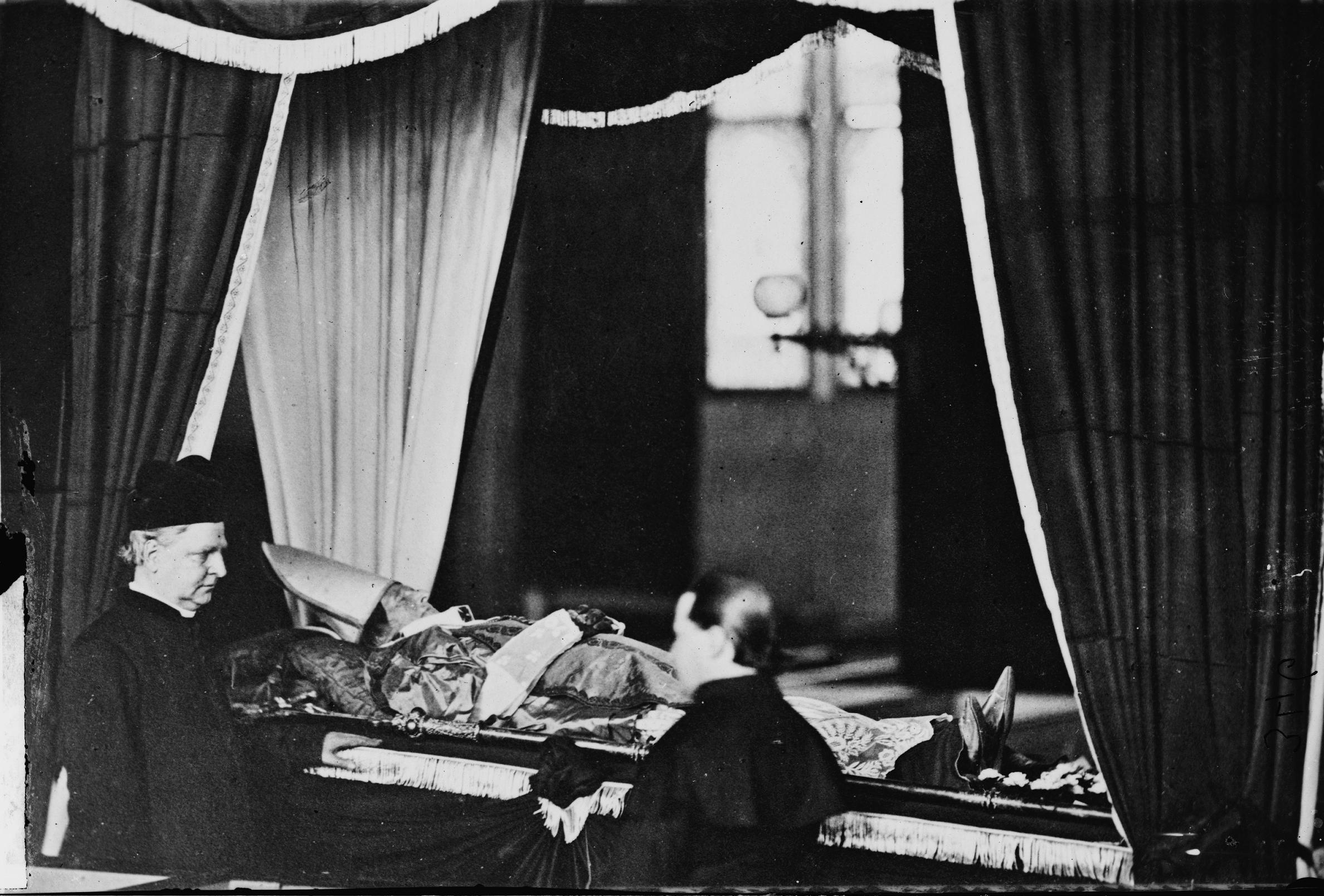
Archbishop John Hughes prepared for burial, St. Patrick's Old Cathedral, New York, 1864.

The Rite of Funerals for the United States acknowledges that funeral processions from home to church and church to cemetery "do not ordinarily take place in this country". Hymns from these ceremonies may, therefore, be incorporated in the liturgy of the Mass.

Where such processions do take place, one tradition is reflected in the following. The parish priest and other clergy go to the house of the deceased with cross and holy water. Before the coffin is removed from the house it is sprinkled with the holy water. The priest, with his assistants, says the psalm De profundis with the antiphon Si iniquitates. Then the procession sets out for the church. The cross-bearer goes first, followed by members of the clergy carrying lighted candles. The priest walks immediately before the coffin, and the friends of the deceased and others walk behind it.

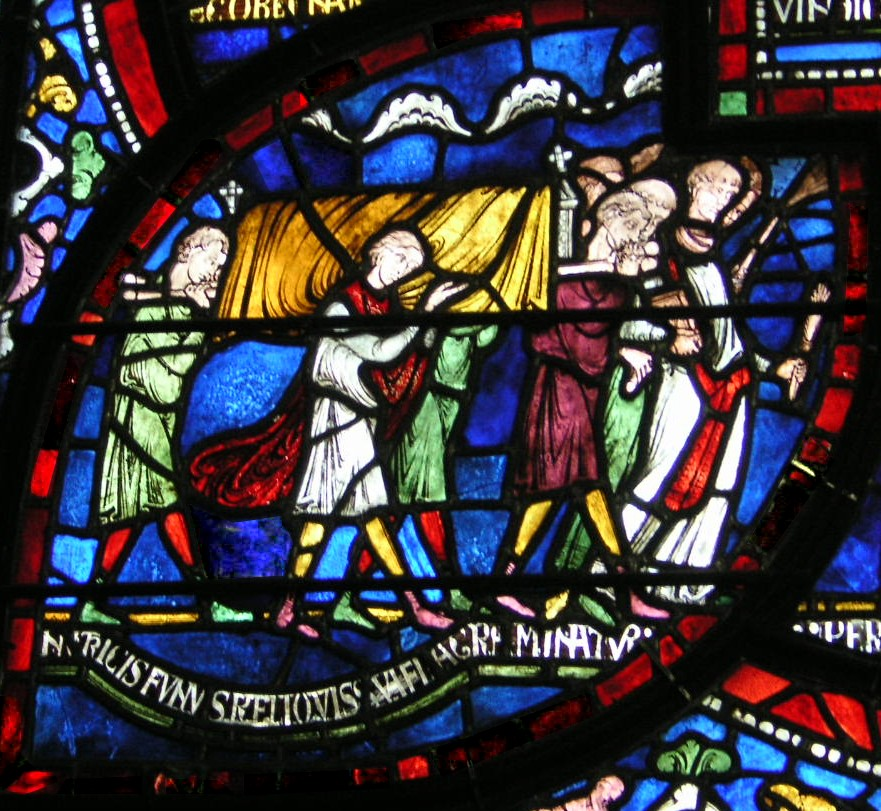
Funeral procession from the "Healing Window" at Canterbury Cathedral.

As they leave the house, the priest intones the antiphon Exsultabunt Domino, and then the psalm Miserere is recited or chanted in alternate verses by the cantors and clergy. On reaching the church the antiphon Exsultabunt is repeated. As the body is placed "in the middle of the church", the responsorial Subvenite is recited.

Historical precedents provide that, if the corpse is a layman, the feet are to be turned towards the altar. If the corpse is a priest, then the position is reversed, the head being towards the altar. The earliest reference to this is in Johann Burchard's "Diary". Burchard was the master of ceremonies to Pope Innocent VIII and Pope Alexander VI. The idea seems to be that the bishop (or priest) in death should occupy the same position in the church as during life, facing his people who he taught and blessed in Christ's name.

According to another tradition not now considered obligatory in the Roman Rite, the feet of all Christians both before the altar and in the grave should be pointed to the East. This custom is alluded to by Bishop Hildebert at the beginning of the 12th century, and its symbolism is discussed by Guillaume Durand. "A man ought so to be buried", he says, "that while his head lies to the West his feet are turned to the East..."

=== In the church ===
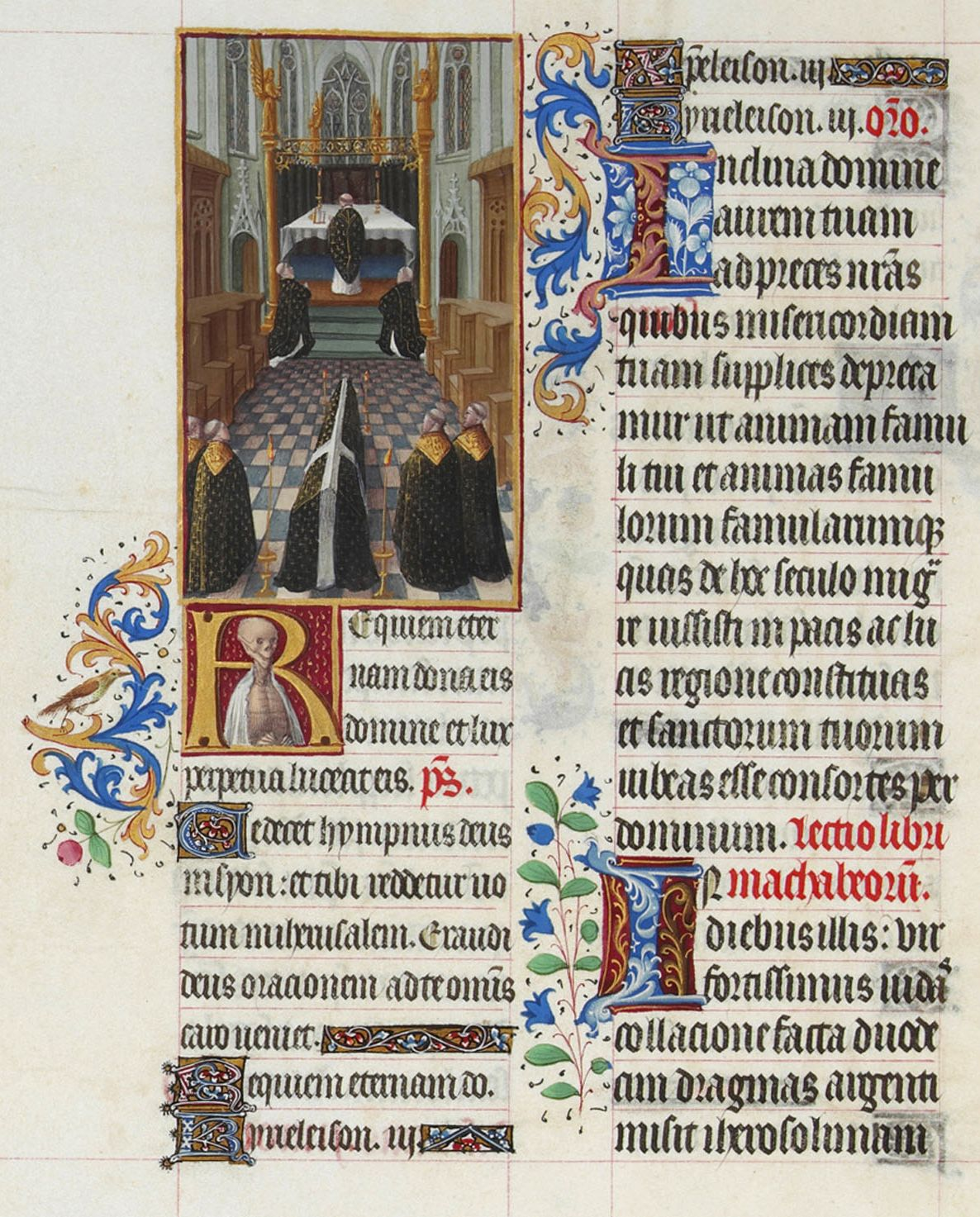
A Funeral Service (Les Très Riches Heures du duc de Berry, Folio 199v. Musée Condé, Chantilly.

Next comes a cycle of prayers, the funeral Mass, and absolution of the dead. Candles are lit around the coffin, and they are allowed to burn throughout this stage.

The prayers offered are the Office of the Dead. In the earlier forms, certain omissions are made throughout the prayers. For example, each psalm ends with Requiem aeternam instead of the Gloria Patri.

==== Funeral Mass ====
A Funeral Mass is a form of Mass for the Dead or Requiem Mass, so called because of the first word of what in earlier forms of the Roman Rite was the only Introit (entrance antiphon) allowed: Réquiem ætérnam dona eis, Dómine; et lux perpétua lúceat eis. (Eternal rest give to them, O Lord; and let perpetual light shine upon them). As revised in 1970, the Roman Missal also provides alternative Introits.

The bier holding the body is positioned centrally close to the sanctuary of the church. A deceased lay person's feet are towards the altar, but a priest's are away from the altar, positions reminiscent of their relative positions when alive and celebrating Mass.

A Funeral Mass usually concludes with the rite of commendation of the dead person, formerly referred to as the absolution, in which the coffin containing the body is sprinkled with holy water and incensed. While usually conducted in church, it may be conducted in the cemetery. If the commendation is in church, then a shorter service is used at the cemetery.

In the United States, England, and Wales, the post-Vatican II form allows the use of white vestments, besides violet and (where it is customary) black, which alone are envisaged in the original Latin text of the General Instruction of the Roman Missal.

The sequence Dies Iræ, recited or sung between the Tract and the Gospel, is an obligatory part of the Requiem Mass in the Tridentine forms. As its opening words, Dies irae (Day of wrath), indicate, this poetic composition speaks of the Day of Judgment in fearsome terms; it then appeals to Jesus for mercy.

Some of these differences may have arisen from treating this Mass as supplementary to the Mass of the day. In other cases, the Requiem Mass preserves the tradition of a more primitive age. In the early Christian ages, it seems that the Alleluia, especially in the East, was regarded as especially appropriate to funerals, and it has returned as an option in the renewed ritual following Vatican II, which emphasizes Christian hope of resurrection and the paschal character of the Christian celebration, with the option of placing the paschal candle at the coffin in church.

==== Final Commendation and Farewell ====
The part of the church service that follows the Mass includes the sprinkling of the coffin with holy water and incensing it on both sides.

This part was commonly called the absolution and in the Tridentine version is longer and contains several chants that, in the absence of a choir capable of singing them, are read in Latin by the celebrating priest: the Libera me, Domine before the honoring of the coffin, and the In paradisum while the body is carried from the church.

=== Graveside ===
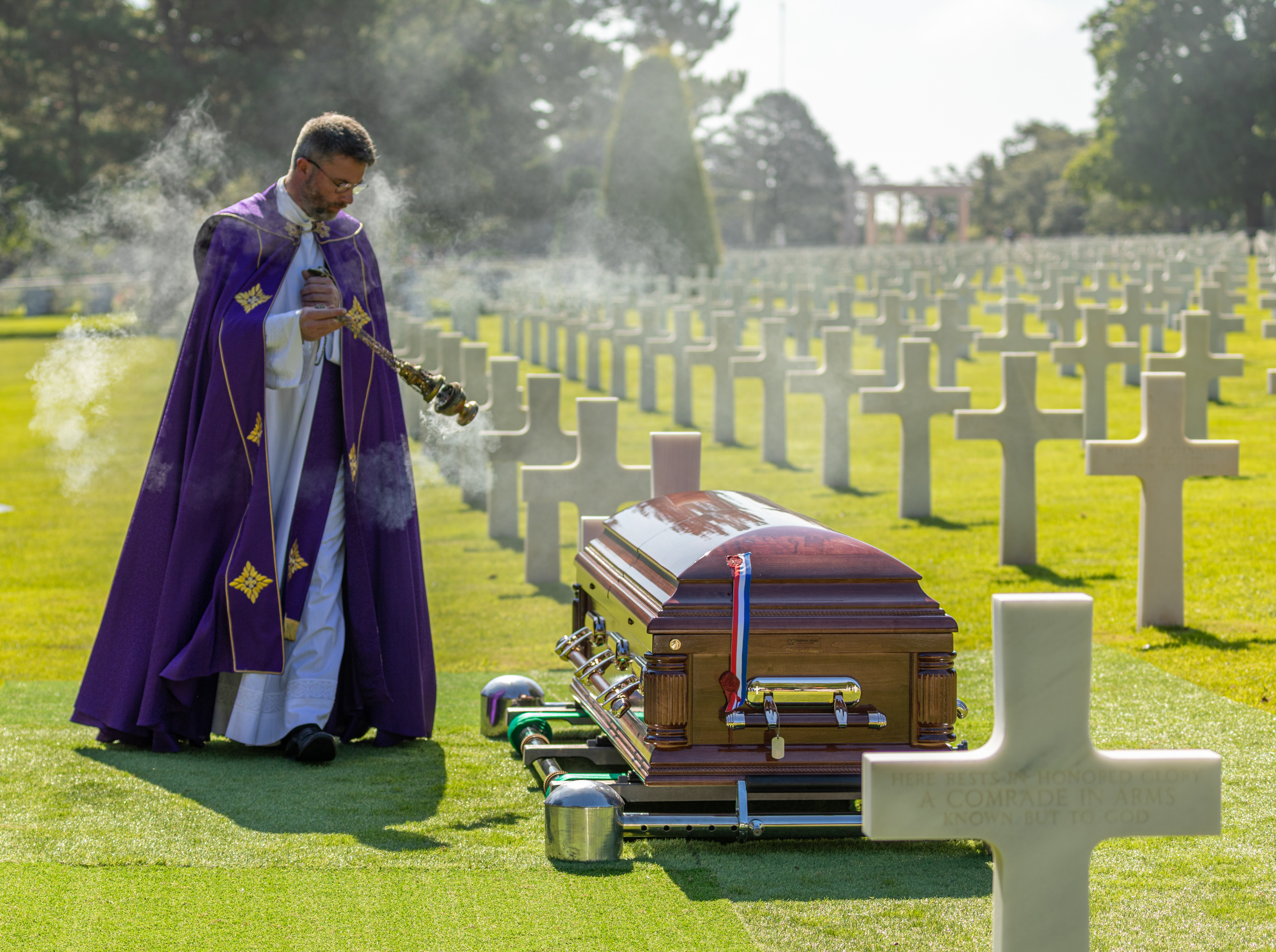
A Catholic priest stands over a coffin with a thurible prior to a burial at Normandy American Cemetery and Memorial in 2022.

Usually the final commendation is conducted in church and then the body is carried to the grave. The tomb or burial plot is then blessed, if it has not been blessed previously. A grave newly dug in an already consecrated cemetery is considered blessed, and requires no further consecration. However, a mausoleum erected above ground, or even a brick chamber beneath the surface, is regarded as needing blessing when used for the first time. This blessing is short and consists only of a single prayer after which the body is again sprinkled with holy water and incensed.

The graveside ceremony usually ends with a prayer to bolster the hope of those who mourn: "Show compassion to your people in their sorrow. ...Lift us from the darkness of this grief to the peace and light of your presence."

=== Funeral donation ===
Many Catholic families make a donation to the priest in honor of the deceased family member. Such donations are primarily in the form of money, but in some cases the family may donate a vestment, Communion ware, i.e. a chalice, a ciborium, and a pyx for the priest to use in his services or for a missionary priest who needs things for his ministry. In the United States, many funeral homes add the stipend for the priest to the funeral bill and then hand this on to the priest.

=== Requiem Masses ===
Since Vatican II, Requiem Masses have mainly been celebrated for a funeral, or as a commemorative Mass for the deceased in cases of cremation or when the body is not present. The custom of celebrating Requiem Masses at later times, such as in remembrance of one's deceased relative(s), is largely replaced by ordinary daily Masses said with a stipend for the intention of the donor.

== See also ==
- Funeral sermon and prayer
- Month's Mind
- Viewing (funeral)
- Wake (ceremony)
- Parish register
