= Giuseppe Molteni =

Italian painter (1800–1867)

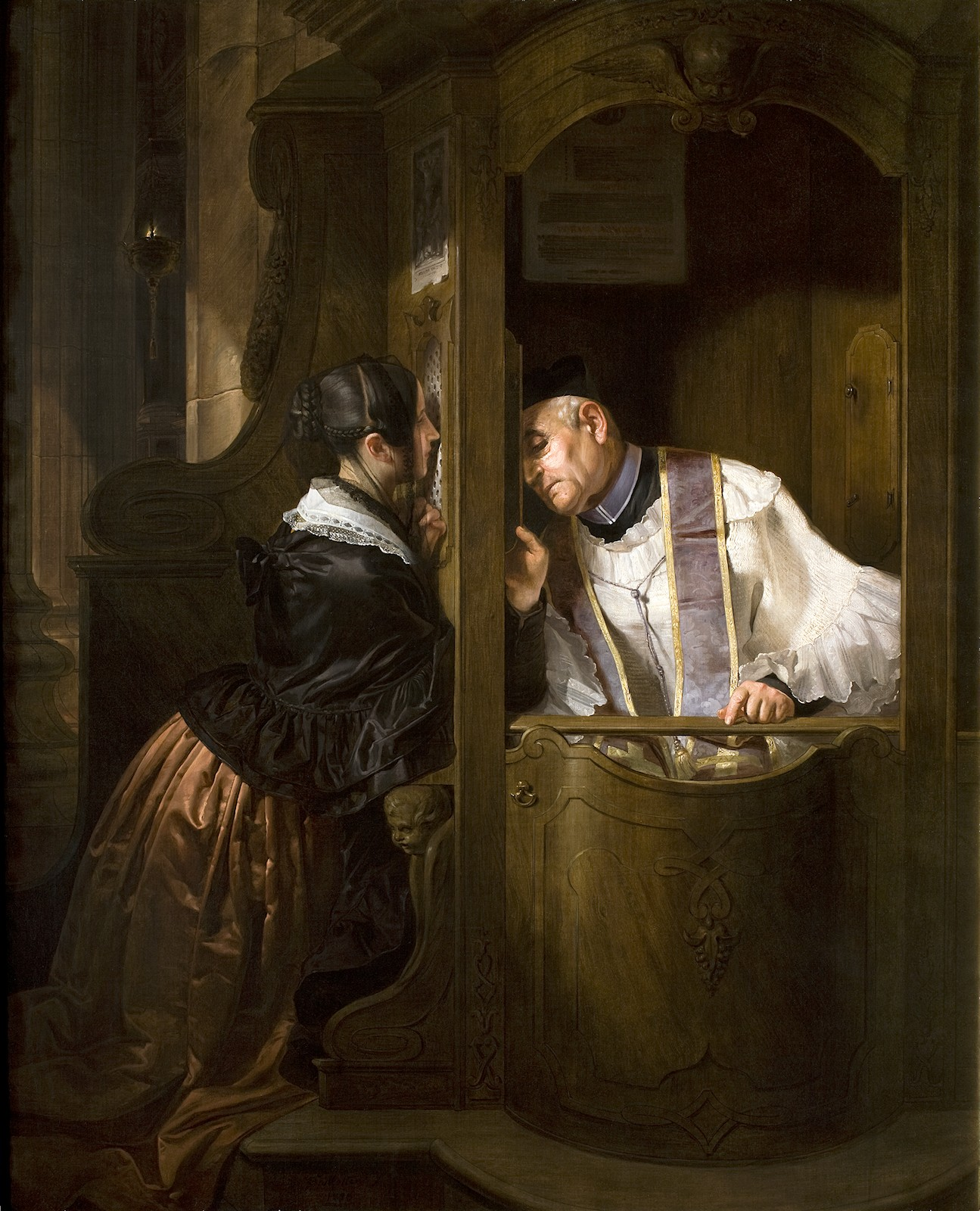
The Confession, 1838 (Fondazione Cariplo)

Giuseppe Molteni (Affori, Milan, 1800 – Milan, 1867) was an Italian painter.

== Biography ==
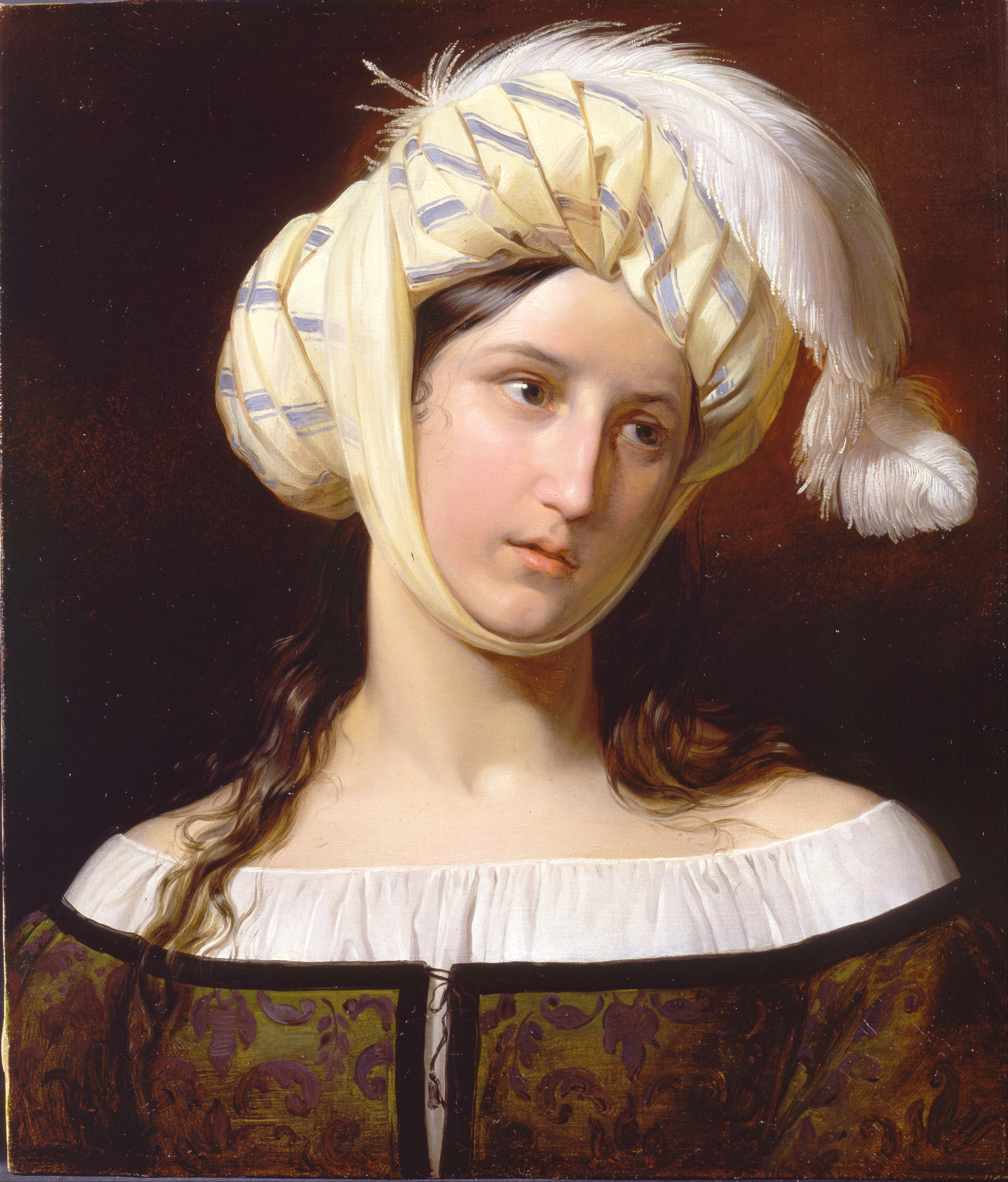
Rebecca

Forced to abandon his studies at the Brera Academy for financial reasons, Molteni took up the restoration of ancient paintings as a pupil of Giuseppe Guizzardi in Bologna. On his return to Milan, he soon became one of the most sought-after restorers of the day, a consultant to the Louvre and the British Museum as well as the leading collectors and connoisseurs in Milan and Europe as a whole. He also devoted his energies to painting.

In 1828, he inaugurated a genre of portraiture characterised by the meticulous depiction of sumptuous costumes and settings, which proved an extraordinary success and brought him into direct competition with Francesco Hayez. The period spent at the court in Vienna in 1837 to paint the portrait of Emperor Ferdinand I led to an appreciation of Biedermeier painting and friendship with the painter Friedrich von Amerling and the style of Johann Friedrich Overbeck. A switch to genre painting came in 1837 with scenes of contemporary everyday life that proved an immediate success with the public and critics. Molteni’s regular participation in the Brera exhibitions slackened in the 1850s and ceased when he was appointed curator of the Academy’s gallery in 1854; he stopped painting altogether.

== Gallery ==
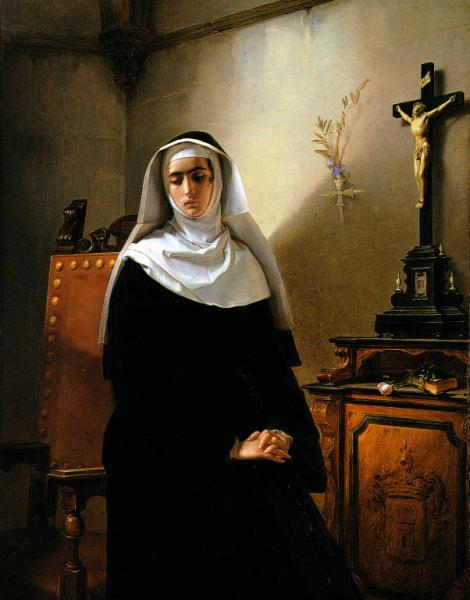
La signora di Monza

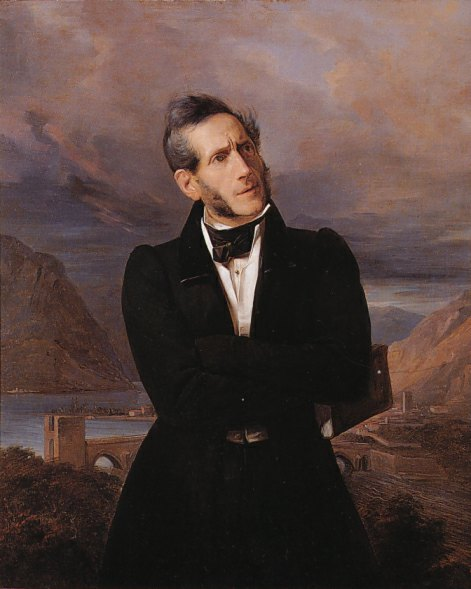
Alessandro Manzoni

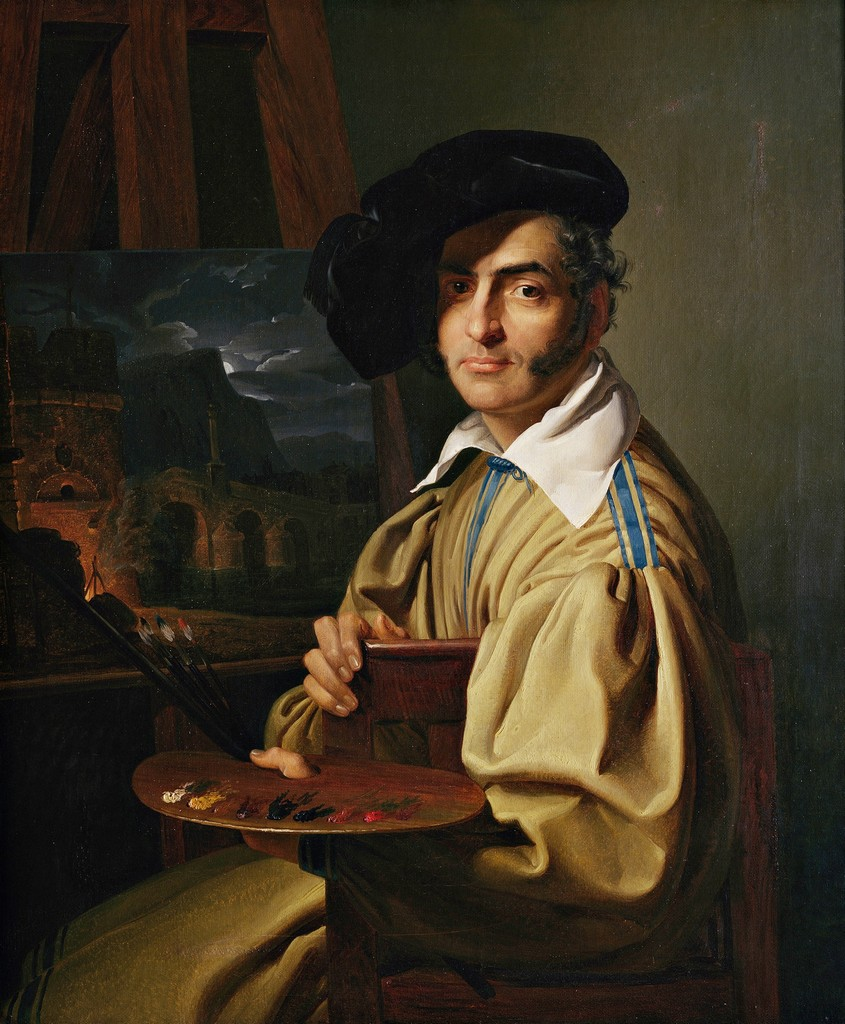
Giovanni Migliara

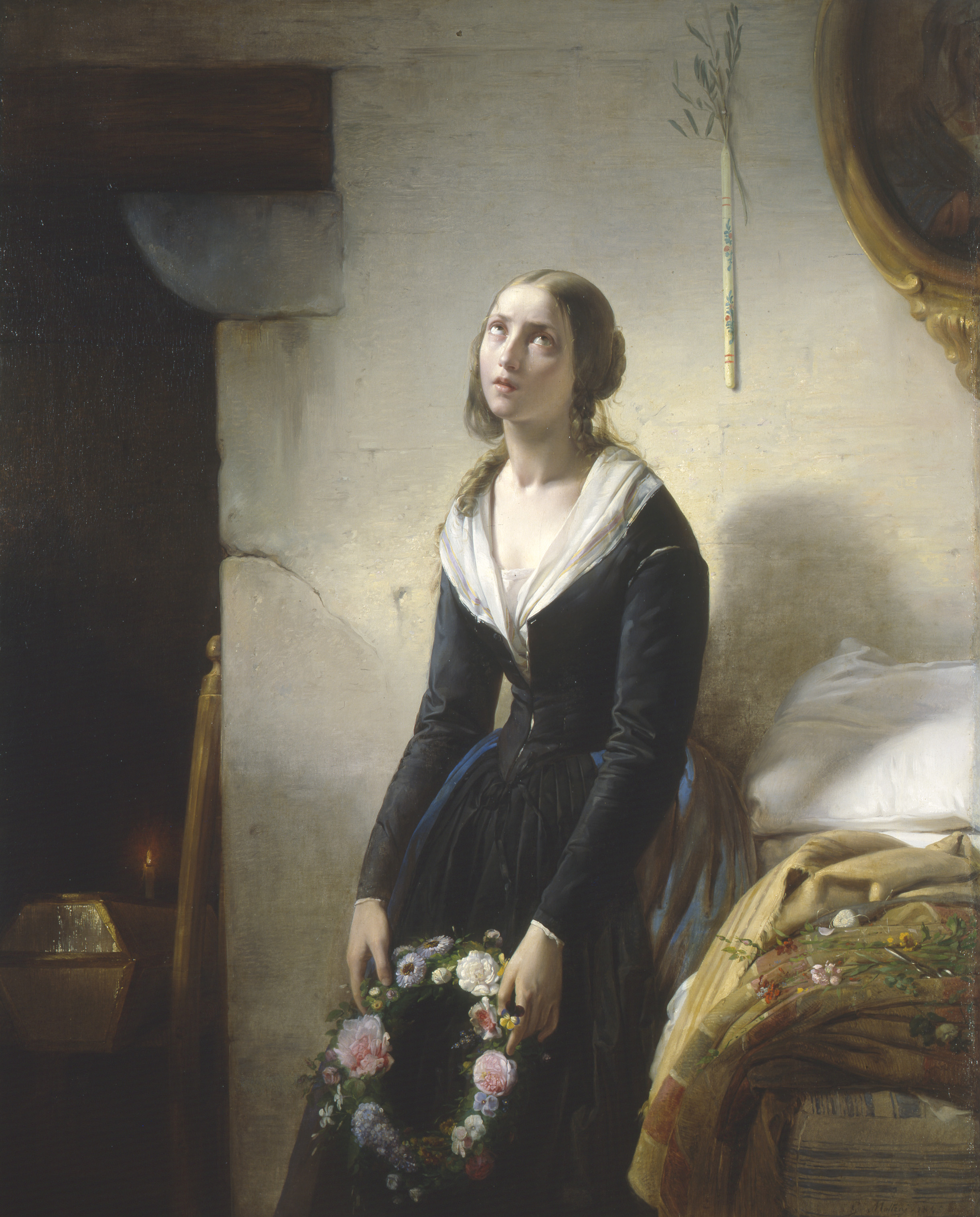
Mother Mourning the Death of her Child

== Bibliography ==
- Elena Lissoni, Giuseppe Molteni, online catalogue Artgate by Fondazione Cariplo, 2010, CC BY-SA (source for the first revision of this article).
