= The Confession (Molteni) =

Painting by Giuseppe Molteni

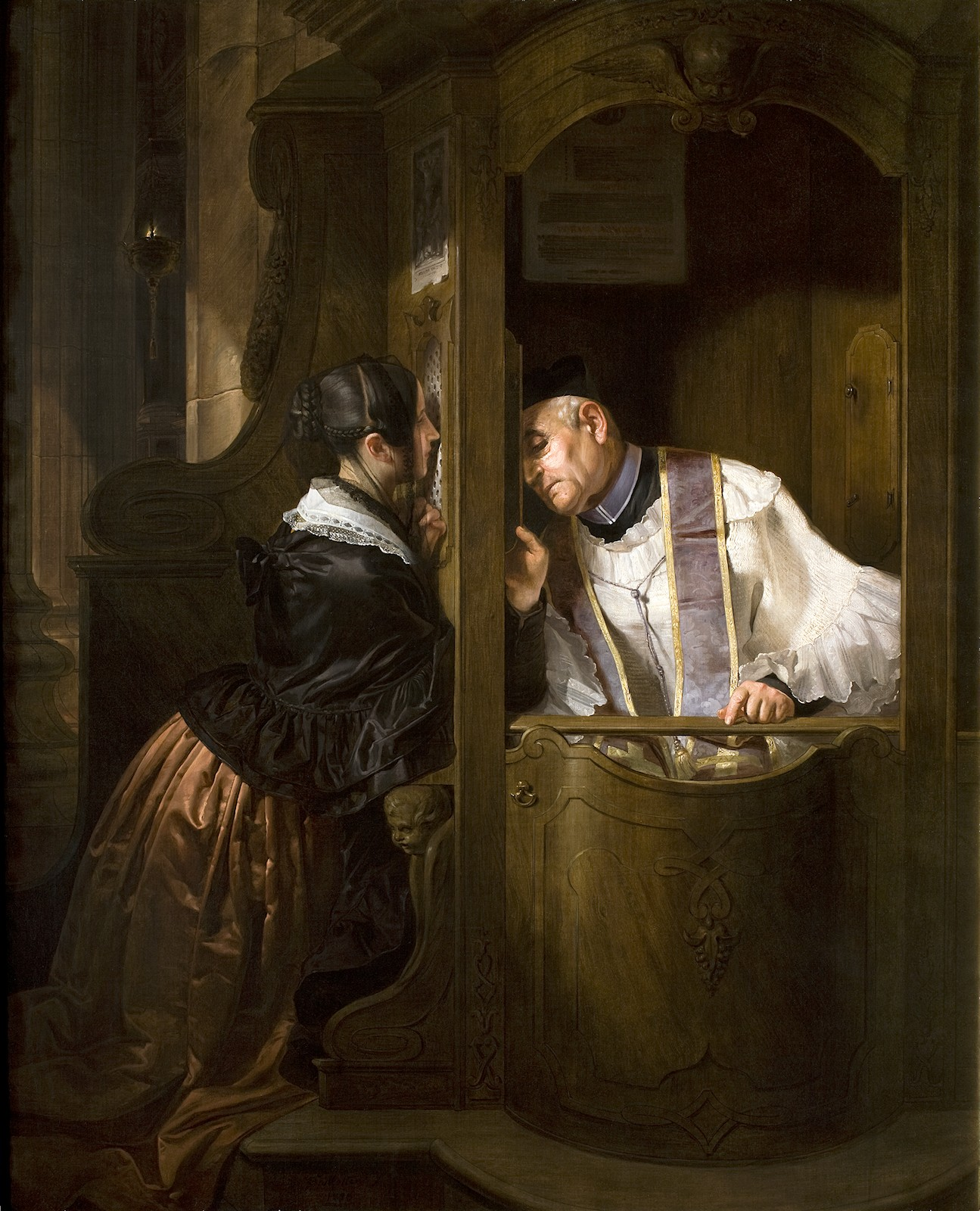
- Artist: Giuseppe Molteni
- Year: 1838
- Type: Oil on canvas, genre painting
- Dimensions: 173.5 cm × 141 cm (68.3 in × 56 in)
- Location: Gallerie d'Italia; Milan

The Confession (Italian: La Confessione) is an 1838 oil painting by the Italian artist Giuseppe Molteni. It depicts a young woman attending the Confessional for Confession. Its composition likely drew inspiration from Giuseppe Crespi's 1712 painting Confession.

Molteni was a close friend of Francesco Hayez and a prominent figure of Italian Romanticism. The picture was displayed at the 1838 annual exhibition at the Pinacoteca di Brera in Milan The painting was originally acquired by the Austrian Emperor Ferdinand I for the Belvedere Palace in Vienna. It was later sold by the Hapsburg Family in 1928. In 1998 it was acquired by the Cariplo Collection and is now at the Gallerie d'Italia in Milan.
